= Estuaries of Paravur =

Group of Estuaries in Paravur, Kollam

The Paravur Estuaries are a group of estuaries in Paravur, India, near the South-Western coast of Kollam district, Kerala. Paravur is one among the 4 municipal towns in Kollam district, Kerala state. The place is known for its natural beauties, backwater locations, white-sand beaches and concentration of temples.

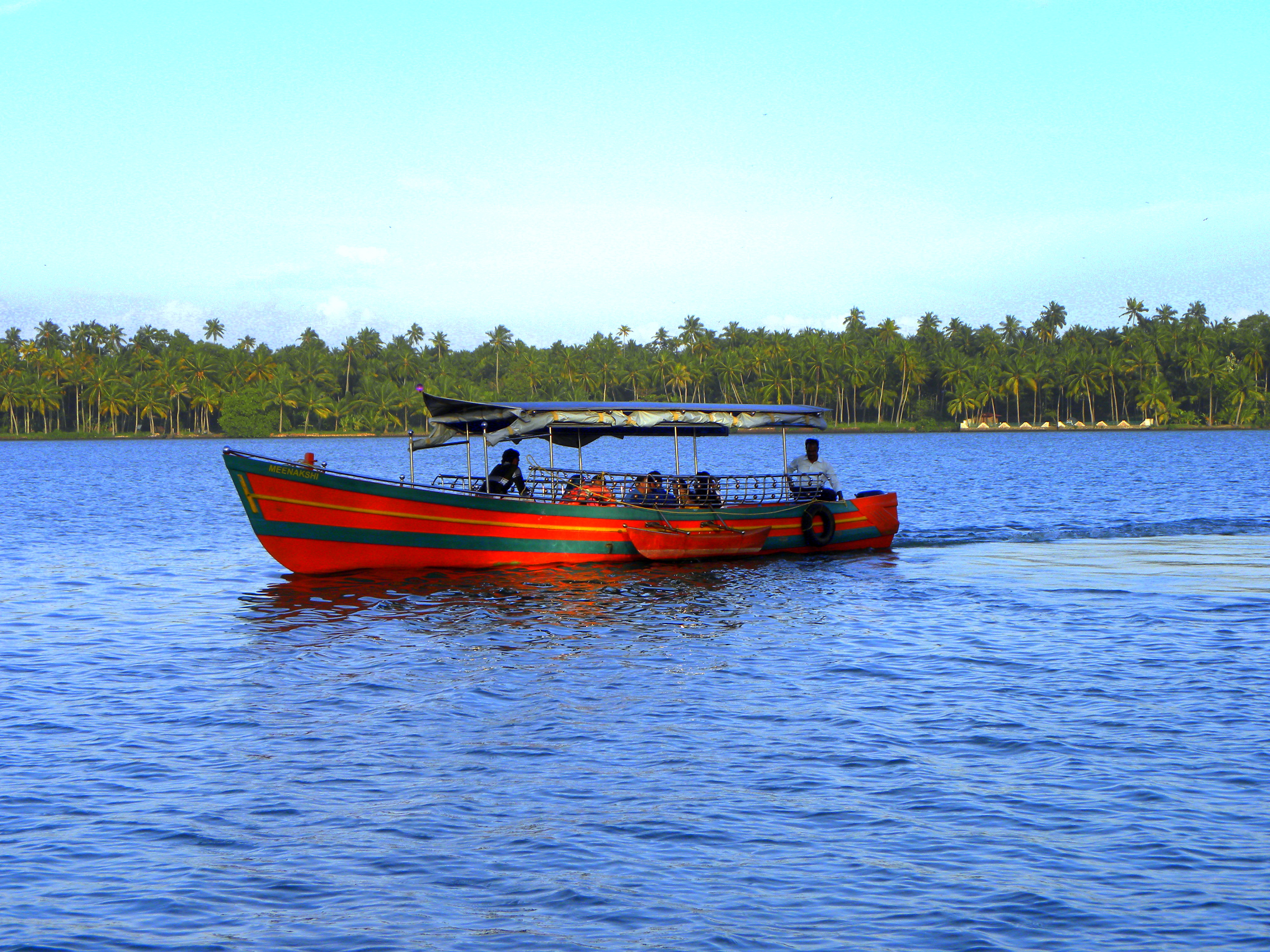
Boating at Paravur Lake

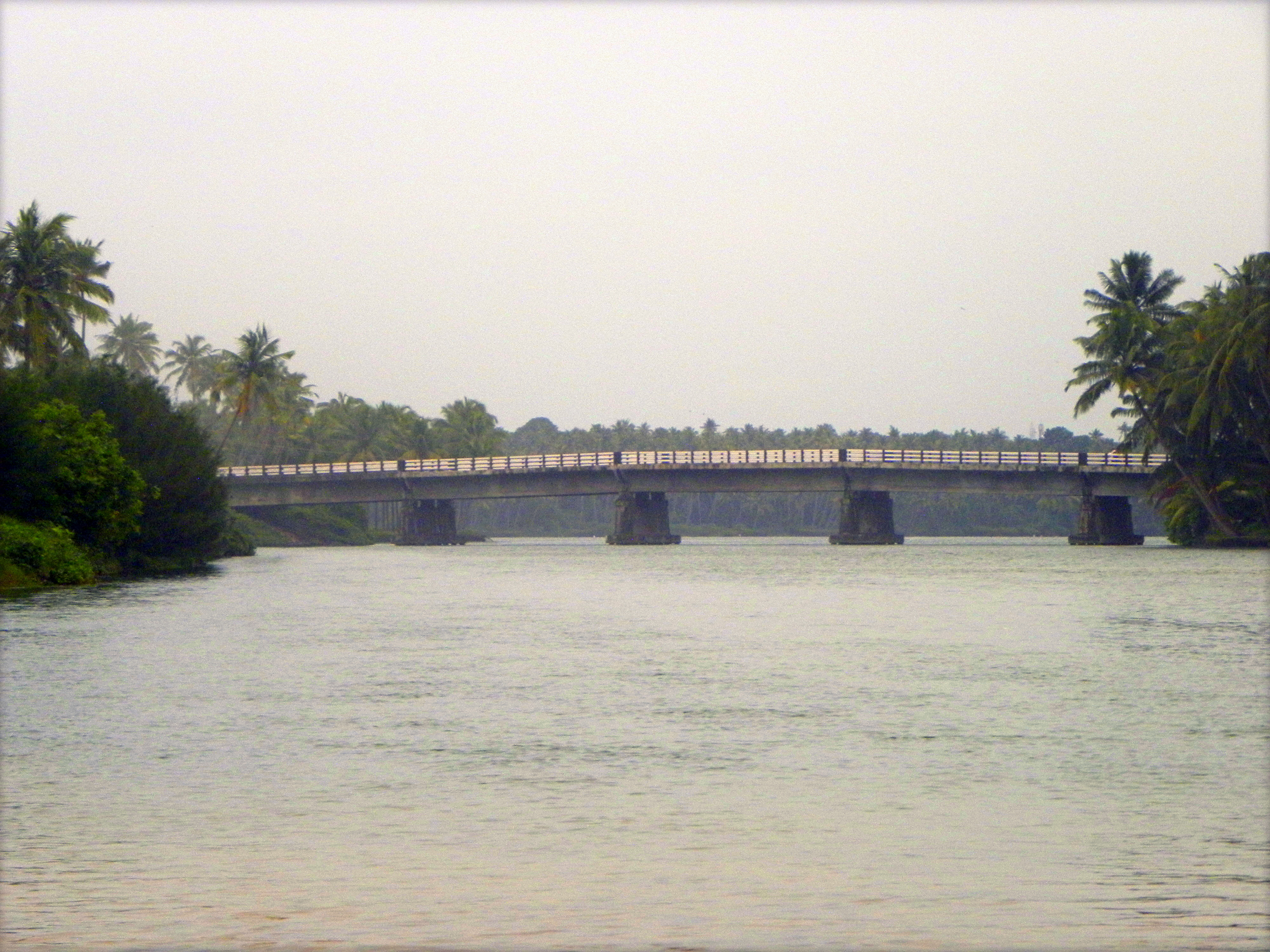
Thekkumbhagam-Kappil bridge as seen from Paravur Estuary. This bridge is the official border of Paravur town towards south

== Geography ==
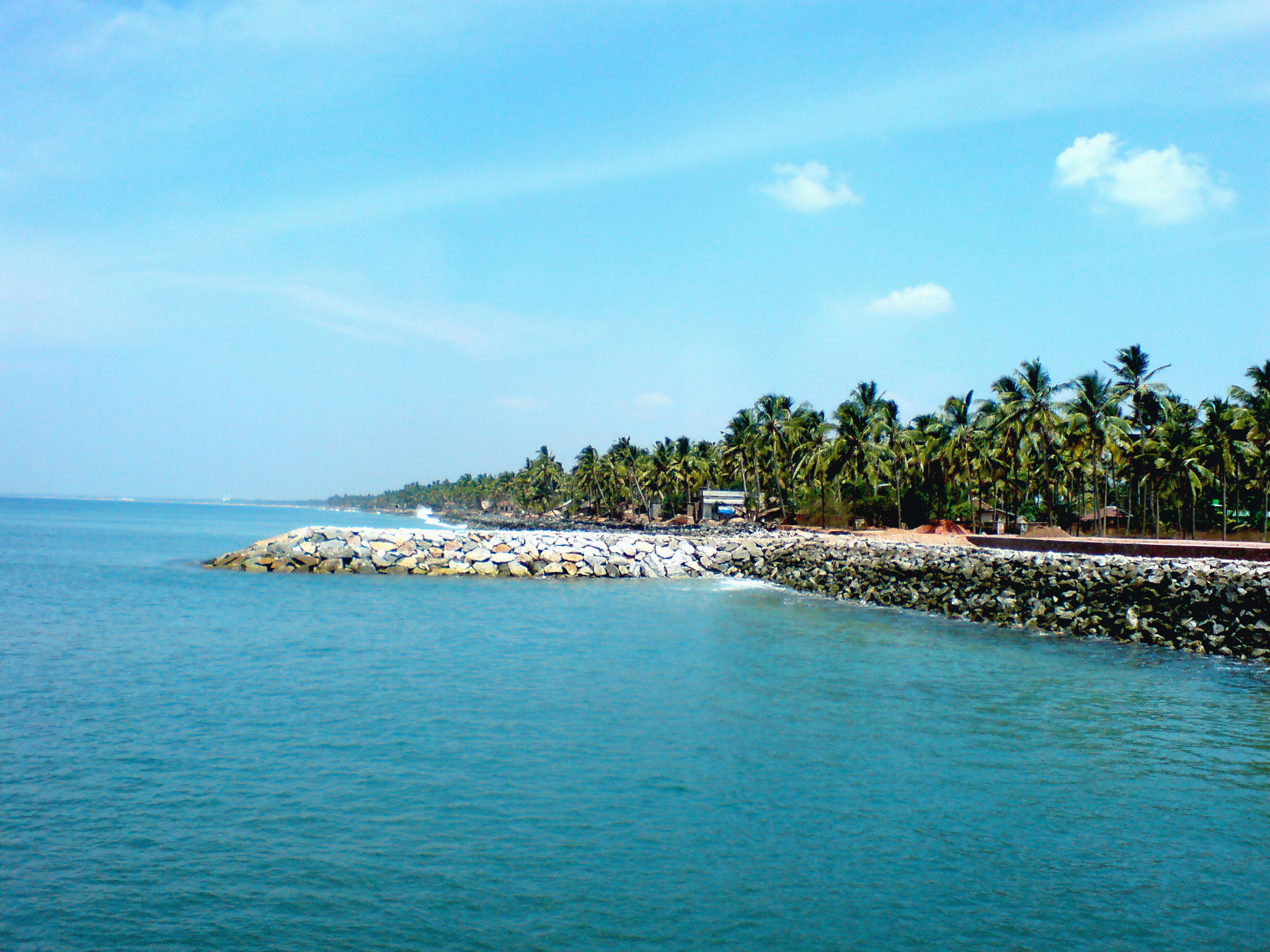
Pozhikkara peninsula in the north of Paravur town

Paravur is a land of beaches, backwaters & estuaries. The Paravur landmass's three sides are surrounded by water bodies - Paravur Lake, Nadayara Lake and the Arabian Sea. Paravur Lake is the main body of water in the town area, having a catchment area of 6.62 km^{2}. The peninsula of Paravur is one of the most visited areas in Kollam district. Both north and south tips of Paravur town have peninsulas and estuaries. Pozhikara is to the north and Thekkumbhagam is to the south of Paravur. One more estuary mouth is in Pozhikara, which is very close to Pozhikara Devi Temple, which has breached in 2014 under the supervision of Water Resources Department (WRD), after a long gap of 14 years.

The estuaries can be reached by travelling through Kollam-Paravur Coastal Road and Paravur-Kappil-Varkala road. The 600 hectare Polachira Wetland is also close to Paravur.

== Pozhi ==
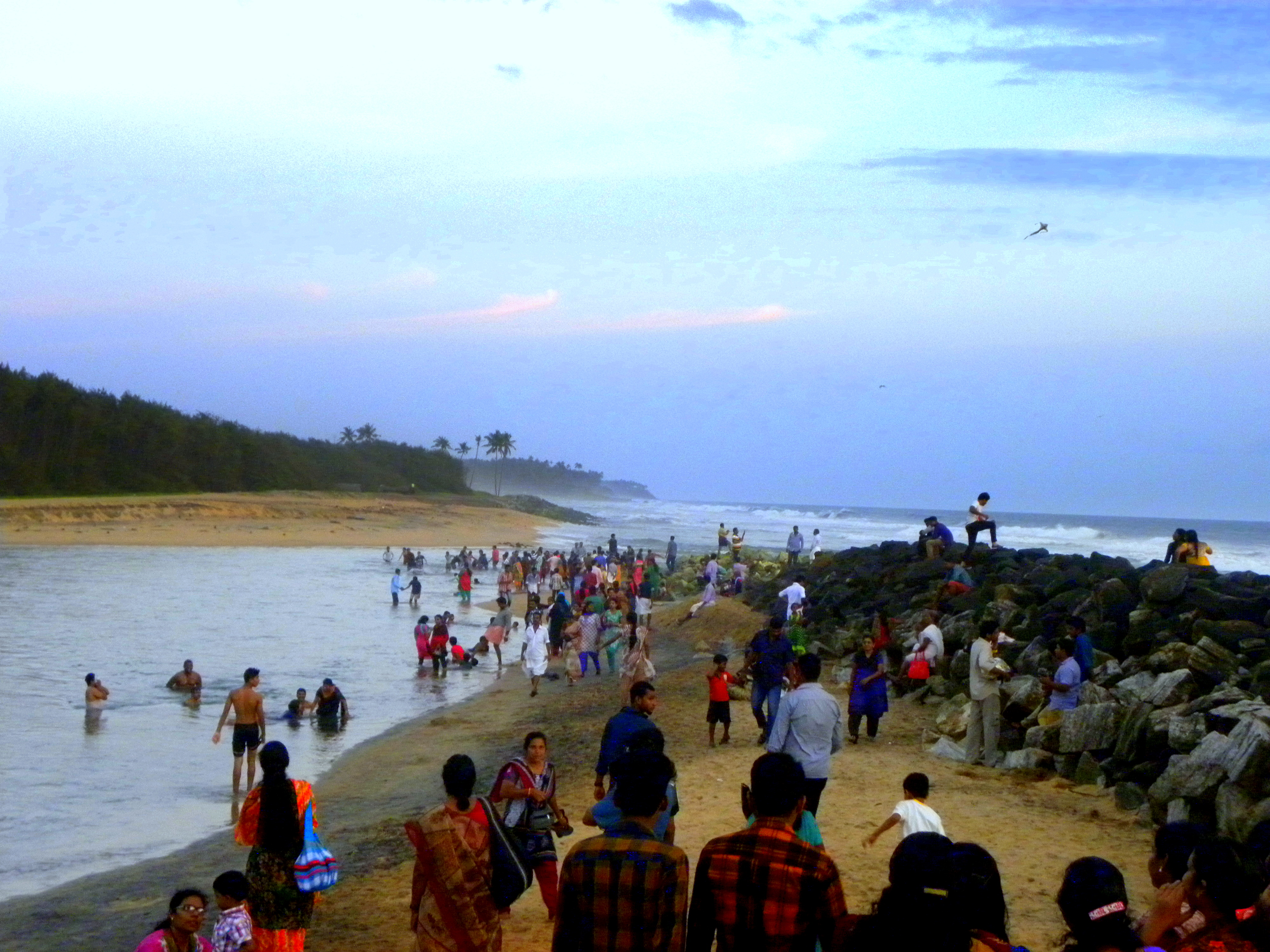
Paravur Estuary mouth at Thekkumbhagam

Pozhi is a natural phenomena of formation of a sand bar along the coast separating sea and backwaters in the peninsula areas during summer season but which erode during the monsoon season, allowing the sea to be merged with the backwaters. Paravur backwaters' on both the north (Thanni beach) and south ends (Thekkumbhagam beach) have Pozhi. Both meet the Arabian Sea in the district's beach faces. There is an artificial tidal-regulator in the spillway bridge at Pozhikara estuarine area, constructed in 1957 to control the salt water intrusion into Paravur Lake. This phenomenon provides abundant water for people living in the Grama panchayats of Ithikkara, Velinalloor, Pooyappally, Adichanalloor, parts of Poothakkulam, Polachira, Mayyanad, Chirakkara, Chathannoor, Elakamon, Edava and the Paravur municipal area.

== Paravur Lake ==
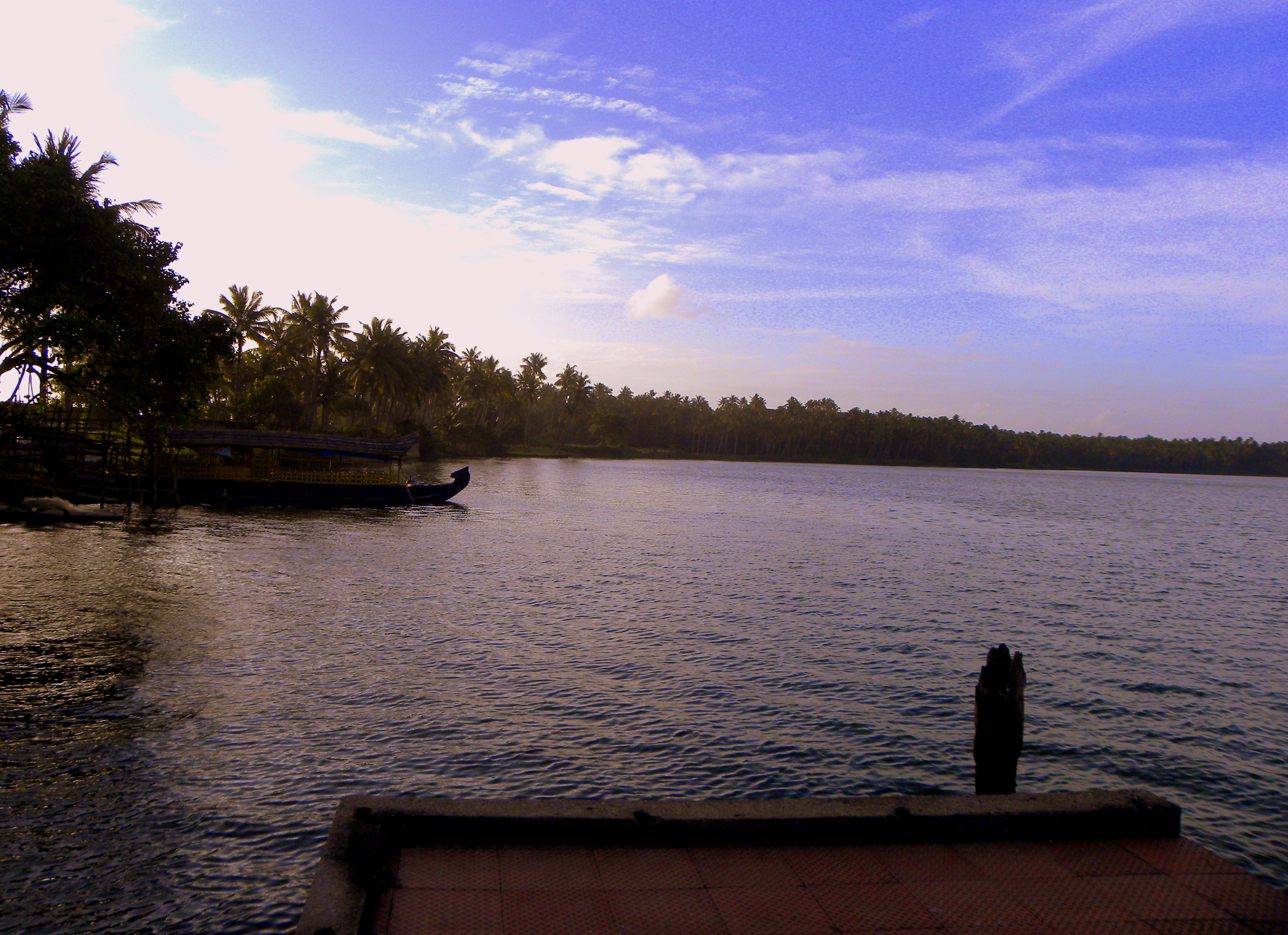
An evening view of Paravur Lake

Paravur Lake is a lake in Paravur, Kerala, India. Although it is small, with an area of only 6.62 km^{2}, it is the end point of the Ithikkara River and part of the system of lakes and canals that make up the Kerala Backwaters. It has been connected to Edava and Ashtamudi Kayal as part of the Trivandrum - Shoranur canal system since the late 19th century.
