= Kottappuram, Paravur =

Kottappuram Kottapuram
- Neighbourhood & Urban Village
- Location in Kerala, India Kottappuram (India)
- Coordinates: 8.806022°N 76.670004°E
- Country: India
- State: Kerala
- District: Kollam
- Municipality: Paravur

Population (2011)
  - Total: 5,817

Languages
  - Official: Malayalam, English
- Time zone: UTC+5:30 (IST)
- PIN: 691301
- Telephone code: 0474
- Vehicle registration: KL-02
- Nearest city: Kollam (21 km)
- Climate: Tropical monsoon (Köppen)
- Avg. summer temperature: 35 °C (95 °F)
- Avg. winter temperature: 20 °C (68 °F)

Kottappuram or Kottapuram is an urban village, situated at Paravur municipality in Kollam district, Kerala. It is one among the two villages in Paravur municipality and one among the 30 villages coming under Kollam Taluk.

Kottapuram is situated in between Paravur town and Paravur Thekkumbhagam. It is on the way towards Varkala.

== Location ==
- Paravur railway station - 400 m
- Paravur Thekkumbhagam - 1 km
- Pozhikara - 2.5 km
- Nedungolam - 3.5 km
- Kollam - 22.6 km
