= Puthenkulam =

Village in Kerala, India

Puthenkulam Puthankulam
- Village
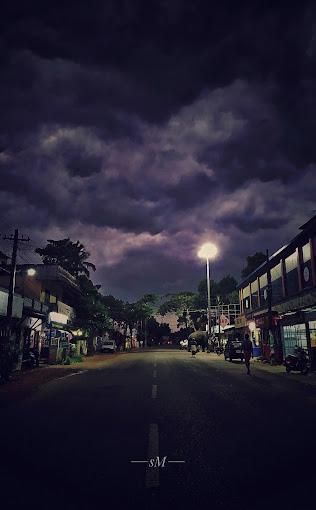
- Puthenkulam Junction night view

- Location in Kerala, India
- Coordinates: 8.8113566°N 76.7184985°E
- Country: India
- State: Kerala
- District: Kollam
- Taluk: Ithikkara
- Grama Panchayat: Poothakkulam

Puthenkulam is a small village in Ithikkara block in Kollam district of Kerala state, India. It comes under Poothakkulam Grama panchayath. Puthenkulam postal pincode is 691302. It is located 5 km from Paravur on Paravur - Parippally road. Puthenkulam is known as the 'elephant village' and is a popular tourist spot in Kollam.Puthenkulam is known for its captive elephants and attracts visitors interested in seeing them. One of the well-known elephants in the village is "Puthenkulam Modi", named by its owner after Prime Minister Narendra Modi and brought to Kerala from Jharkhand in 2016. Approximate driving distance between Kollam railway station to Puthenkulam bus stop is about 22.1 km.

== Transportation ==
Nearest airport is Trivandrum International Airport which is 48 km away . Paravur railway station is about 5 km away and Varkala railway station is about 11 km away.

== Tourist places ==
- Kaveri Elephant Park (Anathavalam) Puthenkulam is one of the few ethical tourist oriented place that focus on interaction with elephants.
- Varkala Sivagiri, Varkala Cliff, Varkala beach are about 11 km away from Puthenkulam.
- Kappil beach and Pozhikkara are about 5 km away from Puthenkulam.
- Edava beach is about 13 km away from Puthenkulam.
- Polachira hardly 3 km from puthenkulam.
- Ravananpoyka

== Nearby educational institutions ==
- D.V.L.P.S Puthenkulam, (Devaraja Vilasom L.P School)
- Govt Higher Secondary School, Bhoothakkulam
- Chempakassey Higher Secondary School, Bhoothakkulam
- GHS Chirakkara
- UKF College of Engineering and Technology Mylavila
- Government Medical College, Kollam Parippally

== Nearby hospitals ==
- JJ Hospital Puthenkulam
- Santhosh Hospital Puthenkulam
- Government Medical College, Kollam Parippally
- Rama Rao Memorial Taluk Hospital Nedungolam
- Sadhveda Ayurvedic Hospital Puthenkulam

== Infrastructure and Amenities ==
Puthenkulam includes hospitality facilities such as the four-star Kaveri International Hotel and recreational infrastructure like the Izyan Sports City & Convention Centre. Cinema theatres including Ashok Cine House (Paravur) and Revathy CineMax (Parippally) are located within a 5–6 km radius.

== Administration ==
2025 Local Body Election - Kerala Source Source
Ward No	Ward name	Member	Party	Alliance
4	Village Office	V K Sunilkumar	BJP	NDA
5	Puthenkulam	Laila Joy	CPI(M)	LDF
6	Ezhamvila	Chippi Chandran	BJP	NDA

=== 2020 Ward members ===
2020 Local Body Election - Kerala Source Source
Ward No	Ward name	Member	Party	Alliance
4	Puthenkulam	Remya S	CPI	LDF
5	Ooninmoodu	Laila Joy	CPI(M)	LDF
6	Ezhamvila	Shaiju Balachandran	INC	UDF

=== Previous Ward members ===
Year	Ward NO	Ward Name	Member	Party
2015	4	Puthenkulam	V K Sunilkumar	UDF
2015	5	Ooninmoodu	V Joy	LDF
2015	6	Ezhamvila	Chithralekha C	LDF
2010	4	Puthenkulam	Lissy Suresh	UDF
2010	5	Ooninmoodu	Neethu Baiju	UDF
2010	6	Ezhamvila	V K Sunilkumar	UDF
2005	4	Puthenkulam	V K Sunilkumar	UDF
2005	5	Thalakulam	Remani Das	LDF

=== Libraries and clubs ===
Name	Established Year	Place
Navodaya Arts & Sports Club and Library	1959	Pannavila nallumukk Puthenkulam
Vivekodayam Arts & Sports Club and Library	1963	Kaling Junction Puthenkulam
Chanakya Cultural Society	1994	Puthenkulam
Navaneethi Arts & Sports Club	2016	Puthenkulam

== Gallery ==
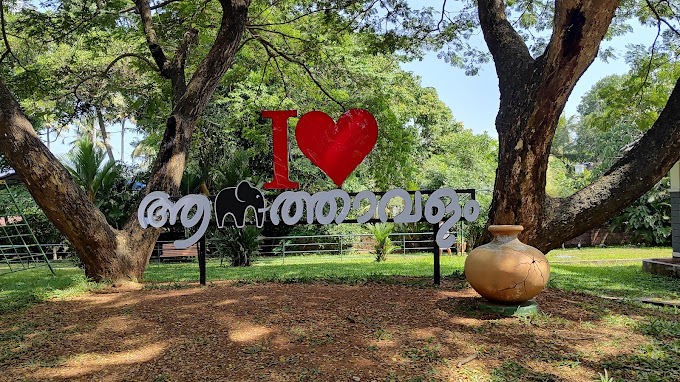
Aanathavalam Puthenkulam

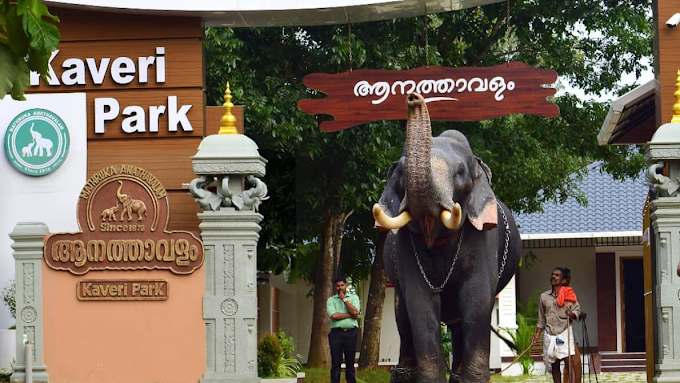
Kaveri Elephant Park Puthenkulam

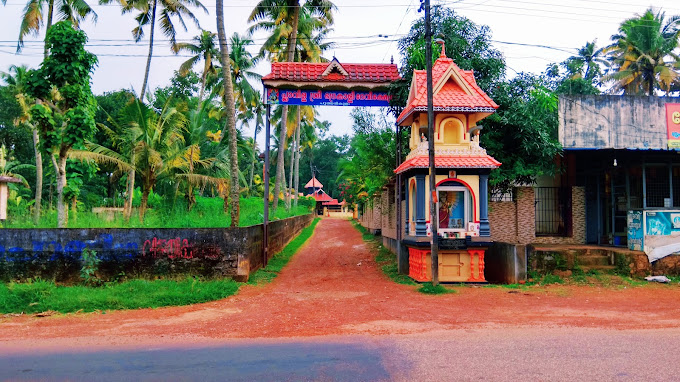
Plavila Devi Temple Puthenkulam

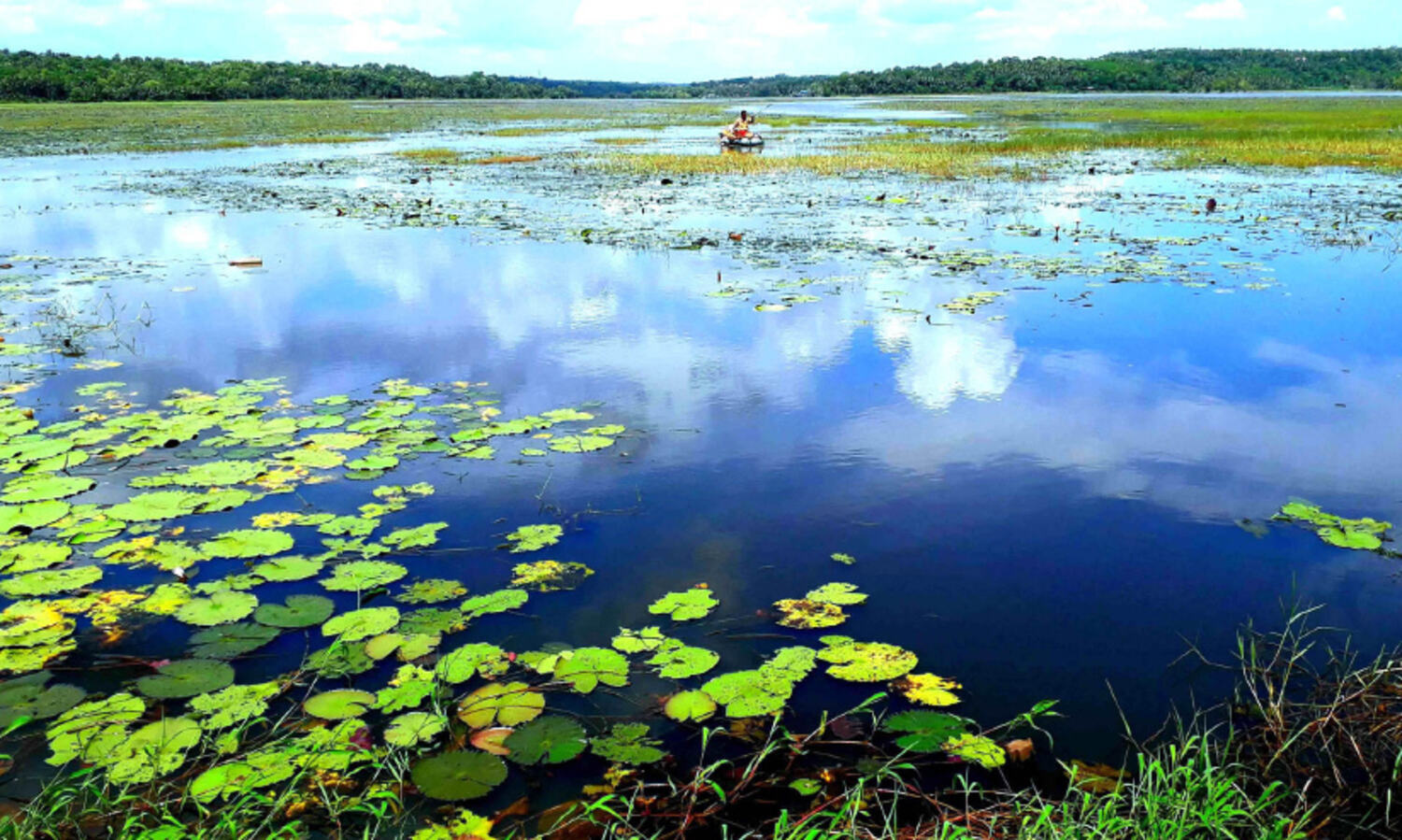
Polachira
