= Ithikkara (disambiguation) =

Ithikkara is a village in India.

Ithikkara may also refer to:

- Ithikkara Pakki, Indian outlaw
- Ithikkara River, river in India
