= Kottapuram High School =

Boys' high school in Paravur, Kerala

Kottapuram High School, Paravoor
- കോട്ടപ്പുറം ഹൈസ്കൂൾ, പരവൂർ
- Paravur, Kollam district, Kerala, India; India

Information
- Type: Private aided boys' high school
- Established: 1907
- Authority: Department of General Education, Government of Kerala
- Grades: 5–10
- Gender: Boys
- Language: Malayalam

Kottapuram High School, Paravoor (commonly known as KHS Paravoor) is a private aided boys' high school located in Paravur town, Kollam district, Kerala, India. The school was established in 1907 and provides education from grade 5 to grade 10 with Malayalam as the language of instruction.

== History ==
Kottapuram High School was founded in 1907 to serve the educational needs of boys in Paravur and the surrounding region. Since its establishment, the school has operated as a private aided institution under the oversight of the Kerala Department of General Education.

== Academics ==
The school follows the curriculum prescribed by the Kerala state education board and prepares students for the Secondary School Leaving Certificate (SSLC) examination conducted by the Government of Kerala.

== Administration ==
Kottapuram High School is managed as a private aided high school under the supervision of the Department of General Education, Government of Kerala.
