= Sujanandini =

Early Malayalam newspaper from Paravur

Sujanandini (Malayalam: സുജാനന്ദിനി) was an early Malayalam-language newspaper published from Paravur (present-day Kollam district), Kerala, India. It began publication in 1891 and was managed by Paravoor V. Kesavanasan (Kesavan Asan), a social reformer and early journalist. The newspaper is noted in the history of early Malayalam journalism and print culture in Kerala.

== History ==
Sujanandini is mentioned in studies of Malayalam print media as one of the early newspapers published from the Paravur–Quilon region during the late 19th century, a period when Malayalam journalism was in its formative stage.

== Legacy ==
Sujanandini is considered part of the early phase of Malayalam journalism and is cited in historical works dealing with the development of newspapers in Kerala.
