= Paravur Lake =

Lake in Kerala, India

- പരവൂർ കായൽ (Malayalam)
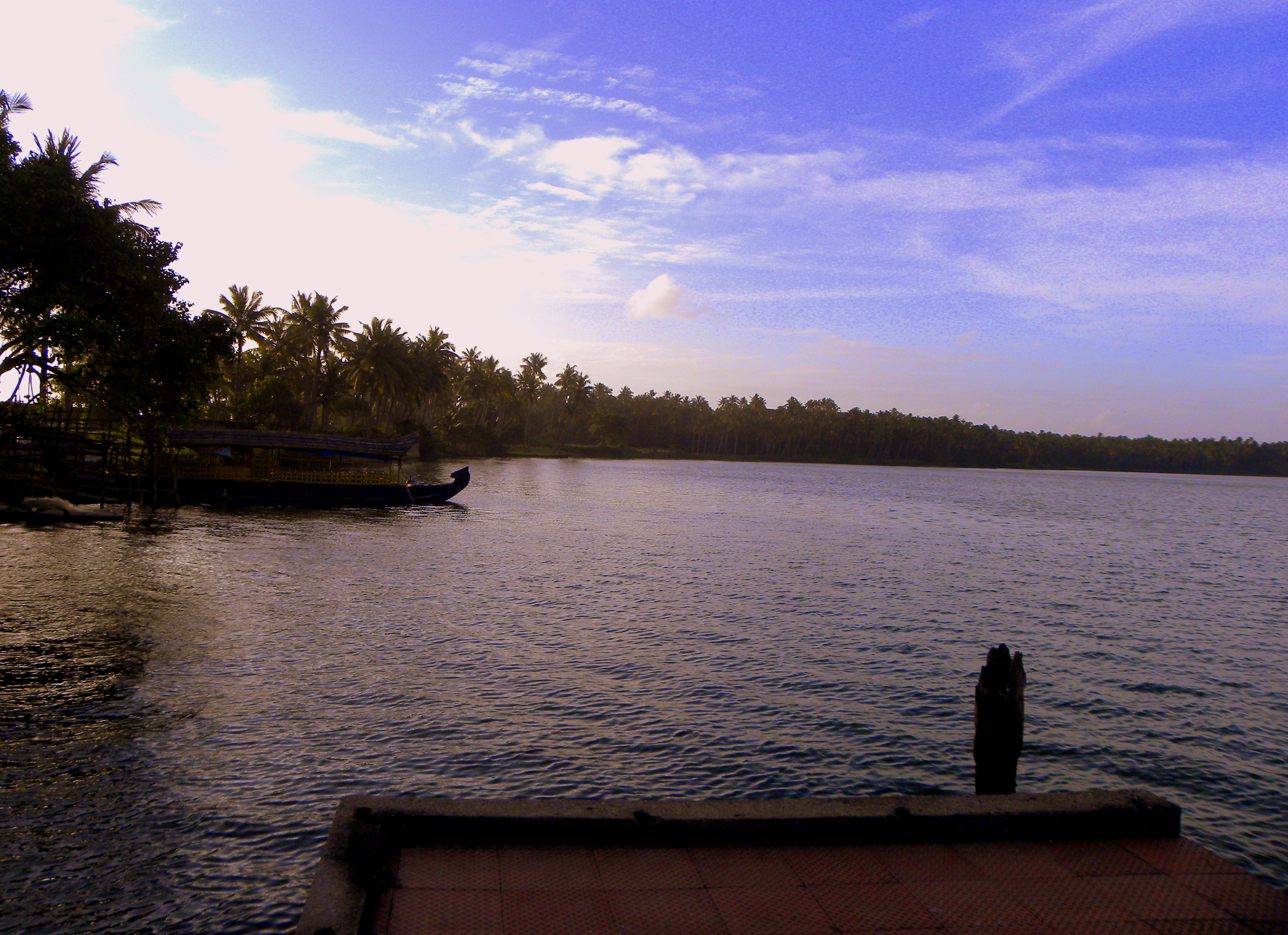
- An evening view of Paravur Lake

- Location within Kerala
- Location: Paravur, Kollam, Kerala
- Coordinates: 8.822°N 76.659°E
- Primary inflows: Ithikkara River
- Catchment area: 6.6246 km^{2} (2.56 sq mi)
- Basin countries: India
- Surface area: 6.62 km^{2} (2.56 sq mi)

Paravur Kayal is a lake in Paravur, a municipality in the Kollam district of Kerala, India. Although it is small with an area of only 6.62 km^{2}, it is the end point of the Ithikkara River and part of the system of lakes and canals that make up the Kerala backwaters. It has been connected to Edava and Ashtamudi Kayal as part of the Trivandrum - Shoranur canal system since the late 19th century.

== Importance of Paravur Lake ==
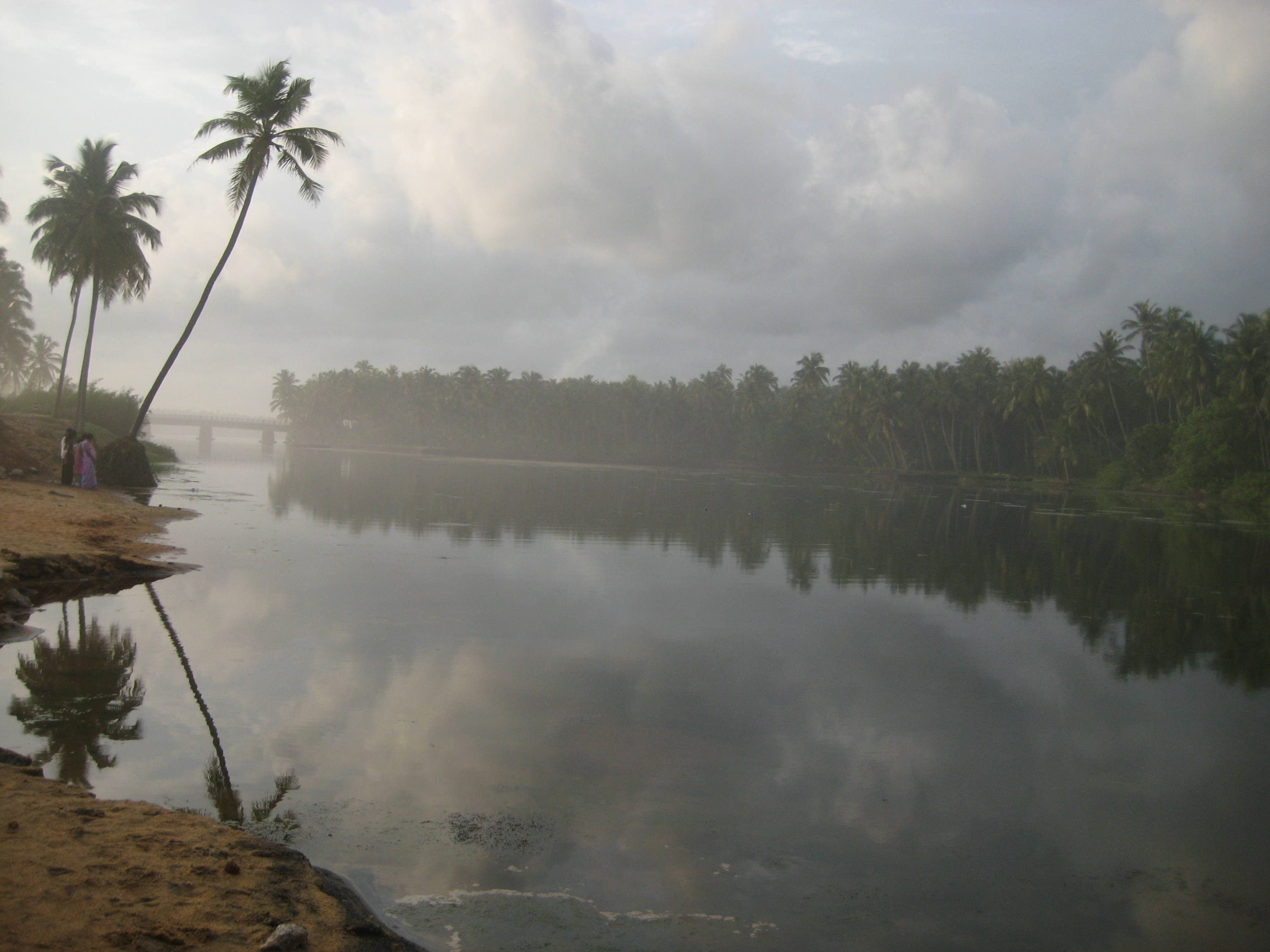
Paravur Lake near Thekkumbhagam estuary

The lake meets the sea and in between a small stretch of road which divides them can be viewed on way. Paravur Lake is one of the emerging tourist destinations in the district which attracts a good number of tourists.

The Paravur Lake area has mangrove forests, including areas of mangrove growth on railway land.

== See also ==
- Paravur
- Paravur Thekkumbhagam
- Paravur railway station
- Pozhikara
- Nedungolam
