= Nedungolam =

Nedungolam Nedumgolam
- Neighbourhood
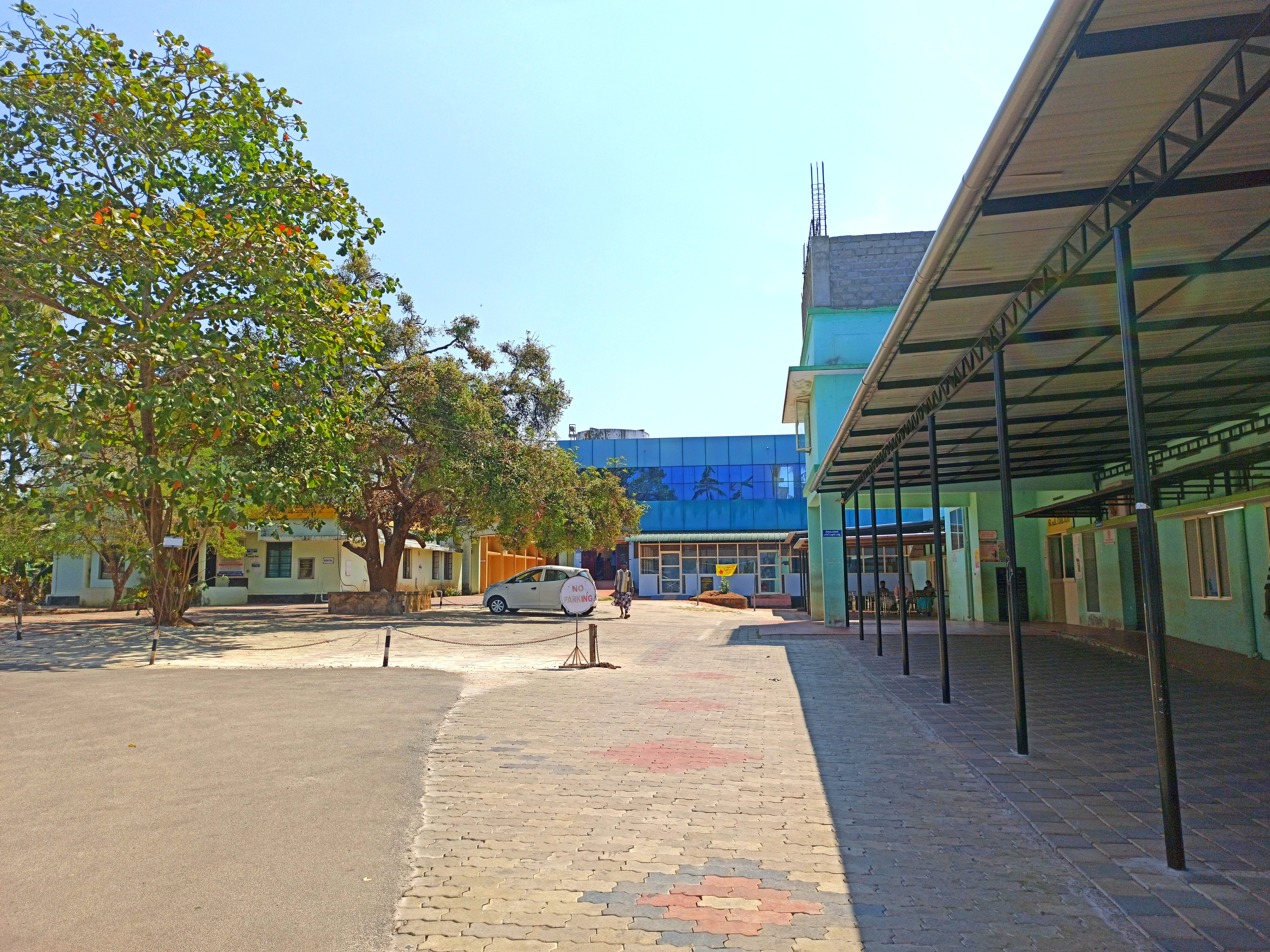
- Govt. Taluk Hospital in Nedungolam, Paravur

- Location in Kerala, India
- Coordinates: 8°50′2″N 76°40′56″E
- Country: India
- State: Kerala
- District: Kollam

Government
  - Type: Municipal council
  - Body: Paravur Municipality

Languages
  - Official: Malayalam, English
- Time zone: UTC+5:30 (IST)
- PIN: 691334
- Telephone code: 0474
- Vehicle registration: KL-02
- Nearest city: Kollam - 18 km
- Nearest town: Paravur - 3 km
- Website: www.paravuronline.com www.paravurmunicipality.in//

Nedungolam or Nedumgolam is a suburb of Paravur municipality in the Kollam district of Kerala state, India. It is near to the wetland Polachira, which is a destination for migratory birds. A census conducted on 2003 reveals that over 26,000 birds belonging to 37 species are visiting or living in the Polachira wetlands.

== Importance of Nedungolam ==
Nedungolam is a town with two major junctions - Hospital Junction and Post Office Junction. It is one of the important attractions of blessed estuary land, Paravur. Most of the resorts in Paravur are very near to Nedungolam. Beautiful beaches of Paravur are just 5 km away from Nedungolam. Proximity to the world-famous Kerala wetland, Polachira is another blessing of Nedungolam. In addition to that, one of the heritage sites of Kerala, Pozhikkara is just 5 km from Nedungolam. Rama Rao Memorial Govt. Taluk Hospital, Paravur - The one and only Taluk Hospital in Chathannoor constituency is in Nedungolam. Paravur Sub-Registrar Office, Padmanabha Rao public library, B.R Hospital - another famous hospital in Paravur etc. - are the other important institutions in Nedungolam. Many Hindu temples, Nedungolam Service Co-operative Bank, Nedungolam Post-office and Nedungolam Govt. Higher Secondary School are also situated in the locality of Nedungolam. Resorts in Nedungolam area include:

- Aquasserenne Resort, Paravur
- Fragrant Nature Hotels & Resorts Pvt Ltd., Paravur
- The Tranquil Palms Resort, Paravur

== How to reach ==
Nedungolam is located at the borders of Paravur Municipality and is in Paravur-Chathannoor road. Nedungolam is well connected with almost all the major towns. It is about 18 km from Kollam City and 3 km from Paravur town. Private and KSRTC bus services connect Nedungolam with various towns in Kerala. Paravur Municipal Bus Stand is 4 km away from Nedungolam.

Paravur Railway Station is the nearest important railway station to Nedungolam, which is 3 km from Nedungolam. 14 pairs of trains connect Paravur with various Indian cities like Kollam, Trivandrum, Kochi, Calicut, Palakkad, Thrissur, Bengaluru, Chennai, Mumbai, Madurai, Kanyakumari, Mangalore, Pune, Salem, Coimbatore, Trichy and Tirunelveli through Indian Railways.

There are no airports in Kollam district. The nearest airport is Trivandrum International Airport, about 57 kilometres (35 mi) away. Daily domestic flight services are available to major cities like Mumbai, Chennai, Delhi, Bangalore and Kochi. International flight services connecting to Sharjah, Dubai, Abu Dhabi, Bahrain, Kuwait, Muscat, Male, Doha, Singapore and Colombo are available from here.

== See also ==
- Paravur
- Paravur Railway Station
- Pozhikkara
- Thekkumbhagam
- Kollam
- Paravur Kayal
- Kollam District
