= Paravur, Kollam =

Royal Paravur Paravoor
- Municipal Town
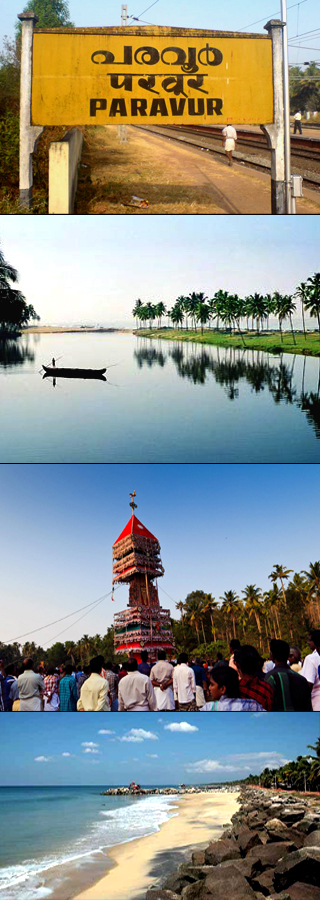
- From top: Paravur railway station, Paravur Lake(Kaayal), Aayiravilli Temple Festival, Pulimuttu in Paravur Pozhikara

- Location in Kerala, India
- Coordinates: 8.811°N 76.669°E
- Country: India
- State: Kerala
- District: Kollam
- Native Language: Malayalam
- Established: 1932

Government
  - Type: Municipal Council
  - Body: Paravur Municipality
  - Municipal Chairman: Jayalal Unnithan

Area
  - Total: 16.19 km^{2} (6.25 sq mi)

Population (2011)
  - Total: 37,245
  - Density: 2,300/km^{2} (5,958/sq mi)
- Demonym(s): Paravurian, Paravurkkaran

Languages
  - Official: Malayalam, English
- Time zone: UTC+5:30 (IST)
- PIN: 691 301
- Telephone code: 0474
- Vehicle registration: KL-02
- Nearest city: Kollam (22 kilometres (14 mi))
- Assembly Constituency: Chathannoor
- Lok Sabha Constituency: Kollam
- Taluk: Kollam
- Website: www.paravurmunicipality.in

Paravur (Malayalam pronunciation: [pɐɾɐʋuːr]) is a municipality in the Kollam district of Kerala, India. It is located 11.6 km (7.2 mi) southeast of Kollam city center and is a part of the Kollam metropolitan area. Paravur railway station is the last station in Kollam district, which is on the route to Trivandrum while traveling towards South India.

== Governance and Wards ==
Paravur Municipality consists of Kottapuram, Koonayil, Thekkumbhagam, Chillakkal, Perumpuzha, Nedungolam, Pozhikara, Maniyamkulam, Kurumandal, Kottamoola, Attinpuram and Kochalummoodu. Paravur Municipality is a Grade-II Municipality of Kerala.

== Administration ==
2025 Local Body Election – Paravoor Municipality
Ward No	Ward name	Councillor	Party	Alliance
1	Perumpuzha	Sumam S	CPI(M)	LDF
2	Vinayakar	Sumi S	CPI(M)	LDF
3	Nedumgolam	Ramyanath S R	CPI(M)	LDF
4	Parayilkavu	Soorya Sunil	CPI(M)	LDF
5	Kochalummoodu	J Jayalal Unnithan	CPI(M)	LDF
6	Pashuman	Saritha	CPI(M)	LDF
7	Ayiravalli	Sindhu	CPI(M)	LDF
8	Peral	Archana B	CPI(M)	LDF
9	Ollal	Rajeev V S	BJP	NDA
10	Krishibhavan	Ajimol J	BJP	NDA
11	Market	Priji R Shaji	INC	UDF
12	Town	Swarnamma Suresh	BJP	NDA
13	Attinpuram	V Prakash	INC	UDF
14	Puthiyidam	Sashikala P S	CPI(M)	LDF
15	Kottamoola	Satheesh Kumar R	CPI(M)	LDF
16	Nerukadavu	Soumya L	CPI(M)	LDF
17	Thekkumbhagam	Rejila A	CPI(M)	LDF
18	Puthiyakavu	Amina H	CPI(M)	LDF
19	Vadakkumbhagam	Sujatha S	CPI(M)	LDF
20	Kurandikulam	Paravoor Sajeeb	INC	UDF
21	Chillaikkal	Khadeeja Beevi	INC	UDF
22	Pozikkara	Vishnu V S	BJP	NDA
23	Anchal Office	Sirajudheen	CPI(M)	LDF
24	Maniyamkulam	Sheela S	BJP	NDA
25	Kurumandal	Pradeep G	BJP	NDA
26	Puttingal	G Gayathri	CPI(M)	LDF
27	Railway Station	Sujatha B	CPI(M)	LDF
28	Punjirakkulam	Sudheer Chellappan	Independent	OTH
29	Kallumkunnu	Ashok Kumar R K	CPI(M)	LDF
30	Mangakunnu	Geetha S	INC	UDF
31	Pukkulam	Girija Pradeep	CPI(M)	LDF
32	Yakshikkavu	Ranjith B C	CPI(M)	LDF

== Geography ==
Paravur is located at 8.78 N 76 E. It has an average elevation of 10 metres (32 feet). Paravur, 21 kilometers from the Kollam, is a narrow skirt of land stretching in between the backwaters and the sea. There is an elevation of 6 metres above sea level, extending to 16 metres on the inland. Ithikkara river is flowing through paravur. Nedungolam in paravur is now famous for mangrove forest.

== Demographics ==
As of 2011 India census, Paravur had a population of 37,245 where 16,874 are males and 20,371 are females thus the average sex ratio of Paravoor is 1,207. Paravur has an average literacy rate of 92.5%, higher than the national average of 59.5%: male literacy is 94.7%, and female literacy is 90.7%. In Paravur, 10% of the population are under 6 years of age. Total number of households are 9,074.

== History ==
The word Paravur is considered to be a derivative of the primitive Dravidian Etymology – ‘Paravii’ which means sea and ‘Oor’ which means place. It was originally named Paravayoor which was subsequently modified to Paravur. Pozhikara was the administrative headquarters of Paravur. Remnants of the old fort, Thaana (police station) and Anchalappees (post office) still remain. A mint of the erstwhile Travancore Kingdom for printing and punching their currencies was once situated at Paravur. Paravur was a part of 'Pennarasu nadu' which laid between Venadu and Desiganadu. It was then under the control of 'Attingal amma thampuran'. An important ancient document revealing paravur's yester importance is 'Pozhikkara sasanam' built in 12 th century at Pozhikkara sivakshetram (later it became a devikshetram). It was encrypted on a 'sila phalakam' in 'vattazhuthu'. Another mentioning of Paravur is in 'Unnineeli sandesam' which was written above more than 600 years. Some of the temples in Paravur are mentioned with importance in that script. Also, some manuscripts held on Sree Padmanabha Swami Kshethram has mensioning of some incidence held in Paravur-Thekkumbhagom. Paravur panchayat was formed in 1936 as one of the four panchayats sanctioned by Sir C.P.Ramaswamy Iyer (Diwan-Travancore). Sree Ramavarma koyi thampuram from Kilimanoor Palace was the first executive officer of the panchayat. The first election for Paravur panchayat was held at 1942 and Sri Achuthan Pillai became the first elected Panchayat president. Later Paravur became a Municipality on 1 May 1988. For the first 7 years it was ruled by special officers. In 1995 after the first Municipal election Smt. Bhanumati became the first Municipal Chairperson .First Industrial establishment for the coir industry was opened at Maniyamkulam. The first government school which started during 1889 and is still their in Kongal. In 19th century itself paravur were in the publication industry. Sarawathy vilasam Achadi sala is considered to be the first one in that type and Mangattu Parameswaran Pillai was its founder. Kerala Bhooshanam and Vidyavilasam Press were also started in 19th century. 'Sujanandini' was the first newspaper printed and published from Paravur(1891). Paravoor V. Kesavanasan was the managing director of it. The initial poems of Kuamaranasan were published in this paper for first time.

== Transport ==
=== Road ===
There are so many important roads in Paravur, connecting Kollam city and neighbouring towns like Chathannoor, Parippally, Varkala, Poothakkulam etc. The 14.1 km long Paravur-Kollam Coastal Road is connecting Kollam city with Paravur, via Kollam Beach, Paapanasam Beach, Kakkathoppu, Mukkom, Thanni and Pozhikara.

=== Rail ===
Paravur railway station, an "Adarsh station", is situated at a distance of half kilometer away from the heart of Paravur town. Paravur is connected to various cities in India through Indian Railways. The station code for Paravur railway station is 'PVU'.

== Industrial development ==
As part of the industry sector development plans of Kollam district, an IT Park would be setting up at Paravur Municipal area in an extent of 5 acres of land. The land can be acquired with the assistance of Land Use Board or Paravur Municipality. rail-Road linkages will be established. The Government also have plans to set up a Coir manufacturing unit and a Handloom unit at Paravur and considering the possibilities for setting up a food park also.

== Puttingal Devi temple ==
Puttingal Temple is a Hindu temple in the coastal town of Paravur, India. The temple was founded after the presence of the goddess was experienced on an ant hill with Puttu being the Malayalam word for ant Hill.

The main festival is celebrated on the day of Bharani star in Meenam. Fireworks and other events associated with the festival take place along with other cultural events with various poojas performed.

Paravur temple accident
On 10 April 2016, 114 people were killed due to a fireworks mishap at this temple, while over 350 other people were injured. A cracker fell on a shed where the fireworks were stored, setting off an explosion. Permission was not given to the temple by the authorities for the fireworks display and a case was registered.

== People from Paravur ==
- K. C. Kesava Pillai (1868-1914) poet
- Paravoor V. Kesavanasan(1859-1917) Social reformer, journalist
- G. Devarajan (1927-2006) music composer
- P. Ravindran (1922-1997) Politician Ex Minister
- C.V. Padmarajan Politician Ex Minister
- P. K. Gurudasan Politician Ex Minister

== Educational Institutions ==
- SNV Girls High School Paravur
- Kottapuram High School
- GLPS Kottapuram Paravur
- Government Higher Secondary School Thekkumbhagam Paravoor
- Govt Ups And Preprimary School Maniyamkulam Paravur
- Kaattukulam Government LP School
- koonayil Govt LPS School
- Govt. LP School, Kappil
- Government Girls LP School Kurumandal Paravur
- SIVARAJA PILLAI MEMORIAL ITC Paravur

== See also ==
- Paravur Lake
- Paravur temple accident
- Paravur Thekkumbhagam
- Chirakkara
- Puthenkulam
- Polachira
- Mavintamoodu
- Poothakkulam
- Pozhikkara
- Puttingal Temple
- Kollam Beach
- Kollam District

== Climate ==
Köppen-Geiger climate classification system classifies Paravur's climate as tropical wet and dry (Aw).

Climate data for Paravur
Month	Jan	Feb	Mar	Apr	May	Jun	Jul	Aug	Sep	Oct	Nov	Dec	Year
Mean daily maximum °C (°F)	30.2 (86.4)	30.9 (87.6)	31.9 (89.4)	31.9 (89.4)	31.4 (88.5)	29.2 (84.6)	28.8 (83.8)	29.1 (84.4)	29.4 (84.9)	29.5 (85.1)	29.3 (84.7)	29.6 (85.3)	30.1 (86.2)
Daily mean °C (°F)	26.4 (79.5)	27.1 (80.8)	28.2 (82.8)	28.6 (83.5)	28.3 (82.9)	26.5 (79.7)	26.1 (79.0)	26.4 (79.5)	26.6 (79.9)	26.6 (79.9)	26.4 (79.5)	26.1 (79.0)	26.9 (80.5)
Mean daily minimum °C (°F)	22.6 (72.7)	23.3 (73.9)	24.6 (76.3)	25.4 (77.7)	25.3 (77.5)	23.9 (75.0)	23.5 (74.3)	23.7 (74.7)	23.8 (74.8)	23.8 (74.8)	23.5 (74.3)	22.7 (72.9)	23.8 (74.9)
Source: Climate-Data.org
