= Poothakkulam =

Bhoothakkulam പൂതക്കുളം Bhoothakkulam
- Village
- Poothakkulam
- Nickname: Bkm
- Location in Kerala, India
- Country: India
- State: Kerala
- District: Kollam
- Tehsil: Ithikkara

Government
  - Body: Gram panchayat

Area
  - Total: 16.56 km^{2} (6.39 sq mi)

Population (2011)
  - Total: 29,447
  - Density: 1,778/km^{2} (4,606/sq mi)

Languages
  - Official: Malayalam, English
- Time zone: UTC+5:30 (IST)
- PIN: 691302
- Vehicle registration: KL-02
- Nearest city: Kollam

Poothakkulam, also known as Bhoothakkulam, is a village in Kollam district in the state of Kerala, India. The village is located 3.9 km away from Paravur, 11.4 km from Varkala and 23 km from Kollam. In 2011, it had a population of 29,447 residents. The village covers an area of 16.56 km^{2}.

== Geography ==
Poothakkulam is located in the southernmost portion of the Kollam district near Idava Nadayara Kayal. The village is bordered by the Paravur municipality in the west, Parippally Panchayath in the east, Chirakkara Panchayath in the north, and the Thiruvananthapuram district in the south.

=== Topography ===
Poothakkulam's elevation is close to sea level, showing at the nearby Bhoothakulam reservoir(paanattu chira) and surrounding paddy fields.

== Educational institutions ==
- Govt Higher Secondary School, Bhoothakkulam
- Chempakassey Higher Secondary School, Bhoothakkulam
- Bhoothakulam North LPS
- Bhoothakulam South LPS
- Kalakkode UPS, Kalakkode
- Harisree Nursery & LP School, Bhoothakkulam
- D.V.L.P.S Puthenkulam,(Devaraja Vilasom L.P School)

== Transportation ==
The nearest airport is Thiruvananthapuram International Airport (49.8 km) and the nearest railway station is Paravur Railway station (4.5 km). The major road passing through Poothakkulam is Paravur -Parippalli road.

=== Air ===
The nearest airport is Thiruvananthapuram International Airport (49.8 km)

=== Rail ===
Paravur Railway station (4.5 km)

Varkala Sivagiri railway station(13 km)

=== Road ===
Bhoothakulam is well connected to nearby places through roads. Road transport is provided mainly by private transport bus operators and state owned Kerala State Road Transport Corporation.

==== Major roads ====
- Paravur - Paripppally Road
- Bhoothakulam- Ooninmoodu-Varkala Road
- Alinmoodu- Ozhukupara Road
- Vettuvila - Kalakkodu
- Kalakkodu - Bhoothakkulam

== Industry ==
Coir, cashew nuts and hand loom are the major industries of Poothakkulam. Kalakkod Q 23 Co-operative society was established as the first Coir society in Poothakkulam.

== Administration ==
2025 Local Body Election – Poothakkulam Grama Panchayat
Ward No	Ward name	Member	Party	Alliance
1	Kottuvankonam	Athul S	CPI(M)	LDF
2	Mukkada	Sivan Palottkavu	BJP	NDA
3	Koonamkulam	Raji	CPI(M)	LDF
4	Village Office	V. K. Sunil Kumar	BJP	NDA
5	Puthenkulam	Laila Joy	CPI(M)	LDF
6	Ezhamvila	Chippi Chandran	BJP	NDA
7	Panchayath Office	J. Pradeep (Anikutten)	CPI(M)	LDF
8	Poothakulam HSS	Sajeesh (Appu Mankuttam)	BJP	NDA
9	Oonninmoodu	Sreeja S	BJP	NDA
10	Punnekkulam	Biji	CPI(M)	LDF
11	Edayadi	Jasmi J S	INC	UDF
12	Stadium	Ram Rajan (Raman)	BJP	NDA
13	Nellettil	Beena	INC	UDF
14	Mavila	Bindu S	INC	UDF
15	Edavattom	Indu S R	CPI(M)	LDF
16	Kalakkodu	Suresh C	CPI(M)	LDF
17	P.H.C	Naushad R	CPI(M)	LDF
18	Perumkulam	Sheela Kumari	CPI(M)	LDF
19	Njarodu	Geetha	CPI(M)	LDF

Poothakkulam is an ISO 9001-2015 certified grama panchayat. It consists of 18 wards and is currently led by Left Democratic Front (Kerala).

2020 Local Body Election - Kerala Source Source
Ward No	Ward name	Member	Party	Alliance
1	Kottuvankonam	Rakhi R S	BJP	NDA
2	Mukkada	Jaya V G	CPI	LDF
3	Koonamkulam	Pradeep	CPI(M)	LDF
4	Puthenkulam	Remya S	CPI	LDF
5	Ooninmoodu	Laila	CPI(M)	LDF
6	Ezhamvila	Shaiju Balachandran	INC	UDF
7	Poothakulam	Prakash	CPI(M)	LDF
8	H.S Ward	Manjusha Sathysheelan	BJP	NDA
9	Punnekulam	D Suresh Kumar	CPI(M)	LDF
10	Edayadi	Manish	INC	UDF
11	Stadium	Prasannakumari	CPI(M)	LDF
12	Nellettil	Ansari Fazil	CPI(M)	LDF
13	മാവിള	Sunil Kumar	INC	UDF
14	Edavattom	Sajeesh	BJP	NDA
15	Kalakkode	Jeeja Santhosh	CPI	LDF
16	P.H.C	Ammini Amma	CPI(M)	LDF
17	Perumkulam	Seena R	CPI(M)	LDF
18	Njarodu	Shaji Kumar	CPI(M)	LDF

The incumbent Panchayat president is Ammini Amma who contested and won from P.H.C Ward.

Poothakkulam is part of Chathannoor (State Assembly constituency) State Assembly constituency, Ithikkara Block Panchayath, Kollam District Panchayat and Kollam (Lok Sabha constituency)

=== Recognition ===
Titles /Recognitions for Grama Panchayth
No	Year	Title
1	2018-2019	Swaraj Trophy for Best Local Body, Kollam District (2018–19)
2	2017-2018	Swaraj Trophy for Second Best Local Body, Kollam District
3	2019	Second "Tharishu" Rahitha Grama Panchayath in Kerala
4	2019	Govt. of Kerala Haritha Award
5	NA	Suchitwa Keralam Award
6	20186-2017	R. Sugathakumaran Memorial Trophy for Best Gram Panchayat

Poothakkulam Panchayath falls under the jurisdiction of Paravur circle inspector.

== Culture ==
Poothakkulam has a rich cultural heritage. The village contains numerous libraries, cultural societies, and organizations.

Sankara Pillai smaraka grantha sala, Gandhi memorial reading room and Samskarika Nilayam kottuvankonam are some major libraries.

Poothakulam village has numerous captive elephants.

=== Libraries ===
- Shankarapilla Memorial Library
- Priyadharshini Memorial Library& Reading room
- Public Library, Kottuvankonam
- Gandhi Memorial Reading Club & Library, Kalakkode
- Reading room, Paravila
- Yuvareshmi arts&sports club, library&reading room aalintemoodu(panchayath office junction)

==== Recreational centres ====
1. Kalipoyka Children Park
2. GHSS Football Stadium
3. Mini stadium, Bhoothakulam
4. Kaveri Elephant Park, Puthenkulam
5. Pachayath Park, Kalakkode

== Services ==
=== Hospitals ===
- Government Homeo Dispensary, Poothakkulam
- Community Health Center, Kalakkode
- Government Ayurveda Dispensary, Poothakkulam
- Karthika Hospital, Mavila
- Mohan's Hospital, Edayadi
- Murari Hospital, Ammarathumukku
- JJ Hospital, Puthenkulam
- Santhosh Hospital, Puthenkulam

=== Financial institutions ===
- Bhoothakulam Service Co-Operative Bank
- Kalakkode Service Co-operative bank
- Indian Overseas Bank, Puthenkulam
- Catholic Syrian Bank, Ooninmoodu

== Places of worship ==
- Bhoothakulam Sree Dharma Shastha Temple, Bhothakulam

- Ezhamvila Sree Bhadrakali Temple, Bhoothakulam

- Vaikundapuram Mahavishnu Temple, Bhoothakulam

- Punnekulam Temple, Chempakassery

- Mahavishnu Temple, Kottuvankonam

- Mecheryil Bhadra Devi Temple, Bhoothakulam

- Appupan Kavu temple, Bhoothakulam

- Pallathil Kavu temple, Edayadi

- parashumoottil MAHADEVA temple

- koonamkulam krishna temple

- Aalintemoodu krishna temple

- Little flower church (കൊച്ചുത്രേസ്യ പള്ളി)
