= Thekkumbhagam =

Thekkumbhagam Thekkumbhagom
- Neighbourhood
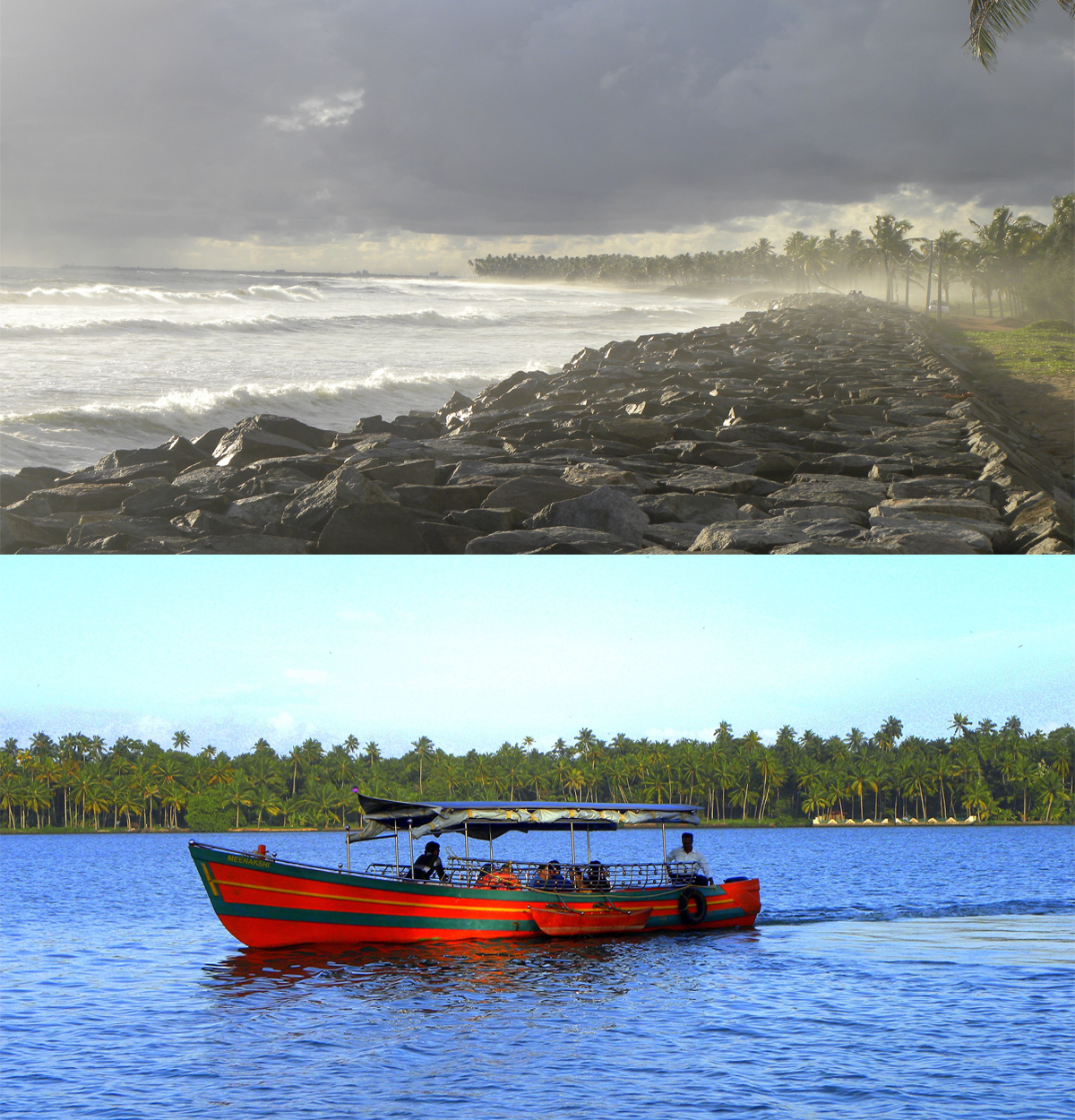
- Thekkumbhagam Coast, Boating at Thekkumbhagam Lake,

- Location in Kerala, India
- Coordinates: 8.798°N 76.667°E
- Country: India
- State: Kerala
- District: Kollam
- Civic body: Paravur Municipality

Languages
  - Official: Malayalam, English
- Time zone: UTC+5:30 (IST)
- PIN: 691319
- Telephone code: 0474
- Vehicle registration: KL-02
- Nearest city: Kollam - 14 km
- Nearest town: Paravur - 4 km
- Website: www.paravuronline.com www.paravurmunicipality.in//

Thekkumbhagam or Thekkumbhagom is the western coastal town of Paravur municipality in the Kollam district of Kerala, India. It is located at the South-western tip of Kollam's coastal area. It is in the Arabian Sea coast. Thekkumbhagam-Kappil estuary point in the Kollam-Thiruvananthapuram coastal border is one of the emerging tourism spots in the state. On 1936, during formation, Thekkumbhagam was one of the nine territories of Paravur Panchayath. Thekkumbhagam estuary is one among the twin estuary points in Paravur. The other one is Pozhikara estuary.

Thekkumbhagam is a shooting spot. Few shots of Aamir Khan's latest Laal Singh Chaddha done at Thekkumbhagam during December 2019.

== Estuary of Paravur ==
Paravur's three sides are surrounded by water bodies - Paravur Lake, Nadayara Lake and Arabian Sea. The town's north and south tips each have a peninsula and estuary. Thekkumbhagam is at its south, where its estuary draws the biggest crowds in the state. It is located at the south-western coastal border of Kollam-Thiruvananthapuram districts. A beach in this location attracts crowds every day. The estuary can be accessed by travelling through Paravur-Kappil-Varkala road.

== Nearby tourist sites ==
- Paravur - The temple town of Kollam
- Puthenpalli Jumua Masjid- one of the oldest masjids in south Kerala (about 750 years)
- Pudiyidam Mahadeva Temple.
- Thekkumbhagam-Kappil beach and estuary
- Priyadarshini Boat Club
- Paravur Lake
- Pozhikara estuary
- Polachira wetlands
- Puthenkulam Elephant Village

== See also ==
- Paravur
- Pozhikkara
- Nedungolam
- Paravur Kayal
- Paravur railway station

== Gallery ==
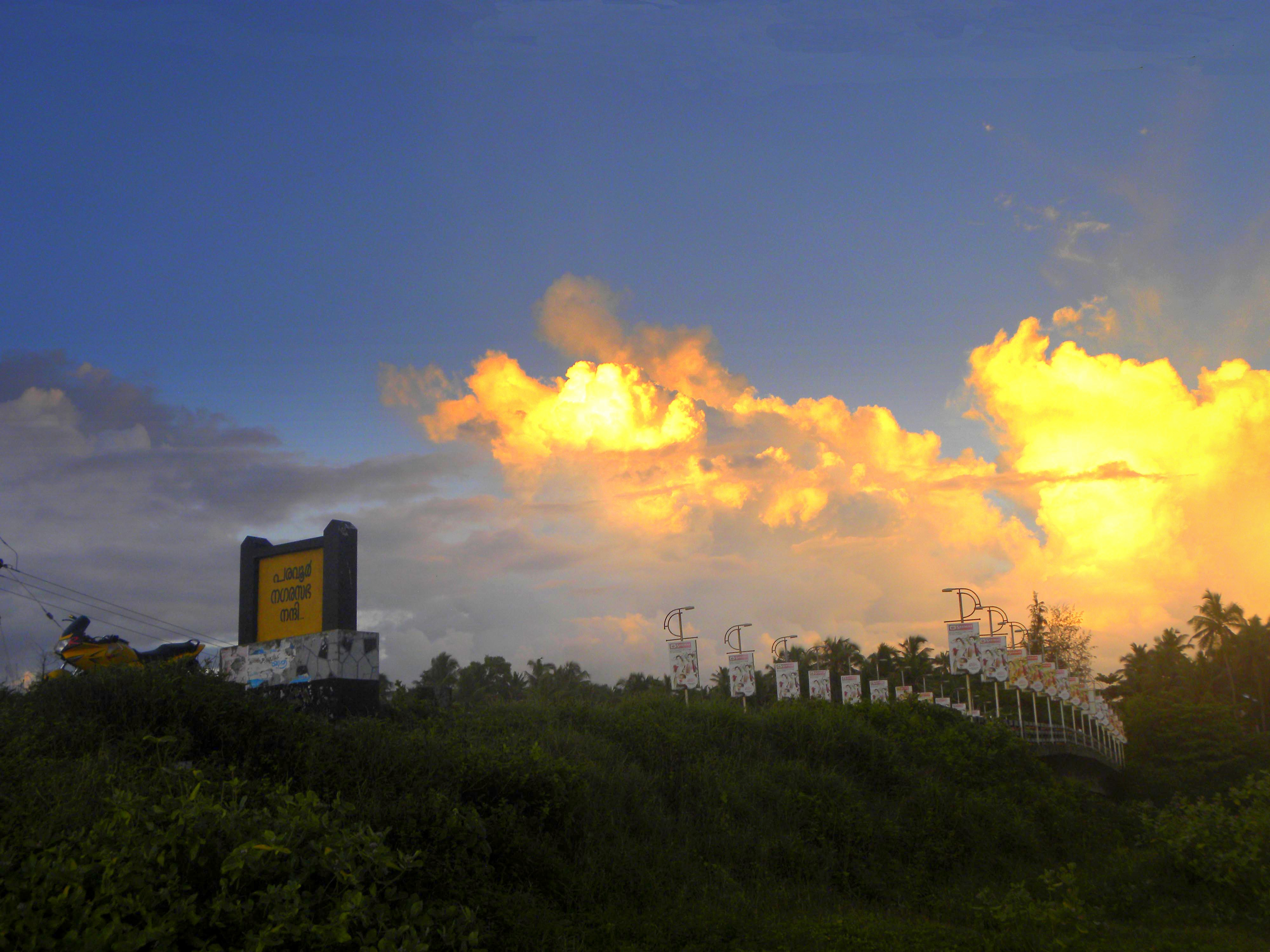
Kollam district border at Kappil Bridge

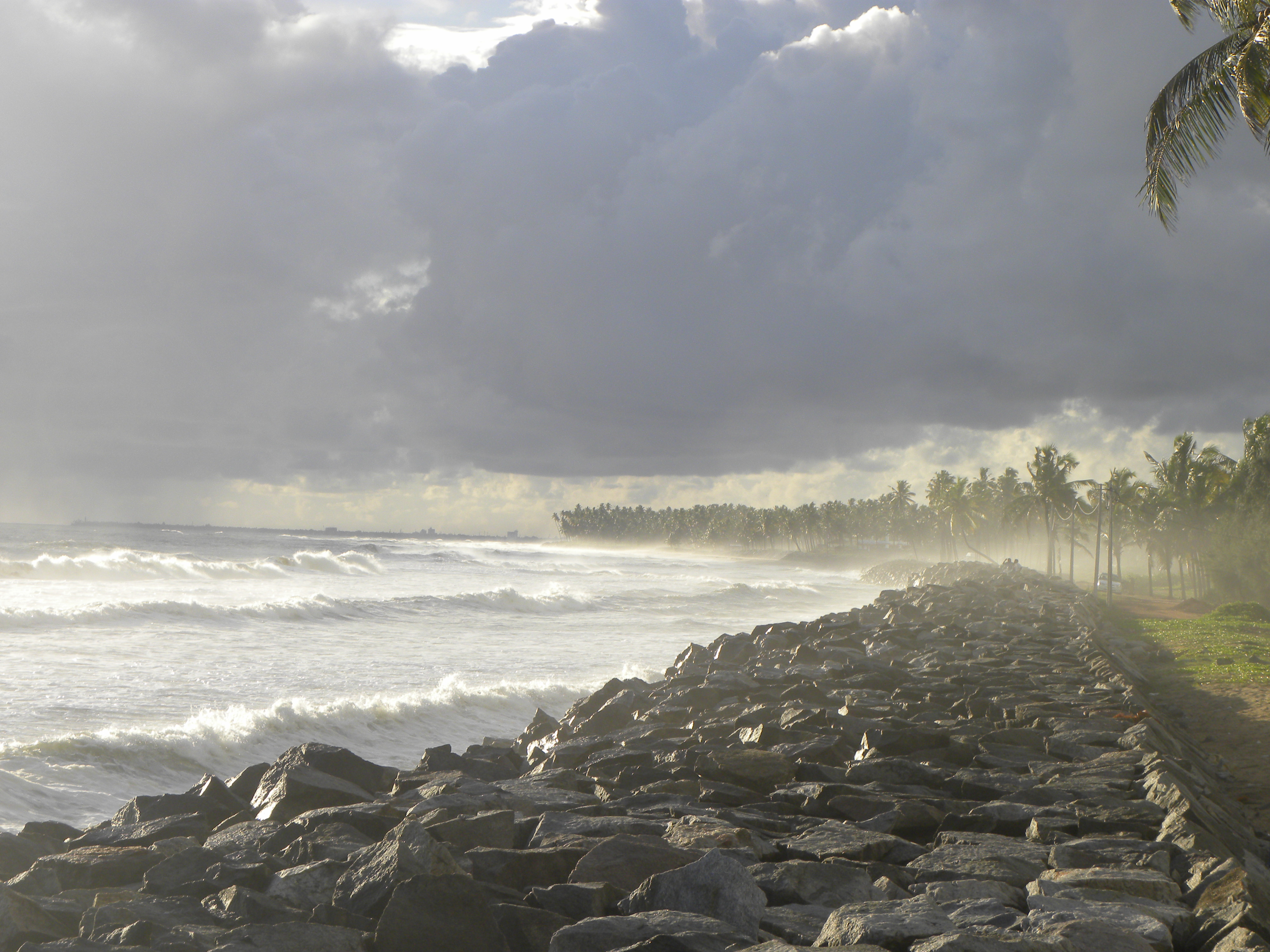
Thekkumbhagam Coast in Paravur

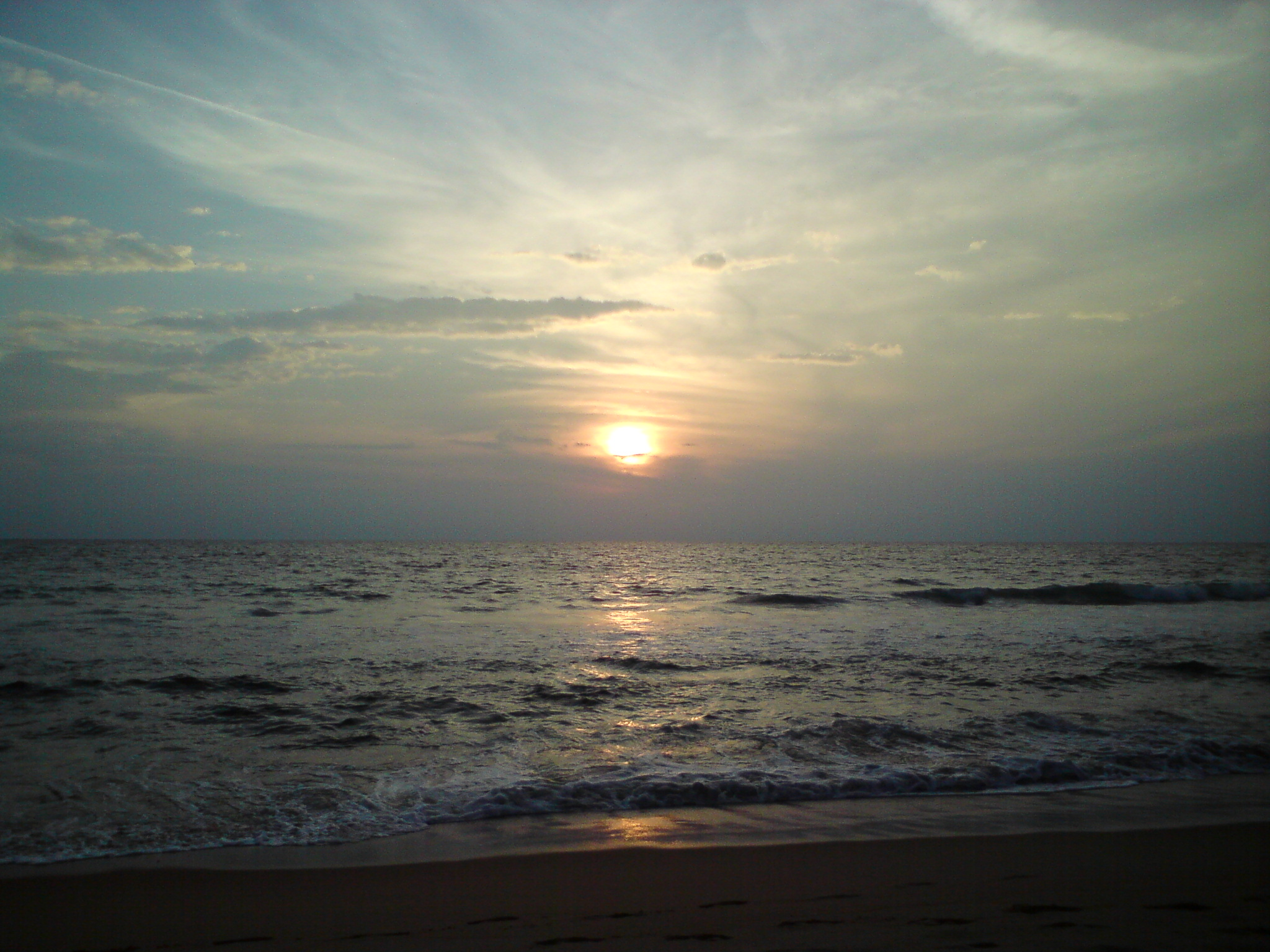
Sunset at Paravur Thekkumbhagam beach

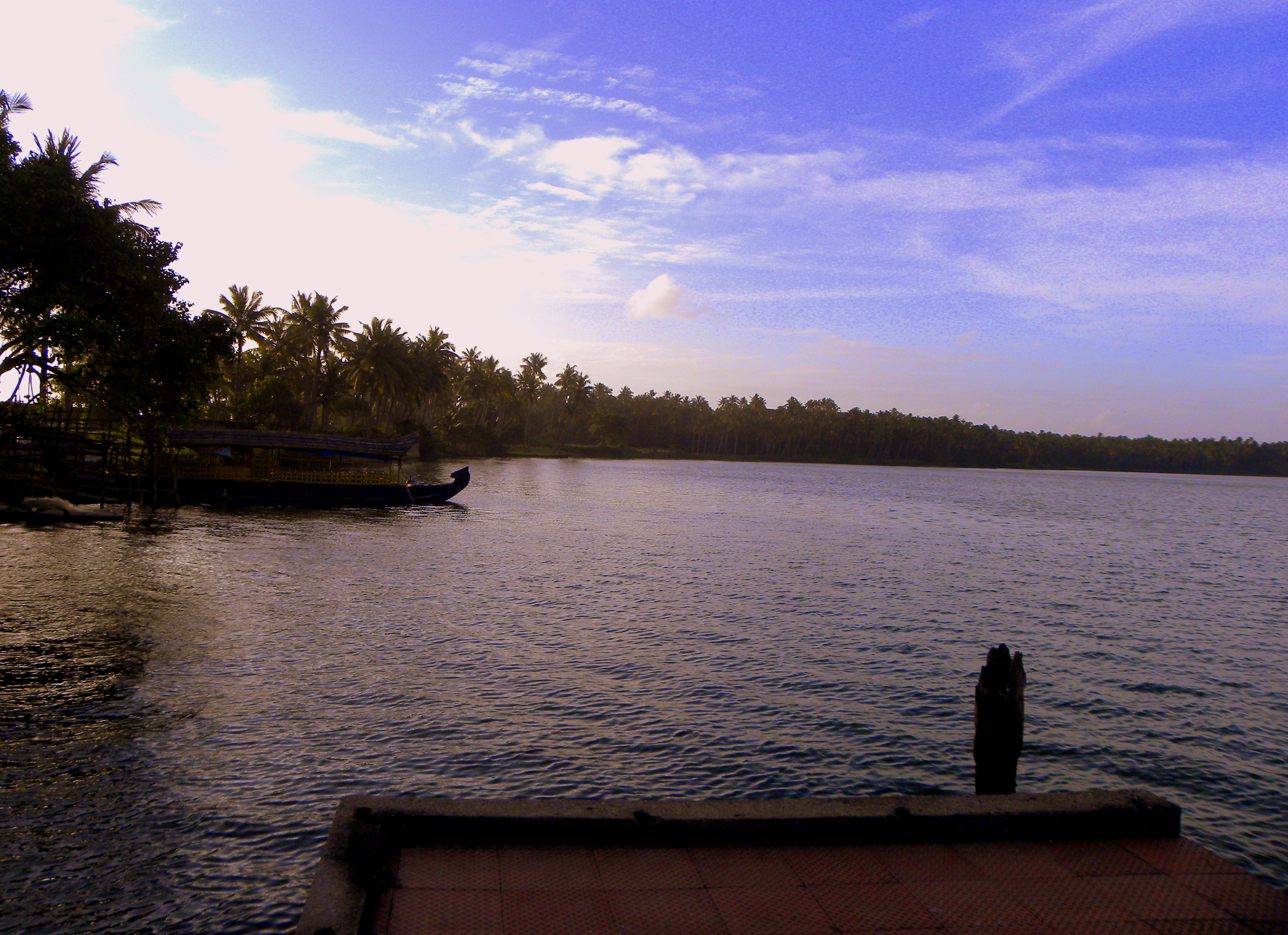
Paravur Lake, Kollam - An evening scene from Paravur Thekkumbhagam

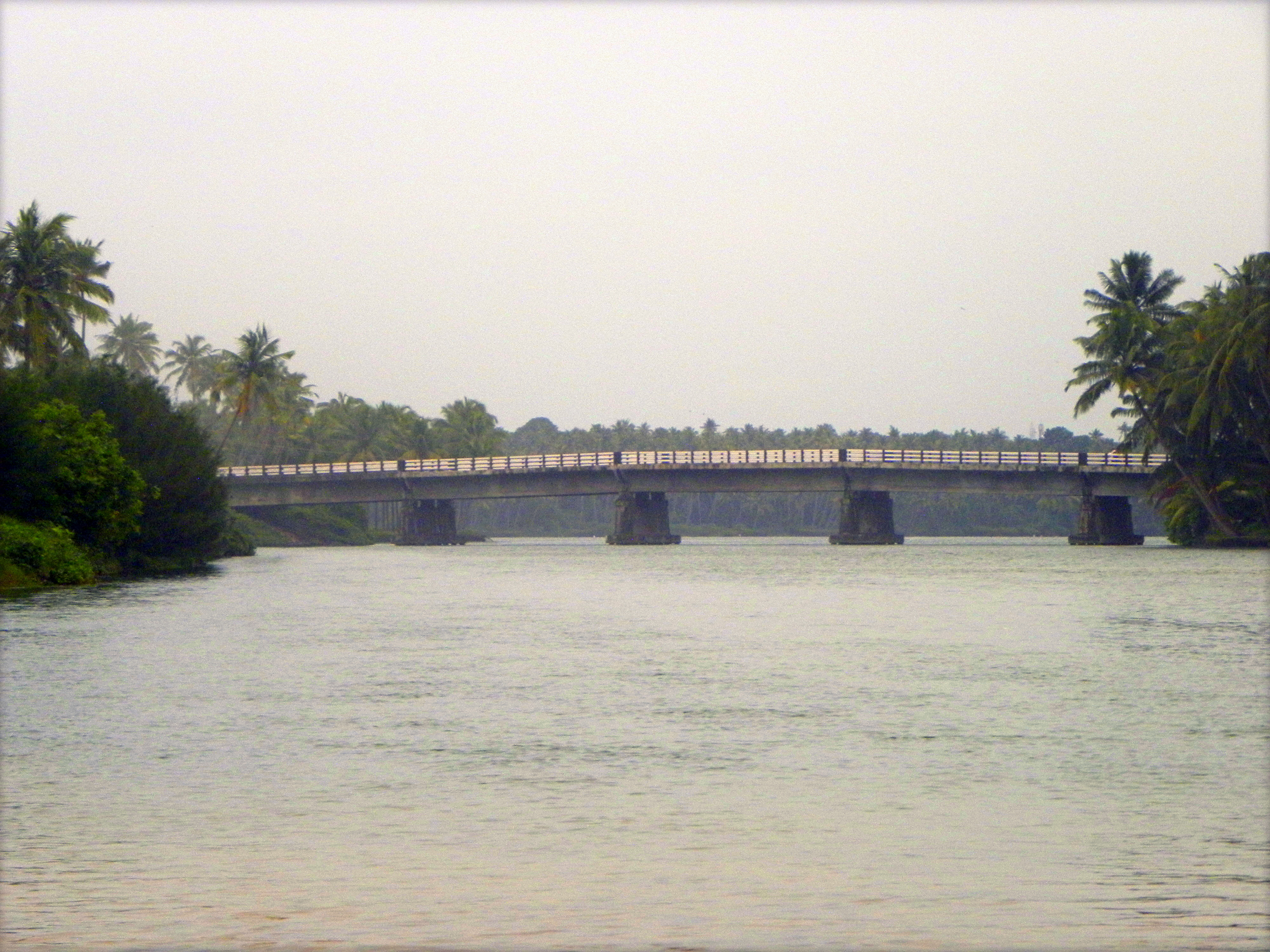
Thekkumbhagam-Kappil bridge

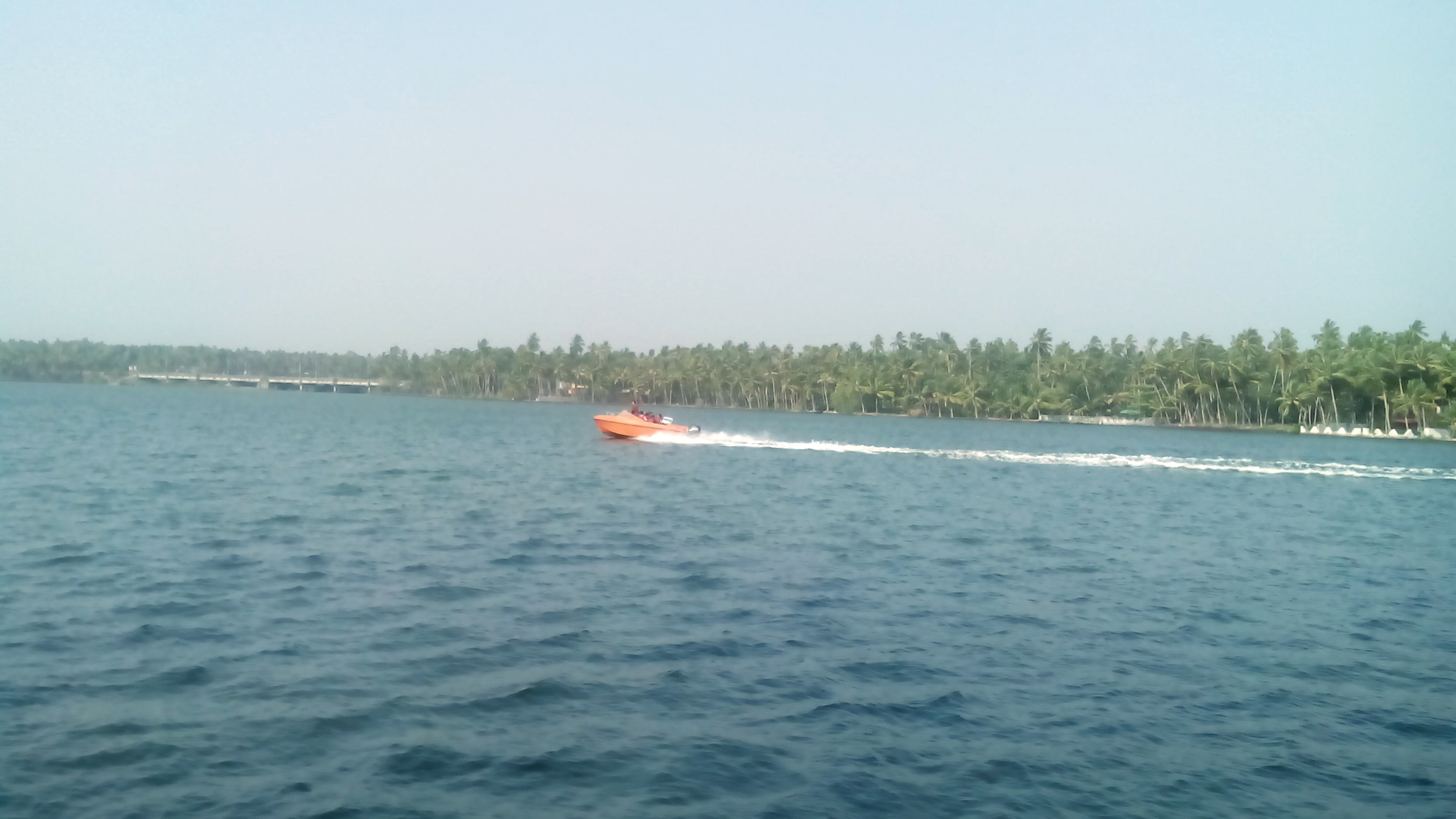
Boating at Paravur Lake - A regular scene from Paravur Thekkumbhagam

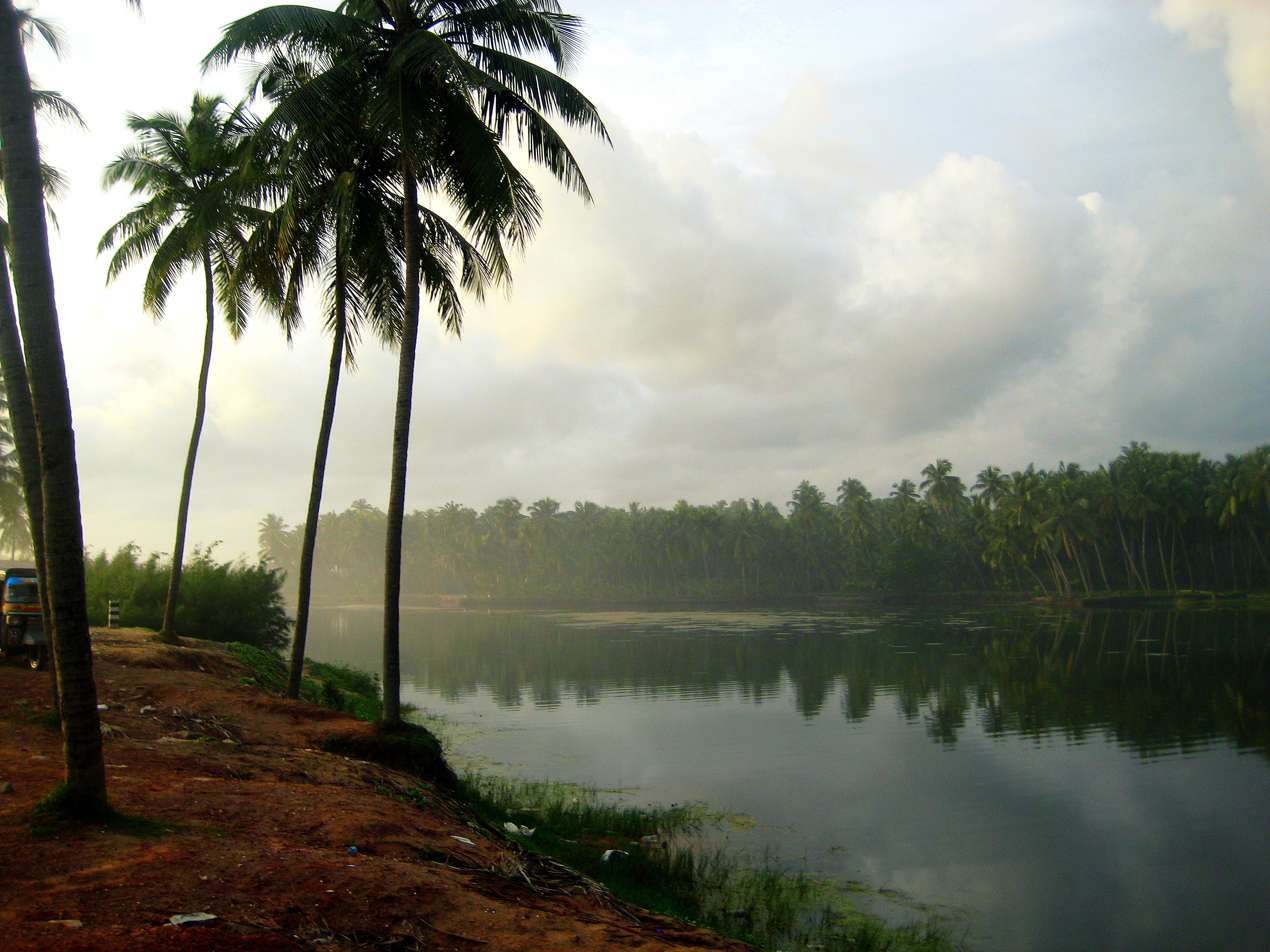
Estuary in Paravur Thekkumbhagam

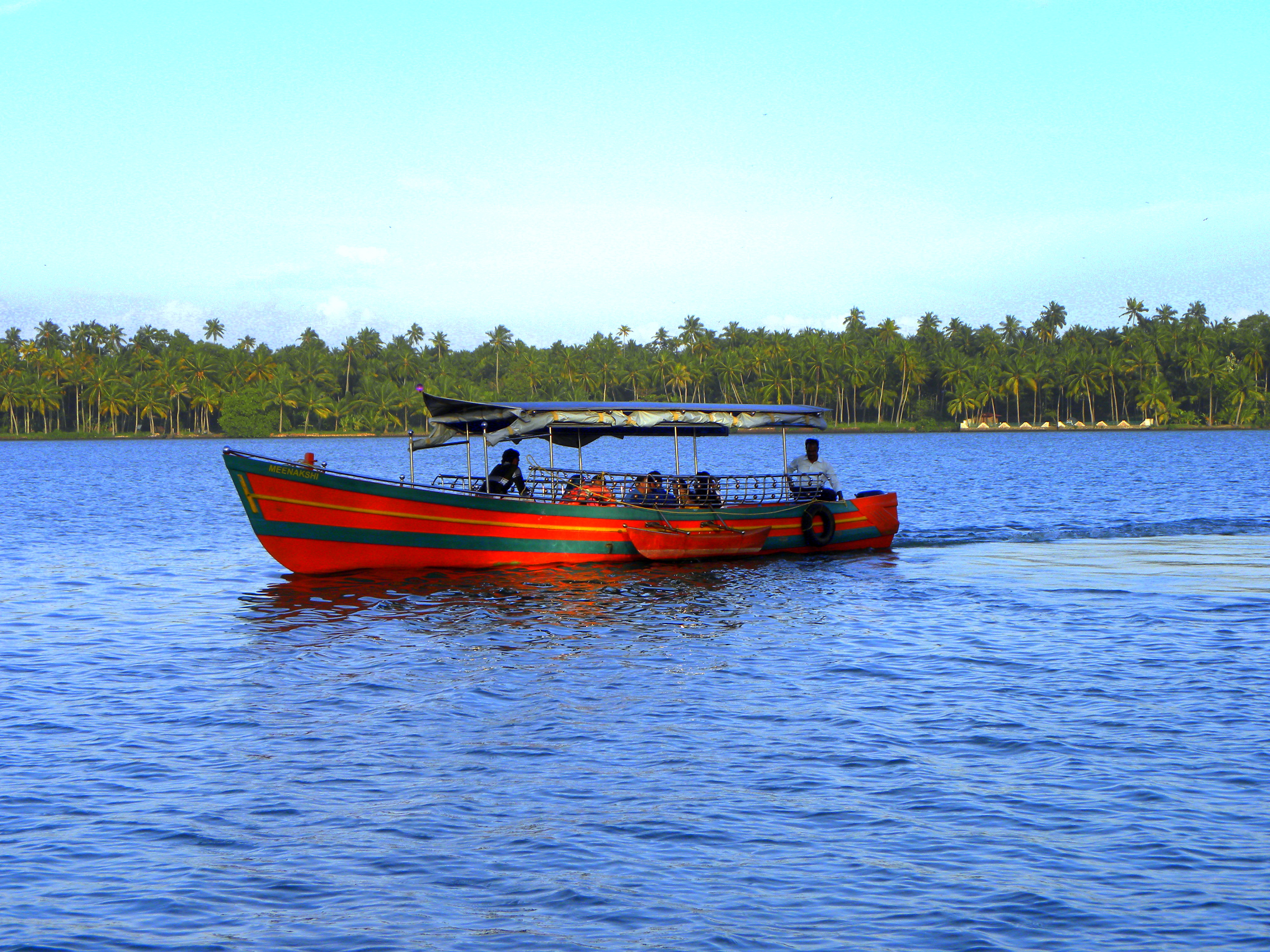
Boating at Paravur Lake

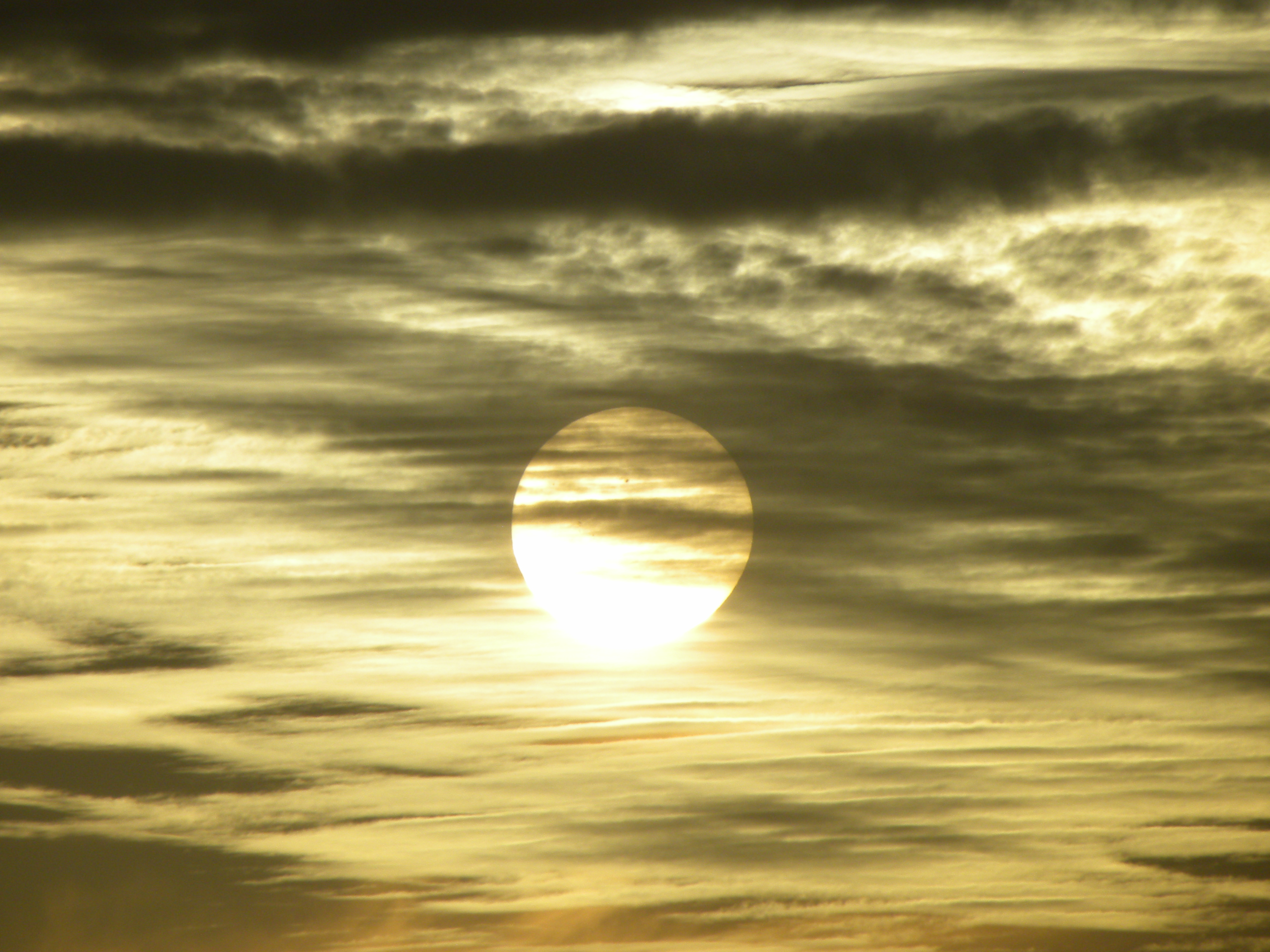
Sunset scene from Paravur Thekkumbhagam

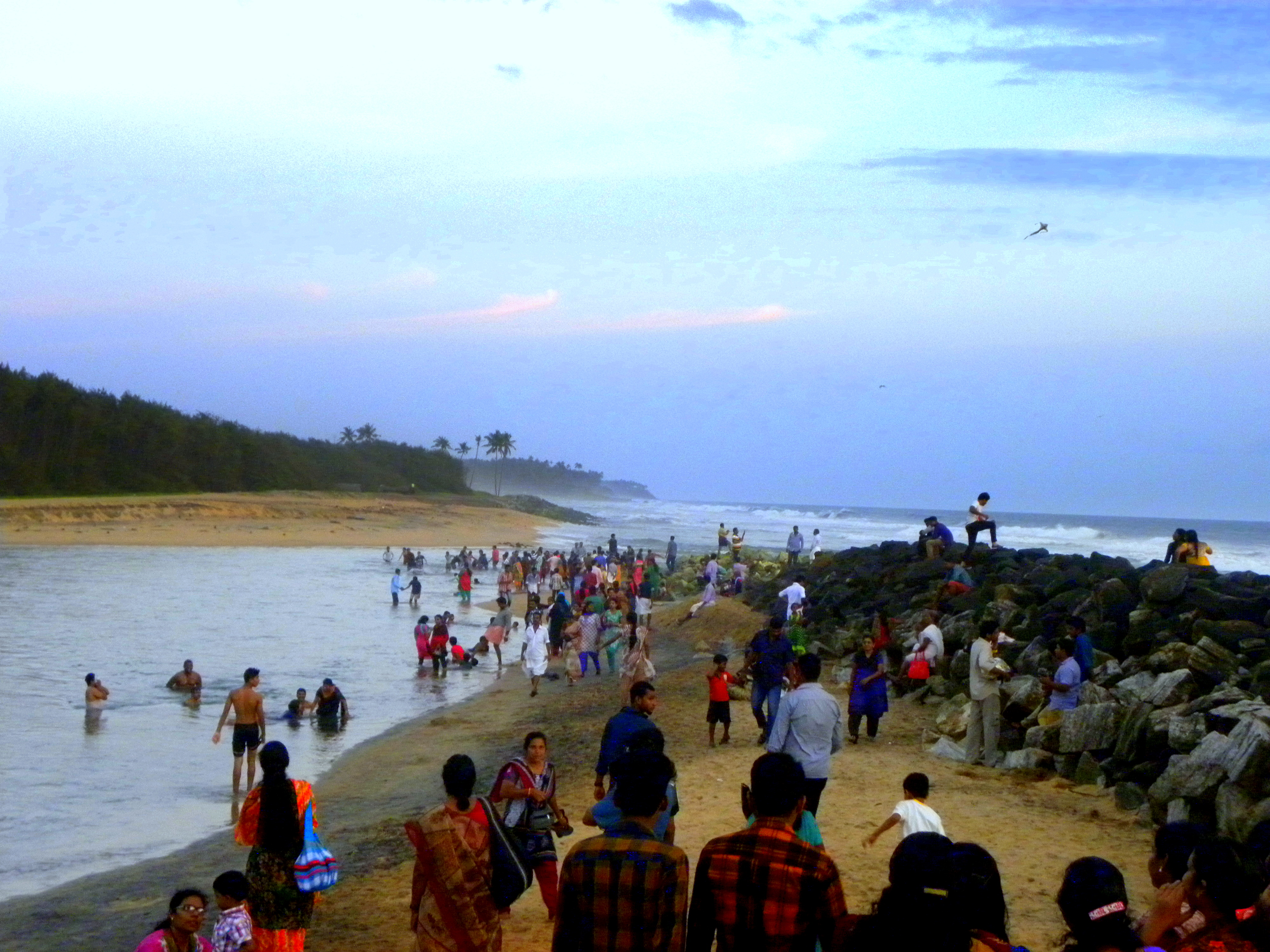
Thekkumbhagam Estuary, Paravur

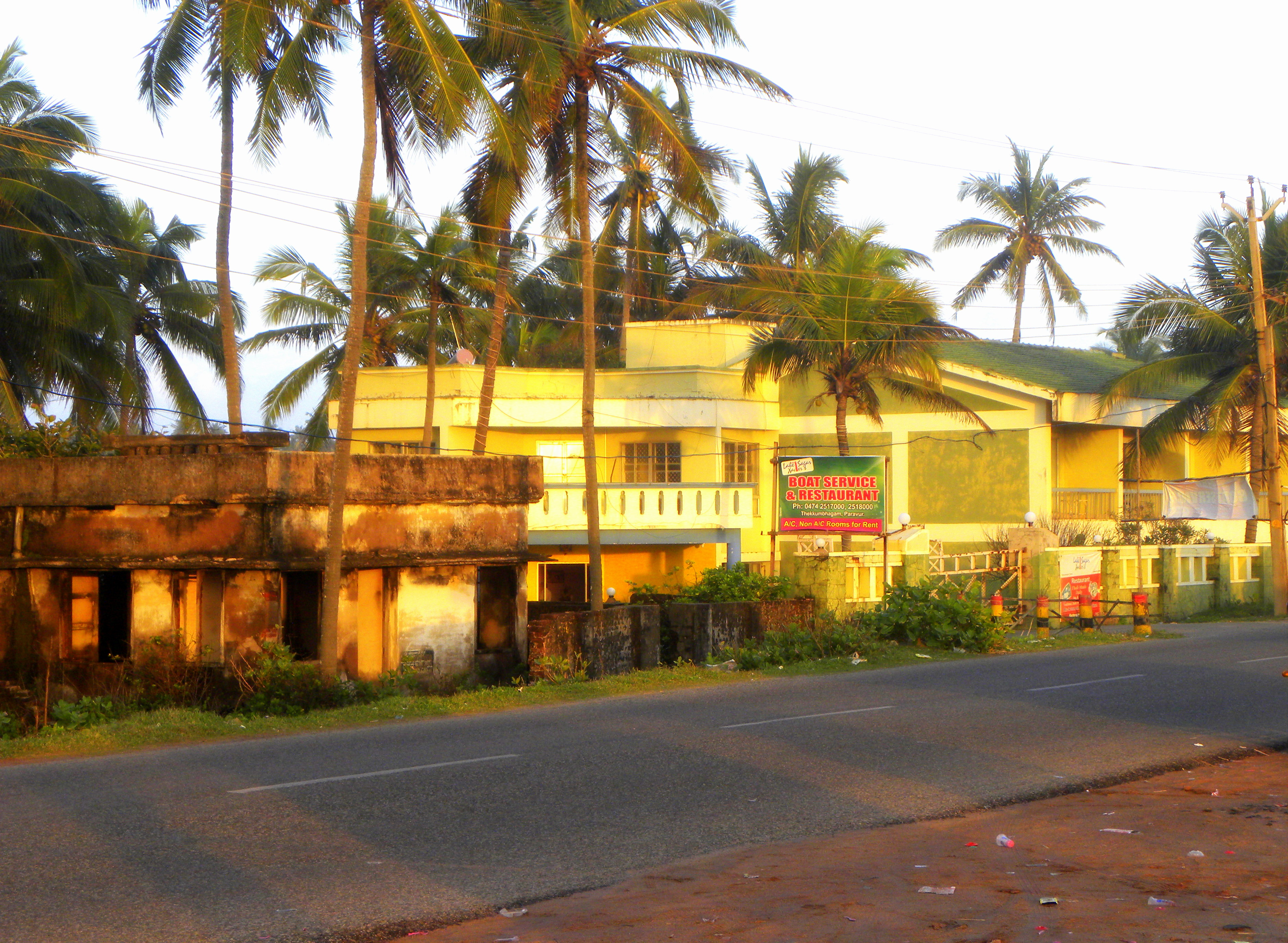
Lakesagar Xavier's Resort, Paravur Thekkumbhagam

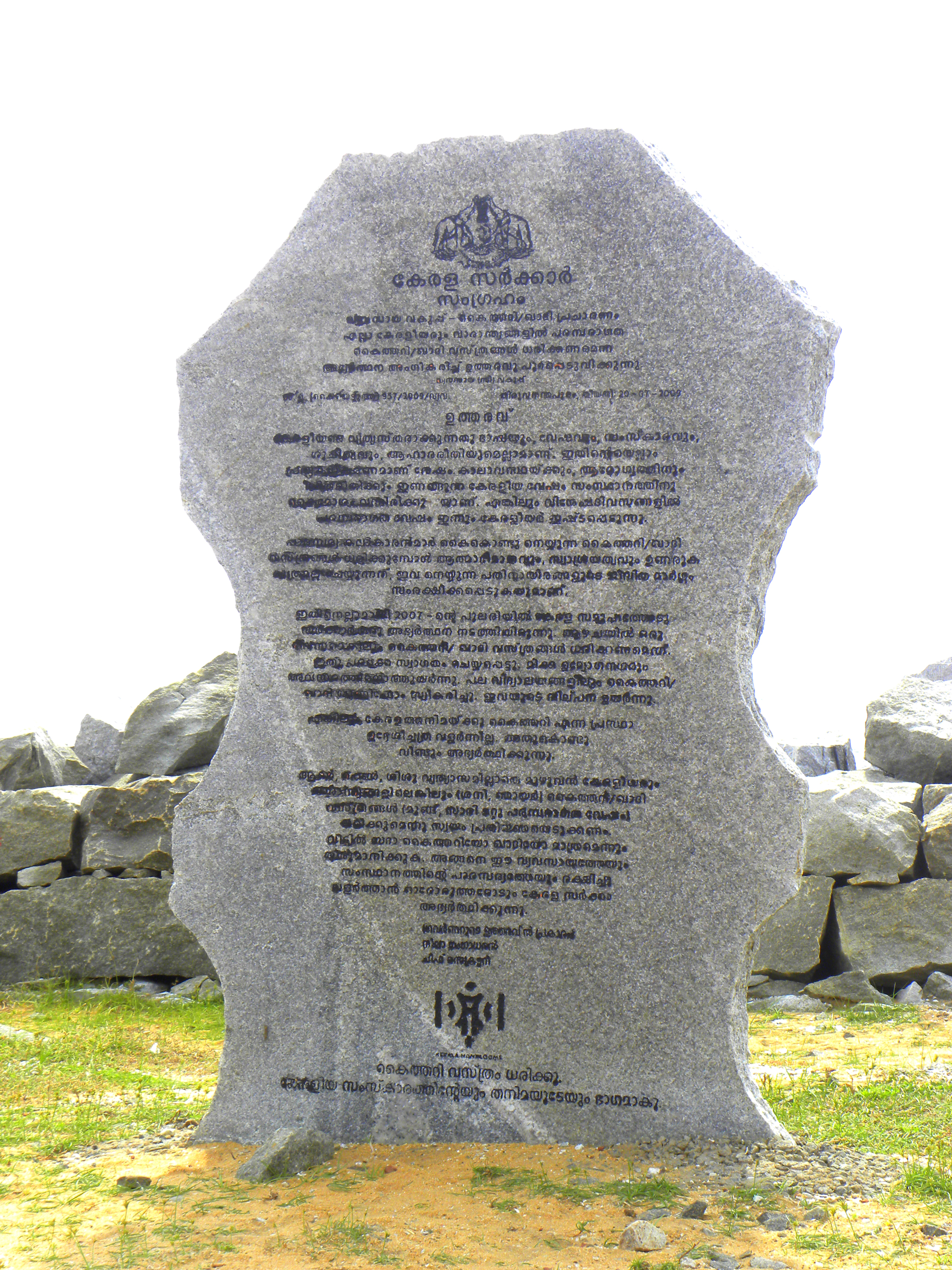
A Govt. notice board at Thekkumbhagam Beach

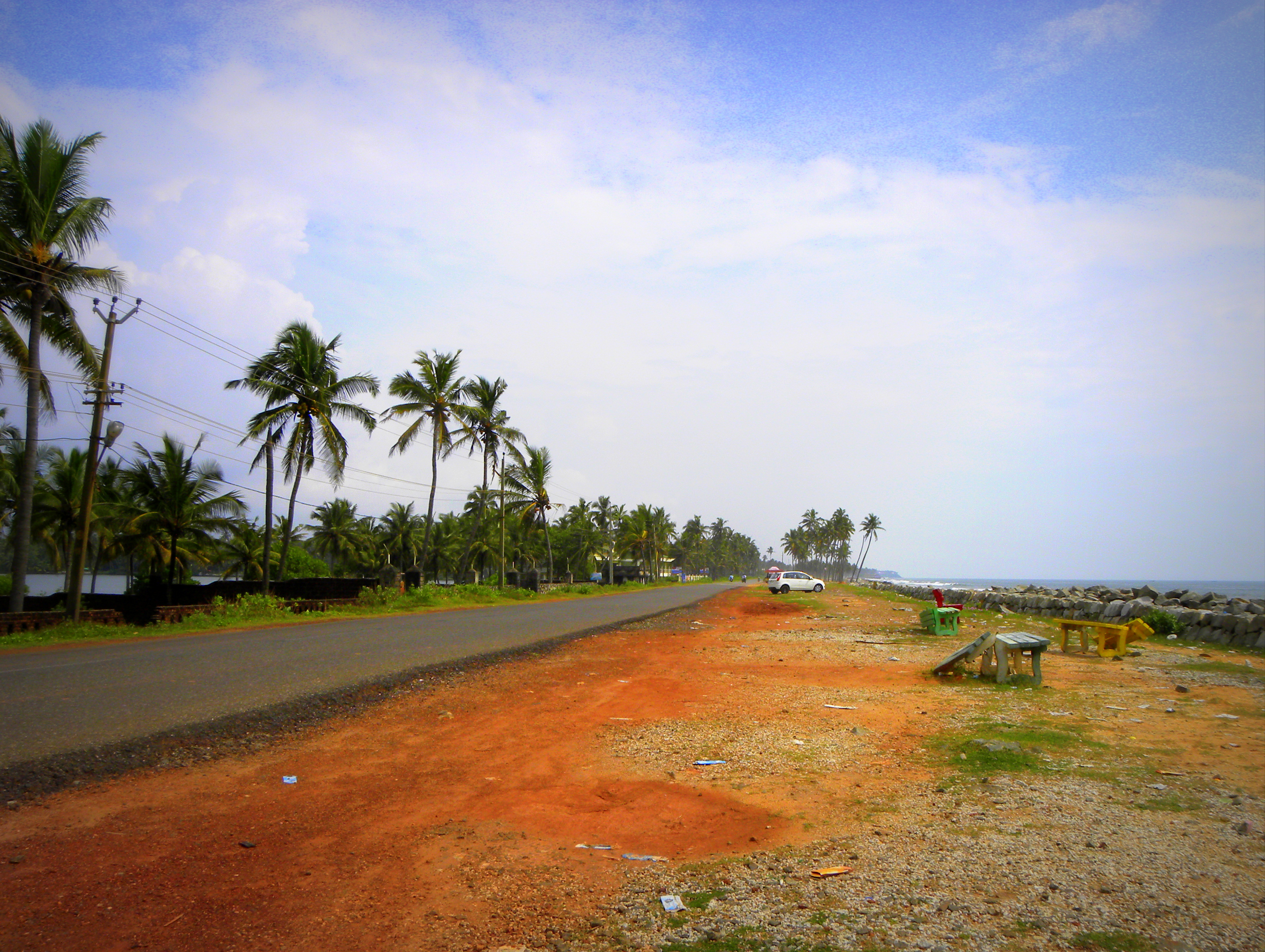
Paravur-Varkala Coastal Road at Thekkumbhagam

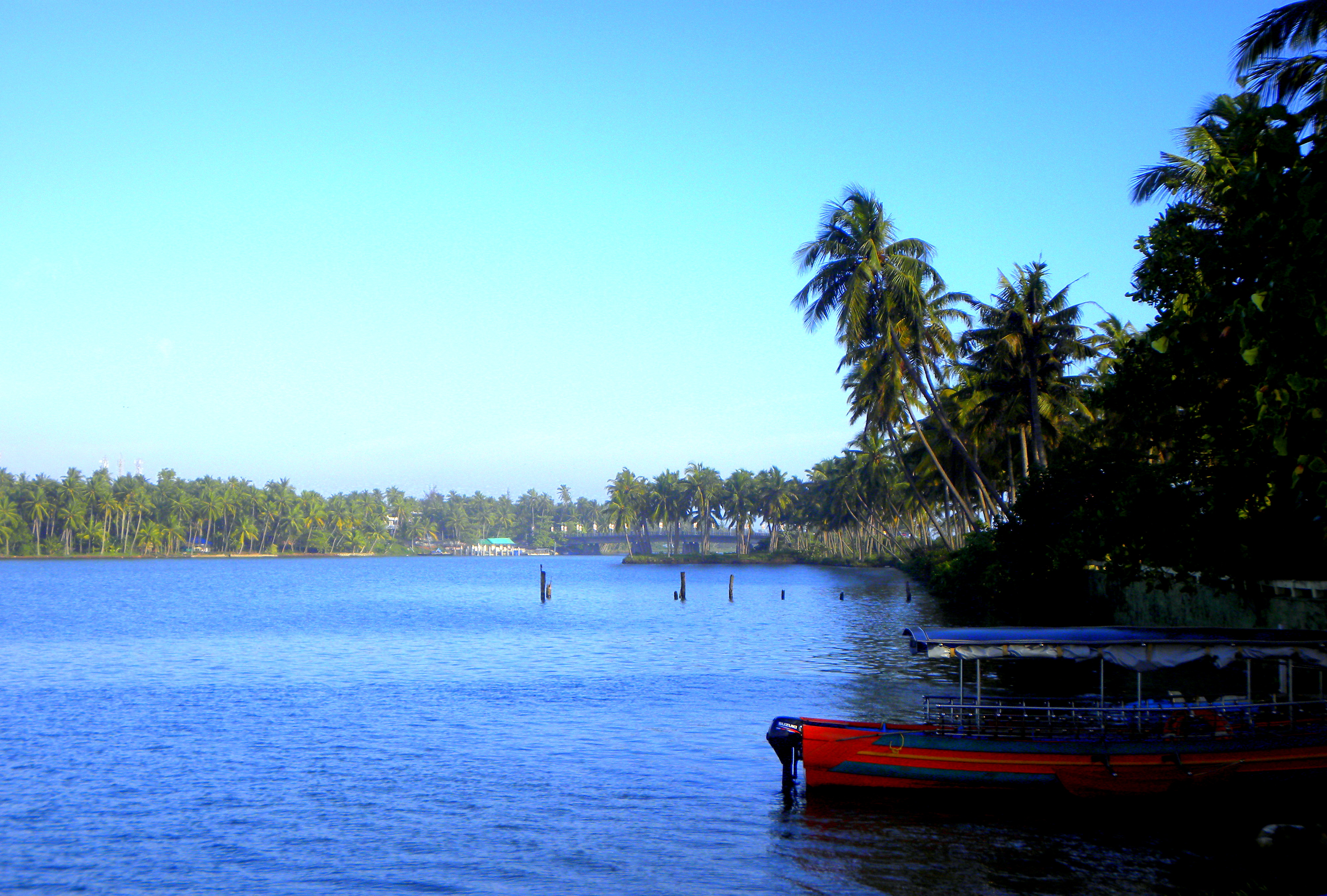
Boat near Paravur Lakesagar resort

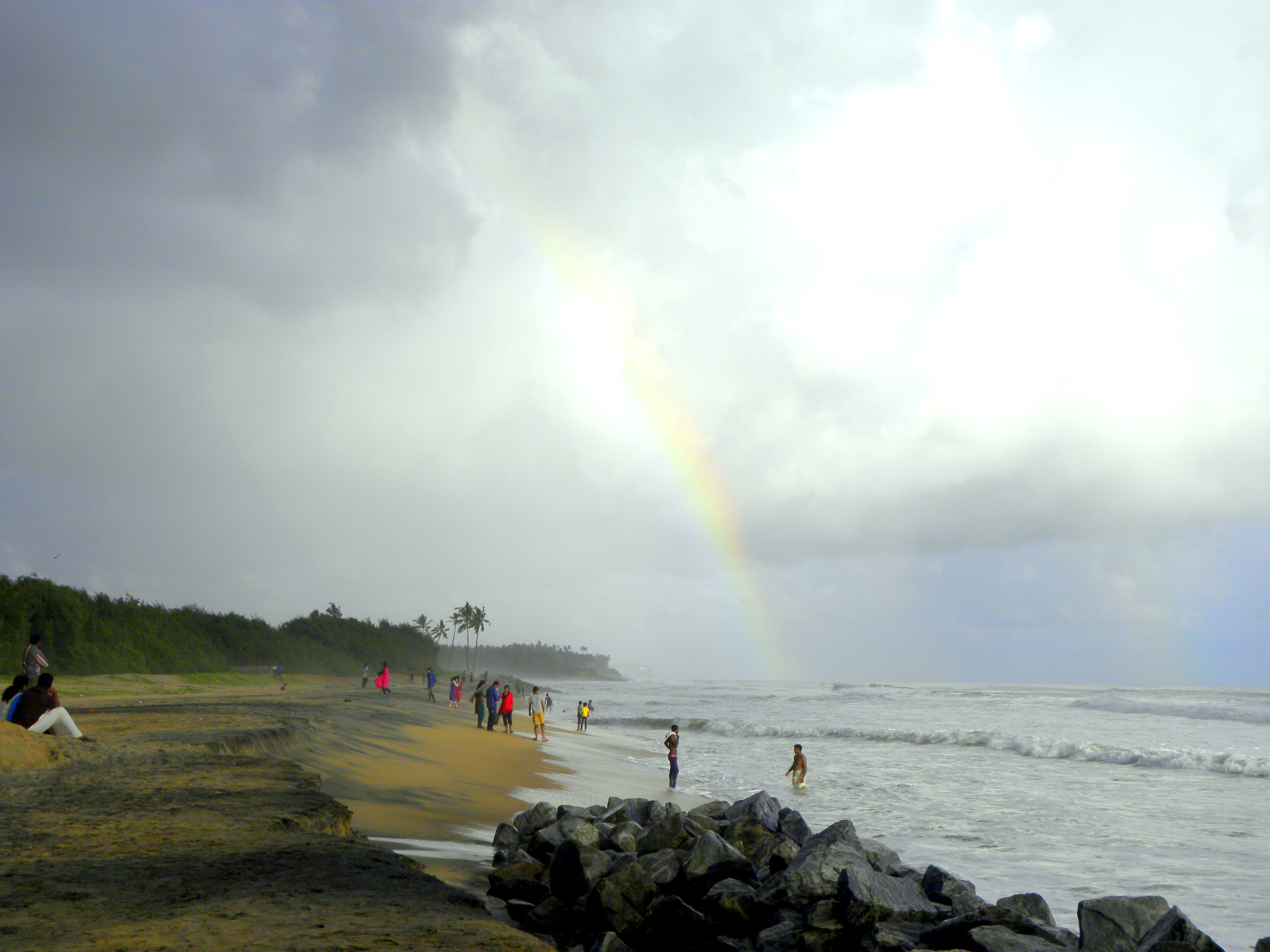
Rainbow at Thekkumbhagam coast
