= Ithikkara =

- village
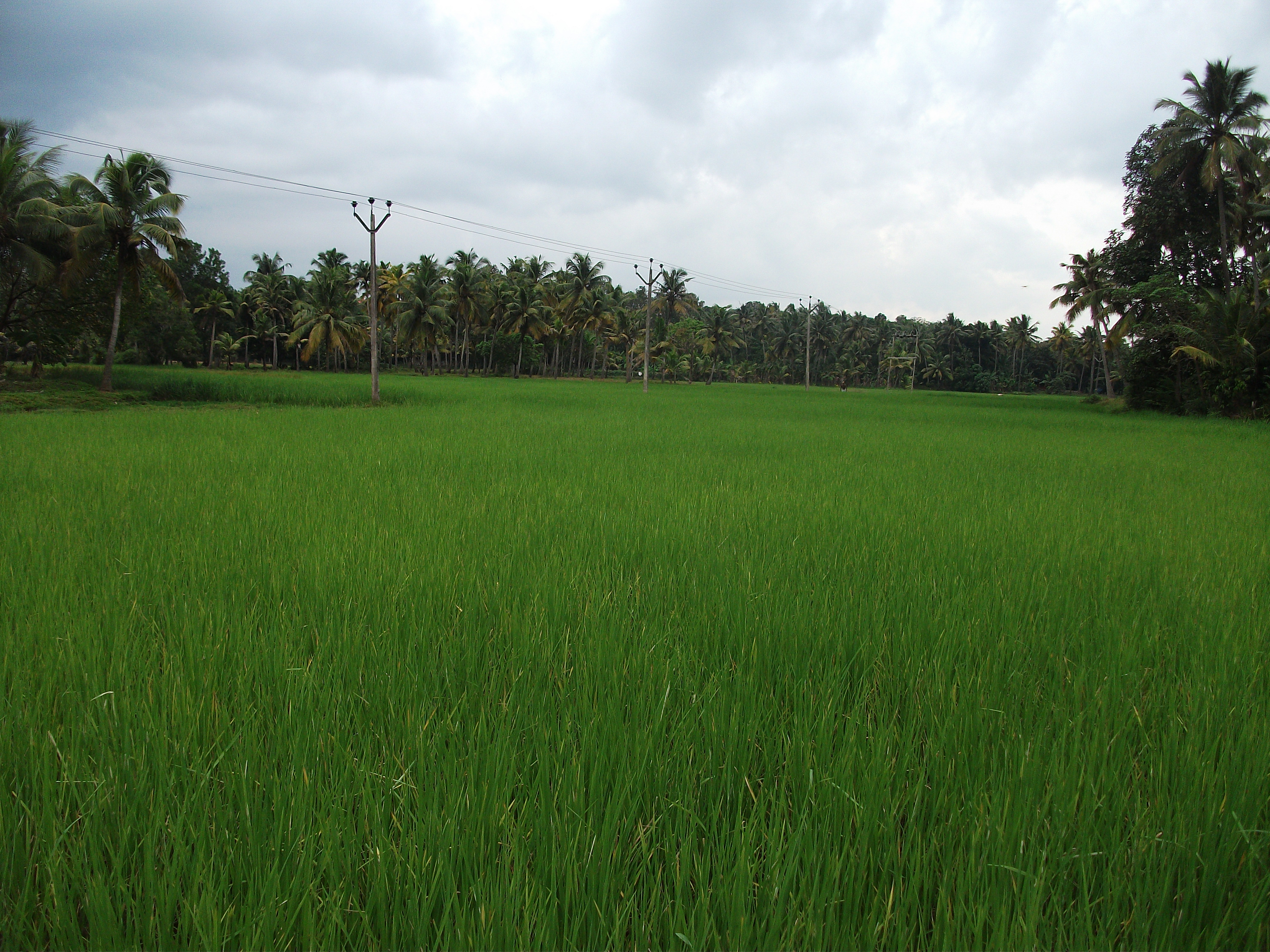
- A view of Ithikkara paddy fields
- Interactive map of Ithikkara
- Coordinates: 8°51′48″N 76°41′50″E
- Country: India
- State: Kerala
- District: Kollam

Population (2001)
  - Total: 185,008
  - Density: 1,372/km^{2} (3,550/sq mi)

Languages
  - Official: Malayalam, English
- Time zone: UTC+5:30 (IST)
- PIN: 691571
- Telephone code: 0474
- Vehicle registration: KL-02
- Nearest city: Kollam
- Sex ratio: 1073 ♂/♀
- Literacy: 89.2%
- Lok Sabha constituency: Kollam

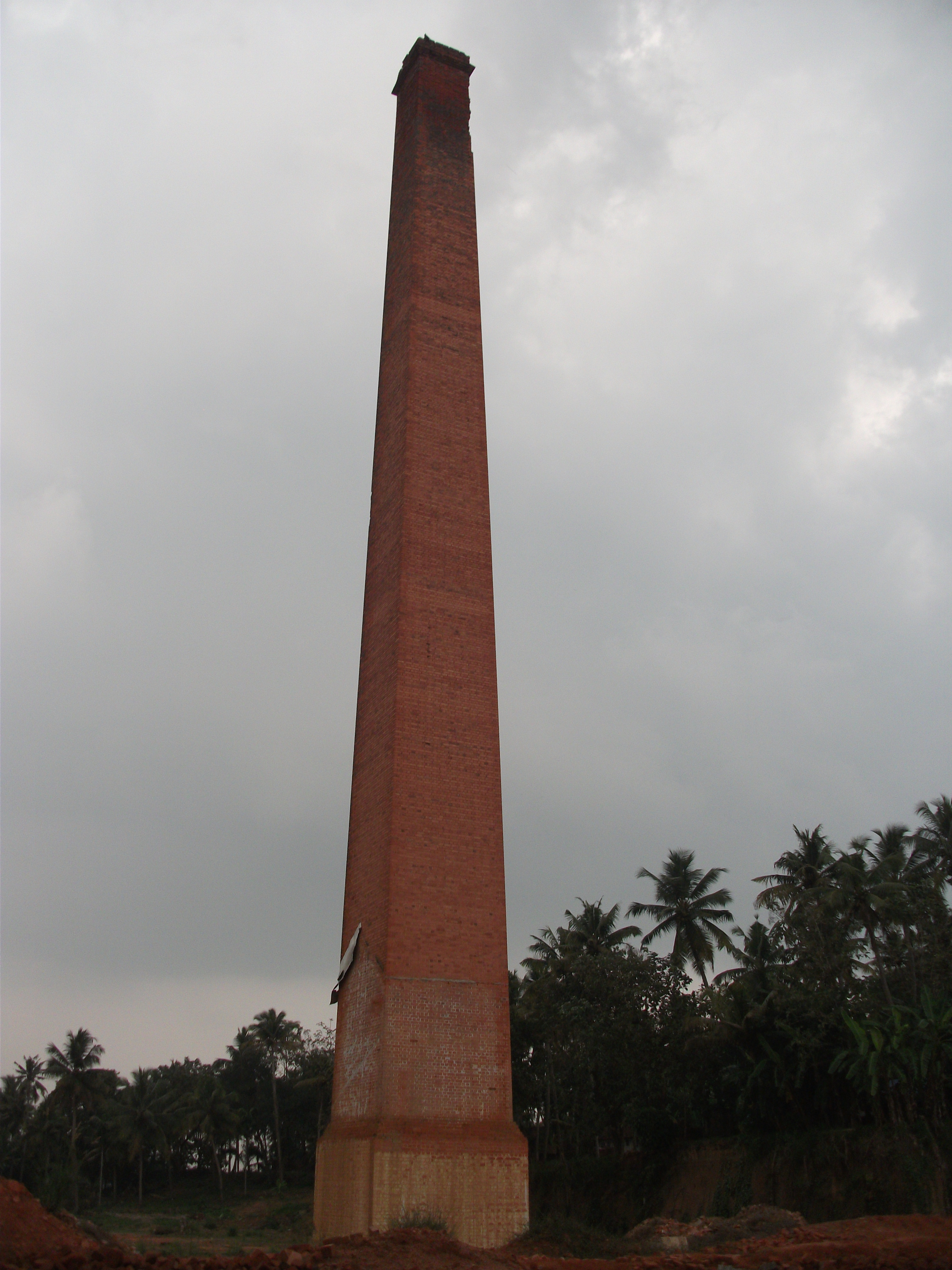
Ruins of chimney, one tile factory in Ithikkara

Ithikkara is a place in Kollam district, Kerala, India, about 12 km from Kollam city. It received its name from Ithikkara River.

The Ithikkara River originates from the low hills situated near Madathuri kunnu at about +240 m above M.S.L and from the hills located south-west of Kulathupuzha. The Vattapparambu stream and the Kunduman thodu are its important tributaries.

The latter joins the Ithikkara at Plakkadu about 200 m upstream of Ithikkara Bridge on N.H.47. The river has a north-westerly course up to the Irattur Malai from where it flows west up to Pampira and then takes a more or less south-westerly course till its exits into the Paravur Kayal near Meenad.

The river passes through the villages of Channapetta, Alayamon, Vayala, Pampira, Ayur, Thiruvambhagam, Atturkonam and Adichanallore. Kottiyam, Chathannoor and Chadayamangalam are some of the important places in the basin.

The river has a length of 56 km and a catchment area of 642 km^{2}. The complete catchment lies within the state.

Ithikkara Block Panchayath – On 1 April 1961, Ithikkara Block Panchayath was established. It has following panchayaths: Poothakkulam, Kalluvathukkal, Chathannoor, Nedumpana, and Adichanallur.

== Location ==
It is on the National Highway 66 between Chathannoor town and Kollam City. There are regular bus services from Kollam City. Nearest major railway station is Kollam Junction. Paravur railway station is 14 km away.

The nearest airport is Thiruvananthapuram International Airport (55 km).

== Industries ==
There were large-scale industries, like tile factories, cashew factories, and clay-modelling. Now few left and many other small-scale industries have opened.

== Nearby institutions and hospitals ==
- Royal Multi Speciality Hospital (500m)
- Holy Cross Hospital, Kottiyam (3 km)
- KIMS Hospital, Sithara Junction Mylakkadu, Kottiyam (2Km)
- TB Hospital (6 km)
- Azeezia Medical College, Meyannor (10 km)
- Travancore Engineering College (9 km)
- MES Institute of Technology & Management (2 km)
- Younus College of Engineering & Technology (8 km)
- Nehru Memorial Higher Secondary School, Kaithakuzhy (2 km)
- KSRTC Bus Station, Chathannoor (3 km)
- The Raviz 5 Star Resort, Thevally, Kollam (15 km). 360 virtual tour
- Pullichira Church, Mayyanadu (5 km)
- Kunambayikulam Temple (8 km)
- Varkala Beach (19 km)
- Paravur Backwaters (9 km)
- Thiru Aarattu Madannada, Ithikkara, Mylakkadu ( 200m)
- Sri Indilayappan Temple, Plakkadu (1 Km)
- Perumalkunnu Mahavishnu Temple, Adhichanalloor ( 2 Km)
