= Pozhikara =

Pozhikkara Pozhikara
- town
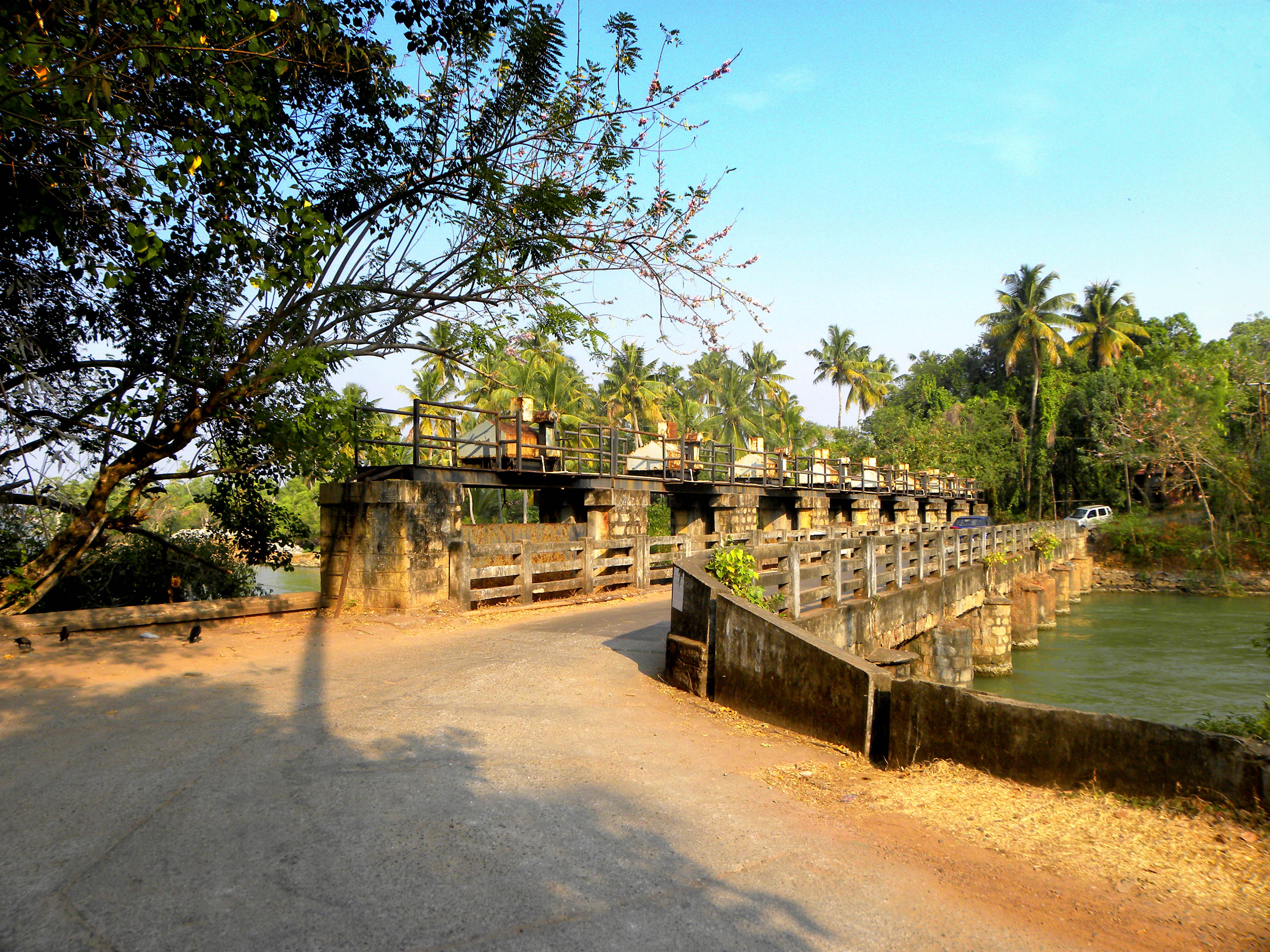
- Pozhikara regulator bridge

- Location in Kerala, India
- Coordinates: 8°48′39″N 76°39′08″E
- Country: India
- State: Kerala
- District: Kollam
- Civic body: Paravur Municipality

Languages
  - Official: Malayalam, English
- Time zone: UTC+5:30 (IST)
- PIN: 691301
- Telephone code: 0474
- Vehicle registration: KL-02
- Nearest city: Kollam - 14 km
- Nearest town: Paravur - 2 km
- Website: www.paravuronline.com www.paravurmunicipality.in//

Pozhikkara or Pozhikara is the Western border town of the Paravur municipality in the Kollam district of Kerala state in India. It is located at the South-Western tip of Kollam's coastal area. It is in the Arabian Sea coast. Pozhikara is a heritage site in Kerala. Visitors, including foreign visitors come to Paravur and Pozhikara to see the estuary, backwaters and beaches. As per the 2018 study report by Central Marine Fisheries Research Institute(CMRFRI) of India, Pozhikkara beach is one of the 16 best-kept beaches in India, topper from the state of Kerala.

== History ==
Pozhikara has an important position in the history of Paravur and Kollam City. Paravur was a trade hub for foreign countries. An ancient document revealing the importance of Paravur and Pozhikara is 'Pozhikara sasanam' built in the 12th century at Pozhikara sivakshetram (later it became a devikshetram). It was encrypted on a 'sila phalakam' in 'vattazhuthu'. Another mention of Paravur is in 'Unnineeli sandesam' which was written above more than 600 years.

Pozhikara was the administrative headquarters of Paravur before the independence of India. Remnants of old fort, Thaana (police station) and Anchalappees (post office) still remain.

== Location ==
Pozhikara is about 12 km from Kollam City through Kollam-Paravur coastal road. Pozhikara is 2.5 km away from Paravur town. KSRTC runs daily bus services in Pozhikara-Ernakulam and Pozhikara-Poovar route. Paravur Municipal bus stand is about 2.5 km away from pozhikara.

The nearest important railway station is Paravur Railway Station, which is 2.5 km away from Pozhikara. The nearest airport is Thiruvananthapuram International Airport.

== See also ==
- Paravur
- Paravur Railway Station
- Nedungolam
- Thekkumbhagam
- Kollam
- Paravur Kayal
- Kollam District
