= Education in Kerala =

Aspect of Indian society

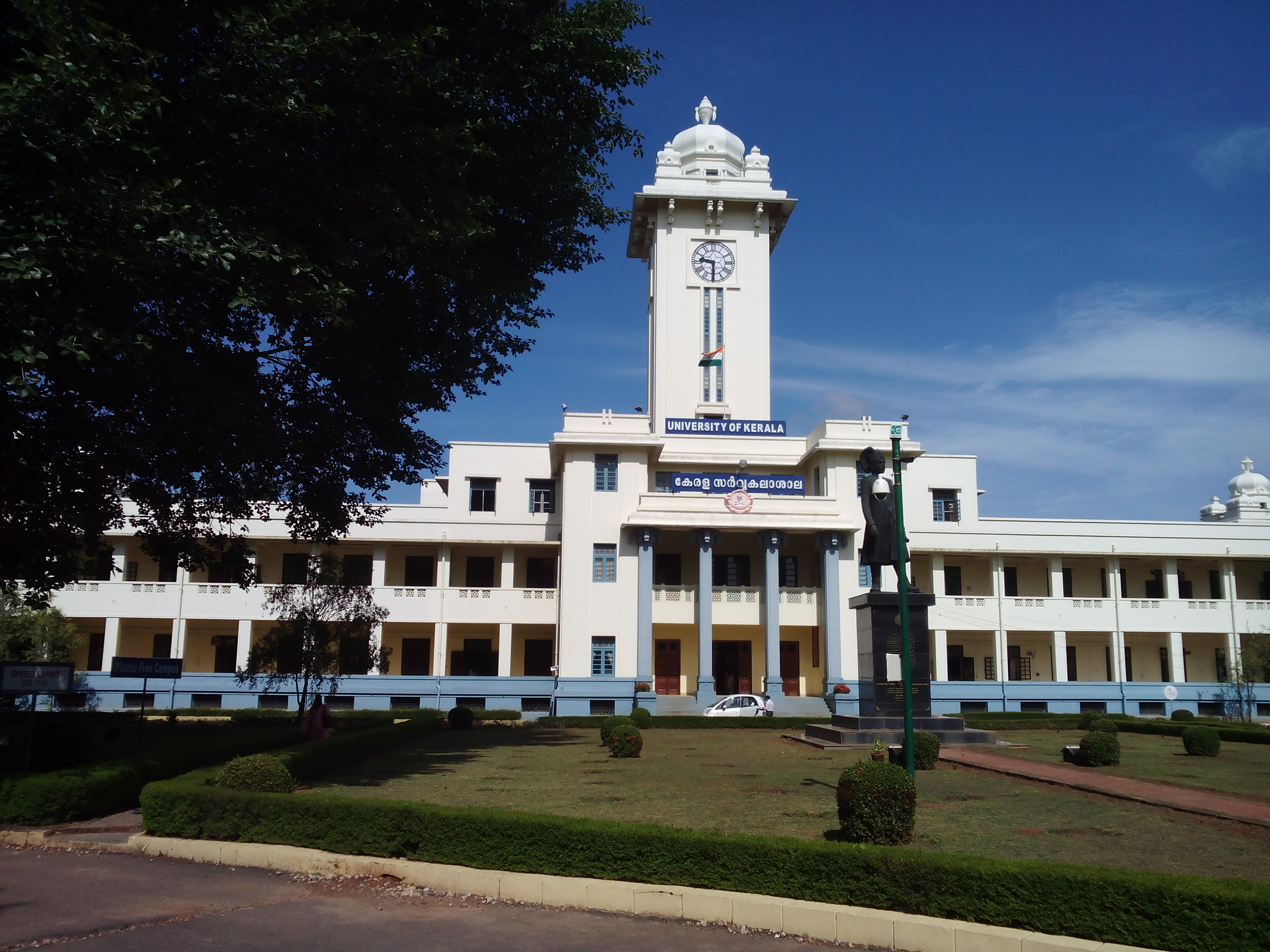
University of Kerala at Thiruvananthapuram

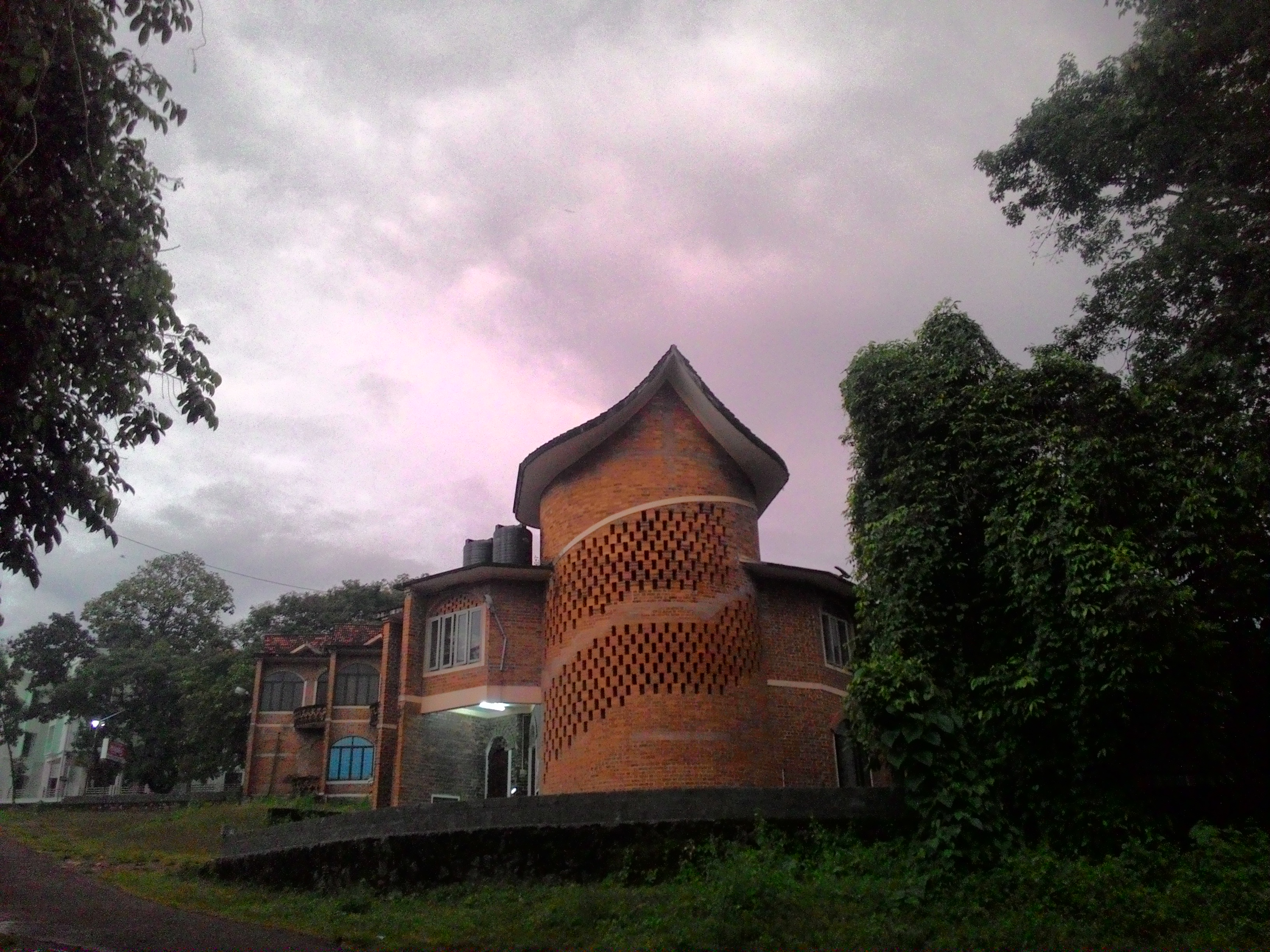
Cochin University of Science and Technology at Kochi

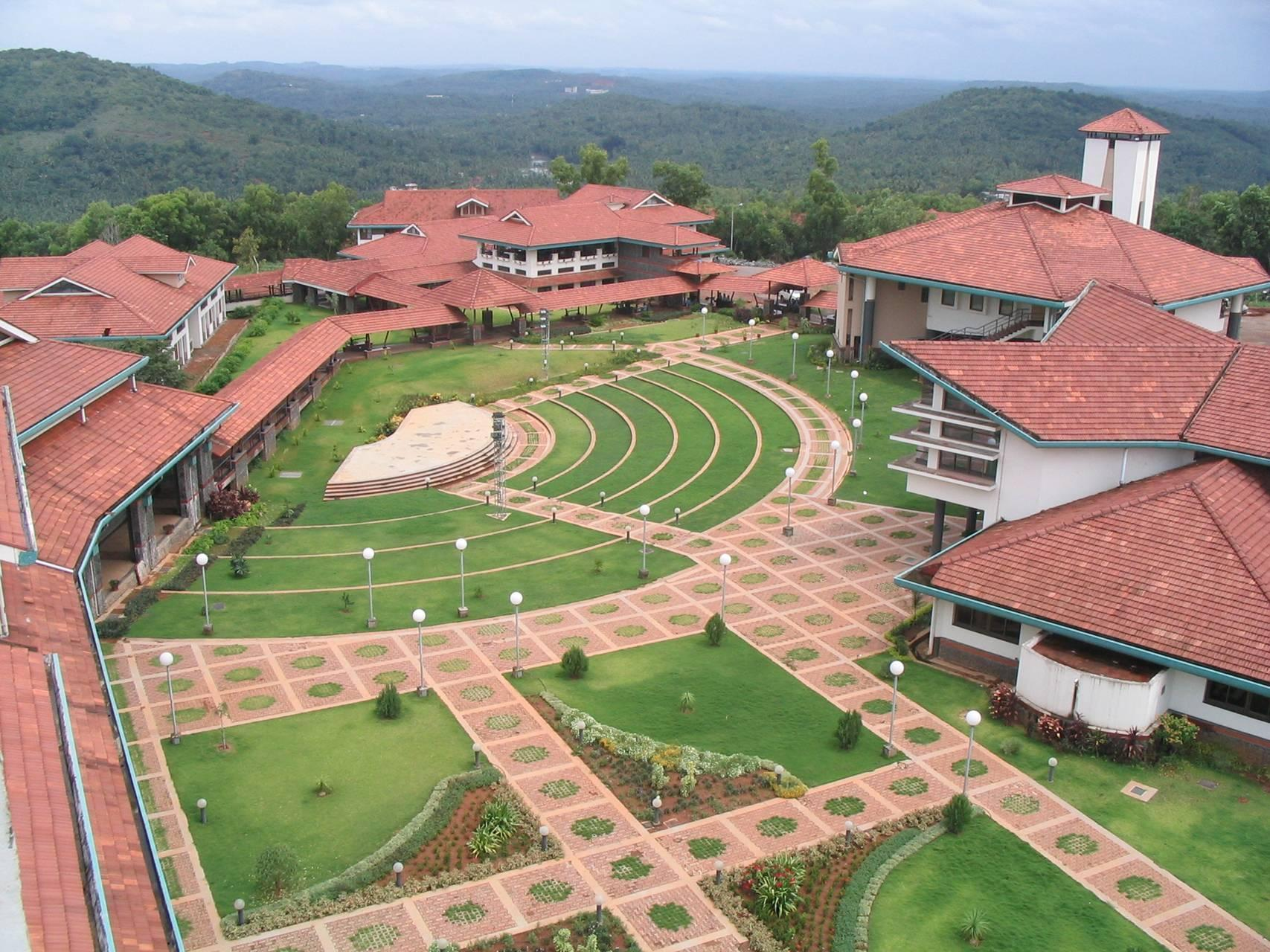
Indian Institute of Management at Kozhikode

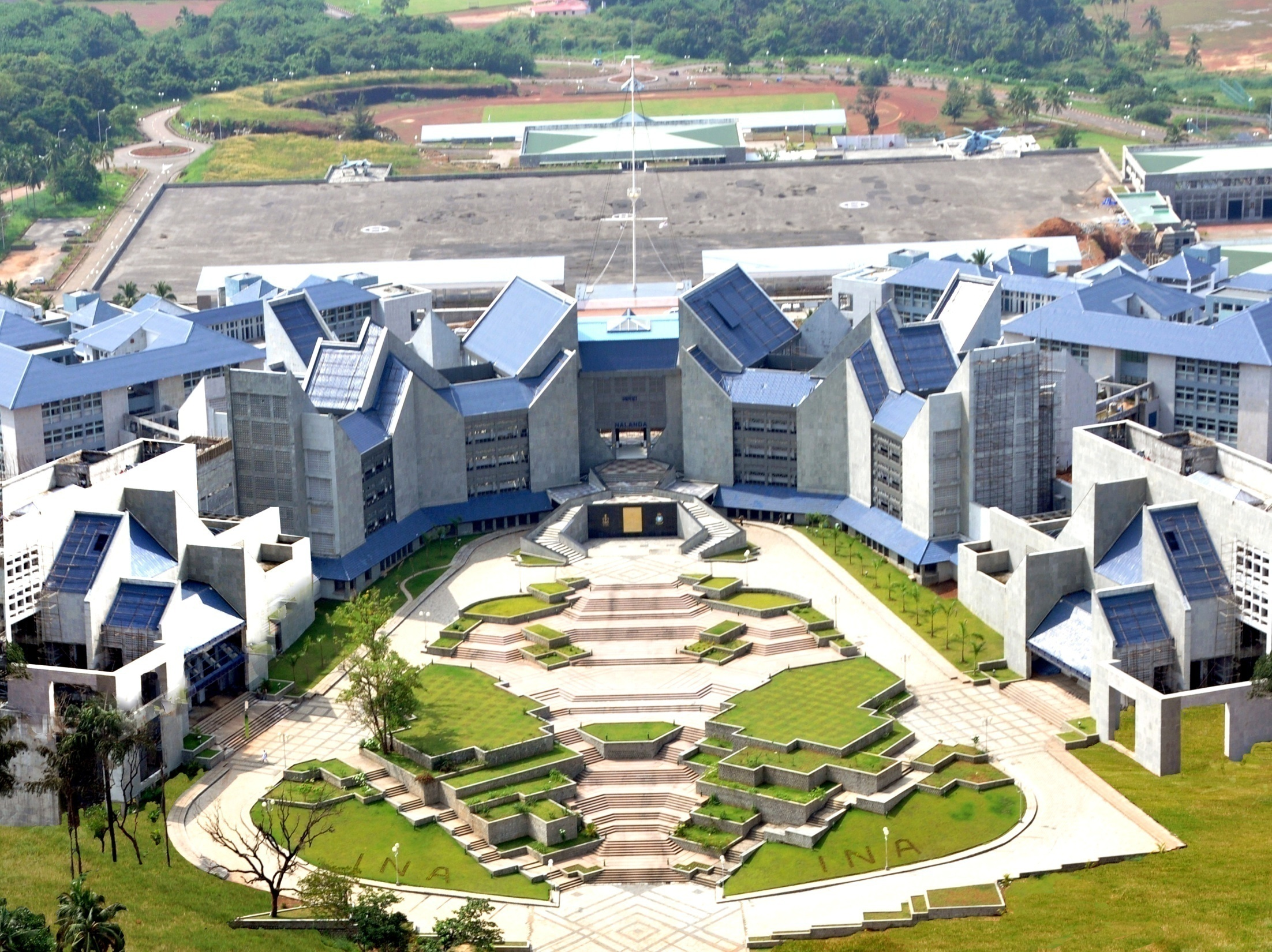
Indian Naval Academy at Kannur

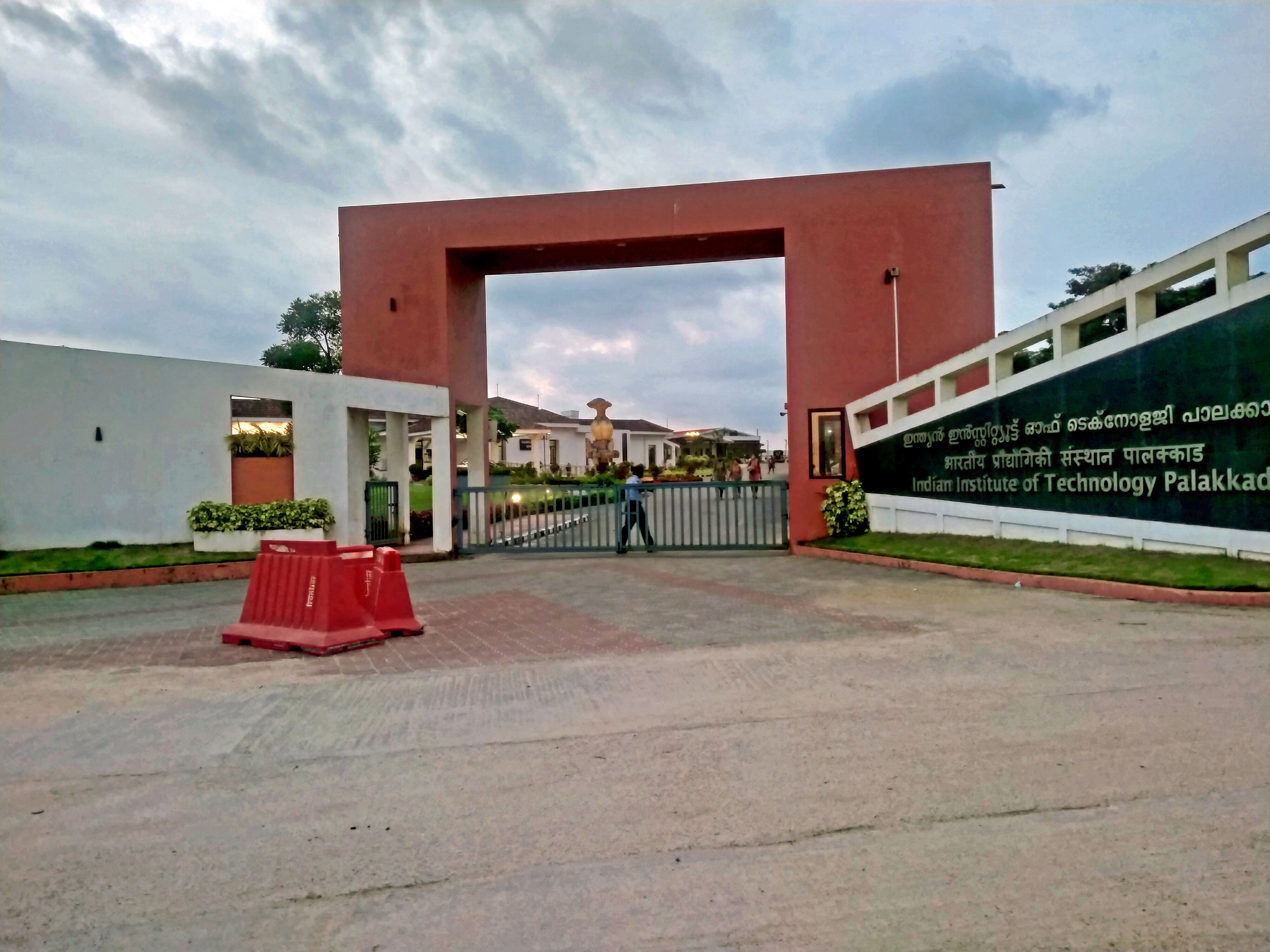
Indian Institute of Technology at Palakkad

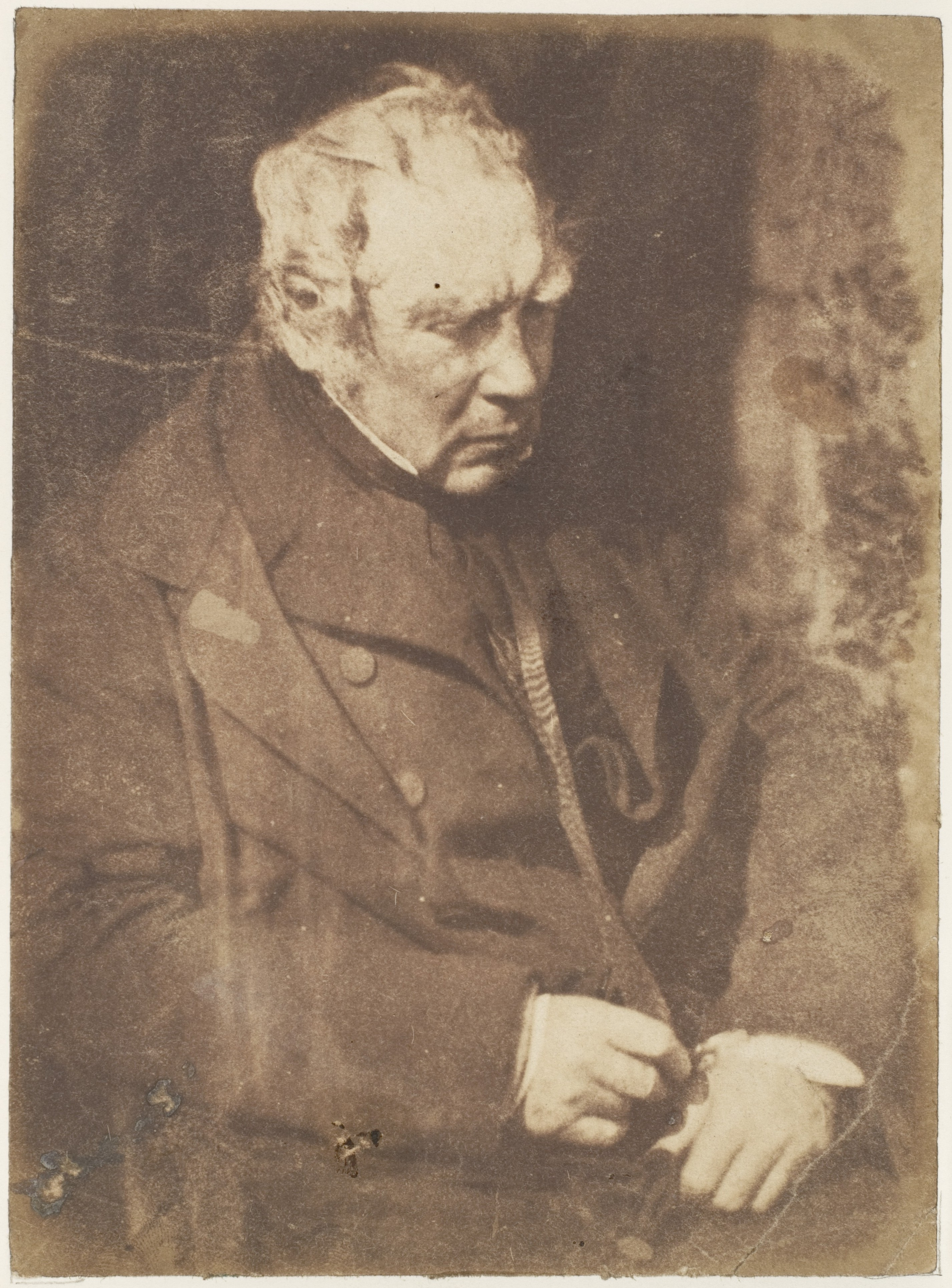
General John Munro, who was Diwan of Travancore, established the first college in India, CMS College Kottayam in 1815.

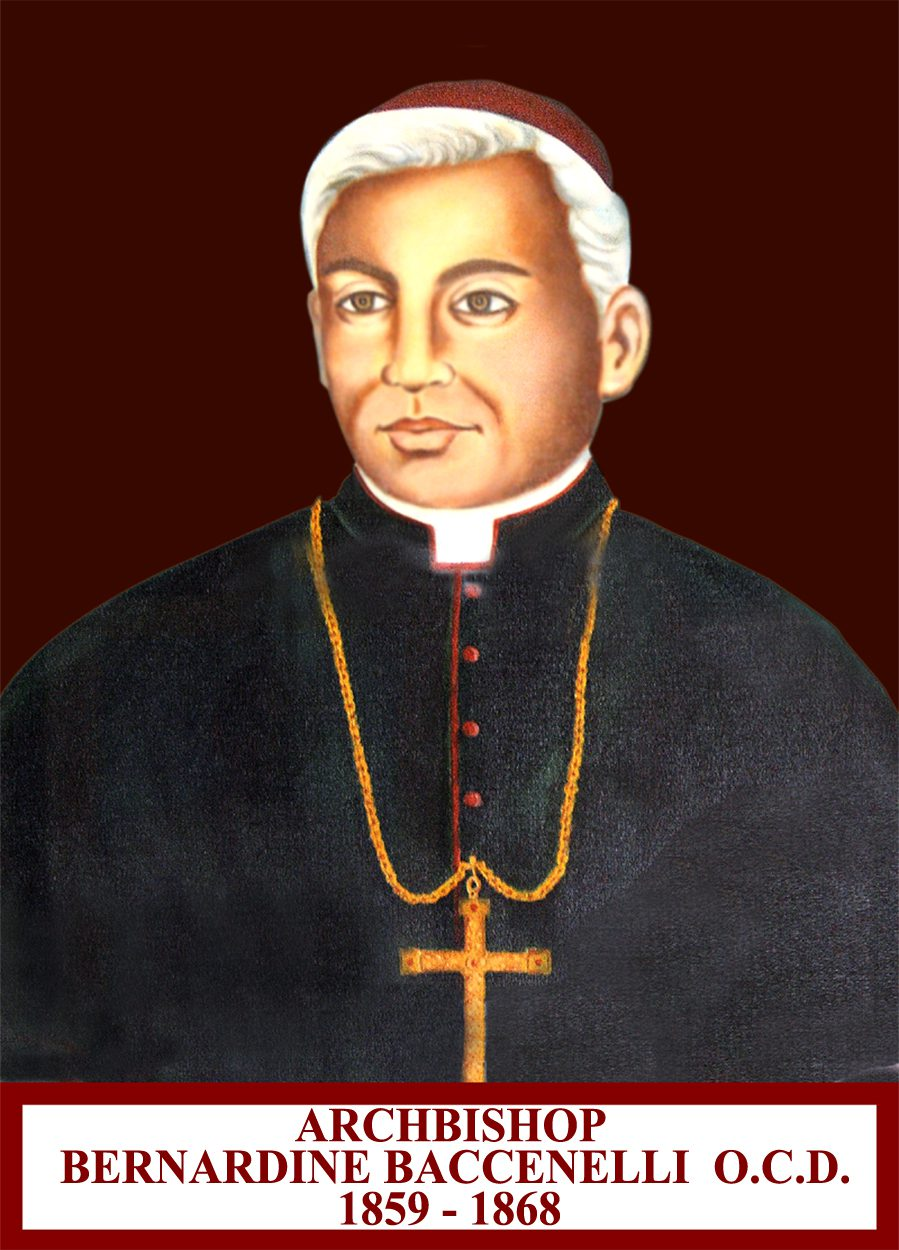
Bernardine Baccinelli who introduced the concept 'Pallikkoppam Pallikkoodam' (“a school in every church courtyard”) which gave admission to all students irrespective of gender, caste, creed etc.

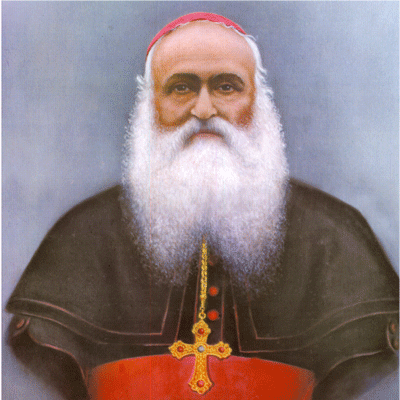
Mar Charles Lavigne, founder of one of the first residential English High Schools in Central Travancore, St Berchmans English High School, Changanasserry in 1891.

The importance and antiquity of education in Kerala are underscored by the state's ranking as among the most literate in the country. The educational transformation of Kerala was triggered by the efforts of missions like the Church Mission Society, British administrators like John Munro, caste and community movements, and clergy of Catholic church like Bernardine Baccinelli and Fr Charles Lavigne. They were the pioneers that promoted mass education in Kerala, in the early decades of the 19th century. The local dynastic precursors of modern-day Kerala, primarily the Travancore Royal Family, the Nair Service Society, Sree Narayana Dharma Paripalana Yogam (SNDP Yogam), and Muslim Educational Society (MES), also made significant contributions to the progress on education in Kerala. Local schools were known by the general term kalaris, some of which taught martial arts, but other village schools run by Ezhuthachans were for imparting general education. Christian missionaries and British rule brought the modern school education system to Kerala. Ezhuthu palli was the name used in earlier times. The word was derived from the schools run by the Buddhist monasteries. For centuries, villages used to set up an ezhuthupally or ashan pallikoodam with one or two teachers. Students used to go this school from nearby areas and learn languages, literature, mathematics, grammar etc. After completing this, students may continue study about specific subjects such as ayurveda, astrology, accounting etc. Censuses during the 1800s showed that Travancore, Cochin, and Kannur areas have many such schools.

== History ==
=== Medieval era ===
The Kerala school of astronomy and mathematics was founded by Madhava of Sangamagrama in Kerala mainly based at Vettathunadu (present-day Tirur region), which included among its members: Parameshvara, Neelakanta Somayaji, Jyeshtadeva, Achyuta Pisharati, Melpathur Narayana Bhattathiri, and Achyuta Panikkar. The school flourished between the 14th and 16th centuries. The original discoveries of the school seems to have ended with Narayana Bhattathiri (1559–1632). In attempting to solve astronomical problems, the Kerala school independently created a number of important mathematics concepts. Their most important results—series expansion for trigonometric functions—were described in Sanskrit verse in a book by Neelakanta called Tantrasangraha, and again in a commentary on this work, called Tantrasangraha-vakhya, of unknown authorship. The theorems were stated without proof, but proofs for the series for sine, cosine, and inverse tangent were provided a century later in the work Yuktibhāṣā (c.1500–1610), written in Malayalam, by Jyesthadeva, and also in a commentary on Tantrasangraha. Their work, completed two centuries before the invention of calculus in Europe, provided what is now considered the first example of a power series (apart from geometric series). However, they did not formulate a systematic theory of differentiation and integration, nor is there any direct evidence of their results being transmitted outside Kerala. Before that, local schools were formed by wealthy families or by teachers known as kudipallikudam where children were taught language/literature, mathematics etc. Tamil and Sanskrit were given special status while Malayalam was not given that respect. Almost all communities had members who were well educated. Artisan/trade/medical communities like Vishwakarma, Ezhava, etc., gave special interest in acquiring education.

=== 1800–1880 ===
==== Basel Mission ====
In the 19th century, Kerala underwent transformative changes in its educational landscape, driven largely by missionary activities. The Basel German Evangelical Mission played a pivotal role by establishing schools across the Malabar region. In 1818, the British missionary Rev. J. Dawson initiated the establishment of an English School in Mattancherry with financial aid from the Cochin Government. Dr. Hermann Gundert, associated with the Basel Mission, significantly contributed to Malayalam language and literature by compiling the first Malayalam grammar book, Malayalabhaasha Vyakaranam, and preparing the initial Malayalam-English dictionary in 1872. The Basel Mission, under W.T. Ringletaube, made strides in education, setting up schools in Nagercoil and nearby areas between 1806 and 1816. In 1824, Basel Mission was running 56 while CMS managed 47 schools. By the end of the century, the schools increased to 257 and 351 respectively.

Hermann Gundert associated with the Basel Mission, played a pivotal role in the 19th-century educational landscape of Kerala. In February 1846, Gundert opened a lithographic press and bookbinding establishment at Nettur near Tellicherry, contributing significantly to the development of education in Malabar. The Basel Mission's printing press published the Malayalam fortnightly magazine Keralopakari in May 1874, covering world news, weather reports, and agricultural news. Gundert's efforts in introducing sophisticated printing technology and publishing textbooks were instrumental in boosting education in the region. His contribution to Malayalam language and literature remains a lasting legacy in Kerala's educational history.

==== Church Missionary Society and London Missionary Society ====
The 19th-century educational landscape of Kerala was profoundly shaped by the Church Missionary Society (CMS) and the London Missionary Society (LMS). Rev. Mead of LMS, active from 1817 to 1873, played a crucial role by initiating vocational schools in southern Thiruvithamkur. In 1816, Thomas Dawson, the first CMS missionary, opened a school in Mattancherry. CMS missionaries, including Thomas Norton and Henry Baker, were instrumental in promoting education for oppressed and lower castes, establishing schools in Mavelikkara, Tiruvalla, Mallapalli, Mundakkayam, and Melukavu. Dorothea Baker, wife of Rev. Henry Baker from CMS, launched the first girls' school, Baker Memorial Girls’ School in Kottayam in 1819, marking a historic milestone in female education. CMS's emphasis on education brought about a radical change in the social structure of Kerala, challenging traditional norms. The split between the Syrian church and CMS in 1835–40 led to the founding of the Marthoma Church, which independently established numerous English schools.

==== Catholic Church ====
A significant figure in the 19th century was Bernardine Baccinelli, who started a system called "A school along with every church" to make education available for both poor and rich. That system still continues in the present. His work has resulted in the promotion of education for girls. Mother Eliswa, a widow turned nun, started first convent school and boarding school for girls in Kerala.

=== 1880–1947 ===
==== Travancore rulers ====
Under reign of the Travancore rulers, Maharaja Visakham Thirunal Rama Varma (1880–1885) and Maharaja MoolamThirunal Rama Varma (1885–1924), Kerala experienced a surge in educational advancements. The rulers implemented grants-in-aid to extend elementary education, categorized schools from primary to specialized colleges, and introduced free primary education for backward classes. Maharaja Moolam Thirunal Rama Varma's reign saw the establishment of various educational institutions, including the Victoria Medical School, a Normal School for girls, and the Sanskrit College. Reformatory schools for juvenile offenders were established, and technical education was encouraged with the institution of scholarships for studies in European countries.

==== Major leaders ====
Christian organizations played a significant role in channeling substantial investments into educational institutions during this era. However, these endeavors resulted in tensions with other communities in terms of accessibility, impeding the monopoly on education. However, such conflicts made other religious organizations to reconsider their involvement in the education sector. Prominent among these entities were Nair Service Samajam (NSS), Sree Narayana Dharma Paripalana Yogam (SNDP Yogam), and the Muslim Education Society (MES). The level of government support for these organizations fluctuated over time, reflecting a noteworthy evolution in the government's perspective on these developments over the years. The establishment of Karukachal English School in 1915 marked entry of NSS into the field of education. The major leaders in the education field at that time were Catholic churches, Nair Service Society, SNDP Yogam, Sadhu Jana Paripalana Sabha, Muslim Education Society (MES), and a few individuals.

=== Post-Independence era ===
The Kerala Education Act of 1958 provided for the better organization and development of educational institutions. According to the first economic census, conducted in 1977, 99.7% of the villages in Kerala had a primary school within 2 kilometres (1.2 mi), 98.6% had a middle school within 2 kilometres (1.2 mi) and 96.7% had a high school or higher secondary school within 5 kilometres (3.1 mi). In 1991, Kerala became the first state in India to be recognized as completely literate, although the effective literacy rate at that time was only 90%.

=== Present ===
Schools and colleges are mostly run by the government, private trusts, or individuals. Each school is affiliated with either the Kerala Board of Public Examination (KBPE), the Central Board for Secondary Education (CBSE), Indian Certificate of Secondary Education (ICSE), or the (NIOS). English is the language of instruction in most private schools, while government run schools offer English or Malayalam as the medium of instruction. Government-run schools in the districts bordering Karnataka and Tamil Nadu also offer instruction in Kannada or Tamil languages. A handful of Government Sanskrit Schools provide instruction in Sanskrit supplemented by Malayalam, English, Tamil or Kannada. After 10 years of secondary schooling, students typically enroll at Higher Secondary School in one of the three streams—liberal arts, commerce or science. Upon completing the required coursework, students can enroll in general or professional degree programmes. Kerala topped the Education Development Index (EDI) among 21 major states in India in year 2006–2007. In January 2016, Kerala became the 1st Indian state to achieve 100% primary education through its literacy programme Athulyam. Around 18% of the total employees in the organized sector of state, both public and private, are employed in the Educational sector as in March 2020. Kerala is also one of the Indian states which spend a larger proportion of its revenue for human resource development including educational and healthcare uplifting. Kerala is mostly literate

In 2006–2007, the state topped the Education Development Index (EDI) of the 21 major states in India. As of 2007, enrolment in elementary education was almost 100%; and, unlike other states in India, educational opportunity was almost equally distributed among sexes, social groups, and regions. According to the 2011 census, Kerala has a 93.9% literacy, compared to the national literacy rate of 74.0%.

In January 2016, Kerala became the first Indian state to achieve 100% primary education through its Athulyam literacy programme. Though the cost of education is generally considered low in Kerala, according to the 61st round of the National Sample Survey (2004–2005), per capita spending on education by the rural households was reported to be ₹41 (43¢ US) for Kerala, more than twice the national average. The survey also revealed that the rural-urban difference in household expenditure on education was much less in Kerala than in the rest of India.

== Structure and educational authority ==
The schools and colleges in Kerala are run by the government or private trusts and individuals. English is the language of instruction in most private schools, but government-run schools offer both English and Malayalam as medium. After 10 years of secondary schooling, students typically enroll at Higher Secondary School in one of the three streams—humanities, commerce or science. Upon completing the required coursework, students can enroll in general or professional degree programs. There are also a lot of private educational and training institutes, career colleges, etc. that run with and without regulation of an authorizing body, and many with authorizing body names that sound similar to a government related accrediting body like "Rural Allied Healthcare Skill Council Of India" or of reputable universities to deceive students into believing programs run by them are accredited and recognized. Major differentiating characteristic of these programs are that they are not recognized for further academic pursuits. Many programs that are provided through parallel accrediting bodies like Bharat Sevak Samaj (BSS), National Skill Development Corporation (NSDC), Kerala Academy for Skills Excellence (KASE), Kerala State RUTRONIX, etc. are not run with the required integrity, and hence courses taken through such programs are not transferrable.

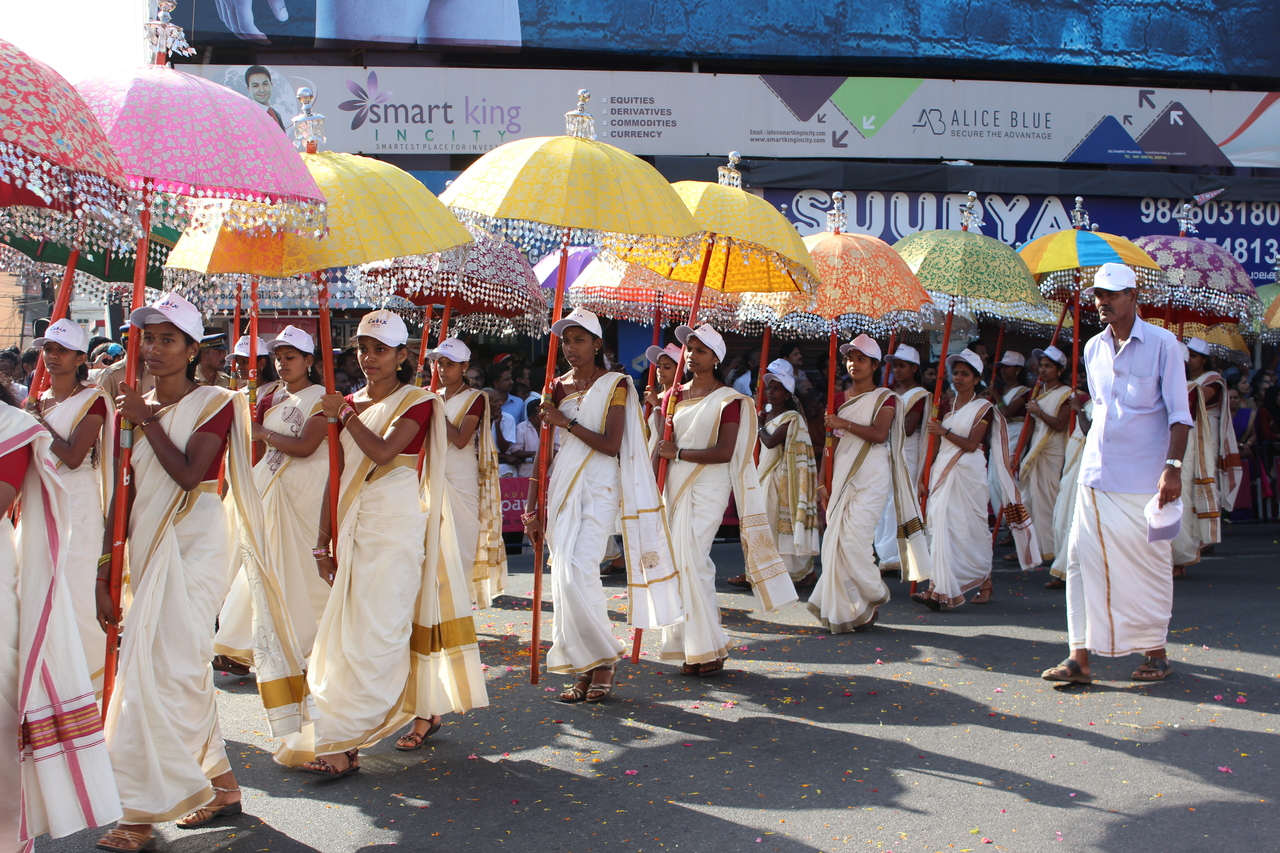
School Arts Festival in Palakkad

=== General education ===
School education in the state falls under the purview of the General Education Department. It comprises Pre-primary (LKG and UKG), Lower Primary (Classes 1–4), Upper Primary (Classes 5–7), High School (Classes 8–10), and Higher Secondary (Classes 11–12) levels. The Minister of General Education, who is a member of the state legislature, is in overall charge of school education in the state. The General Education Department, Government of Kerala is responsible for administrative and policy matters related to school education, literacy, teacher training, and educational research in Kerala. The allied institutions under the department serve as its implementing and operational arms, carrying out policies and programmes formulated by the government. The majority of public schools in Kerala are affiliated with the State Council of Educational Research and Training, Kerala (SCERT Kerala). As of recent data, there are 15,892 schools affiliated with SCERT, of which 5,986 are government schools, 8,183 are aided schools, and the remainder are unaided or technical institutions. Each school in the state is affiliated with either SCERT Kerala, the Central Board of Secondary Education (CBSE), the Council for the Indian School Certificate Examinations (CISCE), or the National Institute of Open Schooling (NIOS), while a few schools also offer the Cambridge International General Certificate of Secondary Education (IGCSE) curriculum. The following Directorates implement those education aspects which are under the control of the General Education Department.

- Directorate of General Education
- State Council for Open and Lifelong Education (SCOLE Kerala)
- State Council of Educational Research and Training (SCERT)
- Kerala State Literacy Mission Authority (KSLMA)
- Kerala Infrastructure and Technology for Education (KITE) (IT@School)

=== Higher education ===
The Minister of Higher Education, who is a member of state legislator, is in overall charge of higher education in the state. The Higher Education Department is the administrative department responsible for higher education, university education, and collegiate education in the state. The following institutions and departments implement those policies.

- Directorate of Collegiate Education
- Directorate of Technical Education

=== Medical education ===
The Kerala Medical Council (KMC) is responsible for regulating and overseeing medical education in the state. It sets the guidelines and standards for medical colleges, courses, and examinations. The Directorate of Medical Education (DME) is a government body responsible for overseeing medical education in the state of Kerala, India. The DME functions under the Department of Health and Family Welfare, Government of Kerala. The primary responsibility of the Directorate of Medical Education is to regulate and supervise the functioning of medical colleges, dental colleges, nursing schools, and other allied health institutions in Kerala. Some of the renowned medical colleges in Kerala include Government Medical College, Thiruvananthapuram; Calicut Medical College, Kozhikode; Government Medical College, Manjeri; Government Medical College, Pathanamthitta, among others.

- Kerala University of Health Sciences (KUHS)

==== Homeopathy, ayurveda, etc ====
- Directorate of Homeopathy, under AYUSH Department

=== Fisheries ===
Kerala has a dedicated fishery university known as Kerala University of Fisheries and Ocean Studies (KUFOS). Established in 2010, KUFOS is the first fishery university in India. It offers undergraduate, postgraduate, and doctoral programs in fisheries science, aquaculture, fishery biology, fishing technology, and related disciplines. The Department of Fisheries is in overall charge of fishery education in the state.

=== Veterinary ===
The Department of Animal Husbandry and Dairy Development, is in overall charge of development and administration of fisheries institutions in the state. Kerala Veterinary and Animal Sciences University (KVASU) is a state university dedicated to veterinary and animal sciences. It is headquartered in Pookode, Wayanad.

== School education in Kerala ==
There are many government agencies which support the quality of school education in Kerala. The Directorate of General Education is the topmost administrative wing of School Education. The other agencies are SCERT (State Council for Educational Research and Training), SSK (Samagra Shiksha Kerala), Kite, SIEMAT (State Institute for Educational management and Training), and SIET (State Institute for Educational Technology). The KITE Kerala is a state owned special purpose company under education department of the Government of Kerala. It was developed to support ICT enabled education for schools in the state. The erstwhile IT@School Project was transformed into KITE for extending its scope of operations in August 2017. Kerala is the first Indian state to have ICT-enabled education with hi-tech classrooms in all public schools. Kerala was rated highly in the School Education Quality Index published by NITI Aayog in 2019.

Schools in Kerala 2019–20
1. Govt. (36.7%)
2. Govt. Aided (53.6%)
3. Unaided Private (9.70%)

No. of Schools in Kerala 2019–20
Category	Govt.	Govt. Aided	Unaided Private
Lower Primary (LP)	2595	3911	342
Upper Primary (UP)	870	1873	242
Secondary (HS)	1228	1432	458
Higher Secondary (HSS)^{*}	817	846	412
Total	5510	8062	1454
^{*} from statistics 2018–2019

According to a 1999 study by the Centre for Socio-economic & Environmental Studies, dropout rates in primary schools were significantly low. However, the study found that dropout rates increased notably in the ninth and tenth grades in Kerala. This was particularly true of SC/ST students. Schools showed that only 73% of the students joining at 1st Standard reach the 10th Standard. In the case of scheduled caste students, only 59% reached the 10th standard. 60% of Scheduled Tribe students drop out by the 10th standard. In March 2011, 91.37% students qualified for higher studies in the matriculation Examination. The grades in SSLC examination plays an important role in the admission procedure to colleges in Kerala.

In Kerala, school education is divided into three stages, viz.,

=== Primary education ===
- Lower Primary (LP) (Classes 1–4)
- Upper Primary (UP) (Classes 5–7)

=== Secondary education or high school ===
- Secondary (HS) (Classes 8–10)

=== Higher secondary education ===
- Higher Secondary (HSS) (Classes XI–XII) (+1 & +2)

=== Vocational higher secondary education (VHSE) ===
VHSE offers job-oriented courses to students at the higher secondary level (11th and 12th grades) and aims to provide them with practical skills and training for employment. The VHSE courses are designed to equip students with specific vocational skills in various fields such as agriculture, commerce, engineering, health sciences, humanities, and technology. These courses are intended to prepare students for immediate employment after completing their higher secondary education.

== Higher education in Kerala ==
The Higher Education Department of the Government is responsible for the overall governance and development of higher education in the state. It formulates policies, plans, and implements programs related to higher education.

=== Specialized institutions ===
Specialized institutions of higher education specializes in fields such as engineering, medicine, agriculture, architecture, and pharmacy. Some notable institutions in this category include the Indian Institute of Management (IIM) Kozhikode, National Institute of Technology (NIT) Calicut, All India Institute of Medical Sciences (AIIMS) Mangalapuram, and College of Engineering, Trivandrum.

=== Universities ===
Kerala has several universities that offer undergraduate, postgraduate, and doctoral programs across various disciplines. Some of the prominent universities in the state include:

- University of Kerala: Established in 1937, it is one of the oldest universities in Kerala, offering a wide range of programs in arts, science, commerce, law, engineering, and more.
- Mahatma Gandhi University: Located in Kottayam, this university offers programs in arts, science, commerce, management, law, social sciences, and applied sciences.
- Calicut University: Situated in Malappuram, it offers programs in humanities, science, technology, commerce, management, and health sciences.
- Cochin University of Science and Technology: Known as CUSAT, is a specialized university offering programs in science, technology, engineering, and management.
- Kannur University:
- Sree Sankaracharya University of Sanskrit:
- APJ Abdul Kalam Technological University:

=== Government and private colleges ===
Kerala has numerous government and private colleges affiliated with universities. College level education started in the 1860s, however the first university was established in 1937. These colleges offer undergraduate and postgraduate courses in arts, science, commerce, engineering, medicine, law, management, and other disciplines.

=== Autonomous colleges ===
There are several autonomous colleges in Kerala that have the freedom to design their own curriculum, conduct examinations, and award degrees. These colleges often have a reputation for academic excellence and offer a variety of courses.

=== Polytechnic colleges ===
Kerala has a network of polytechnic colleges that offer diploma and certificate courses in engineering, technology, and allied disciplines. These colleges focus on practical and technical education.

=== Student immigration and brain drain ===
From the mid-2000s onward, there has been a trend of students migrating from Kerala to other states due to a lack of accessibility and quality of education. Since the mid-2010s, a trend of students migrating from Kerala to other countries for studies with the aim of permanent immigration has been observed. This trend began to change in 2020, as students who complete their Plus Two or school education started migrating for studies. This shift is found to be driven by the lack of international recognition of Kerala's higher educational qualifications as equivalent and the limited availability of quality job opportunities within Kerala. This has become prevalent due to the deteriorating social and polieconomical state of the country, lack of opportunity to make sustainable living, lack of state's ability to be inclusive of needs of families and individuals of all socioeconomic status, and ability to innovate and capture trends of modern higher education that meets its populations needs. Additionally, the rise of unregulated and predatory study abroad agencies that have mushroomed in every major town's and cities offering qualitative and competent benefits that are often untrue exacerbates the situation.

In 2024, it was estimated that students from Kerala had migrated to 54 countries. Experts opine that while in the past, migration of individuals in their adulthood was due to economic distress, resulting in inbound money transfers. Now, it has become migration of young adults (18 to 24 years old) as students due to socioeconomic distress and cultural factors, resulting in outbound transfers of funds and drainage of wealth. For more than half a century, educated nurses and IT professionals were the regular sources of immigrants. However, the changes in demand for skilled workers in this sector have altered the situation. Nurses with just one year of experience can now permanently migrate to foreign countries. Similarly, computer science engineers are drawn to the workforce requirements of expanding contract companies in other states, as well as the lifestyle opportunities available in such areas. Those who are unable to achieve these milestones are opting to study abroad to re-educate in their fields, improve their chances, and to avoid in an extend of being in the growing opo sedae generation in Kerala. In 2019, it was estimated that around 30,000 Keralite students annually migrated from India alone for higher education. In 2023, one study abroad agency, among many others, was solely able to facilitate the migration of more than 7,000 students from Kerala in one international intake session.

The number of Keralites immigrating to foreign countries is also significant. Studies have found that most of the students are not migrating for quality education, they are choosing education from parallel colleges and state-accredited colleges in these foreign countries with the purpose of permanently immigrating there. Kerala is planning to bring changes in higher education to attract and retain students who pass higher secondary schools and immigrate as it has a deleterious effect on the income of the state's educational institutions and achieving national growth. Among these changes, the state plans to primarily relax its entry baseline for programs to 50% and the required minimum passing percentage from programs to 60%, ensuring that everyone is considered and given chances to achieve a better life through education. These adjustments aim to realign social design patterns and address counterproductive systems by aligning with the humanistic and self-expanding values of Keralites through meaningful nudges. They also plan to remove traditional cross-entry restrictions to higher education programs, enabling students to capture job sectors they can, and to restructure and match their program curriculum's and evaluation processes to popular study-abroad locations for increasing both opportunity and student caliber by international standards. Additionally, they aim to create internationally standardized (i.e., equating credits or credit hours and syllabi) accelerated bachelor's programs and short master's programs in professional education sectors to attract foreign investors looking for availability of quality manpower, develop industry-related, and modern programs with modern educational delivery structures for widening student population (K-Reap), and to regulate predatory study-abroad agencies and their advertisements. Kerala also aims to create emerging programs that can attract students to stay and pursue studies and find qualitative careers in Kerala, institute work-integrated learning (WIL) opportunities through memorandums of understanding (MOUs) with credible organizations, reduce class sizes, increase student well-being comforts, and services, and provide training to professors to increase competency in delivering educational services. The government stated that the overall objective of these changes is to improve citizens' potential for better lifetime earnings and to provide realistic agency in a globalized labor market, benefiting both individuals and the nation as a whole.

=== Shortcomings and other challenges ===
Kerala's higher education system grapples with numerous challenges, especially when compared internationally. There are significant shortcomings within the educational framework, where courses are diluted and often structured in an ambiguous manner, impeding students' ability to grasp and engage with the subject matter. Teaching is often substandard, with professors resorting to fear tactics to discourage students from seeking assistance, thereby masking their own inadequacies and gaining recognition or respect through negative reputation.

The courses offered in Kerala universities fall short in comparison to their international counterparts, placing students at a disadvantage. While international students delve deeply into course content, covering up to 14 chapters or modules in just 4 months, their counterparts in Kerala are limited to 5 to 6 modules, stretched over 6 months, resulting in lesser depth of knowledge. Textbooks relied upon by international institutes feature standardised and well-researched topics relevant to the rapidly-changing pace of the globalised world. Publishers recognised by international academia provide students with online learning websites, which professors can use to track student progress and as assessment tools. They teaching aids and review classes to enhance the student learning experience and empower the teaching staff. In contrast, textbooks prescribed and available in Kerala lack international recognition and are of inferior quality compared to those used in international universities, lacking details, conceptual connections, and grammatical correctness. For instance, mathematics-related textbooks available in Kerala for higher education often lack explanatory content for equations and solutions, with portions of solutions missing, and are generally presented in a listed manner. This type of disjointed format intimidates students and discourages engagement, and presents challenges for educators. Additionally, textbooks in Kerala often use convoluted language instead of Plain English, hindering comprehension and failing to accommodate students with varying levels of English proficiency.

Another issue is the lack of rigour within Kerala's educational system, where students are not required to attain an internationally accepted minimum percentage to progress to advanced courses. In contrast, international universities and colleges demand a minimum of 60 to 72 percent in each course to advance, resulting in better student proficiency. Students in Kerala are subjected to competitive marking processes by professors, resulting in discriminatory oppression and obstructing opportunities for students and their families to improve their lives through investment in academic pursuits. The perpetuation of this counterproductive systemic attribute that sows and reaps inequality in Kerala has led to reduced accessibility to educational programs, even when there is no genuine social or economic pressure for instituting such limitations geographically. Despite living in an era where digital delivery of education is possible, higher education systems in Kerala have failed to embrace this opportunity to implement changes that would make education accessible to the masses. Overall, this predicament, among other significant factors, has significantly contributed to students migrating for higher education to neighboring states and countries that are rooted in socialist and liberalistic principles in matters of education. Many international institutions are accommodating towards students with lower passing percentages in their previous academic pursuits, offering readiness or prerequisite courses that ensure their success in continuing education. This inclusivity extends to international students as well, such as for students from Kerala who may have lower marks or a history of multiple subject failures during their education in Kerala or India. Such arrangements are designed to provide opportunities for students to excel academically and achieve a better quality of life through education, a support system that is not present in Kerala.

At international universities and colleges, students have the opportunity to transition into new career fields through conversion certificates, which typically cover 6 to 8 core subjects. These certificates allow individuals to pursue certain bachelor's and master's degrees in fields unrelated to their previous education. It depends on which degree is essential or considered possible in a standalone manner for practicing in the new field. For instance, a person with a bachelor's degree in English can obtain a conversion certificate for nursing, comprising 6 to 8 courses, and use it to complete a bachelor's degree in nursing in two years, as a bachelor's degree is essential for practicing as a registered Nurse. Similarly, individuals interested in medical radiation and imaging technology can pursue related bachelor programs within 2 years. When considering Master's programs, individuals with any bachelor's degree can pursue integrated master's programs with a clinical focus, such as PharmD in 3 to 4 years, with a conversion certificate containing 6 to 8 essential courses from the bachelor's program in pharmacy. These options are not only available in medical fields but also in various science-related programs. For example, someone with a bachelor's degree in English can obtain a conversion certificate for psychology, covering 4 to 6 courses from the Bachelor program in Psychology, and use it to pursue a 2-year Master in Clinical Psychology. The courses in the conversion certificate would typically be the prerequisite knowledge for being successful in the Master program, and it would be universally the same courses. Similarly, to pursue a 2-year Master in Computer Science, individuals with a bachelor's degree in any field can obtain a conversion certificate covering 4 to 6 essential courses from the Bachelor program in Computer Science. However, such a flexible system empowering students is not present in Kerala.

Political activities within Kerala colleges frequently disrupt education, leading to violence, intimidation, and sometimes fatalities. In international universities, political activities serve as opportunities for building teamwork and governance skills, focusing on advocacy causes rather than representing national parties or ideologies. Additionally, instances of sexual misconduct and harassment in Kerala institutions often go unpunished, with victims silenced, while international institutions swiftly dismiss perpetrators and provide health support for victims.

Furthermore, discrimination based on socioeconomic status, religion, and skin colour remains prevalent in Kerala's higher education institutions, magnified by the absence of protective guidelines or measures, and social education and ethical consciousness about those topics. Consequently, many students are discouraged from pursuing higher education in Kerala due to the growing and unaddressed soft infrastructure problems and perpetuation of inequalities within the state's higher education landscape.

== Higher education by region ==
=== Thiruvananthapuram ===
Thiruvananthapuram, the state's major academic hub, University of Kerala and several professional education colleges, including 15 engineering colleges, three medical colleges, three ayurveda colleges, two colleges of homeopathy, six other medical colleges, and several law colleges. Trivandrum Medical College, Kerala's premier health institute, one of the finest in the country, is being upgraded to the status of an All India Institute of Medical Sciences (AIIMS). The College of Engineering, Trivandrum, is one of the prominent engineering institutions in the state. The Asian School of Business and IIITM-K are two of the other premier management study institutions in the city, both situated inside Technopark. The Indian Institute of Space Science and Technology, first of its kind in India, is also situated here and an Indian Institute of Science Education and Research, Thiruvananthapuram is also being set up. Trivandrum district holds the most number of colleges and schools in Kerala including 4 international schools, 30 professional colleges, and 38 vocational training institutes.

Thiruvananthapuram is also home to most number of Research Centres in Kerala including ISRO, IISER, BrahMos Aerospace Private Limited, Vikram Sarabhai Space Centre (VSSC), Centre for Development Studies (CDS), Liquid Propulsion Systems Centre (LPSC), Thumba Equatorial Rocket Launching Station (TERLS) etc. The Asian School of Business and IIITM-K are two of the other premier management study institutions in the city, both situated inside Technopark. The Indian Institute of Space Technology, the unique and first of its kind in India, is situated in the state capital.

==== Science and technology centres in Trivandrum ====
Thiruvananthapuram is a Research and Development hub in the fields of space science, information technology, bio-technology, and medicine. It is home to the Indian Institute of Science Education and Research, Vikram Sarabhai Space Centre (VSSC), Liquid Propulsion Systems Centre (LPSC), Thumba Equatorial Rocket Launching Station (TERLS), Indian Institute of Space Science and Technology (IIST), Rajiv Gandhi Centre for Biotechnology (RGCB), Tropical Botanical Garden and Research Institute, ER&DC – CDAC, CSIR – National Institute of Interdisciplinary Science and Technology, Free Software Foundation of India (FSFI), Regional Cancer Centre (RCC), Sree Chitra Thirunal Institute of Medical Sciences and Technology (SCTIMST), Centre for Earth Science Studies (CESS), Central Tuber Crops Research Institute (CTCRI), Priyadarsini Planetarium, The Oriental Research Institute & Manuscripts Library, Chief Disease Investigation Office(CDIO) Palode, Kerala Highway Research Institute, Kerala Fisheries Research Institute, etc. A scientific institution named National centre for molecular materials, for the research and development of biomedical devices and space electronics is to be established in Thiruvananthapuram. College of Architecture Trivandrum(CAT), which specialise only on the architecture course, is another institution proposed to set up in the suburbs of the city.

=== Kollam ===
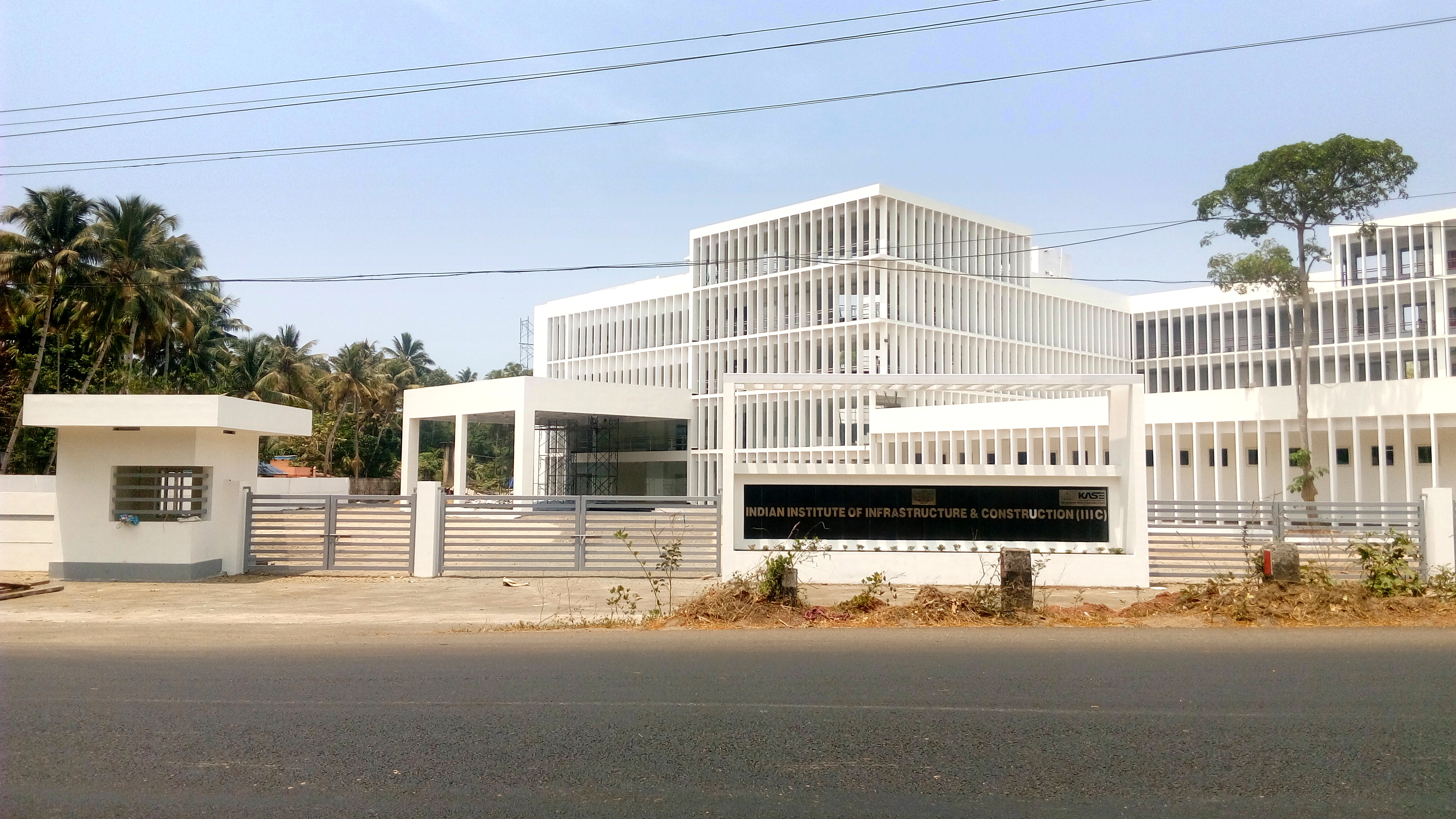
IIIC-Kollam in Chavara

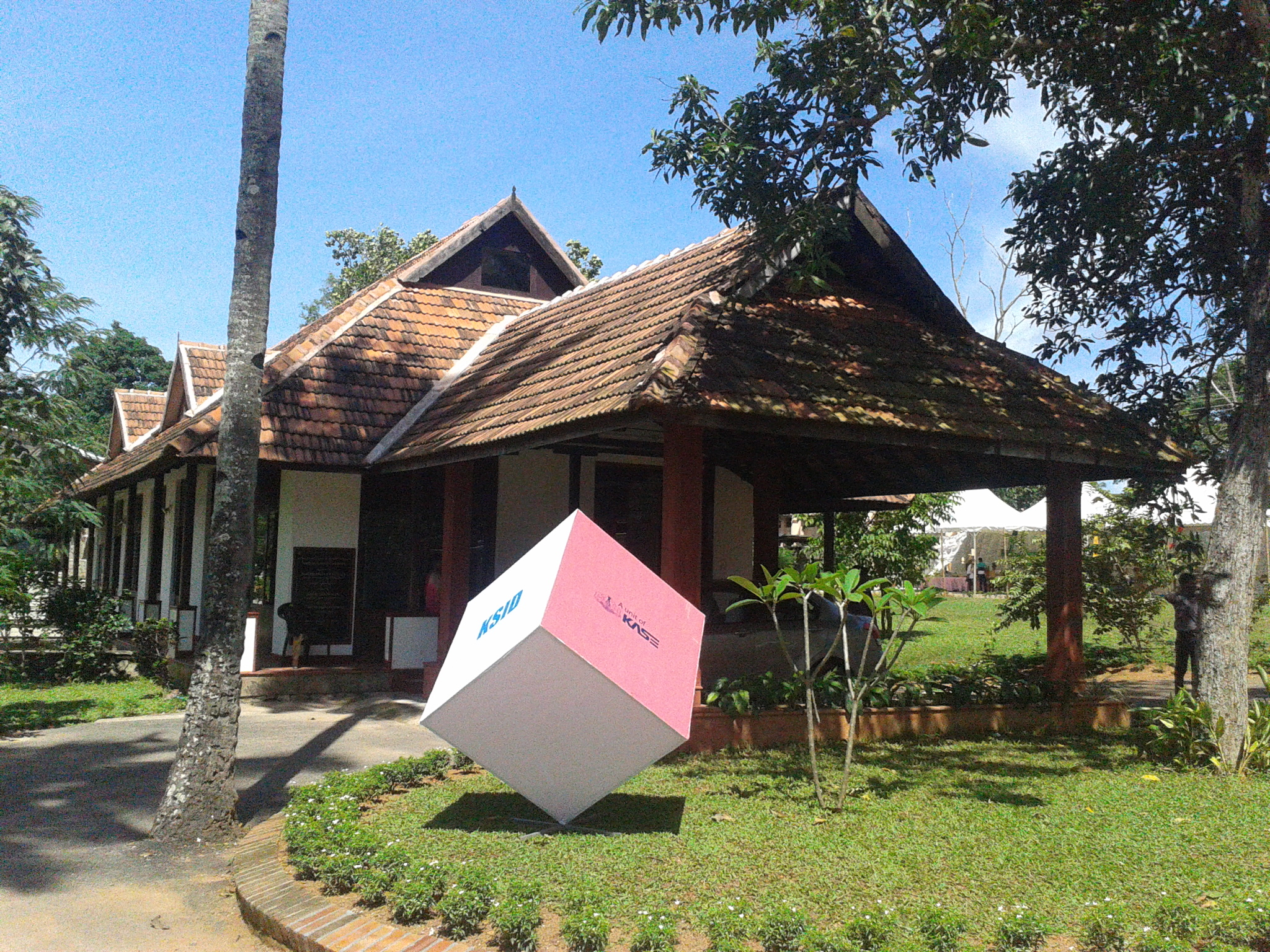
Kerala State Institute of Design in Chandanathope

The city of Kollam and its suburbs have plenty of educational institutes including medical colleges, engineering colleges, business management institutions, architectural institutes, state institutes dealing with fashion, design, construction studies, and marine studies. The Thangal Kunju Musaliar College of Engineering in Karikode is the first government aided engineering institution after India's independence and is the first of its kind in the state. Amrita Vishwa Vidyapeetham runs their Schools of Arts and Sciences, Ayurveda, Biotechnology, Business, Engineering, and Social Work institutions in Amritapuri in Kollam metropolitan area. There are several prominent arts and science, law, engineering, and management education institutions situated at the heart of the city namely Fatima Mata National College, SN College, SN Law College, Bishop Jerome Institute etc. The Kollam Government Medical College in Parippally, Travancore Medical College Hospital in Mevaram, and Azeezia Medical College in Meeyannoor are the 3 medical institutions in the district. Sree Narayanaguru Open University, the state's own open university named after Narayana Guru, has its headquarters at Kollam city.

State-owned institutions namely Indian Institute of Infrastructure and Construction, Institute of Fashion Technology Kerala, Kerala Maritime Institute, and Kerala State Institute of Design are located at the outskirts of Kollam city.

Apart from colleges, there are a number of bank coaching centres in Kollam city. Kollam is known as India's hub for bank test coaching centres with around 40 such institutes in the district. Students from various Indian states such as Tamil Nadu, Karnataka, Andhra Pradesh, Bihar, and Madhya Pradesh arrive at Kollam for coaching.

=== Kottayam ===
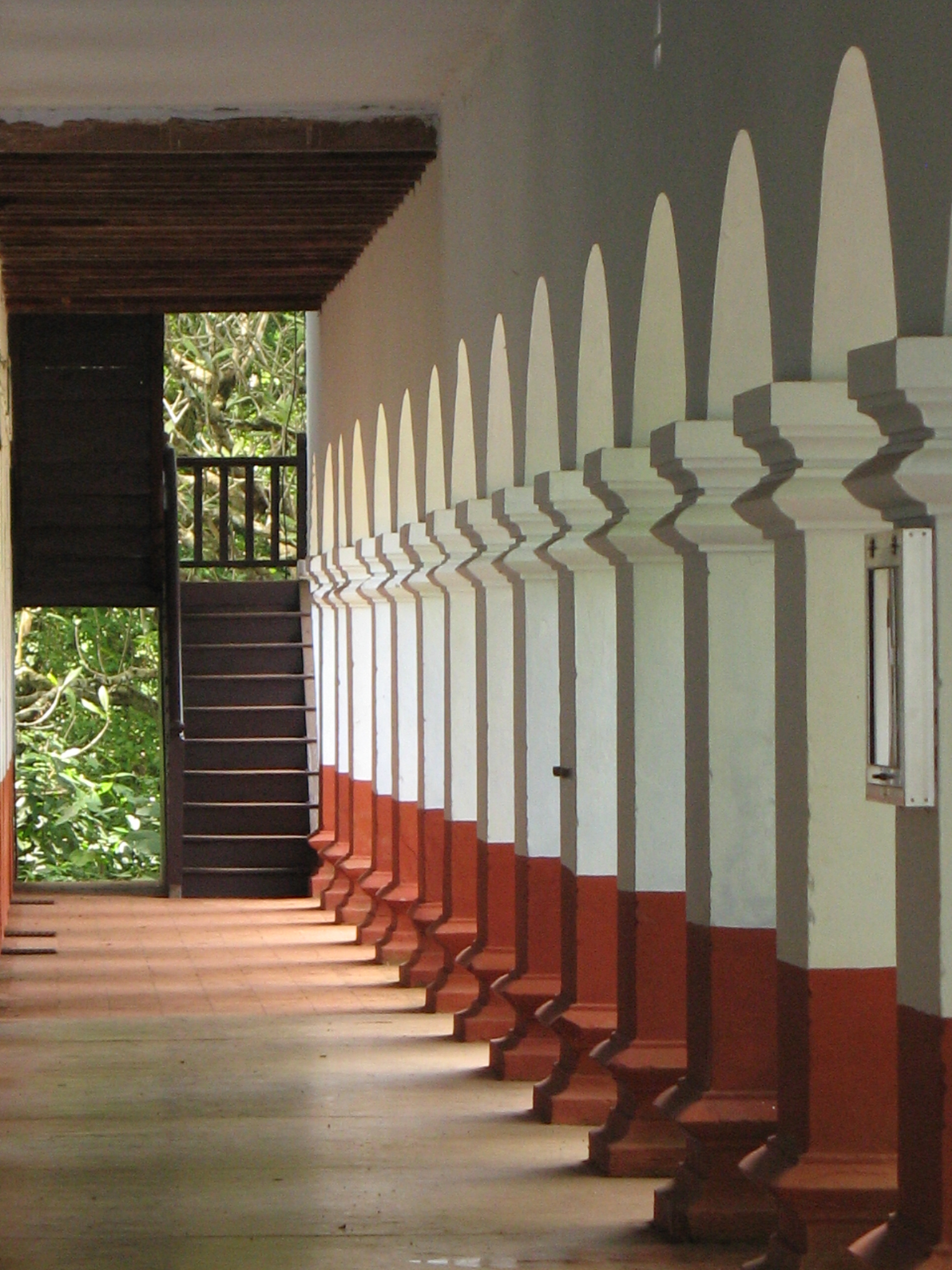
CMS College, Kottayam, established in 1817, is the first western-style college, and one of the oldest colleges, in India.

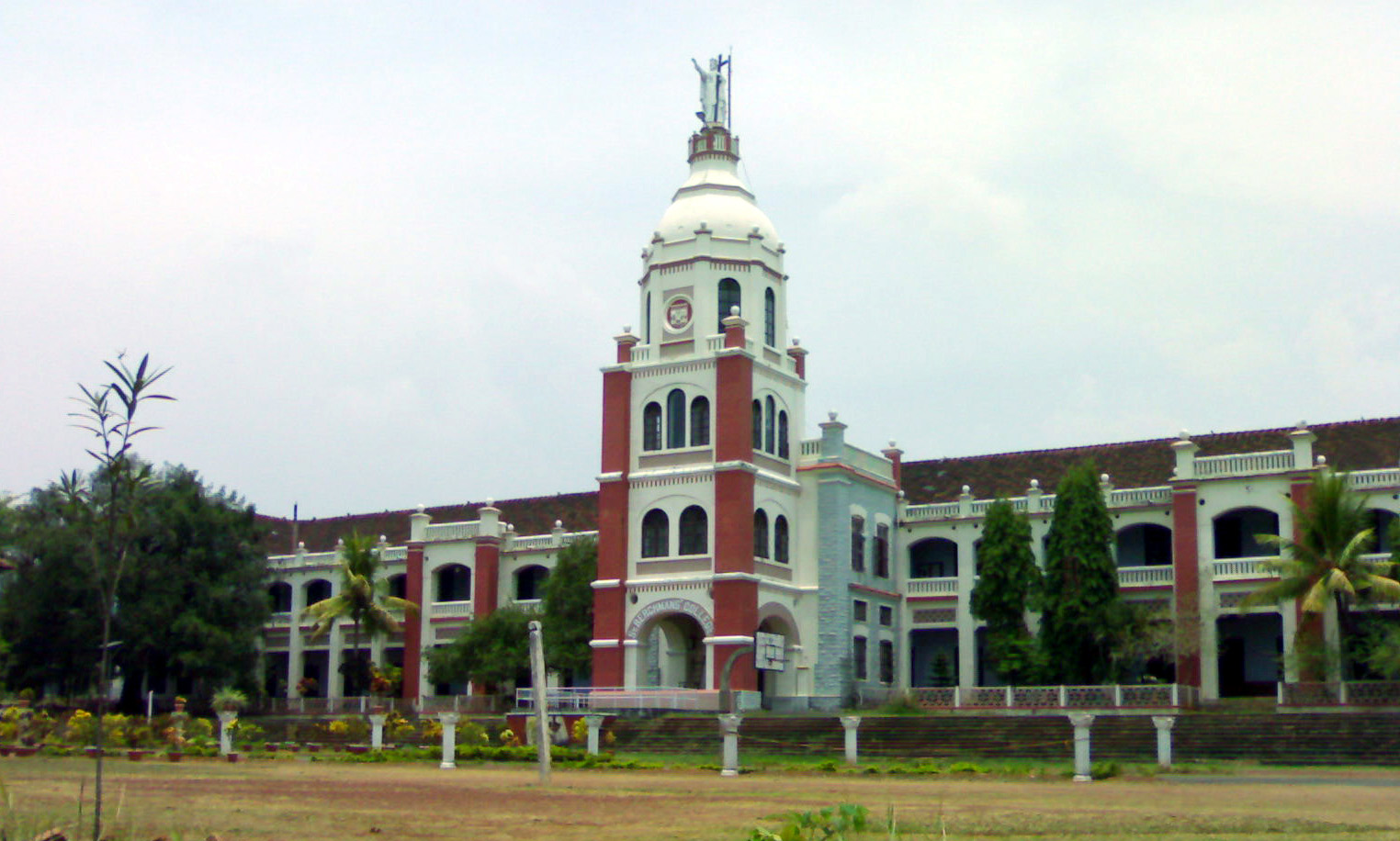
SB College Changanasserry, established in 1922, is one of the oldest and prestigious institutions of Higher Education in Central Kerala.

Kottayam is the first pioneer of higher education and is an education hub in Kerala. According to the 1991 census, Kottayam District of Kerala is the first district to achieve full literacy rate in the whole of India. One of the oldest colleges, CMS College Kottayam built by the CMS missionaries in 1815 and SB College Changanasserry built by Catholic Church clergies in 1922 were the first most reputed and noted institutions of higher education in central Travancore (now, Kottayam), that has now stood for more than a centenary. In 1983, Mahatma Gandhi University in Kottayam was established and is today a recognised premier university in the country. The Rajiv Gandhi Institute of Technology Kottayam (Government Engineering college) is one among the few elite engineering institutes of the state and Medical College Kottayam is a premier government medical institute in the state. The district also has its media college St Joseph College of Communication Changanasserry and a film school KR Narayanan National Institute of Visual Science and Arts.

Assumption College Changanasserry, St. Thomas College Pala, Alphonsa College Pala, Baselious College Kottayam, BCM College Kottayam, BK College Kottayam, KE College Mannanam, Government College Kottayam, Deva Matha College Kuravilangad, KG College Pampady, NSS Hindu College, Changanassery, St. Dominics College Kanjirapally, Saintgits College of Engineering Pathamuttam and Amal Jyothi College of Engineering, Koovappally are some of the other important educational institutions in the district.

One of the oldest schools St Berchmans Higher Secondary School Changanacherry and CMS Higher Secondary School Kottayam along with Lourdes Public School and Junior College, Girideepam Bethany schools, Sree Kumaramangalam Public School and Marian Senior Secondary School, Kottayam are the most reputed Secondary Schools in the district.

=== Pathanamthitta ===
Most of the colleges in Pathanamthitta district are in Adoor, Thiruvalla, Ranni, and Pathanamthitta. Some of them are St. Thomas College, Kozhencherry, Marthoma College, Thiruvalla, College of Engineering, Aranmula, Musaliar College of Engineering and Technology, Kumbazha, Believers Church Medical College, Kuttappuzha, Thiruvalla, Pushpagiri Colleges in Medicine, Pharmacy and Nursing, Thiruvalla, Titus II Teachers College, Thiruvalla, etc.

=== Idukki ===
The district is characterised by a large migration of people from Kerala's mainland as also labourers from neighbouring state of Tamil Nadu. Government Engineering College, Idukki, Jawaharlal Nehru Institute of Arts & Science, Kattappana, College of Engineering Munnar, College of Applied Science, Kattappana, Government College, MES College Nedumkandam, Kattappana Marian College, Kuttikanam, Mar Baselious College, and Kuttikanam, are some of the educational institutions in the district

=== Ernakulam / Kochi ===
College of Fisheries affiliated to Kerala Agricultural University is situated at Panangad, a suburban area of the city. Pothanicad, a village in Ernakulam district, is the first panchayath in India that achieved 100% literacy. Sree Sankaracharya University of Sanskrit (SSUS), also famous as Sanskrit University, is situated in Kalady, in the Northern side of Ernakulam District. Other recognised institutions are:

- Cochin University of Science and Technology
- Sree Sankaracharya University of Sanskrit
- Central Marine Fisheries Research Institute
- Kerala University of Fisheries and Ocean Studies
- Central Institute of Fisheries Nautical and Engineering Training
- National University of Advanced Legal Studies
- National Institute of Oceanography, India
- Naval Physical and Oceanographic Laboratory
- Central Institute of Fisheries Technology

=== Thrissur ===
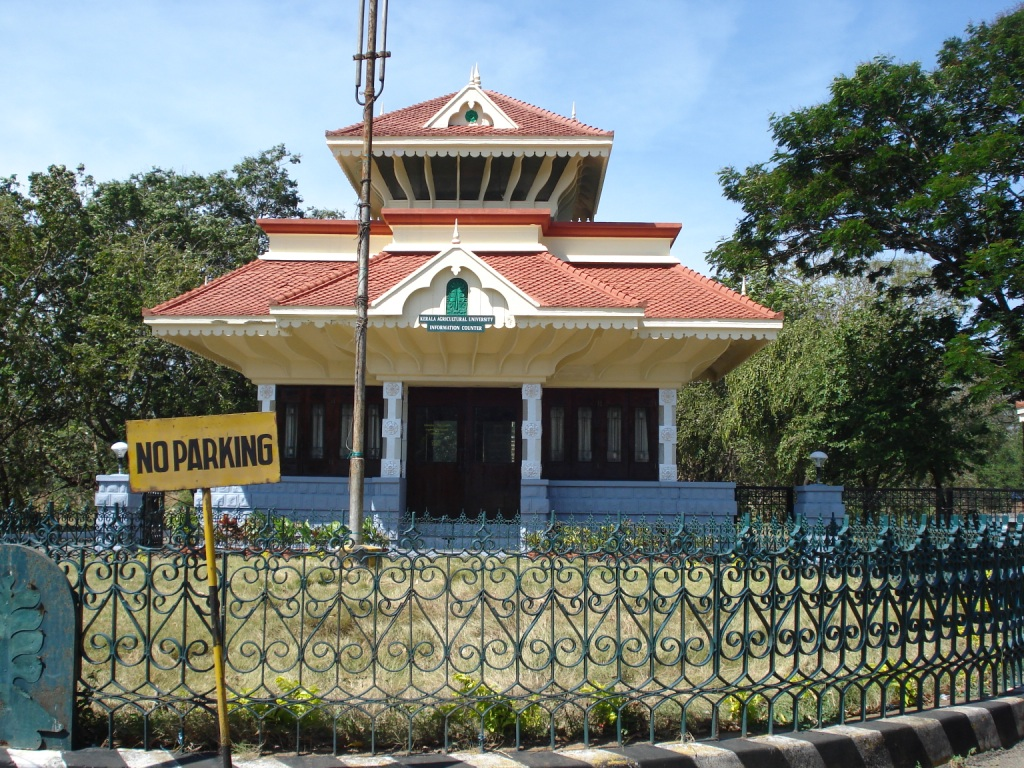
Kerala Agricultural University headquartered at Thrissur

St. Thomas College, Thrissur is the oldest college in the erstwhile princely state of Cochin and present day Thrissur district. It is also the third non-government college (Union Christian College, Aluva being the first and SB College, Changanassery being second) to be recognised as a first grade college under University of Madras, among others in then existed princely states of Travancore, Cochin, and Malabar which later became mostly the present geographical area of Kerala.

Thrissur is considered as an education hub for medical education, the city has three medical colleges. It is the only district that has four universities: Kerala Agricultural University (KAU), Kerala University of Health Sciences (KUHS), Kerala Kalamandalam, and Kerala Institute of Local Administration (KILA).

Kerala Institute of Local Administration is the only educational institution in Kerala where the training for IAS candidates takes place. Thrissur has Kerala Police Academy, Academy for Central Excise, Kerala Forest Research Institute, and research institutes under KAU.

The district of Thrissur holds some of the premier institutions in Kerala such as Government Engineering College, Govt. Law College, Ayurveda College, Govt. Fine Arts College, College of Veterinary and Animal Sciences, Sree Rama Varma Music School etc. Thrissur was a main center of coaching for the entrance examinations for engineering and medicine.

St. Joseph's College, Irinjalakuda, Thrissur is the only institution in Kerala State to offer a government-aided B.Sc. Biotechnology program.

=== Palakkad ===
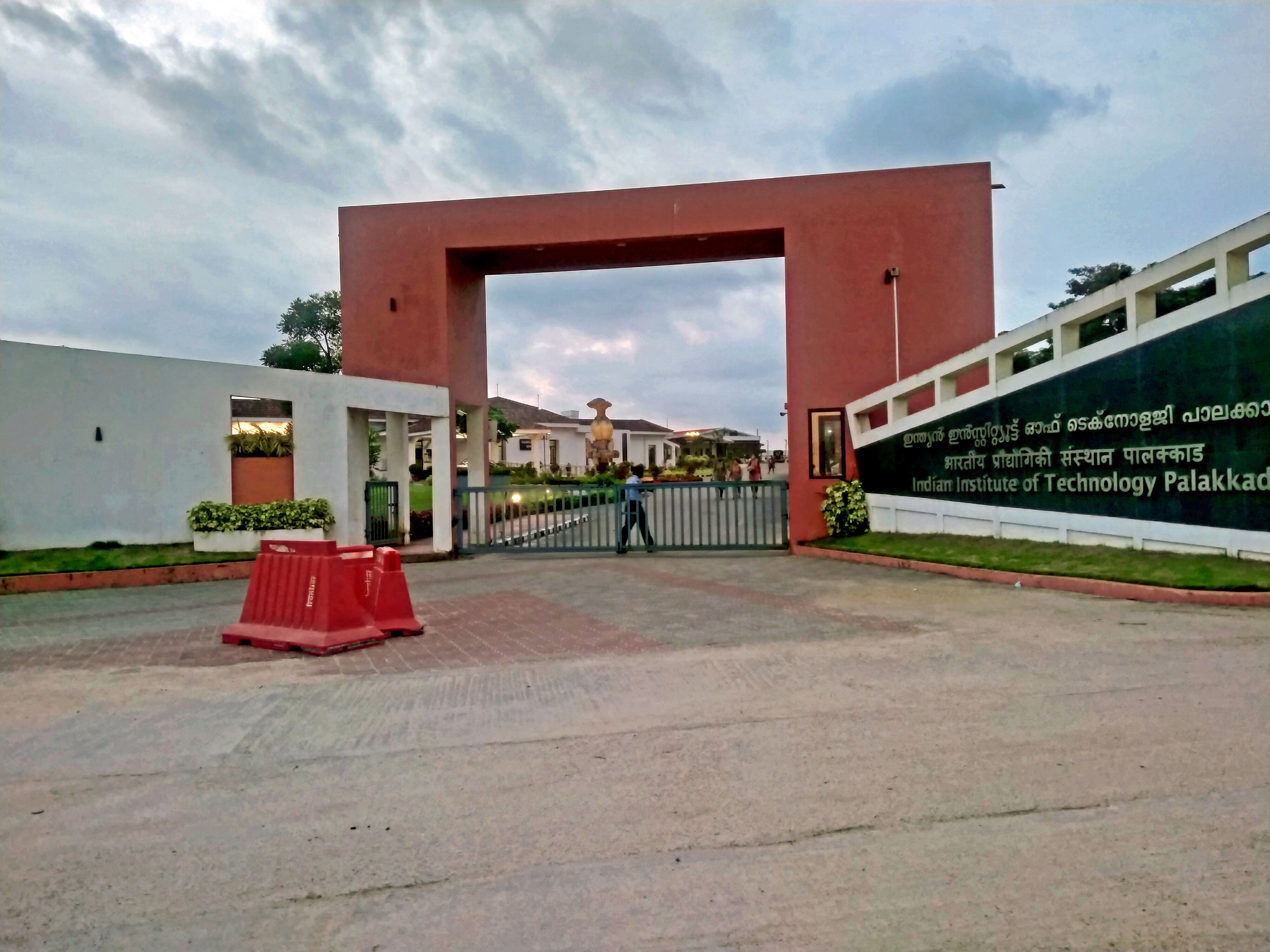
Indian Institute of Technology, Palakkad

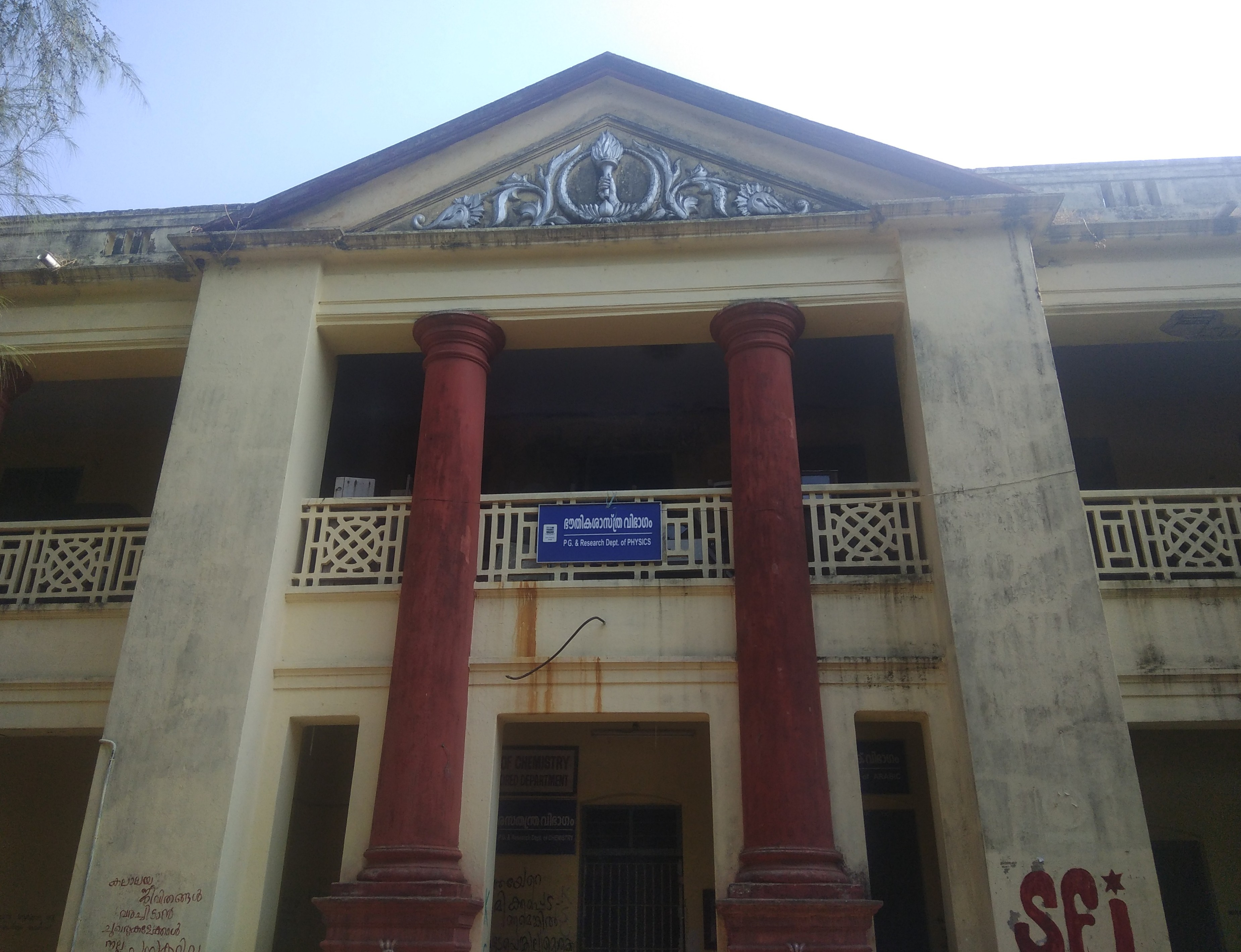
Physics Department of Government Victoria College, Palakkad. The college was established in the year 1866, making it one of the oldest colleges in South Malabar

Palakkad city is home to the only Indian Institute of Technology in Kerala. Government Victoria College, Palakkad, established in 1866, is one of the oldest colleges in the state. Government Medical College, Palakkad started in 2014 is the first Government medical college in the district. The NSS College of Engineering at Akathethara, is one of government aided engineering institution and the Fourth Engineering Institution established in Kerala. The Chembai Memorial Government Music College is one of the main centres of excellence in teaching Carnatic music in the state. The Mercy College, Palakkad, established in 1964 is the first women's college in the district and one of the familiar institution in Palakkad city. Government Engineering College, Palakkad is situated at Sreekrishnapuram.

=== Malappuram ===
The Kerala school of astronomy and mathematics flourished between the 14th and 16th centuries. In attempting to solve astronomical problems, the Kerala school independently created a number of important mathematics concepts, including series expansion for trigonometric functions. The Kerala School of Astronomy and Mathematics was based at Vettathunadu (Tirur region).

The progress that Malappuram district has achieved in the field of education during the last four decades is tremendous. Great strides have been made in the field of female education. The district plays a significant role in the higher education sector of the state. It is home to two of the main universities in the state- the University of Calicut centered at Tenhipalam which was established in 1968 as the second university in Kerala, and the Thunchath Ezhuthachan Malayalam University centered at Tirur which was established in the year 2012. AMU Malappuram Campus, one of the three off-campus centres of Aligarh Muslim University (AMU), is situated in Cherukara, which was established by the AMU in 2010. An off-campus of the English and Foreign Languages University functions at Panakkad. The district is also home to a subcentre of Kerala Agricultural University at Thavanur, and a subcentre of Sree Sankaracharya University of Sanskrit at Tirunavaya. The headquarters of Darul Huda Islamic University is at Chemmad, Tirurangadi. INKEL Greens at Malappuram provides an educational zone with the industrial zone. Eranad Knowledge City at Manjeri is a first of its kind project in the state. The MES College of Engineering, Kuttippuram, is the first established engineering college under the self financing sector in Kerala, an urban campus that extends more than a mile (1.6 km) alongside the Bharathappuzha river. The KCAET at Thavanur established in 1963, is the only agricultural engineering institute in the state. The Government Ayurveda Research Institute for Mental Disease at Pottippara near Kottakkal is the only government Ayurvedic mental hospital in Kerala. It is also the first of its type under the public sector in the country. Kerala Ayurvedic Studies and Research Society (KASRS) under Government of Kerala is situated at Edarikode near Kottakkal. The Government of Kerala has proposed to establish one more university, Ayurveda University, at Kottakkal.

The district has religious educational institutions such as Darul Huda Islamic University and Maadin Educational Academy which has more than 30 affiliated colleges throughout Kerala. Non-profit organisations include (1967) Kondotty.

AMU Malappuram Campus is the centre of Aligarh Muslim University of higher education learning, located in Cherukara village of Perinthalmanna in the hills of Chelamala. It has five years Law course after 12th class, MBA and B.ed after graduation. Major educational institutes are:

- University of Calicut
- Malayalam University
- AMU Malappuram Campus

=== Kozhikode ===
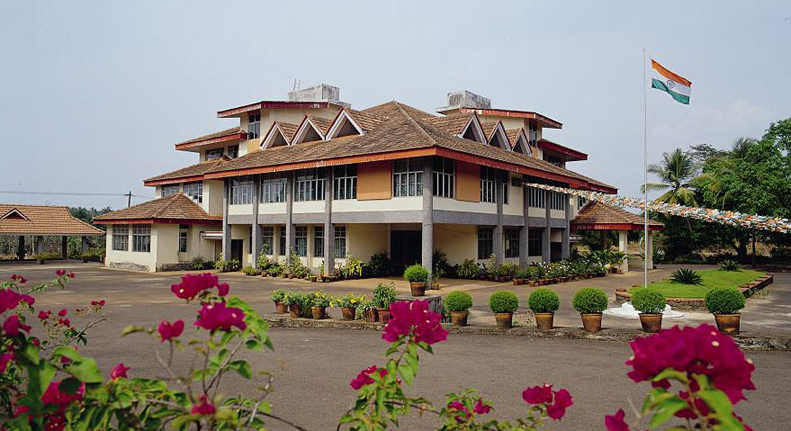
National Institute of Technology Calicut

Kozhikode is the major education city in Kerala which is home to three of the premier educational institutions in the country;

- NITC
- IIMK
- NIELIT
- IISR
- CWRDM
- KSoM

Other important educational institutions in the district include Markaz Knowledge City, Markazu Saqafathi Sunniyya, Calicut Medical College, Government Law College, Calicut, Government Engineering College Kozhikode, College of Applied Science IHRD, Kiliyand Kozhikode, College of Nursing Calicut, Govt. Dental College, Co-Operative Institute of Technology, and Govt. Polytechnic College.

=== Wayanad ===
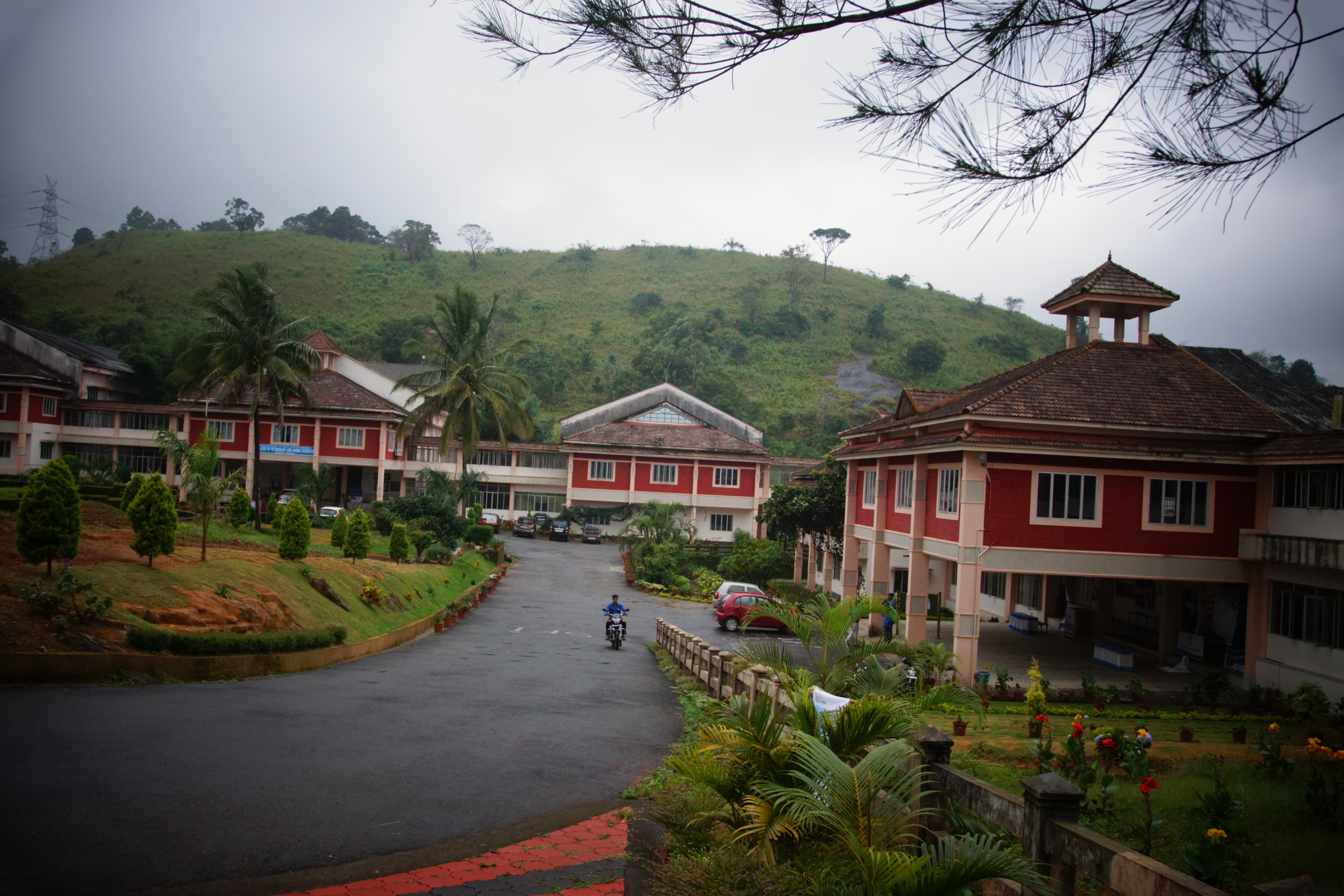
Kerala Veterinary and Animal Sciences University, Wayanad

The Kerala Veterinary and Animal Sciences University is headquartered at Pookode in Vythiri.

=== Kannur ===
Kannur district has the Kannur University; (This is a multi-campus University having campuses at Kasaragod, Kannur, Thalassery and Mananthavady – The Headquarters of the university is situated at Thavakkara, Kannur), one Government Engineering College, one Government Ayurveda College and several arts and sciences colleges. It also hosts the 13th Centre of NIFT (National Institute of Fashion Technology). The people of Kannur, with the effective leadership of Mr M.V. Raghavan established a full-fledged Medical College in Co-operative sector at Pariyaram. Kannur Medical College at Anjarakandy is a private Medical College located in this district. A private sector Ayurveda Medical College is situated at Parassinikkadavu. The Indian Naval Academy, located at Ezhimala, is Asia's largest, and the world's third-largest, naval academy. Government Brennen College, Thalassery, founded by philanthropist Edward Brennen in 1862, is among the oldest educational institutions in India.

=== Kasaragod ===
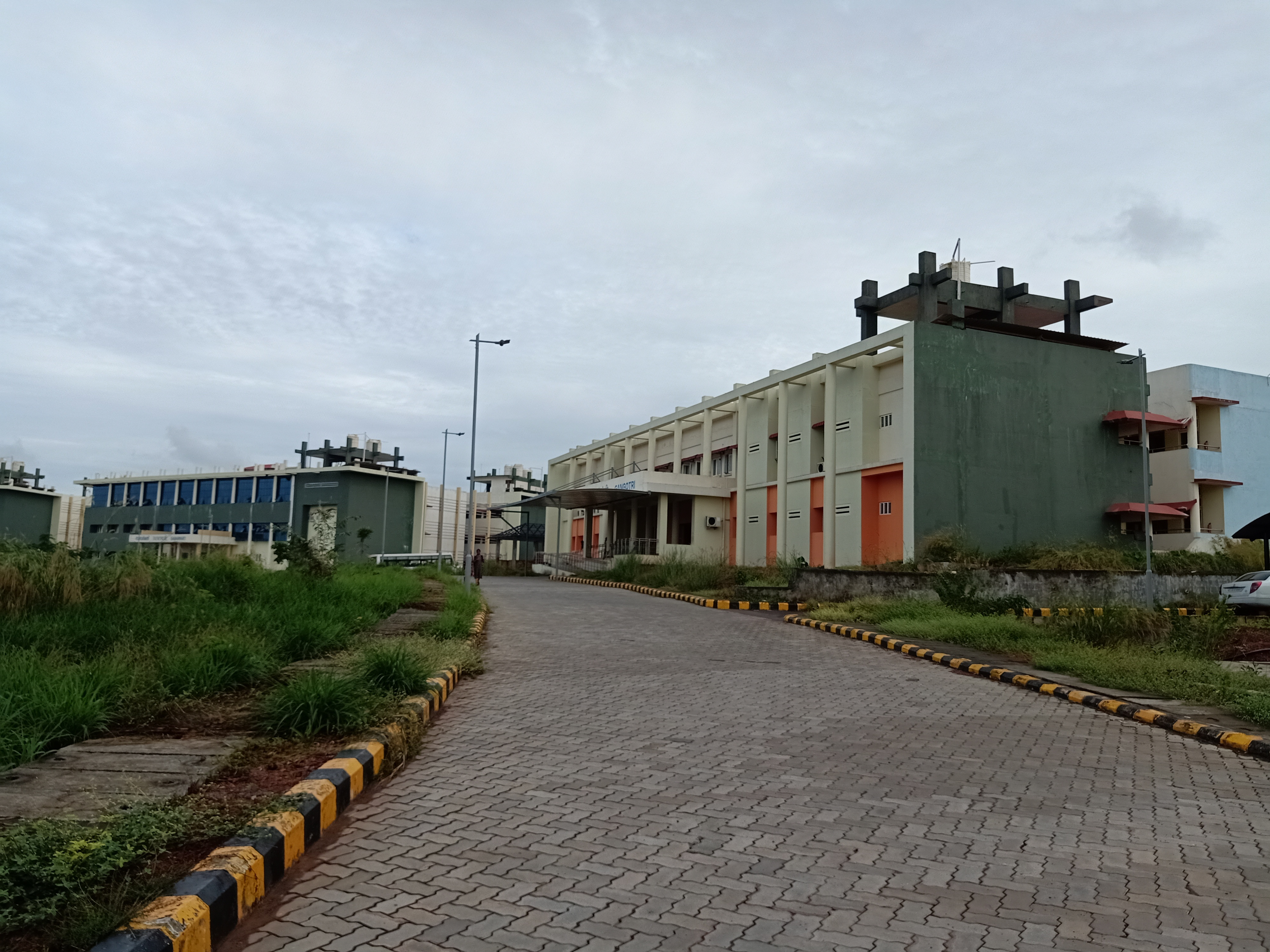
Central University of Kerala, Kasaragod

Kasaragod is home to the Central Plantation Crops Research Institute, originally established in 1916 as the Coconut Research Station. It is part of India's National Agricultural Research System under the Indian Council of Agricultural Research. According to the institute, Kerala "lies in the heart of the major coconut growing areas of the country." It is also home to the Indian Society for Plantation Crops, which publishes the Journal of Plantation Crops and holds symposiums on the subject. The Central University of Kerala is also located in Kasargod (Periya hills).

- The Central Plantation Crops Research Institute at Kasaragod was established in 1916.
- The Central University of Kerala was established in 2009.
- Kasaragod is also home to Kerala Tulu Academy promoting the research on Tulu language.

== See also ==
- Kerala Infrastructure Investment Fund Board
- KEAM
- List of educational institutions in Kerala
- Institute of Human Resources Development
- Economy of Kerala
- Unemployment in Kerala
- Pallikoodam
- Religious education in Kerala
