= Religious education in Kerala =

Religious education in Kerala through education system of Gurukula

Religious education in Kerala was historically influenced by traditional Indian religions like Hinduism, Buddhism and Jainism through the ancient education system of Gurukula. Abrahamic religions were practiced in Kerala through the early days of maritime trade. Buddhism added educational vocabulary, including Namostu Jinatam, Ezhuthu Palli, and Pallikoodam to the Malayalam language. Madrasa institutions, coordinated by various Madarasa education boards referred to as Othupalli or Palli Dar since the independence of India. Modern Christian education began in the early 19th century.

== Hinduism ==
According to Sudha Nambudiri, Thanthra Vidyapeedam, a low profile Vedic and tantric pathshala (ritual school) in Aluva founded by Kalpuzha Divakaran Namboodiripad and P. Madhavji in 1972 taught students in Kerala's temple shastra, Kerala's form of temple rituals, which follows Adi Shankara traditions in the Gurukulam system. Namboodiripad says Vidyapeedam only admits ten tenth standard passed boys with prior academic knowledge of the Sanskrit language, selected on the basis of their individual horoscopes every year. The seven year curriculum includes theoretical and practical studies in temple rituals based on Tantra Samuchayam, authored by Chennas Narayanan Nampoothiri, the Vedas, the Sanskrit language, Vaastu Shastra, Jyothisha, Yoga and meditation. When completed, students are awarded a postgraduate level degree known as Thanthraratna in Sanskrit by Ujjain's Maharishi Sandipani Rashtriya Ved Vidya Pratishthan and promotes students to temple priests or Sanskrit language teachers. Aarsha Vidya Samajam founded by Aacharya Sri K R Manoj Ji at 1999 is an educational institution for preaching of Pancha Kartavyas; five duties: Adhyayana (Study), Anushthana (Practice), Pracharana (Promotion), Adhyapana (Teaching) and Samrakshana (Protection) of Sanathana Dharma. This institution was born with the Anugraha and Ashirwada of great Gurus for achieving the motto of Krinwantho Vishwamaryam; to make the whole world noble, through right education of Sanathana Dharma, which was not merely a divine call, but also a vision of the Aarsha Guru Paramparas, prayer of the Sadhaks, dream of our ancestors, and the birth purpose of our nation itself.

== Buddhism ==
Buddhism has historical influences on educational culture in Kerala. The origin of the names Ezhuthu Palli and Pallikoodam trace back to the roots of Buddhism. Until the end of the 18th century, the word Namostu Jinatam (Namotu Chinatam) was used in the beginning of Kerala's education courses for praying to the Buddha. At that time, the script of Kerala was called Nanam Manam. It is an abbreviation of the Pali verses Naanam, Monam, Ettanam, Thuvanam, Jeenam, Ennanam, Thanam and Ummanam, corresponding to the eight noble ways: the right perspective, the right goal, the right speech, the right action, the right way of life, the right focus, the right concentration, and the right effort.

== Christianity ==
In 1815, British resident Colonel John Munro founded a seminary in Kottayam for the theological education of Jacobite Christian priests and invited the Anglican missionaries to teach there. From there, a connection was formed between the Church Mission Society and the Saint Thomas Christians of the Puthenkuttukar, or New Allegiance. Restrictions were imposed on Saint Thomas Christian parishes in order to start new schools, and later on the Travancore Diwan after they attempted to take over the schools owned by the community. The St. Joseph's LP School in Koonammavu was the first Catholic school for girls, and the first convent in Kerala was established in 1868 in a bamboo-mat house by Mother Eliswa, who later established more schools for girls.

== Islam ==
According to K. Mohammed Basheer, Kerala has one of the oldest madrasa (Malayalam: othupalli / Palli Dar) education systems in India which has been reformed in modern times to include non-religious and religious subjects. Muslim communities, specifically Mappilas, form literate communities amongst Muslims in India. Historically, madrasas used to impart primary education about the mosque and the imams in it. Madrasas were non-residential, whilst residential facilities supported by mosques and the Muslim village community were called Palli Dar. During the British colonisation of India, madrasas were upgraded to centres of primary education. Post-independence, madrasas hold religious education classes before or after regular schools. The All Kerala Islamic Education Board were the first organization to conduct centralized examinations; subsequently, different schools of Islamic beliefs came forward to form their own Islamic education boards to train teachers and conduct centralized examinations: the Samastha Kerala Islam Matha Vidyabhyasa Board (SKIMVB), the Dakshiana Kerala Islam Matha Vidyabhyasa Board (DKIMVB), the Samastha Kerala Sunni Vidyabhyasa Board (SKSVB) and the Samastha Kerala Islamic Education Board (SKIEB). They are all grounded in Ahl as-Sunnah, whereas the Kerala Nadvathul Mujahideen Vidyabhyasa Board (KNM) and The Council for Islamic Education and Research (CIER) are rooted in Ahl-i Hadith. The Majlis al Ta'alim al Islami Kerala (Majlis) represent Jamaat-e-Islami.

Although the Kerala government does not have its own centralizing Madrasa board, Kerala madrasas affiliate themselves to various madrasa boards backed by various religious institutions, based on different ideologies. Among them, the Samastha Kerala Islam Matha Vidyabhyasa Board (SKIMVB) is the largest, with 80 percent of madrasa stating they are connected to Kerala.

Since the 20th century, Arabic language classes have been implemented in Kerala for advanced religious education.

Islamic universities operate in Kerala, including Markazu Saqafathi Sunniyya and Darul Huda Islamic University.

=== Samastha Kerala Islam Matha Vidyabhyasa Board ===
The SKIMVB has affiliation of around ten thousand madrasas that account to around one million students and fifty thousand teachers, mainly from Kerala. It is headquartered at Kozhikode, Kerala, along with regional offices in Delhi, Mumbai, Kolkata, Bengal and Bangalore.

The Samastha Kerala Islam Matha Vidyabhyasa Board is affiliated to Samastha Kerala Jem-iyyathul Ulama.

== See also ==
- Education in Kerala
- Religion in Kerala
- Kerala Yukthivadi Sangham
- Dinkoism
- Basel Evangelical Mission Parsi High School, Thalassery

== Bibliography ==
- Dr. A. Antony, Teacher and Education in Indian Society. N.p., Notion Press, 2016. ISBN 9781945497780
- Kamat, Sangeeta; Mathew, Biju (2010). "Religion, education and the politics of recognition: A critique and a counter-proposal". Comparative Education. 46 (3): 359–376. doi:10.1080/03050068.2010.503746. JSTOR 27856176. S2CID 144742448.
- Mohammed, U.. Educational Empowerment of Kerala Muslims: A Socio-historical Perspective. India, Indian Council of Historical Research, 2007. P.P. 69 ISBN 9788190388733
- Osella, Filippo; Osella, Caroline (2008). "Islamism and Social Reform in Kerala, South India" (PDF). Modern Asian Studies. 42 (2–3): 317–346. doi:10.1017/S0026749X07003198. S2CID 143932405.
- Sexuality, Abjection and Queer Existence in Contemporary India. India, Taylor & Francis, 2021.
- Sikand, Yoginder. Bastions of the Believers: Madrasas and Islamic Education in India. India, Penguin Books India, 2005. P.P. 129 ISBN 9780144000203
- A Study of the Christian Colleges in Kerala: Report of the Commission for Christian Colleges, 1980–81. India, Kerala Educational Research Centre, 1982.
