= Kerala Maritime Institute =

Indian maritime college

Kerala Maritime Institute, Neendakara, Kollam
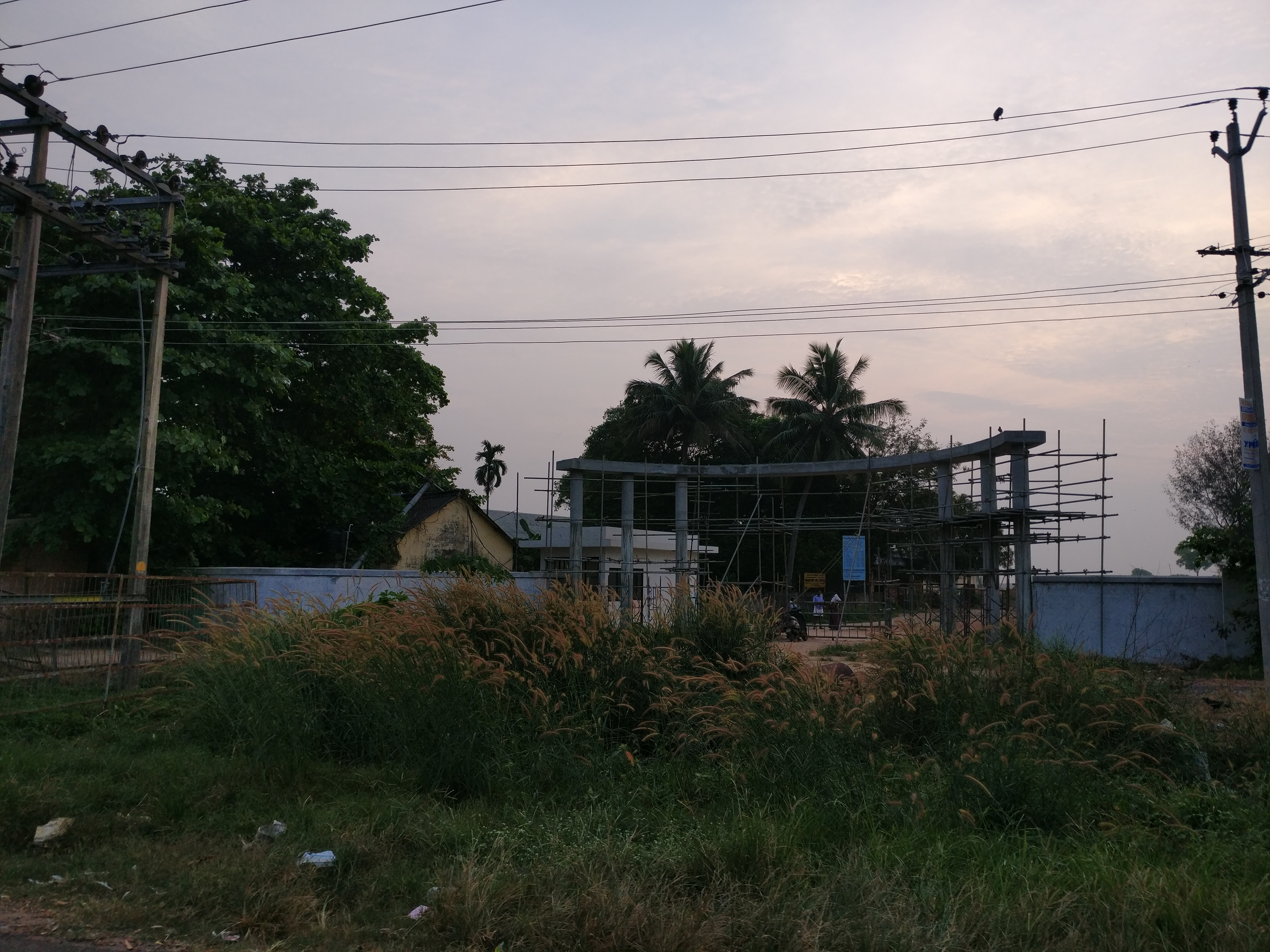
- Entrance of Kerala Maritime Institute
- Founders: V. S. Achuthanandan (ex-Chief Minister of Kerala)
- Established: 4 May 2010
- Chair: Adv.V.J. Mathew
- Key people: K. R. Vinothu; Chief Operating Officer Mariapron; Campus Manager
- Owner: Government of Kerala
- Address: Neendakara Port, Kollam-691582
- Location: Neendakara, Kollam, Kerala, India
- Coordinates: 8.937346°N 76.542189°E
- Interactive map of Kerala Maritime Institute, Neendakara, Kollam
- Website: Keralaports.gov.in

Kerala Maritime Institute is an institute for maritime education in the state established by the Government of Kerala at Neendakara in Kollam city, India. The institute was created by the Port Department of Kerala state to give training for students in Kerala. The campus is located on 10 acres of land attached to the Neendakara Port. More than 5,000 students have been trained at Neendakara maritime institute under the Boat Crew training programme. The institute has played a major role in reducing the number of state-wide inland navigation accidents. The headquarters of the institute is at Neendakara.

The institute was inaugurated on 4 May 2010, by V. S. Achuthanandan, former Chief Minister of Kerala.

== History ==
The idea for starting Government owned maritime institutes in Kerala state was first conceived by V. S. Achuthanandan lead Kerala Government in 2009. The then Port Minister of the state M. Vijayakumar announced the project on 23 May 2009. N.K. Premachandran, Water Resource Minister, took the initiatives for setting-up the institute at Neendakara port complex.

In March 2012, the Oommen Chandy lead Government sanctioned Rs. 24.8 crore for the construction of a new campus at Neendakara. The courses are certified by the All India Council for Technical Education (AICTE). The institute has also secured approval from the Directorate General of Shipping. On 21 February 2016, K. Babu, Minister for Fisheries, Ports and Excise of Kerala, inaugurated the new campus.

== Facilities ==
- Academic block
- Hostels for students and staffs
- Library
- Canteen
- Parade ground
- Swimming pool
- Auditorium

== See also ==
- Kollam
- Institute of Fashion Technology Kerala
- Indian Institute of Infrastructure and Construction
- Kerala State Institute of Design
- Neendakara
