= Sree Rama Varma Music School =

S.R.V. (Sreerama Varma) Govt. College Of Music And Performing Arts
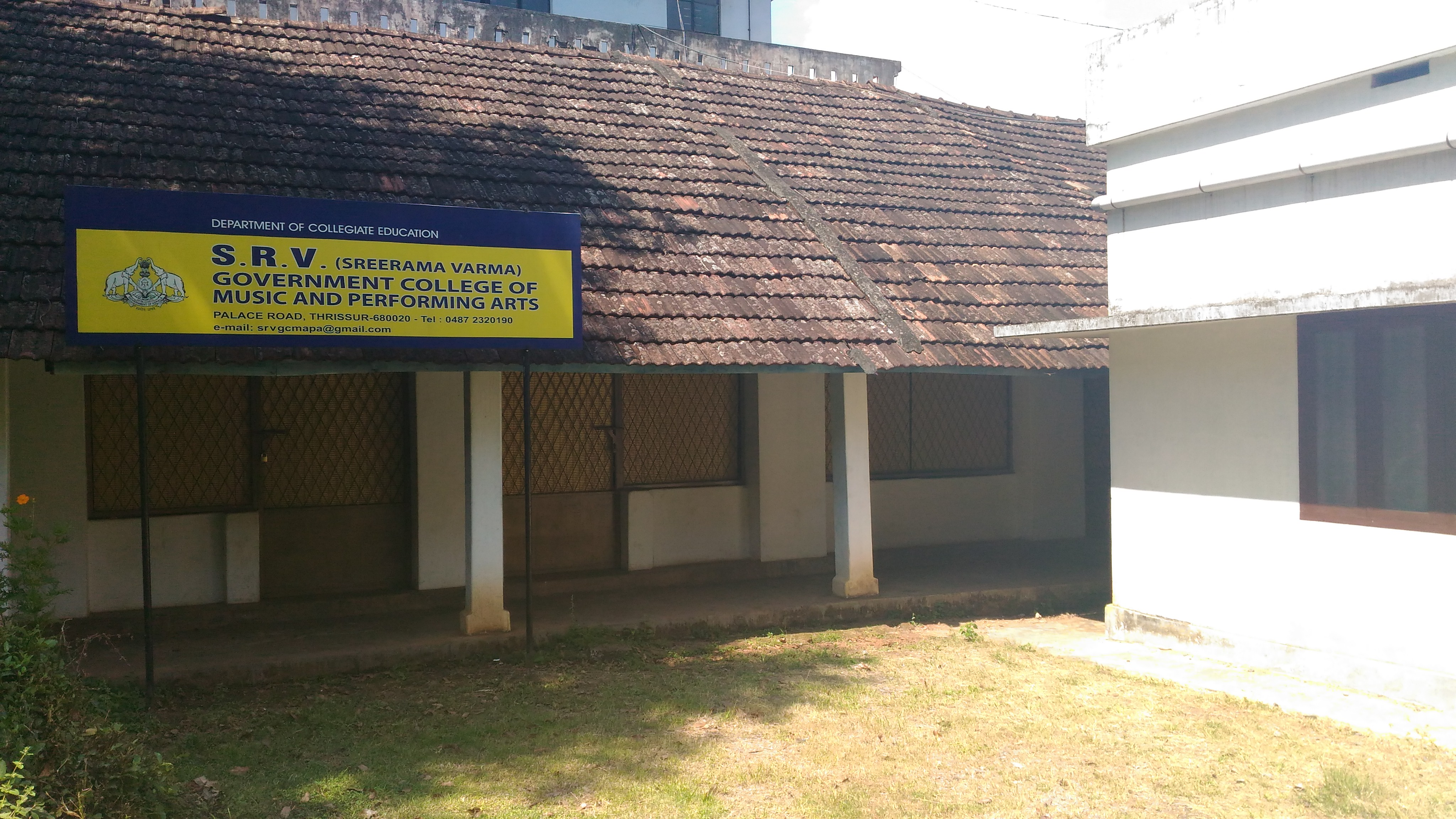
- Trissur, Kerala; India

Information
- Former name: Sree Rama Varma Music School
- School type: Music, Girls.
- Established: 1910
- Founder: Rama Varma XV

Sree Rama Varma Music School is a music school situated in Thrissur city in Kerala, India and it is the first music school in Kerala state. The school is also known as S.R.V. Music School. In 2016, the institution was upgraded as a music college with the name of S.R.V. (Sreerama Varma) Govt. College Of Music And Performing Arts.

== History ==
The school was established on 19 July 1910 by Rama Varma XV, Maharaja of Cochin aiming to teach Indian classical musics to the ladies of Cochin Royal Family and it was later taken over by the government. Of late, it was attached to the Government Model Girls’ Higher Secondary School.

The Government of Kerala decided to close the school in 2012. Memorandums were submitted to the authorities. The Human Rights Commission Justice R. Nadarajan produced a notice to government to consider the issue. Adv.Therambil Ramakrishnan, MLA, had raised in the Assembly the issue of upgrading the school as a college, and the Education Minister had promised to take steps.

=== Upgrading ===
The government appointed a commission to report about the issue. The commission, Prof.M.Balasubrahmanyam reported to the government to upgrade the school. Finally the order of the termination of S.R.V Music School was Withdrawn and the school was upgraded as a music college.

== Courses ==
The school previously offers the Senior Music Certificate course. There are 4 Courses affiliated with Calicut University.
