= Lourdes Public School and Junior College, Kottayam =

Lourdes Public School

Location
- Collectorate P.O. Kottayam, India, Kerala, 686002; India; 9.586871°N 76.534281°E

Information
- School type: Private Trust, Co-educational Public School
- Motto: Duty. Dignity. Divinity
- Denomination: Roman Catholic
- Patron saint: Our Lady of Lourdes
- Established: 1996
- School district: Kottayam
- Manager: Rev. Fr. Joseph Manakalam
- Language: English
- Accreditation: CBSE
- Publication: Lourdean and Lourdean Voice
- Website: lourdespublicschool.com

Lourdes Public School is an English medium co-educational institution recognized by Central Board of Secondary Education, established in 1996 by Lourdes Educational Trust on behalf of the Lourdes Forane Church of the Archdiocese of Changanacherry. The school is located in the heart of Kottayam town, opposite the District Headquarters in the state of Kerala, India.

== Cultural activities and sports ==
Apart from academic activities, the school also provides training in co-curricular activities. The school imparts training in cultural activities, such as vocal music, dance, painting and crafts, instrumental music and cooking. The school also participates in the CBSE youth festivals held under the banner of Sahodaya Association.

Various clubs are organized and conduct debates, exhibitions, quizzes and study tours. In 2020, students won prizes in a quiz contest organized by the Department of Consumer Affairs and The Hindu. In 2014, students participated in a celebration of the Indian Space Research Organisation. The Students' Literary Association is held every week to provide opportunity to develop student talents. Every year elections to the school parliament are held to inculcate democratic values in students.

The school celebrates important days and festivals, like Onam, Independence Day and Christmas. The school also celebrates Teachers' day, with the older students taking over the teaching of the younger classes. Other important days in an academic year include Literary Association Inauguration, School Day celebration, Sports Day, and Arts Festival.

The school conducts an annual All Kerala School Basketball tournament for the Lourdean Trophy since 2003. The Physical Education Department also organizes various outdoor programs.

== Rankings ==
Lourdes Public School was ranked 1st among the Co-ed day schools in Kottayam, 2nd in Kerala and 99th in India in the Indian Day Schools League Table by Education World for 2013.
