= Bernardine Baccinelli =

Indian Roman Catholic bishop

The Most Reverend Bernardine Baccinelli
- Titular Archbishop of Pharsalus; Vicar Apostolic of Verapoly
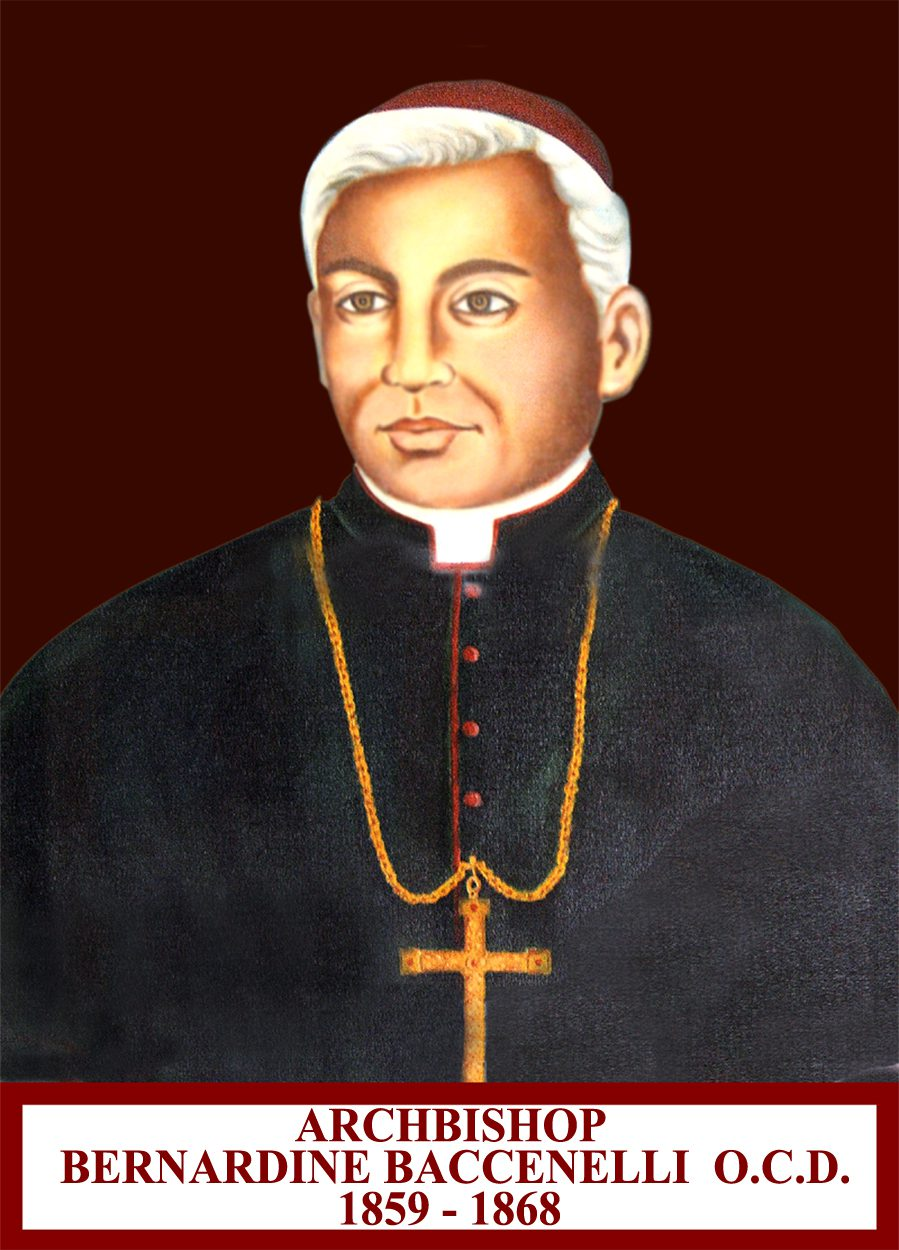
- Church: Catholic Church
- Archdiocese: Verapoly (Vicariate Apostolic)
- Appointed: 1855 (as Vicar Apostolic); later titular Archbishop
- Previous post: Carmelite missionary priest

Orders
- Ordination: 1830

Personal details
- Born: Giuseppe Bernardo (later Bernardino) Baccinelli; 1807 Italy
- Died: 5 September 1868 (aged 60–61) Varapuzha, Kerala, India
- Denomination: Catholic
- Residence: Varapuzha (Verapoly)

Bernardine Baccinelli of St. Teresa, OCD (1807–1868) was an Italian Carmelite missionary and ecclesiastical leader who served as Vicar Apostolic of Verapoly (Kerala, India) and later as titular Archbishop of Pharsalus. He is widely credited with pioneering parish-based universal education, charitable systems, and reforms in priestly formation that influenced Kerala's social and literacy renaissance.

== Early life ==
Baccinelli (born Giuseppe Bernardo, later Bernardino) was ordained a Carmelite priest in Rome in 1830 and entered the Discalced Carmelites (OCD). He arrived in Kerala on 17 November 1833 and settled at Varapuzha (Verapoly), where he learned Malayalam and began pastoral ministry that would span 35 years.

== Missionary work and educational initiatives ==
In 1856, Baccinelli issued the pastoral decree commonly remembered as Pallikkoppam Pallikkoodam (“a school in every church courtyard”), directing that every parish establish primary schooling accessible to all, irrespective of caste, creed, or gender. He organized teacher remuneration and oversight, creating a parish-based network that became foundational to Kerala's later achievements in literacy.

== Social and charitable reforms ==
In 1866, he instituted the Pidiyari (“a handful of rice”) system, encouraging households to set aside rice daily for charity; the collections were auctioned weekly to fund schools, convent works, and aid for the poor. He promoted smallpox vaccination, catechism classes, retreats, and devotional practices such as 40-hour Eucharistic adoration.

== Contributions to religious life ==
Baccinelli reformed priestly formation by replacing the traditional Malpanate with centralized seminary education at Varapuzha and later Puthenpally, developments that contributed to the establishment of the Pontifical Seminary at Alwaye. He supported and recognized local congregations: formal recognition of the Syrian Tertiary Carmelite community (later the Carmelites of Mary Immaculate, CMI) and, in 1866, the founding of the Third Order of Discalced Carmelites (TOCD) for women under Mother Eliswa Vakayil, which influenced the emergence of the Congregation of the Mother of Carmel (CMC) and the Congregation of Teresian Carmelites (CTC). He also backed convent schools, boarding houses for girls, and early medical initiatives including a mission hospital at Koonammavu (1859).

== Death and legacy ==
Baccinelli died on 5 September 1868 at Varapuzha and was buried at Mount Carmel St. Joseph's Monastery Church. Contemporaries, including Saint Kuriakose Elias Chavara, praised his leadership; later assessments credit his parish-school system, women's education initiatives, charitable reforms, and formation policies with shaping Kerala's social transformation.

== See also ==
- Archdiocese of Verapoly
- Mother Eliswa Vakayil
- Kuriakose Elias Chavara
- Carmelites of Mary Immaculate
- Congregation of the Mother of Carmel
