= Eliswa Vakayil =

Indian Catholic religious sister (1831–1913)

Blessed Eliswa Vakayil
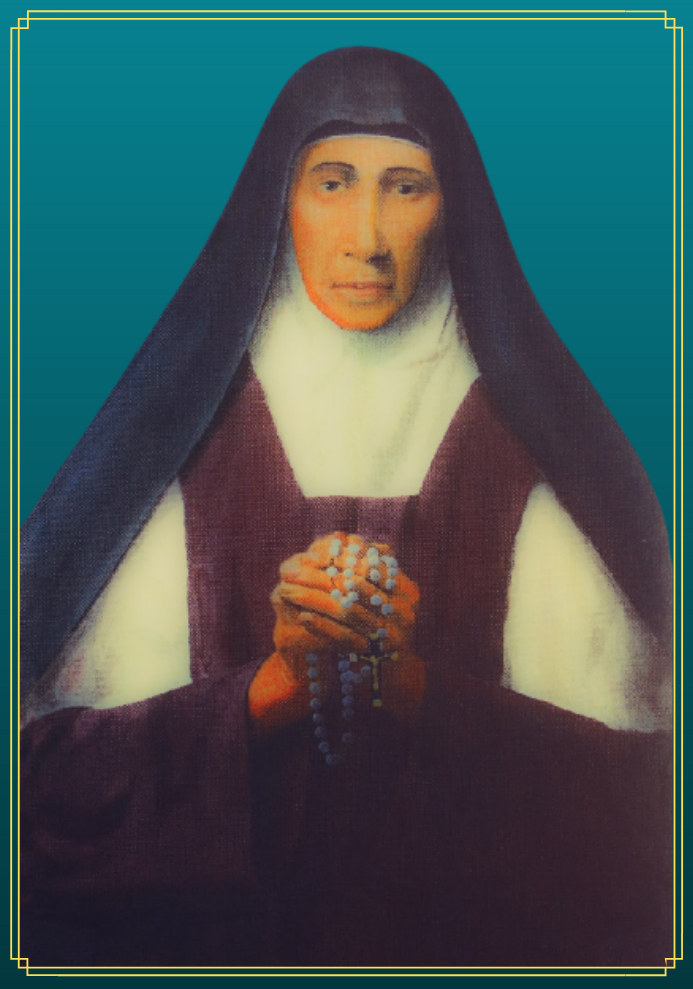
- Born: 15 October 1831; Ochanthuruth, Ernakulam, Kerala, India
- Died: 18 July 1913 (aged 81); Varapuzha, Ernakulam, Kerala, India

Eliswa Vakayil, religious name Eliswa of the Blessed Virgin Mary, (15 October 1831 – 18 July 1913) was a religious sister from Kerala. Eliswa Vakayil, religious name Eliswa of the Blessed Virgin Mary, (15 October 1831 – 18 July 1913) was a religious sister from Kerala. She was the founder of the first indigenous Carmelite community for women in India, the Third Order of the Discalced Carmelites (TOCD), which later became the Teresian Carmelite Sisters and the Congregation of the Mother of Carmel (CMC). Pope Francis declared her venerable in 2023, and she was beatified on 8 November 2025, at the National Shrine Basilica of Our Lady of Ransom in Vallarpadam.. Pope Francis declared her venerable in 2023, and she was beatified on 8 November 2025, at the National Shrine Basilica of Our Lady of Ransom in Vallarpadam.

== Early life and vocation ==
Eliswa Vakayil was born on 15 October 1831, in the village of Ochanthuruth, part of the Cruz Milagres parish in Ernakulam, Kerala. She was the eldest of eight children born to Thomman and Thanda, a couple from the Vyppissery family. The Vyppissery were a wealthy and notable "Capithan" family who ensured Vakayil received an education, which was uncommon for Catholic girls in the region at the time.

At the age of 16, in 1847, Vakayil entered into an arranged marriage with Vareethu Vakayil. The couple had a daughter, Anna, who was born on 21 April 1850. Her husband died a year and a half later, leaving her a widow at the age of 20 with an 18-month-old child. Despite being encouraged to remarry, Vakayil chose a life of silent prayer and dedicated service. She spent over a decade in a simple hut constructed near her family home, dedicated to prayer and charity. In 1862, she confided her desire to consecrate her life to God to the Italian Discalced Carmelite missionary Leopold Beccaro. He served as her spiritual director and helped her in establishing the congregation.

== Foundation of the Teresian Carmelite Sisters ==
Vakayil having been joined by her daughter, Anna, and her younger sister, Thresia, initiated the religious life. Their first convent was a simple bamboo-mat hut built on Vakayil's property in Koonammavu, where they began to follow the rule of the Third Order of Our Lady of Mount Carmel. On 12 February 1866, Archbishop Bernardine Baccinelli, the then Vicar Apostolic of Verapoly, recognized the congregation by issuing the Documentum erectionis. As the community grew, a more permanent convent building was made and blessed in March 1867. The first sisters made their religious vows in July 1868. Vakayil's inclusive vision later led her to admit sisters of the Syro-Malabar Rite into the congregation.

== Legacy ==
Following the division of rites in Malabar in 1887, an order from the Holy See on 17 September 1890 required the Latin sisters, including Vakayil, to leave the convent and its property to the Syrian sisters (who later formed the Congregation of the Mother of Carmel, CMC). The Latin branch re-established itself at St. Joseph's Convent in Varapuzha (Verapoly) on 11 November 1890, and became the Congregation of Teresian Carmelites (CTC). Vakayil served as the first novice mistress of the canonical novitiate erected there in 1892.

The original congregation thus evolved into two independent ones: the Congregation of Teresian Carmelites (CTC) of the Latin Rite, and the Congregation of the Mother of Carmel (CMC) of the Syro-Malabar Rite.

Vakayil's foundational work endures in these two independent congregations, which continue to uphold her spiritual and social legacy. Her personal motto, "God alone suffices" mirrored that of St. Teresa of Ávila.

== Beatification process ==
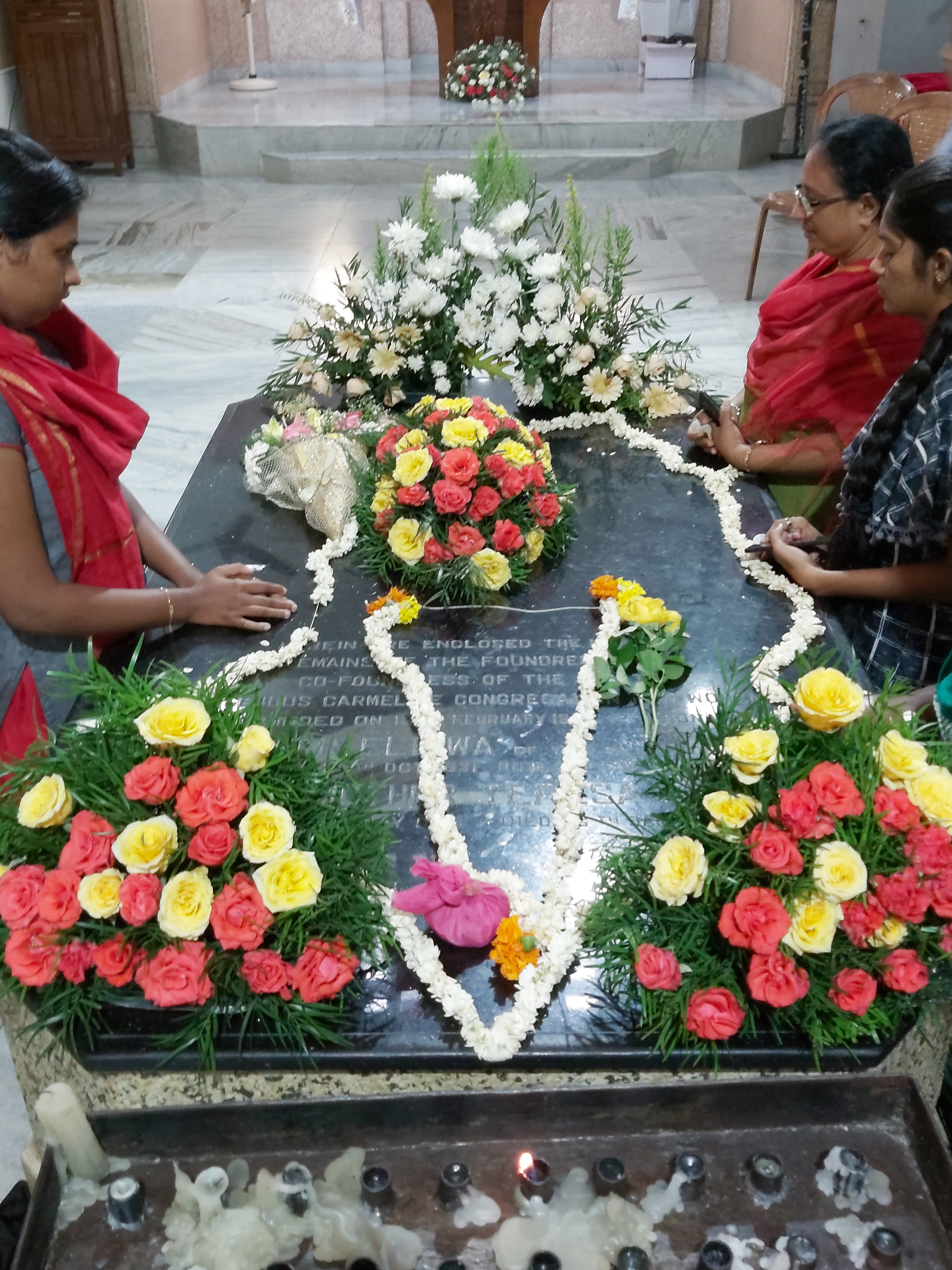
Tomb of venerable Eliswa Vakayil

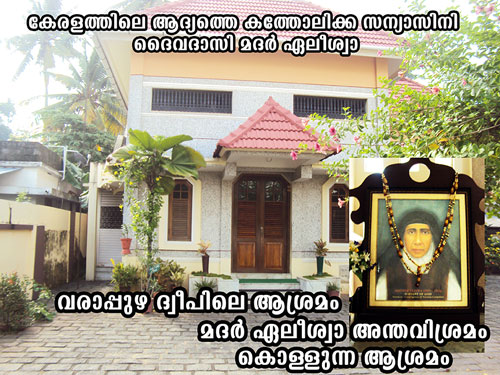
Entrance to the tomb chapel

Vakayil died on 18 July 1913, at the age of 81. Her remains were initially interred in front of the Basilica of Our Lady of Mount Carmel and Saint Joseph in Varapuzha (Verapoly). They were later transferred to a tomb chapel, the Smruthi Mandhiram, at St. Joseph's Convent in Varapuzha. The tomb has since become a site of pilgrimage for the faithful.

Vakayil's beatification process was opened in 2008, and she was declared a Servant of God. The diocesan inquiry concluded on 7 April 2017. On 8 November 2023, Pope Francis declared her to be venerable. On 14 April 2025, Francis recognized a miracle attributed to Vakayil's intercession. Eliswa Vakayil was beatified at the National Shrine Basilica of Our Lady of Ransom in Vallarpadam on 8 November 2025 by Cardinal Sebastian Francis on behalf of Pope Leo XIV.
