= Indian Institute of Infrastructure and Construction =

Public education institution in Chavara, India

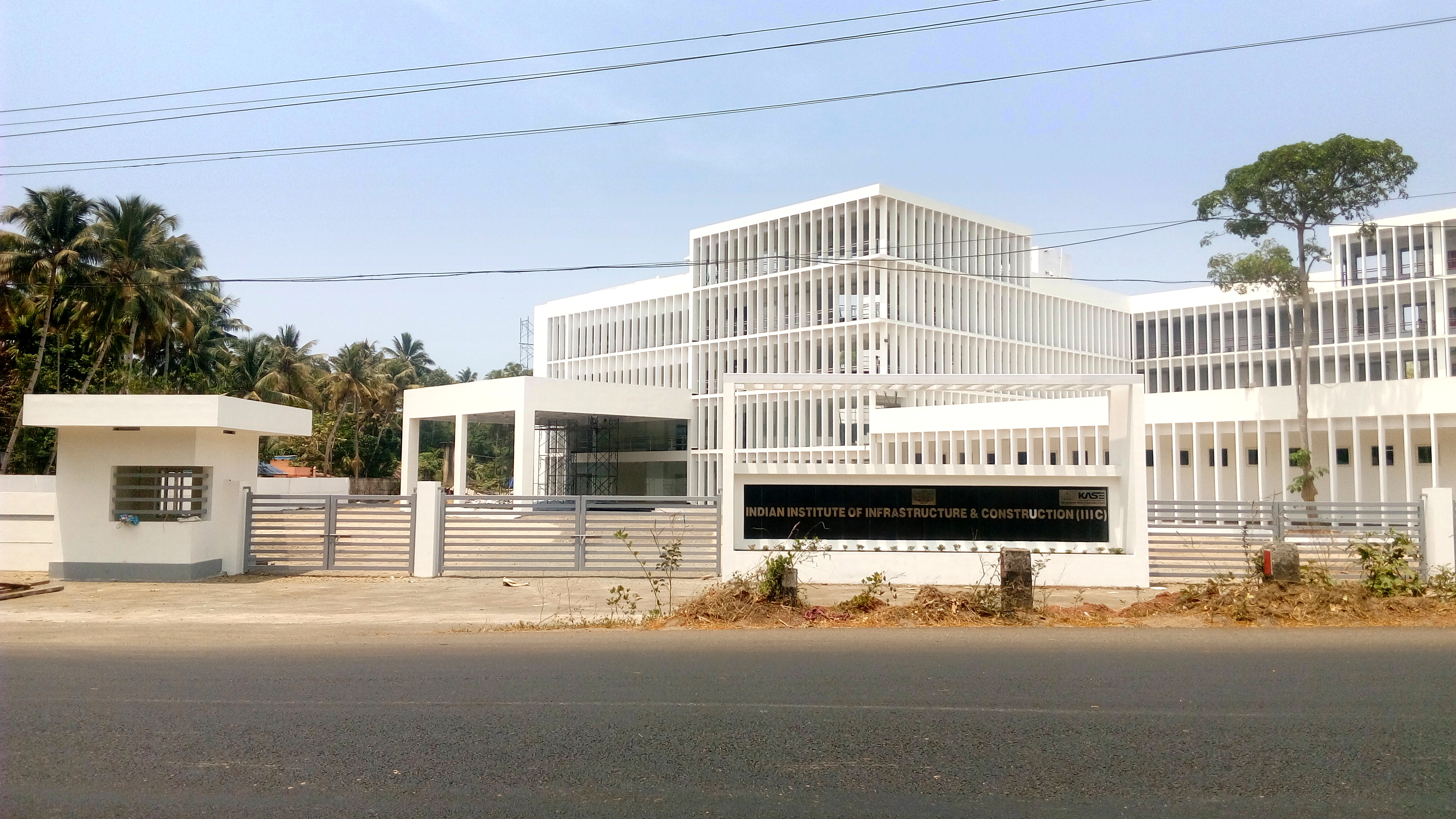
- Type: Public educational institution
- Established: 23 July 2018; 8 years ago
- Chairman: Shri. Rameshan Paleri
- Director: Dr. B Sunil Kumar
- Students: 2000 students (Expecting)
- Location: chavara, Kollam, Kerala, India; 8.97068°N 76.53245°E
- Campus: Suburban, 9.02 acres
- Website: www.iiic.ac.in

The Indian Institute of Infrastructure and Construction Kollam or IIIC-Kollam is a public institute situated at Chavara in Kollam, Kerala. The initiative has been undertaken by the Government of Kerala with the support of the Government of India. The academy is coming under the Kerala Academy for Skills Excellence (KASE) to support the skill development programmes for construction related occupations

== History ==
The construction academy was first proposed by the LDF ministry during 2008. They started the background works for the academy and named the project as Kerala Construction Academy, proposed at Chathannoor in Kollam district. When UDF came into power, they have shifted the project from Chathannoor to chavara and renamed as Indian Institute of Infrastructure and Construction.

== Campus ==
Logo of IIIC-Kollam

The institute is on a 9.02 acres (36,500 m^{2}) campus along the NH-66, near chavara in Kollam Metropolitan Area. KASE has developed a Master Plan and detailed design for the campus with 235,100 square feet (21,800 m^{2}) of facilities including an administrative block, training block, canteen, and substation. Foundation stone was laid by the then Chief Minister of Kerala Mr. Oommen Chandy on 15 March 2013. The campus was inaugurated for academic activities by the Hon. Chief Minister Shri. Pinarayi Vijayan in August 2018.

== Courses ==
During the initial phase, there will be three technician and managerial level courses along with a course in supervisory level. There will be an advanced certificate programme also in plumbing engineering. Candidates with SSLC, Plus Two, ITI, diploma, degree and B.Tech. qualification can join for the courses.

== Significance ==
Kerala state depends on migrant workers for the various jobs needed. The dependence on Migrant labourers in Kerala is found mainly in the field of construction. The city of Kollam and other places like Punalur, Paravur in Kollam district, Perumbavoor, Thrissur etc. are slowly becoming overwhelmed with a number of migrants from North India. The migrant labours in places like Kollam have started scoring top marks in literacy equivalent examination. So an institute for developing the unskilled domestic labours as well as migrant labourers has become an essential need in Kerala. The main aim behind this institute is to train masons to upgrade their skills and get a certification from the Britain-based organisation City and Guilds.

In May 2018, The Kerala Academy for Skills Excellence(KASE) decide to partner with The Uralungal Labour Contract Society Ltd(ULCCS) to collaborate in courses offered at IIIC-Kollam under KASE. An MoU in this regard is signed on 30 May in the presence of Labour and Excise Minister for Kerala, T. P. Ramakrishnan.

== Project details of IIIC-Kollam ==
- Total area - 9.02 acre
- Total built up space - 235102 square feet
- Blocks - Administrative Block, Training block, Canteen, Substation etc.
- Total estimated project cost - Rs. 100 Crores
- Main Building - 1.5 lakh square feet, 38 classrooms, 10 office rooms, canteen etc.
- Hostel Building - 35,000 square feet, 54 rooms, Canteen etc.

== Facilities ==
- Eco-friendly campus with the usage of bio-degradable materials.
- Plastic free campus from the inception itself.
- LED-based street and external lighting systems using photovoltaics
- 30% of the cooking gas requirements are satisfied through bio-gas plants
- Rainwater harvesting systems are installed to save water from wastage
- Residential campus with modern and homely hostels
- Sewage treatment plant
- Classrooms with multimedia facilities
- Canteen
- Central Library
- Language Lab
- Transportation facility
- Emergency medical care.
- Bank Counter & ATM
- Guest House.
- Staff Quarters
