= Education in Kollam district =

Overview of education in Kollam, Kerala, India

Kollam district, earlier called Quilon district, is one of the 14 districts of Kerala state, India. The district is representative of all the natural attributes of Kerala states, and is endowed with a long coastal region, a major sea port on the Arabian Sea, plains and the mountains, lakes, lagoons and Kerala Backwaters, forests and the farm land, and rivers and streams. The area had mercantile relationship with Phoenicians and the Romans.

There is a variety of education institutions within the Kollam district including: medical and engineering colleges, business management, architectural institutes and state institutes dealing with fashion, design, construction and marine studies. The Thangal Kunju Musaliar College of Engineering in Karikode is the first government aided engineering institution after India's independence and is the first of its kind in the state. Mount Carmel Anglo-Indian School and the Infant Jesus Anglo-Indian School are among the state's oldest prominent educational institutions, situated at Tangasseri.

There are several prominent arts and science, law, engineering and management education institutions situated at the heart of the city namely Fatima Mata National College, SN College, SN Law College, Bishop Jerome Institute. There are also 3 prominent medical institutions within the district; Government Medical College kollam in Parippally, Travancore Medical College Hospital in Mevaram and Azeezia Medical College in Meeyannoor that encompasses all medical teaching within the district.

Mount Carmel Anglo-Indian School and Infant Jesus Anglo-Indian School are two of the state's oldest famous educational schools, both located in Tangasseri. Amrita Vishwa Vidyapeetham operates schools of arts and sciences, ayurveda, biotechnology, business, engineering, and social work in Amritapuri, Kollam metropolitan area. Kendriya Vidyalaya is situated at Ramankulangara, Chinmaya Vidyalaya at Chandanathope, Jawahar Navodaya Vidyalaya at Kottarakkara. Within engineering institutions the Thangal Kunju Musaliar College of Engineering in Karikode is a government aided institution that was established after India's independence and is the first of its kind in the state.

The state owned institutions including the Indian Institute of Infrastructure and Construction in chavara, Institute of Fashion Technology Kerala, Kerala Maritime Institute and Kerala State Institute of Design [ currently range on the outskirts of Kollam City. Vocational training and skill development within Ayurveda Panchakarma Therapy, Spa Therapy, Cosmetology and Ayurvedic Massage provide diploma courses that enable participants to extend upon their knowledge associated with the disciplines.

Apart from colleges, there are a number of bank coaching centres in Kollam city. It's been categorised as India's hub for bank test coaching centres with approximately 40 such institutes. The student demographic for the centres range from a variety of Indian states including Tamil Nadu, Karnataka, Andhra Pradesh, Bihar and Madhya Pradesh.

== Professional Colleges ==
=== Engineering and Technology Colleges ===
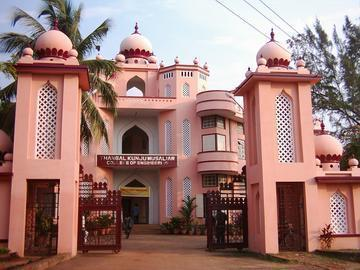
Entrance, TKMCE

- Thangal Kunju Musaliar College of Engineering, Kollam, Karikode (first government-aided engineering college of the state)
- College of Engineering, Karunagappally (first government engineering college in the district, under IHRD)

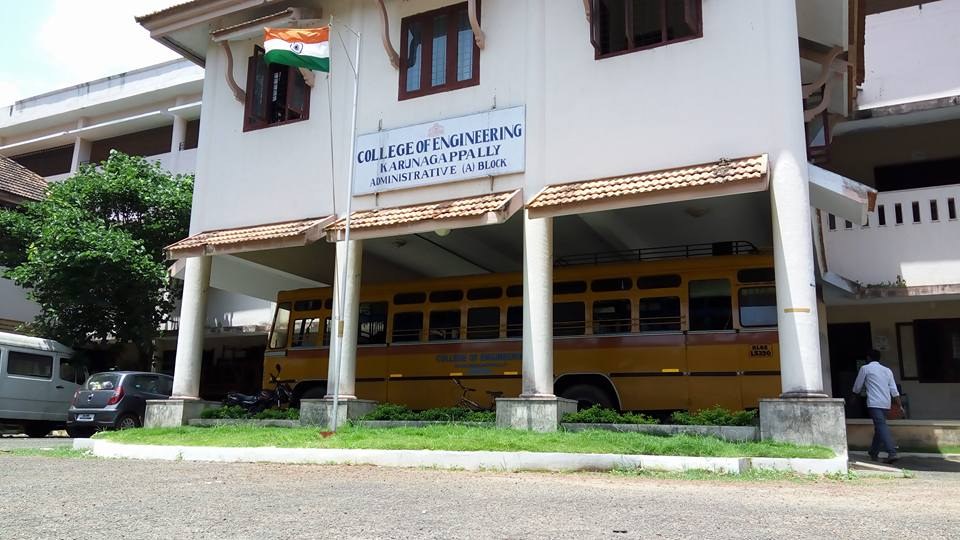
College of Engineering Karunagappally

- College of Engineering, Perumon
- College of Engineering, Kottarakkara
- College of Engineering, Pathanapuram

Private Self-Financing Engineering Colleges

- Basilous Mathew II College of Engineering, Sasthamcottah
- Bishop Jerome College of Engineering and Technology, Kollam
- Hindustan College of Engineering, Arippa, Kulathuppuzha
- MES Institute of Technology And Management, Chathannoor
- SHM Engineering College, Kadakkal
- TKM Institute of Technology, Karuvelil
- Travancore Engineering College, Roadvila, Oyoor
- UKF College of Engineering and Technology, Meenambalam
- Younus College of Engineering and Technology, Pallimukku
- Younus College of Engineering for Women, Kottarakkara, Kollam
- Younus Institute of Technology, Kannanalloor
- Pinnacle College of Engineering, Anchal, Kollam
- Amrita Institute of Technology and Science, Vallikavu, Clappana, Kollam

=== Medical Institutions ===
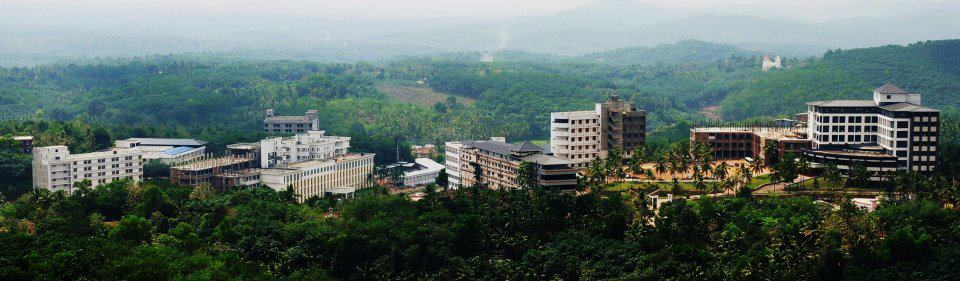
Azeezia Institute of Medical Science and Research, Meeyannoor, Kollam

- Azeezia Medical College, Meeyannoor
- Travancore Medical College, Medicity, Kollam
- Government Medical College, Kollam and ESIC Hospital, Parippally, Kollam
- Sree Narayana Institute of Ayurvedic Studies and Research, Karimpinpuzha, Puthoor, Kollam
- Amrita Ayurveda Medical College, Karunagappally, Kollam

=== Business and Management Institutes ===
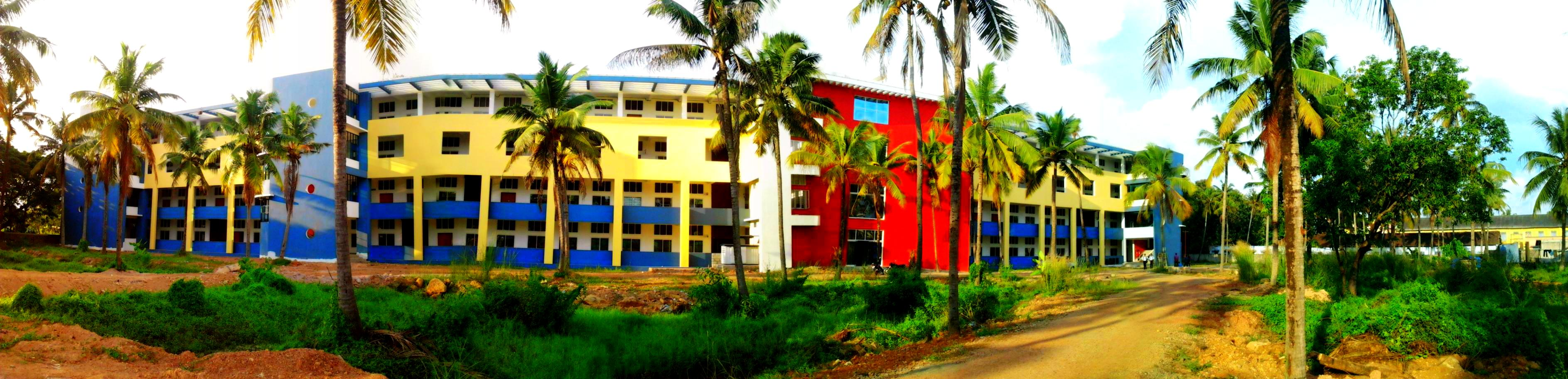
Panoramic view of Bishop Jerome Group of Institutions, Kollam

- TKM Institute of Management, Kollam
- Member Sree Narayana Pillai Institute of Management and Technology, Mukundapuram, Chavara, Kollam
- Bishop Jerome School of Management, Kollam
- Institute of Management-Kerala, Kollam
- Institute of Management-Kerala, Kundara
- Travancore Business Academy, Vadakkevila, Kollam
- Gurudev Institute of Management Studies (GIMS), Kadakkal
- Sankar Institute of Science, Technology and Management, Chathannoor
- Horizon Educational Foundation, Kollam
- Quilon Institute of Technology for Women, Kollam

=== Architecture Colleges ===
- Thangal Kunju Musaliar College of Engineering, Kollam, Karikode
- Nizar Rahim and Mark School of Architecture, Madannada, Kollam
- Bishop Jerome Institute, Karbala, Kollam

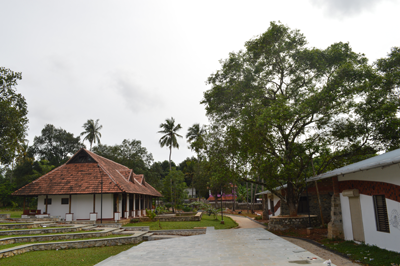
A view of Kerala State Institute of Design campus

=== Design Institutes ===
- Creative Institute of Fashion Technology, Kottiyam
- Creative Institute of Fashion Technology, Kottarakkara
- Venad Technical College, Kottarakkara
- Kerala State Institute of Design

=== Law Colleges ===
- Sree Narayana Guru College of Legal Studies, Kollam
- NSS Law College, Kottiyam

=== Nursing Colleges ===
- Bishop Benziger College of Nursing, Kollam
- Upasana College of Nursing, Kollam
- Travancore College of Nursing, Kollam
- Holy Cross College of Nursing, Kottiyam
- Azeezia Nursing College, Meeyannoor, Kollam
- Mercy College of Nursing, Kottarakkara, Kollam
- Vijaya College of Nursing, Kottarakkara, Kollam
- Vellapalli Natesan Shashtiabdapoorthi Smaraka College of Nursing, Kollam
- St. Joseph's College of Nursing, Kollam
- Royal College of Nursing, Chathannoor

=== Polytechnic Colleges ===
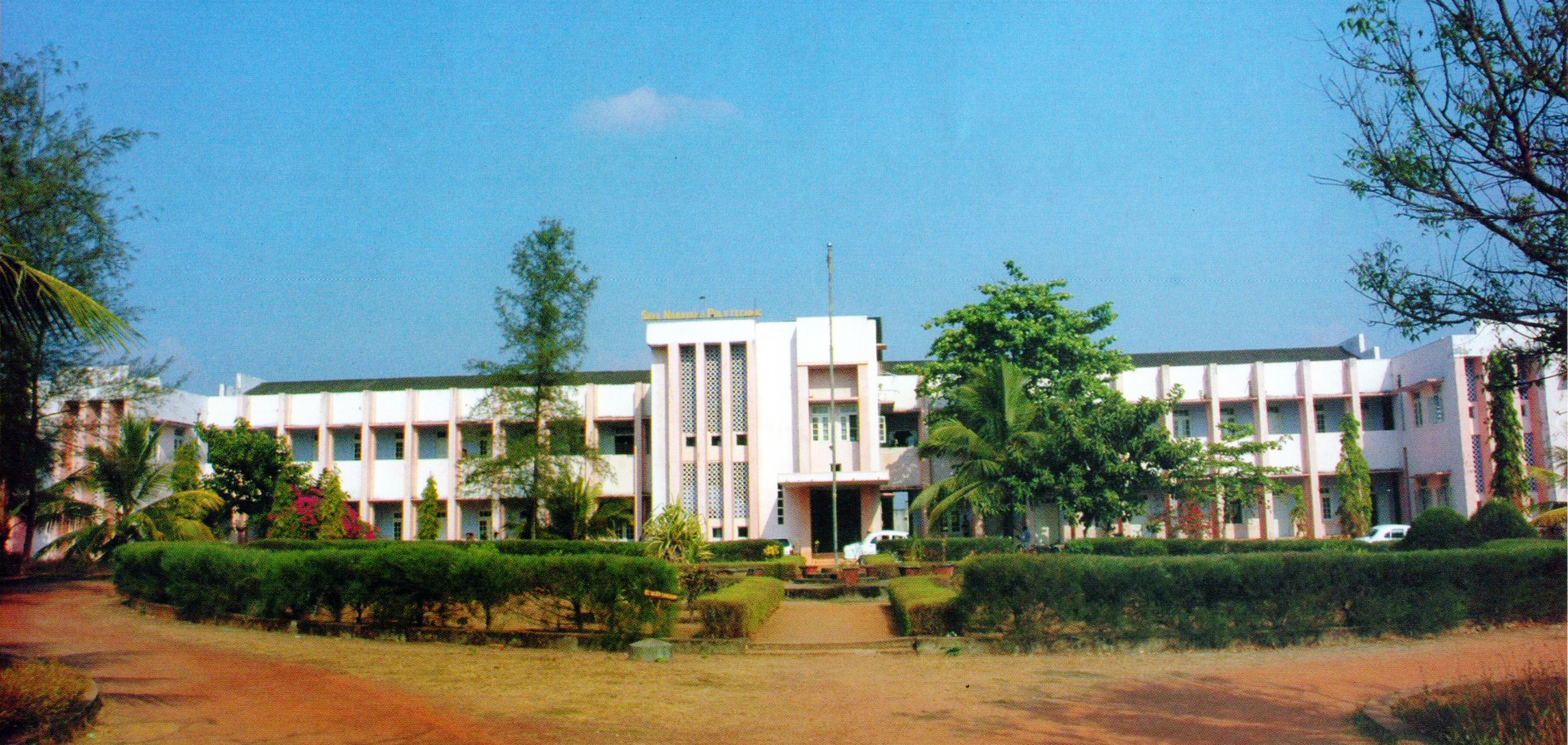
SN Polytechnic College (S.N.P.T.C) Kottiyam in 2008

- Sree Narayana Polytechnic College, Kottiyam
- Government Polytechnic College, Punalur
- Government Polytechnic College, Ezhukone
- Model Polytechnic College, Karunagappally, Kollam

=== Fashion Technology Colleges ===
- Creative Institute of Fashion Technology, Kottiyam
- Creative Institute of Fashion Technology, Kottarakkara
- Venad Technical College, Kottarakkara
- Apparel Training and Design Center (ATDC Vocational College)
- Institute of Fashion Technology Kerala (IFTK), Vellimon, Kollam

=== MCA Colleges ===
- Mar Baselios Institute of Technology, Anchal
- Marthoma College of Science and Technology, Ayur
- Sree Narayana Institute of Technology, Vadakkevila, Kollam

=== Training and BEd Centres ===
- Badhiriya BEd. Training College
- Tax Study Vocational Training Centre, Kottarakkara
- Jamia Training College
- Valiyam Memorial College of Teacher Education
- Haneefa Kunju Memorial College of Education
- Sri Vidyadhiraja Model College of Teacher Education
- Millath College of Teacher Education, Sooranadu
- College of Teacher Education, Arkannoor, Ayur
- Sabarigiri College of Education, Anchal
- Fathima Memorial Training College, Mylapore
- Mannam Foundation Centre For Education Technology, Kollam
- Rama Vilasom Training College, Valakom
- Mannam Memorial Training College, Punalur
- Baselios Marthoma Mathews II Training College
- Fathima Memorial Training College, Pallimukku
- Karmela Rani Training College, Kollam
- Mount Tabor Training College, Pathanapuram
- Manjappara Educational And Charitable Trust BEd College

== Arts and Science Colleges ==
- Sree Narayana College for Women, Kollam
- Fatima Mata National College, Kollam
- MMNSS College Kottiyam
- TKM College of Arts and Science, Kollam
- Sree Sankara Sanskrit Vithyapeedom College Edakkidom
- Devaswom Board College, Sasthamcotta
- IHRD College of Applied Science, Kundara
- Baby John Memorial Government College, Chavara
- St. John's College, Anchal
- St. Stephen's College, Pathanapuram
- St. Gregorios College, Kottarakkara
- NSS College, Nilamel
- Sree Narayana College, Punalur
- Sree Narayana College, Chathannur
- Sree Vidyadhiraja College of Arts and Science
- PMSA Pookoya Thangal Memorial Arts and Science College, Kadakkal

== List of Schools ==
This is a list of public and private educational institutions in the Kollam district of Kerala, India.

== Department of Higher Education Schools ==
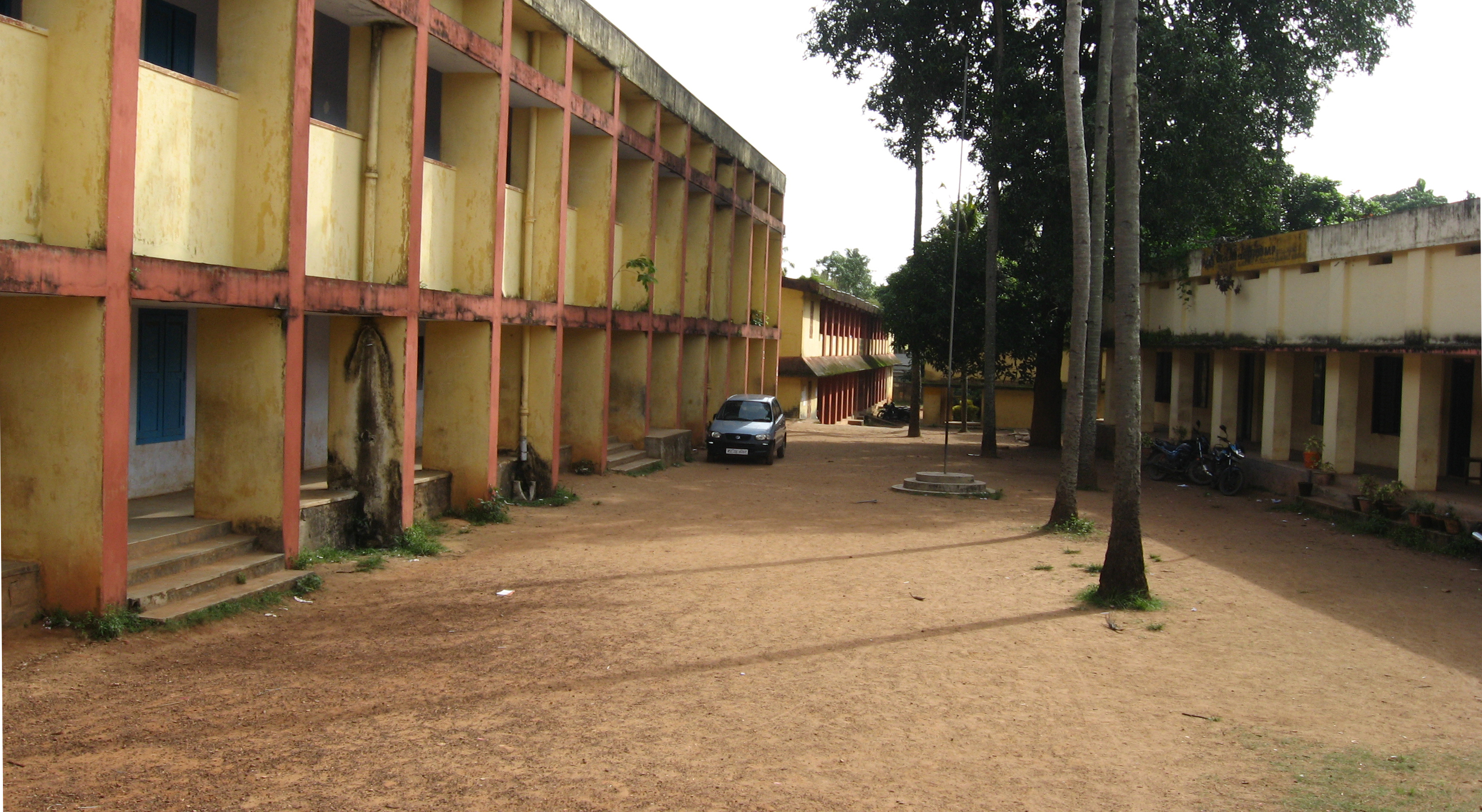
Meenakshi Vilasam Government Vocational Higher Secondary School, covering two acres

Kollam has a total of 129 educational institutions under the Department of Higher Education. The Meenakshi Vilasam Government Vocational Higher Secondary School (M.V.G.V.H.S.S.) is one of the oldest schools in the district; over 1,000 students study there. B J S M Madathil Vocational Higher Secondary School tops the list of schools in the district in students strength, with about 2700 students studying there.

=== Higher secondary schools under DHSE ===
- Govt. BHSS, Chavara, Kollam
- Ayyankoyikkal HSS, Chavara, Mukundapuram, Kollam
- Govt. HSS, Karunagappally, Kollam
- Govt. Model Boys HSS, thevally, Kollam
- Govt. Boys HSS, Kottarakkara, Kollam
- Govt. HSS, Kulasekharapuram, Kollam
- Govt. HSS, Kuzhimathikad, Kollam
- Govt. HSS, Vellamanal, Kollam
- Govt Higher Secondary School, Bhoothakkulam
- Govt. HSS, Punalur, Kollam
- Govt. HSS, Valathungal, Kollam
- Govt. HSS, Vayala, Kollam
- Govt. HSS, Ottakkal, Kollam
- Govt. HSS, Karukone, Kollam
- Govt. HSS, West Kallada, Kollam
- Govt. HSS, Vallikeezhu, Kollam
- Govt. HSS, Panmanamanayil, Kollam
- Govt. HSS, Anjalummoodu, Kollam
- Govt. HSS, Mangad, Kollam
- Govt. HSS, Kummil, Kadakkal, Kollam
- Govt. Fisheries HSS, Kuzhithura, Alappat, Kollam
- Govt. HSS, Sooraanad, Kollam
- Govt. MG HSS, Chadayamangalam, Kollam
- Govt. HSS, Anchal West, Kollam
- Govt. HSS, Sasthamkotta, Kollam
- Govt. HSS, Pallimon, Kollam
- Govt. VHSS, Pattazhi, Kollam
- Mohammeden Govt. HSS, Edathara, Kollam
- Govt. HSS, Kulathupuzha, Kollam
- Govt. Model HSS, Vettikkavala, Kollam
- Govt. Girls HSS, Thazhava, Kollam
- Govt. HSS, Chathannoor, Kollam
- Govt. HSS, Puthur, Kollam
- Govt. HSS, Thekkumbhagam, Paravur
- Guhanandapuram HSS, Chavara South, Kollam
- Amrutha Sanskrit HSS, Parippally, Kollam
- Milade Sherif HSS, Mynagappally, Kollam
- Odanavattom Girls HSS, Odanavattom, Kollam
- V V HSS, poredam, Kollam
- S.N. HSS, chithara, Kadakkal, Kollam
- St. Gregorious HSS, Kottarakkara, Kollam
- S.M HSS, Kottara, Kollam
- S.M HSS, Patharam, Kollam
- B.J.S.M Madathil HSS, Thazhava, Kollam
- S.V HSS, Clappana, Kollam
- St. Antony's HSS, Kanjirakode, Kollam
- S.N.D.P.Y HSS, Neeravil, Kollam
- M.S.M HSS, Chathinamkulam, Kollam
- N.S.S HSS, Chathannoor, Kollam
- S.N.S.M HSS, Elampalloor, Kollam
- M.K.L.M. HSS, Kannanalloor, Kollam
- CP HSS, Kuttikkadu, Kadakkal, Kollam
- Chempakassery HSS, Poothakulam, Kollam
- Irumpanangadu HSS, Irumpanangadu, Kollam
- Kristraj HSS, Kollam
- St. Stephen's HSS, Pathanapuram, Kollam
- E V HSS, Neduvathur, Kollam
- Dr CT Eapen Memorial HSS, Sasthamcotta, Kollam
- Ezhippuram HSS, Parippalli, Kollam
- Mayyanadu HSS, Mayyanadu, Kollam
- Vimala Hridaya Girls HSS, Kollam
- AKM HSS, Mailapur, Eravipuram, Kollam
- Thadikad HSS, Thadikad, Anchal, Kollam
- St. Goretti HSS, Punalur, Kollam
- Poovathoor HSS, Kottarakkara, Kollam
- St. Alosious HSS, Kollam
- N S S HSS, Prakkulam, Kollam
- Sivaram N S S HSS, Karikode, Kollam
- V.G.S.S Ambikodayam HSS, Kunnathoor East P.O, Kollam
- HSS, for Boys, Punalur, Kollam
- C V K M HSS, East Kallada, Kollam
- K P M E M HSS, Cheriyavelinelloor, Kollam
- M M HSS, Uppodu, East Kallada, Kollam
- B V HSS, Karunagappally, Kollam
- M M HSS, Nilamel, Kollam
- T K M HSS, Karikkode, Kollam
- Sree Narayana Trust HSS, Kollam
- S V R VHSS, Vendar, Kollam
- C S I Vocational HS&HSS, for Deaf, Valakom, Kollam
- St. Joseph's Convent HSS, Kollam
- St. Jude's HSS, Alumoodu, Mukhathala, Kollam
- St. Mary's HSS, Kizhakkekara, Kollam
- Vellimon HSS, Vellimon, Kollam
- VHSS, Manjappara, Kollam
- John F Kennady M HSS, Karunagappally, Kollam
- Lourd Matha HSS, Kovilthottam, Kollam
- Nehru Memorial HSS, Kaithakuzhy, Kollam
- Mount Carmel E M HSS, Mathilakom, Kollam
- St. John's HSS, Karuvelil, Ezhukone, Kollam
- S D A HSS, Kottarakkara, Kollam
- Sabarigiri HSS, Anchal, Kollam
- Mount Tabore HSS, Pathanapuram, Kollam
- R V HSS, Valakom, Kollam
- T V T M HSS, Veliyam, Kollam
- VHSS, Vayanakom, Kollam
- M A E M HSS, Karikkodu, Kollam
- Jawahar HSS, Ayur, Kollam
- A K M V HSS, Thadikkadu, Anchal, Kollam
- Govt. HSS, Koikkal, Kollam
- T K D M Govt. VHSS, Kadappakada, Kollam
- Govt. HSS, Peringalam, Kollam
- Govt. HSS, Ashtamudi, Kundara, Kollam
- Govt. VHSS, Punnala, Kollam
- Govt. HSS, Chithara, Kadakkal, Kollam
- Govt. HSS, Muttara, Kottarakkara, Kollam
- Govt. HSS, Nedungolam, Paravur
- Govt. HSS, Oachira, Kollam
- Govt. HSS, Yeroor, Kollam
- Govt. HSS, Thevannoor, Kollam
- Govt. HSS, Thodiyoor, Kollam
- Govt. HSS, Kulakkada, Kottarakkara, Kollam
- Govt. HSS, Poruvazhy, Kunnathoor, Kollam
- Govt. VHSS, Chingeli, Kadakkal, Kollam
- Vakkanad Govt. HSS, Kottarakkara, Kollam
- Govt. HSS, Perinad, Kollam
- Govt.HSS, Anchal East, Kollam
- Sadanandapuram Govt. HSS, Kollam
- Govt. HSS, Quilon West, Kollam
- S N Trust HSS, Chathannoor, Kollam
- S N Trust HSS, Punalur, Kollam
- Technical HSS, Chadayamangalam, Kollam.
- D.V.V. HSS, Thalavoor, Pathanapuram, Kollam
- St. Thomas HSS, Punalur, Kollam
- M E S English Medium HSS, Panmanam, Kollam
- Sreeniketan HSS, Chathannoor, Kollam
- Sree Narayana E M HSS, Valiyakulangara, Oachira, Kollam
- Vivekananda HSS, Changankulangara, Kollam
- N.G.P.M. HSS, Venchempu, Punalur
- T C N M GHSS, Nedumpara
- Govt.VHSS, Kottankulangara
- G P VHSS, Perumkulam
- Govt.A S HSS, Puthanthura
- M G D HSS for Boys, Kundara
- M A M HSS, Chengamanadu
- M T D M HSS, Malur
- K N N M VHSS, Pavithreswaram
- Devi Vilasom VHSS, Thalavoor
- M T HSS Valakam, Kottarakkara
- M M HSS, Vilakkudy
- Adichanalloor Panchayath HSS, Adichanalloor
- H.K.M HSS, Kallukuzhi, Umayanalloor, Kollam
- The King's School, Kottiyam, Kollam

=== Institutions under Directorate of VHSE ===
- Govt. VHSS for Boys, Kottarakkara
- Govt. VHSS, Anchal East
- Govt. VHSS, Punnala
- Govt. VHSS for Girls, Kottarakkara
- Govt. VHSS, Cheriazheekal
- Technical High School, Ezhukone
- Govt. VHSS, Muttara
- Govt. VHSS, Karunagappally
- Govt. VHSS for Boys, Kollam
- Govt. VHSS, Kulakkada
- Govt. VHSS, Pattazhi
- Govt. VHSS, Kottankulangara
- Govt. VHSS, Chathanoor
- Govt. VHSS, Eravipuram
- Meenakshi Vilasom Govt. VHSS, Peroor, Kollam
- Govt. VHSS, Kadakkal
- T.K.D.M Govt. VHSS, Uliyakovil
- Govt. VHSS for Girls, Valathungal
- Govt. VHSS, Achancoil
- Govt. RFTH School, Karunagapally
- Edamon VHSS, Edamon
- K.S.M VHSS, Edavattom
- St.John's VHSS, Ummannoor
- St. George VHSS, Chowalloor, Edakkidom
- VHSS, Odanavattom
- Manjappara VHSS
- Jayajyothi VHSS, Poruvazhi, Ambalathumbhagam
- R VHSS, Valakom
- V VHSS, Ayathil
- Sri Vidyadiraja Memorial Model VHSS, Vendar
- B.J.S.M Madathil VHSS, Thazava
- Thadikkad VHSS, Thadikkad, Pathanapuram
- Matha VHSS, Vilakkumpara
- Vivekananda VHSS, Chadayamangalam, Poredam
- VHSS, Arkannur
- K.N Nair Memorial VHSS, Pavithreswaram
- T.E.M VHSS, Mylode
- Sivavilasam VHSS, Thamarakudy
- D.V VHSS, Thalavur, Kottarakkara
- A.K.M VHSS, Thadikad
- K.P.S.P.M VHSS, East Kallada
- V.S VHSS, Ezhukone
- I.G.M VHSS, Manjakkala
- J.E. Kennedy Memorial VHSS, Karunagappally
- A.P.P.M VHSS, Avaneeswaram
- D. VHSS, Mylom
- VHSS, Vellimon
- St.Michael VHSS Kumbalam, Mulavana
- Kuzhikkal Edavaka VHSS, Pavithreswaram, Karupinpuzha
- Vayanakom VHSS, Oachira
- NS VHSS, Valacode, Punalur
- SK VHSS, Thrikkannamangal, Kottarakkara

== Schools affiliated to CBSE ==
- Kendriya Vidyalaya, Kollam.
- T.K.M. Centenary Public School, Kollam
- Sree Narayana Trust Central School, Kollam
- Sree Buddha Central School, Kurunagapally, Kollam
- K.N.S.M Sree narayana Central school kadaikodu Edakkidom
- National Public school, Thazhuthala, Mukhathala P.O, Kollam
- Lake Ford School, Kavanad, Kollam
- St. Mary's Residential Central School, Kavanad, Kollam
- B R Memorial Central School, Chethady, Kollam - Thirumangalam Highway, Chengamanadu
- A P R M Central School, Kizhukkumbagam, Chithara P.O, Kollam
- Sreeniketan Central School, Chathannoor Karamcodu P.O, Kollam
- Siddhartha Central School Pallimon, Kollam
- River De International School, Kulathupuzha, Kollam
- St. John's School, Anchal, Kollam
- Sree Narayana Central School, Nedungolam, Paravur
- St. George central School, Anchal, Kollam
- Nehru Memorial Model School, Kadakkal, Kollam
- Vimala Central School, Chathannoor, Kollam
- Toc H Residential Public School, Punalur, Kollam
- City Central School, Uliyakovil, Kollam
- Sabarigiri School Punalur, Kollam
- Mar Baselios School Maruthamonpally, Pooyappally, Kollam
- The Oxford School Village, Thazhuthala, Umayannalloor P.O, Kollam
- Chinmaya Vidyalaya, Chanthanathope, Kollam, Kerala
- Amrita Vidyalayam, Puthiyakavu, Karunagappally, Kollam
- Navdeep Public School, Vettilathazham, Decent Jn P.O, Kollam
- Sree Narayana Central School, Karunagappally, Kollam
- St. Gregorious Central School, Karunagappally, Kollam
- Divine Public School, Puthoor, Kollam
- Jawahar Navodaya Vidyalaya, Kottarakara, Kollam
- Aiswarya Public School, Kalakkode, Paravur
- St.Jude.Central School, Mukhathala, Kollam
- Fathima Public School, Punalur
- Travancore Devaswom Board central school, vettikavala)
- Sabarigiri English School, Anchal, Kollam
- Delhi Public School Kollam (DPS Kollam)
- Sri Sri Academy, Ezhukone ( SSA, Kollam )

== Schools affiliated to ICSE ==
- Amrita Vidyalayam
- Auxilium English Medium School
- Holy Trinity Anglo - Indian School
- Infant Jesus School Kollam
- Maria Agnes English Medium Convent School
- Mary Giri Vidya Mandir
- Mount Carmel Convent Anglo-Indian Girls High School
- Preshithamatha School
- St. Charles Borromeo Convent School, Chittayam
- St. Charles Borromeo Convent School, Thrikkannapuram
- St. John's Residential School
- St. Joseph's Convent School
- St. Joseph's Convent School and Junior College, Edamon
- St. Joseph International Academy
- St. Mary's Residential School
- St. Vincent's Convent School
- Trinity Lyceum School, Kollam
- Vimala Hridaya School

== Schools affiliated to IGCSE (Cambridge) ==
- The King's School, Kottiyam, Kollam

== Education in Kottarakkara ==
=== Schools ===
- Creative institute of fashion technology, Kottarakkara.
- Venad technical college, Kottarakkara.
- Mar Baselios English Medium School, Kottapuram,
- Sri Vidyadhiraja Memorial Model HSS, Vendar, Kottarakara.
- Govt. Boys' Higher Secondary School, Kottarakara,
- St. Gregorios High School, College Junction, Kottarakara,
- St. Gregorios Higher Secondary School, College Junction, Kottarakara
- Marthoma Girls' Higher Secondary School, Kottarakara
- St.Mary's HS, Kizhekketheruvu
- Mar Baselious English Medium School, Kottapuram
- Town UP school, Kottarakara
- MAMHS-Chengamanadu,
- MTMM LPS-Chengamanadu,
- Chethady UPS-Chengamanadu,
- BRM Central School -Chengamanadu,
- MGM Residential Public School -Mylom, Kottarakara,
- Govt. Model Higher Secondary School, Vettikavala.
- Carmel Residential Senior Secondary School, Kadalavila, Nellikunnam P.O.,
- KNNMVHSS, Pavithreswaram
- K .N .Sathyapalan Memorial Central school Edakkidom ഇടയ്ക്കിടം
- Divine Public School, Puthoor
- Easwara Vilasom Higher Secondary School, Neduvathoor
- Siddhartha Central School, Puthoor
- S K V V H S S, Thrikkannamangal
- Sreenarayana Guru Senior Secondary School, Ezhukone
- Mar Ivanios Bethany Secondary School, Kalayapuram
- MSCLPS, Neeleswaram
- DVUPS, Neduvathoor
- WLPS, Ambalappuram
- Veluthampi Memorial High School, Ambalappuram
- DVUPS, Annoor
- WLPS, Anakottoor
- Govt. HSS, Kaniyapoika, Puthoor
- St. George English Medium School, Puthoor
- Little Flower LPS, Kallumpuram, Puthoor
- Junior Technical School, Irumpanangadu
- S.V.V.H.S.S, Thamarakudy
- Seventhday Adventist Higher Secondary School, Karickom
- Sadanandapuram Govt. Higher Secondary School
- Jawahar Navodaya Vidyalaya, Kottarakkara

=== Colleges ===
- St. Gregorios College
- University Institute of Technology (UIT)
- IHRD College of Engineering, Thrikkannamangal
- Mercy college of Nursing, Valakom
- Vijaya Nursing College
- Sree Sankara Sanskrit Vidhyapeedom, Edakkidam (ഇടയ്ക്കിടം)

== See also ==
- List of colleges affiliated to University of Kerala
- List of colleges affiliated with Cochin University of Science and Technology
- List of Engineering Colleges in Kerala
- List of Medical Colleges in Kerala
- List of Kollam District Schools
