= List of schools in Kollam district =

This is a list of public and private educational institutions in the Kollam district of Kerala, India.

== Department of Higher Education Schools ==
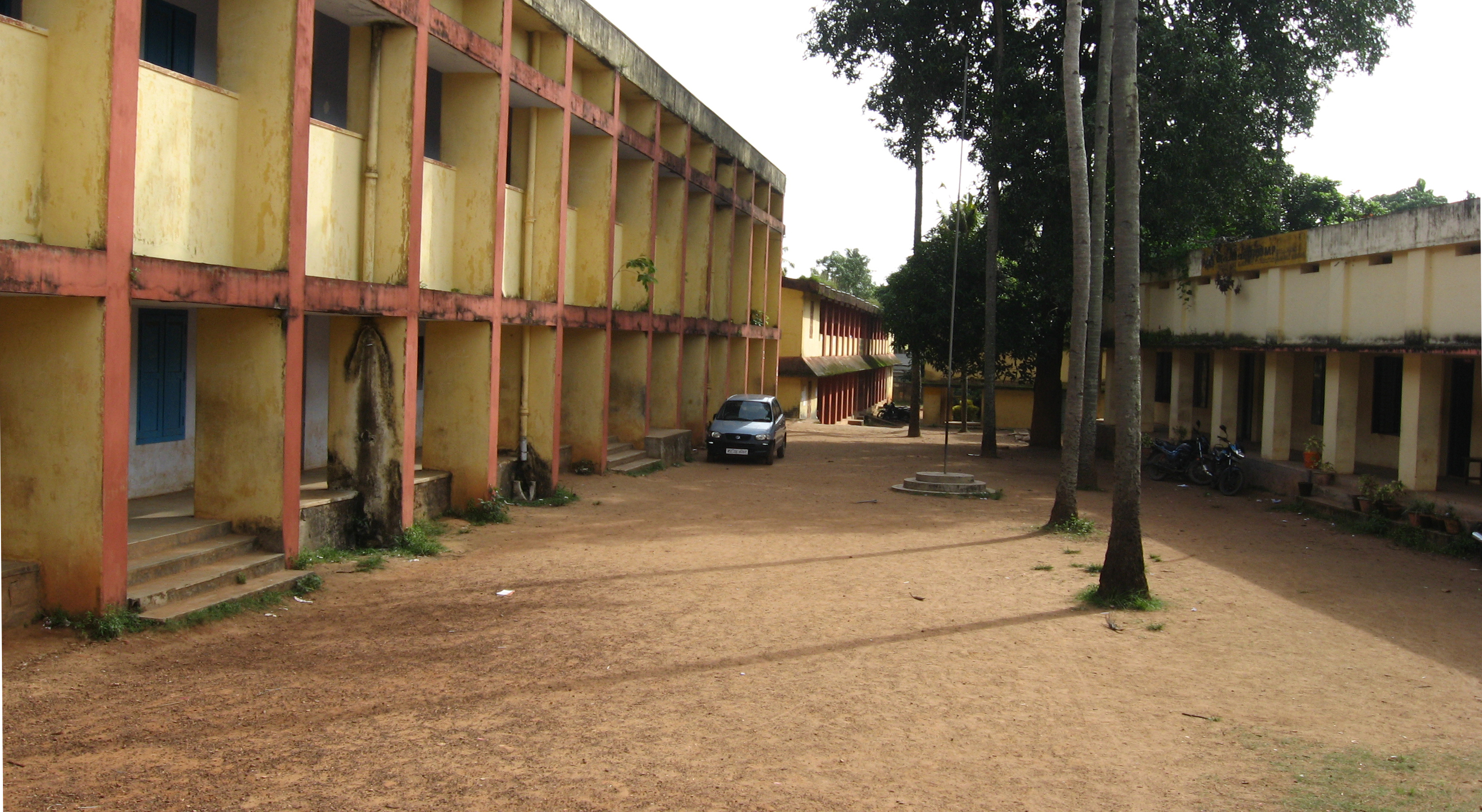
Meenakshi Vilasam Government Vocational Higher Secondary School, covering two acres

=== Higher secondary schools under DHSE ===
There are numerous schools under the Department of Higher Secondary Education (DHSE). In Kerala, the DHSE is run through the government of Kerala. Hence, it is classified as a public educational institution. This provides reasoning for the large quantity of government run schools included in the list below.

- Govt. BHSS, Chavara
- Ayyankoyikkal HSS, Koivila P.O
- Govt. HSS, Karunagappally
- Govt. Model Boys HSS, thevally
- Govt. Boys HSS, Kottarakkara
- Govt. HSS, Kulasekharapuram
- Govt. HSS, Kuzhimathikad
- Govt. HSS, Vellamanal
- Govt Higher Secondary School, Bhoothakkulam
- Govt. HSS, Punalur
- Govt. HSS, Valathungal
- Govt. HSS, Vayala
- Govt. HSS, Ottakkal
- Govt. HSS, Karukone
- Govt. HSS, West Kallada
- Govt. HSS, Vallikeezhu
- Govt. HSS, Panmanamanayil
- Govt. HSS, Anchalummoodu
- Govt. HSS, Mangad
- Govt. HSS, Kummil
- Govt. Fisheries HSS, Kuzhithura, Alappat
- Govt. International HSS, Sooraanad
- Govt. MG HSS, Chadayamangalam
- Govt. HSS, Anchal West
- Govt. HSS, Sasthamkotta
- Govt. HSS, Pallimon
- Govt. VHSS, Pattazhi
- Mohammeden Govt. HSS, Edathara
- Govt. HSS, Kulathupuzha
- Govt. Model HSS, Vettikkavala
- Govt. Girls HSS, Thazhava
- Govt. HSS, Chathannoor, Kollam
- Govt. HSS, Puthur
- Govt. HSS, Thekkumbhagam, Paravur
- Guhanandapuram HSS, Chavara Thekkumbhagom
- Amrutha Sanskrit HSS, Parippally
- Milade Sherif HSS, Mynagappally
- Odanavattom Girls HSS, Odanavattom
- V V HSS, poredam
- S.N. HSS, chithara
- St. Gregorious HSS, Kottarakkara
- S.M HSS, Kottara
- S.M HSS, Patharam
- B.J.S.M Madathil HSS, Thazhava
- S.V HSS, Clappana
- St. Antony's HSS, Kanjirakode
- S.N.D.P.Y HSS, Neeravil
- M.S.M HSS, Chathinamkulam
- N.S.S HSS, Chathannoor
- S.N.S.M HSS, Elampalloor
- M.K.L.M. HSS, Kannanalloor
- CP HSS, Kuttikkadu
- Chempakassey Higher Secondary School, Bhoothakkulam
- Irumpanangadu HSS, Irumpanangadu
- Kristraj HSS, Kollam
- St. Stephen's HSS, Pathanapuram
- E V HSS, Neduvathur
- Dr CT Eapen Memorial HSS, Sasthamcotta
- Ezhippuram HSS, Parippalli
- Mayyanadu HSS, Mayyanadu
- Vimala Hridaya Girls HSS
- AKM HSS, Mailapur, Eravipuram
- Thadikad HSS, Thadikad, Anchal
- St. Goretti HSS, Punalur
- Poovathoor HSS, Kottarakkara
- St. Alosious HSS, Kollam
- N S S HSS, Prakkulam
- Sivaram N S S HSS, Karikode
- V.G.S.S Ambikodayam HSS, Kunnathoor East P.O
- HSS, for Boys, Punalur
- C V K M HSS, East Kallada
- K P M E M HSS, Cheriyavelinelloor
- M M HSS, Uppodu, East Kallada
- B V HSS, Karunagappally
- M M HSS, Nilamel
- T K M HSS, Karikkode
- Sree Narayana Trust HSS, Kollam
- S V R VHSS, Vendar
- C S I Vocational HS&HSS, for Deaf, Valakom
- St. Joseph's Convent HSS
- St. Jude HSS, Alumoodu, Mukhathala
- St. Mary's HSS, Kizhakkekara
- Vellimon HSS, Vellimon
- VHSS, Manjappara
- John F Kennady M HSS, Karunagappally
- Lourd Matha HSS, Kovilthottam
- Nehru Memorial HSS, Kaithakuzhy
- Mount Carmel E M HSS, Mathilakom
- St. John`s HSS, Karuvelil, Ezhukone
- S D A HSS, Kottarakkara
- Sabarigiri Higher Secondary School Anchal
- Mount Tabore HSS, Pathanapuram
- R V HSS, Valakom
- T V T M HSS, Veliyam
- VHSS, Vayanakom
- M A E M HSS, Karikkodu
- Jawahar HSS, Ayur
- A K M V HSS, Thadikkadu, Anchal
- Govt. HSS, Koikkal
- T K D M Govt. VHSS, Kadappakada
- Govt. HSS, Peringalam
- Govt. HSS, Ashtamudy, Kundara
- Govt. VHSS, Punnala
- Govt. HSS, Chithara
- Govt. HSS, Muttara, Kottarakkara
- Govt. HSS, Nedungolam, Paravur
- Govt. HSS, Oachira
- Govt. HSS, Yeroor
- Govt. HSS, Thevannoor
- Govt. HSS, Thodiyoor
- Govt. HSS, Kulakkada, Kottarakkara
- Govt. HSS, Poruvazhy, Kunnathoor
- Govt. VHSS, Kadakkal
- Vakkanad Govt. HSS, Kottarakkara
- Govt. HSS, Perinad
- Govt.HSS, Anchal East
- Sadanandapuram Govt. HSS
- Govt. HSS, Quilon West
- S N Trust HSS, Chathannoor
- S N Trust HSS, Punalur
- Technical HSS, Chadayamangalam.
- D.V.V. HSS, Thalavoor, Pathanapuram
- St. Thomas HSS, Punalur
- M E S English Medium HSS, Panmanam
- Sreeniketan HSS, Chathannoor
- Sree Narayana E M HSS, Valiyakulangara, Oachira
- Vivekananda HSS, Changankulangara
- N.G.P.M. HSS, Venchempu, Punalur
- T C N M GHSS, Nedumpara
- Govt.VHSS, Kottankulangara
- G P VHSS, Perumkulam
- Govt.A S HSS, Puthanthura
- M G D HSS for Boys, Kundara
- M A M HSS, Chengamanadu
- M T D M HSS, Malur
- K N N M VHSS, Pavithreswaram
- Devi Vilasom VHSS, Thalavoor
- M T HSS Valakam, Kottarakkara
- M M HSS, Vilakkudy
- Adichanalloor Panchayath HSS, Adichanalloor
- H.K.M HSS, Kallukuzhi, Umayanalloor
- The King's School, Kottiyam

=== Institutions under Directorate of VHSE ===
Additionally, there are also various schools under directorate of the Vocational Higher Secondary Education (VHSE). This is a vocational education program and hence focuses more on preparing students for specific jobs in the workforce (11). This commonly includes trades or skilled labour. This category of education is also popular in Kollam as evidenced by the high quantity of institutions under VHSE.

- Govt. VHSS for Boys, Kottarakkara
- Govt. VHSS, Anchal East
- Govt. VHSS, Punnala
- Govt. VHSS for Girls, Kottarakkara
- Govt. VHSS, Cheriazheekal
- Technical High School, Ezhukone
- Govt. VHSS, Muttara
- Govt. VHSS, Karunagappally
- Govt. VHSS for Boys
- Govt. VHSS, Kulakkada
- Govt. VHSS, Pattazhi
- Govt. VHSS, Kottankulangara
- Govt. VHSS, Chathanoor
- Govt. VHSS, Eravipuram
- Meenakshi Vilasom Govt. VHSS, Peroor
- Govt. VHSS, Kadakkal
- T.K.D.M Govt. VHSS, Uliyakovil
- Govt. VHSS for Girls, Valathungal
- Govt. VHSS, Achancoil
- Govt. RFTH School, Karunagapally
- Edamon VHSS, Edamon
- K.S.M VHSS, Edavattom
- St.John’s VHSS, Ummannoor
- St. George VHSS, Chowalloor, Edakkidom
- VHSS, Odanavattom
- Manjappara VHSS
- Jayajyothi VHSS, Poruvazhi, Ambalathumbhagam
- R VHSS, Valakom
- V VHSS, Ayathil
- Sri Vidyadiraja Memorial Model VHSS, Vendar
- B.J.S.M Madathil VHSS, Thazava
- Thadikkad VHSS, Thadikkad, Pathanapuram
- Matha VHSS, Vilakkumpara
- Vivekananda VHSS, Chadayamangalam, Poredam
- VHSS, Arkannur
- K.N Nair Memorial VHSS, Pavithreswaram
- T.E.M VHSS, Mylode
- Sivavilasam VHSS, Thamarakudy
- D.V VHSS, Thalavur, Kottarakkara
- A.K.M VHSS, Thadikad
- K.P.S.P.M VHSS, East Kallada
- V.S VHSS, Ezhukone
- I.G.M VHSS, Manjakkala
- J.E. Kennedy Memorial VHSS, Karunagappally
- A.P.P.M VHSS, Avaneeswaram
- D. VHSS, Mylom
- VHSS, Vellimon
- St.Michael VHSS Kumbalam, Mulavana
- Kuzhikkal Edavaka VHSS, Pavithreswaram, Karupinpuzha
- Vayanakom VHSS, Oachira
- NS VHSS, Valacode, Punalur
- SK VHSS, Thrikkannamangal, Kottarakkara

== Schools affiliated to CBSE ==
The CBSE is the 'Central Board of Secondary Education' and is the most common board in India (13). The CBSE uses 2 exams which are the AISSE in year 10 and AISSCE in year 12. (13)

- Siddhartha Central School Pallimon, Kollam
- Sree Narayana Public School Vadakevila;Kollam
- Trinity Lyceum Nanthirikal, Kollam
- St.Mary's E M Public School, Uliyakovil, Kollam
- Jawahar Navodaya Vidyalaya|Jawahar Navodaya Vidyalaya, Kottarakara
- Kendriya Vidyalaya, Kollam
- T.K.M. Centenary Public School
- Sree Gurudeva Central School
- Sree Narayana Trust Central School
- Sree Buddha Central School, Kurunagapally
- K.N.S.M Sree narayana Central school, Kadaikodu, Edakkidom
- National Public school, Thazhuthala, Mukhathala P.O, Kollam
- Lake Ford School, Kavanad, Kollam
- St. Mary's Residential Central School, Kavanad, Kollam
- B R Memorial Central School, Chethady, Kollam - Thirumangalam Highway, Chengamanadu
- A P R M Central School, Kizhukkumbagam, Chithara P.O, Kollam
- Sreeniketan Central School, Chathannoor Karamcodu P.O, Kollam
- Sabarigiri English School, Anchal
- St. John's School, Anchal
- Sree Narayana Central School, Nedungolam, Paravur
- St. George central School, Anchal, Kollam
- Nehru Memorial Model School, Kadakkal, Kollam
- Vimala Central School, Chathannoor, Kollam
- Toc H Residential Public School, Punalur, Kollam
- City Central School, Uliyakovil, Kollam 19
- T K M Centenary Public School, Kollam
- Sabarigiri School Punalur, Kollam
- Mar Baselios School Maruthamonpally, Pooyappally, Kollam
- The Oxford School, Thazhuthala, Umayannalloor P.O
- Chinmaya Vidyalaya, Chanthanathope, Kollam
- Amrita Vidyalayam, Puthiyakavu, Karunagappally
- Navdeep Public School, Vettilathazham, Decent Jn P.O
- Sree Narayana Central School, Karunagappally
- St. Gregorious Central School, Karunagappally
- Divine Public School, Puthoor
- Jawahar Navodaya Vidyalaya, Kottarakara
- Aiswarya Public School, Kalakkode, Paravur
- St.Jude.Central School, Mukhathala, Kollam
- Fathima Public School, Punalur
- St.Joseph International School, Chittumala, Kundara, Kollam.
- Woodlempark Public School, Chunda, Anchal. Kollam (www.woodlempark.com)
- St.Ann's English Medium School, Ayoor
- Trinity Lyceum, Nanthirickal, Kundara
- River De International School, Kulathupuzha
- Stratford Public School, Thevalakkara, Kollam
- Shantiniketan International School
- Nilamel, Kollam
- AG Public School
- Travancore Devaswom Board Central School, Vettikavala
- Brook International School, Sasthamcotta

== Schools affiliated to ICSE ==
The ICSE is the Indian Certificate of Secondary Education and is issued by the Council For The Indian School Certificate Examinations (CISCE). (13)

- Trinity Lyceum School, Kollam
- Mount Carmel Convent Anglo-Indian Girls High School
- Infant Jesus Anglo Indian High School
- Seventh Day Adventist Higher Secondary Residential School, Karickom, Kottarakkara
- St. John's Residential School, Kundara
- St. Mary's Residential Central School, Pathanapuram
- Amrita Vidyalayam, Peroor
- Mount Carmel Convent Anglo-Indian Girls High School, Kollam
- Auxilium English Medium School, Kottiyam
- PreshithaMatha School, Mangad
- Vimala Hridaya ISC School, Vadakkevila
- Maria Agnes English Medium Convent School, Kureeppuzha
- St. Joseph's Convent School, Edamon, Punalur
- St. Vincent's Convent School, Perumpuzha
- St. Charles Borromeo Convent School, Chittayam
- St. Charles Borromeo Convent School, Kadakkal
- St. Joseph International Academy, Kundara
- Mary Giri Vidya Mandir, Punalur
- Holy Trinity Anglo Indian International School, Thevalakkara

== Schools affiliated to IGCSE (Cambridge) ==
These schools take examinations from Cambridge University. After completing the IGCSE students have a qualification that is recognised globally. (10)

- The King's School, Kottiyam

== Schools with residential facilities ==
These schools allow students to board and essentially live at school. There are few of these in the Kollam district. (12)

- Jawahar Navodaya Vidyalaya|Jawahar Navodaya Vidyalaya, Kottarakara
- The Oxford School, Thazhuthala, Umayannalloor P.O
- MGM residential public school. Kottarakkara kollam
