= List of institutions of higher education in Kollam district =

Kollam district, earlier called Quilon district, is one of the 14 districts of Kerala state, India. The district is representative of all the natural attributes of Kerala states, and is endowed with a long coastal region, a major sea port on the Arabian Sea, plains and the mountains, lakes, lagoons and Kerala Backwaters, forests and the farm land, and rivers and streams. The area had mercantile relationship with Phoenicians and the Romans.

== Universities ==
- Sree Narayanaguru Open University

== Professional Colleges ==
=== Engineering and Technology Colleges ===
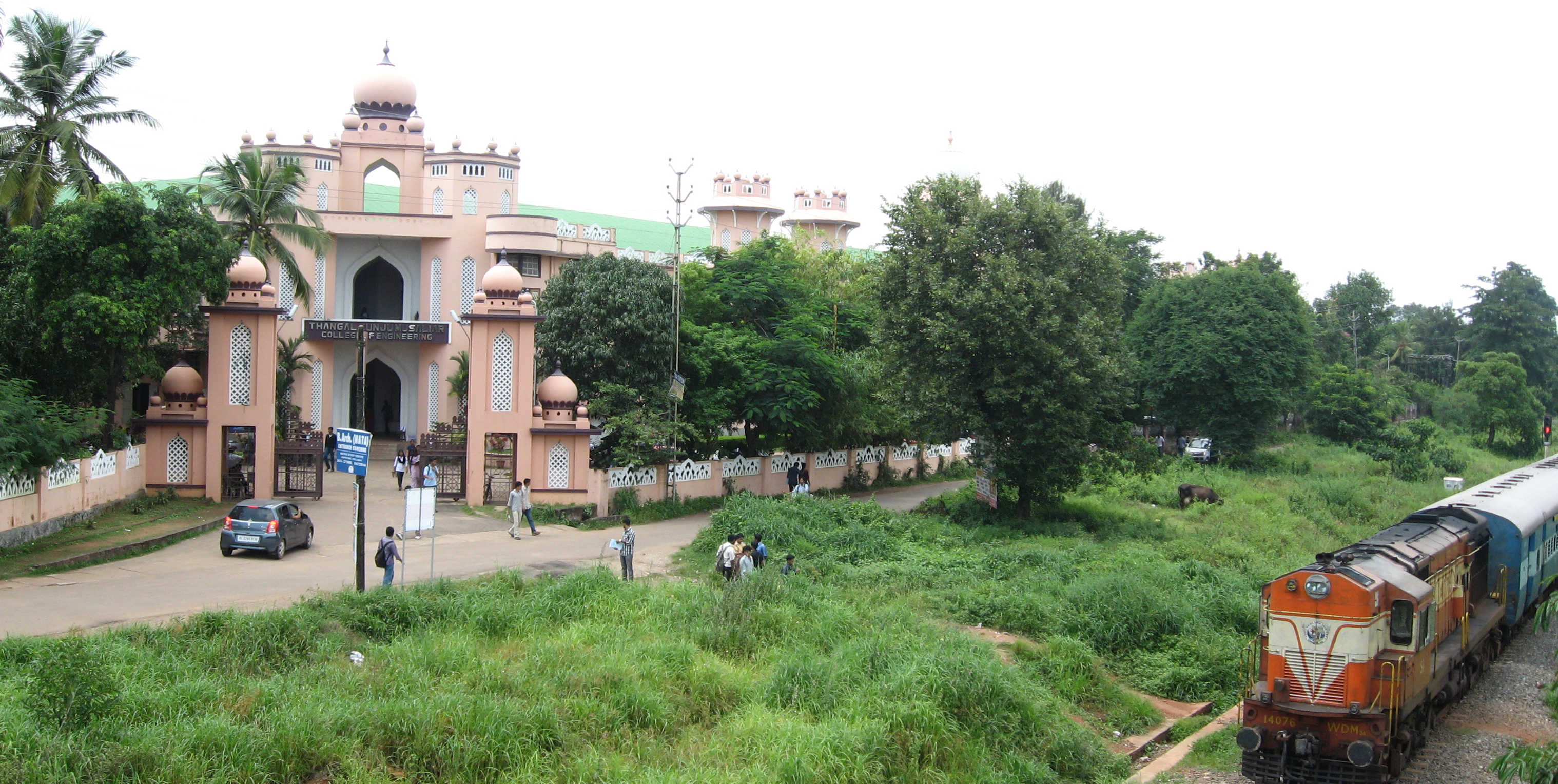
View of Kollam-Punalur Passenger Train passing by the TKM college.

The TKM College of Engineering was the first Engineering College in Kollam, Later in 1999 College of Engineering Karunagappally was established it was the first Govt. Engineering College (Second Engineering College) in Kollam (Unit of IHRD, Govt of Kerala) Later in 2000 -2001 College of Engineering Perumon was established (Under CAPE, Govt. Of Kerala)

- Government & Aided Engineering Colleges
- Thangal Kunju Musaliar College of Engineering, Kollam, Karikode (TKMCE)
- College of Engineering, Karunagappally (CEK)
- College of Engineering, Perumon (CEP)
- College of Engineering, Kottarakkara (CEK)
- College of Engineering, Pathanapuram (CEPRM)

Private Self-Financing Engineering Colleges

- Pinnacle School of Engineering and Technology, Anchal, Kollam
- Basilous Mathew II College of Engineering, Sasthamcottah
- Bishop Jerome College of Engineering and Technology, Kollam
- Hindustan College of Engineering, Arippa, Kulathuppuzha
- MES Institute of Technology And Management, Chathannoor
- S.H.M. Engineering College, Kadakkal
- TKM Institute of Technology, Karuvelil
- Travancore Engineering College, Roadvila, Oyoor
- U K F College of Engineering & Technology, Meenambalam.
- Younus College of Engineering & Technology, Pallimukku
- Younus College of Engineering for Women, Kottarakkara, Kollam
- Younus Institute of Technology, Kannanalloor.
- Amrita School of Engineering, Vallikavu, Clappana, Kollam

=== Medical Institutions ===
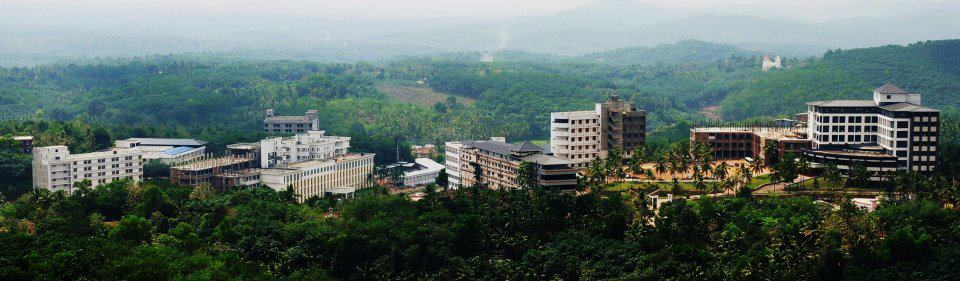
Azeezia Institute of Medical Science and Research, Meeyannoor, Kollam

- Government Medical College, Kollam
- Azeezia Medical College, Meeyannoor
- Travancore Medical College, Medicity, Kollam
- Sree Narayana Institute of Ayurvedic Studies & Research, Karimpinpuzha, Puthoor, Kollam
- Amrita Ayurveda Medical College, Karunagappally, Kollam

=== Business & Management Institutes ===
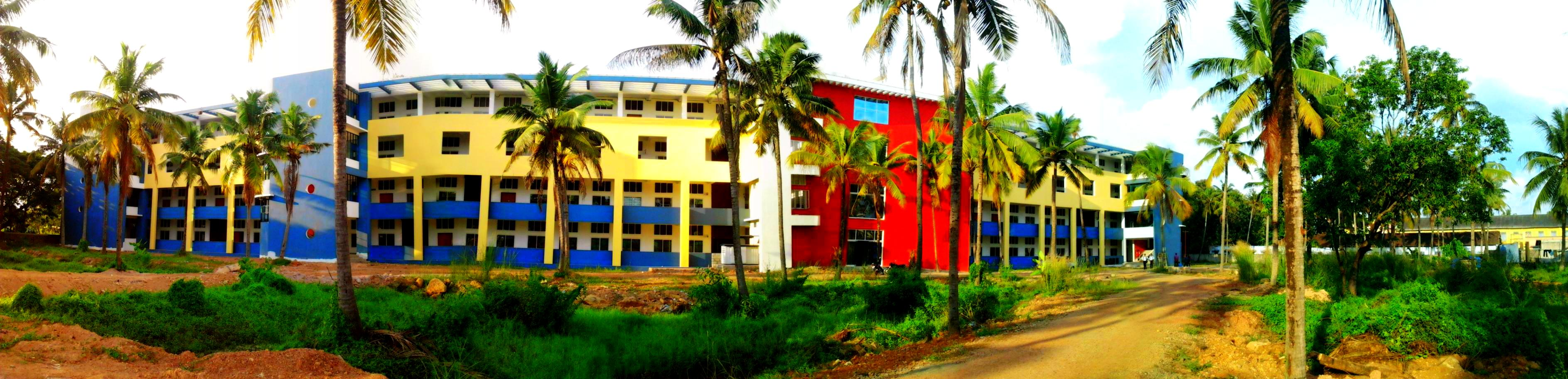
Panoramic view of Bishop Jerome Group of Institutions, Kollam

- T K M Institute of Management, Kollam
- Member Sree Narayana Pillai Institute of Management & Technology, Mukundapuram, Chavara, Kollam
- Bishop Jerome School of Management, Kollam
- Institute of Management-Kerala, Kollam
- Institute of Management-Kerala, Kundara
- Travancore Business Academy, Vadakkevila, Kollam
- Gurudev Institute of Management Studies (GIMS), Kadakkal
- Sankar Institute of Science, Technology and Management, Chathannoor
- Horizon Educational Foundation, Kollam
- Quilon Institute of Technology for Women, Kollam
- Gurudev Institute of Management Studies, Kadakkal
- Sankar Institute of Science Technology and Management, Chathanoor
- MSN Institute of Management and Technology, Mukundapuram P.O, Chavara

=== Architecture Colleges ===
- Thangal Kunju Musaliar College of Engineering, Kollam, Karikode
- Nizar Rahim & Mark School of Architecture, Madannada, Kollam
- Bishop Jerome Institute, Karbala, Kollam

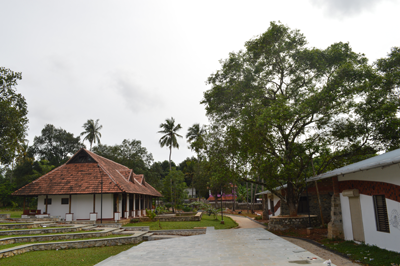
A view of Kerala State Institute of Design campus

=== Design Institutes ===
- Kerala State Institute of Design

=== Law Colleges ===
- Sree Narayana Guru College of Legal Studies, Kollam
- N.S.S Law College, Kottiyam

=== Nursing Colleges ===
- Bishop Benziger College of Nursing, Kollam
- Upasana College of Nursing, Kollam
- Travancore College of Nursing, Kollam
- Holy Cross College of Nursing, Kottiyam
- Azeezia Nursing College, Meeyannoor, Kollam
- Mercy college of Nursing, Kottarakkara, Kollam
- Vijaya College of Nursing, Kottarakkara, Kollam
- Vellapalli Natesan Shashtiabdapoorthi Smaraka College of Nursing, Kollam
- St. Joseph's College of Nursing, Kollam
- Royal College of Nursing, Chathannoor

=== Polytechnic Colleges ===
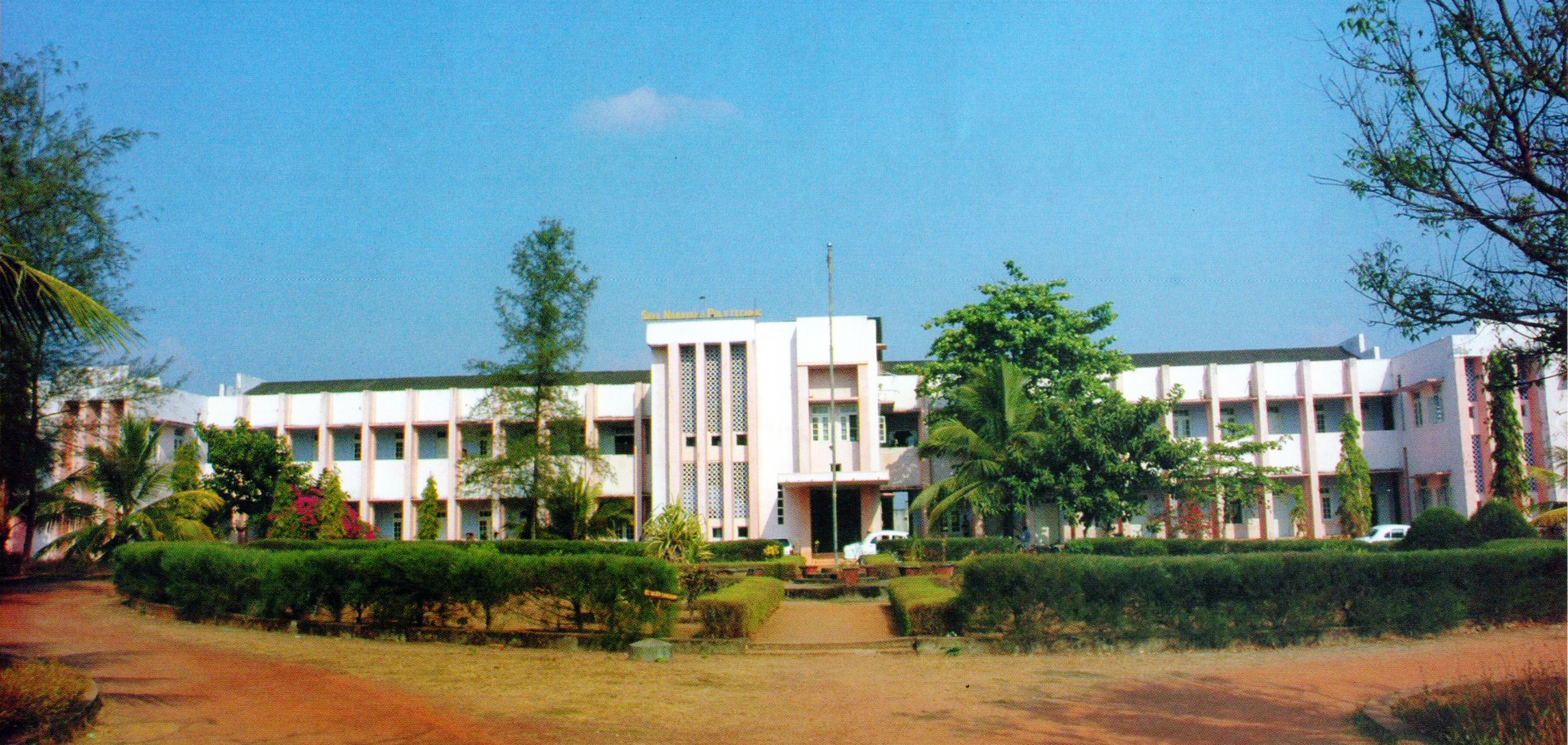
SN Polytechnic College (S.N.P.T.C) Kottiyam in 2008

- Sree Narayana Poly (SN Poly) Technic College (S N P T C), Kottiyam
- Government Polytechnic College, Punalur
- Government Polytechnic College, Ezhukone
- Model Polytechnic College, Karunagappally, Kollam

=== Fashion Technology Colleges ===
- Apparel Training and Design Center (ATDC Vocational College)
- Institute of Fashion Technology Kerala (IFTK), Vellimon, Kollam

=== MCA Colleges ===
- Mar Baselios Institute of Technology, Anchal
- Marthoma College of Science and Technology, Ayur
- Sree Narayana Institute Of Technology, Vadakkevila, Kollam

=== Training & B.Ed Centres ===
- Badhiriya B.Ed.Training College
- Jamia Training College
- Valiyam Memorial College of Teacher Education
- Haneefa Kunju Memorial College Of Education
- Sri Vidyadhiraja Model College of Teacher Education
- Millath College Of Teacher Education, Sooranadu
- College of Teacher Education, Arkannoor, Ayur
- Sabarigiri College of Education, Anchal
- Fathima Memorial Training College, Mylapore
- Mannam Foundation Centre For Education Technology, Kollam
- Rama Vilasom Training College, Valakom
- Mannam Memorial Training College, Punalur
- Baselios Marthoma Mathews II Training College
- Fathima Memorial Training College, Pallimukku
- Karmela Rani Training College, Kollam
- Mount Tabor Training College, Pathanapuram
- Manjappara Educational And Charitable Trust B.Ed. College

== Arts and Science Colleges ==
- Mar Thoma College of Science and Technology, Ayur
- Sree Narayana College, Kollam
- Sree Narayana College for Women, Kollam
- Fatima Matha National College, Kollam
- MMNSS College Kottiyam
- T.K.M. College of Arts & Science, Kollam
- Marthoma college of science & technology, Ayur
- Sree Sankara Sanskrit Vithyapeedom College Edakkidom
- Devaswom Board College, Sasthamcotta
- College of Applied Science IHRD, Kundara
- Baby John Memorial Government College, Chavara
- St. John's College, Anchal
- St. Stephen's College, Pathanapuram
- St. Gregorios College, Kottarakkara
- N.S.S. College, Nilamel
- Sree Narayana College, Punalur
- Sree Narayana College, Chathannur
- Sree Vidyadhiraja College of Arts and Science, Karunagappally
- P.M.S.A Pookoya Thangal Memorial Arts & Science College
- UIT, Mulamkadakom

== See also ==
- List of colleges affiliated to University of Kerala
- List of colleges affiliated with Cochin University of Science and Technology
- List of Engineering Colleges in Kerala
- List of Medical Colleges in Kerala
- List of schools in Kollam district
