= M. K. A. Hameed =

Indian politician

Member of the Legislative Assembly of Kerala
- In office 1967–1970
- Preceded by: T. O. Bava
- Succeeded by: A. A. Kochunny
- Constituency: Aluva

Personal details
- Born: October 1930 Alwaye, Madras Presidency, British India
- Died: 25 November 1998 (aged 68) Aluva, Kerala, India
- Spouse: Sherifa Beevi
- Children: M. A. Mahaboob; M. A. Habeeb; M. A. Haseeb
- Relatives: M. K. Mackar Pillay (uncle); Thangal Kunju Musaliar (father-in-law)
- Education: Madras Institute of Technology; Missouri University of Science and Technology
- Occupation: Politician; Academic; Industrialist
- Known for: Founding the Hycount Group

Manadath Khader Pillay Abdul Hameed (October 1930 – November 1998) was an Indian politician, academic, and businessman who represented Aluva in the Kerala Legislative Assembly between 1967 and 1970. Hameed also served as the first Vice Chairman of the Kerala State Planning Board.

== Early life and education ==
M. K. A. Hameed was born in October 1930 to M. K. Khader Pillay, a former President of the Alwaye Municipality, and recipient of the Khan Sahib title. He is also the nephew of prominent industrialist and philanthropist M. K. Mackar Pillay.

After graduating from the Madras Institute of Technology, Hameed joined Fertilisers and Chemicals Travancore (FACT) as a chemical engineer.

Hameed married Sherifa Beevi, a daughter of prominent industrialist and educationalist Thangal Kunju Musliar.

== Career ==
M. K. A. Hameed became the vice principal of the newly founded Thangal Kunju Musliar College of Engineering. Later, he pursued his master's degree in mechanical engineering at the Missouri University of Science and Technology, before returning to assume the role of principal of the TKM College of Engineering.

In 1967, Hameed contested and won the Kerala Legislative Assembly Elections from the Aluva constituency as an independent backed by the Communist Party of India (Marxist).

After retiring from politics, Hameed founded the Hycount Group, one of the pioneers of PVC plumbing in Kerala.
