= NKL =

NKL may refer to:

- National Basketball League (Lithuania), a basketball league
- Coop NKL, a Norwegian cooperative
- Nalikul railway station, the station code NKL
- NSS Law College, the registration code NKL
- Nkolo-Fuma Airport, the IATA code NKL
- Naval Outlying Landing Field Holley, the FAA LID code NKL
- Nepal Kabaddi League, a Nepalese kabaddi franchise league
