= P. B. Suresh Kumar =

Indian judge

Hon'ble Justice P. B. Suresh Kumar

Judge of the Kerala High Court
- Incumbent
- Assumed office 21 May 2014

Personal details
- Born: 30 June 1963 (age 62)
- Occupation: Judge

P. B. Suresh Kumar (30 June 1963) is a judge of the Kerala High Court, the highest court in the Indian state of Kerala and in the Union Territory of Lakshadweep.

== Biography ==
Kumar was educated at St. Aloysius Higher Secondary School, Kollam and completed legal studies at KGF Law College, Kolar (now Sri Kengal Hanumanthaiya Law College). He began practicing in February 1987 and was designated a senior advocate in July 2011. On 21 May 2014 he was sworn in as an additional judge of the Kerala High Court by Chief Justice Manjula Chellur in Kochi, and was appointed a permanent member of the court on 20 May 2016.

== Decisions ==
In 2020, while determining orders in a dispute over control of a building of the Malankara Church in Ernakulam, Kumar was the recipient of death threats indicating he would be immolated.

In Ridha Fathima v. State of Kerala, within the context of India's COVID-19 vaccine mandates requiring students to be vaccinated to attend exams in-person, Kumar affirmed the principle of "reasonable exceptions" to certain individual rights when the greater welfare of the public in general was at stake.
