= Raja Vijayaraghavan V. =

Judge of the Kerala High Court

Hon'ble Justice Raja Vijayaraghavan V

Judge Kerala High Court
- Incumbent
- Assumed office 10 April 2015
- Nominated by: Rajendra Mal Lodha
- Appointed by: Pranab Mukherjee

Personal details
- Born: 28 May 1967 (age 59) Kollam
- Citizenship: Indian
- Website: High Court of Kerala

Raja Vijayaraghavan Valsala (born 28 May 1967) is a judge of the Kerala High Court, the highest court in the Indian state of Kerala and in the Union Territory of Lakshadweep.

== Early life and career ==
Raja completed his schooling from Deva Mata Convent School, Kollam, Trinity Lyceum School, Kollam, St. Aloysius Higher Secondary School, Kollam and Fatima Mata National College, Kollam, graduated from Thangal Kunju Musaliar College of Engineering, Kollam and obtained a law degree from Kerala Law Academy Law College, Thiruvananthapuram. Raja enrolled as an Advocate in 1994 and started practice at Kollam, later shifting his practice to Kerala High Court. On 10 April 2015 he was appointed as an additional judge of Kerala High Court and became permanent from 5 April 2017.
