= NSS Law College =

Law school in Kerala, India

- Other names: = NSSLC
- Type: Legal education
- Established: 2012
- Affiliations: University of Kerala
- Academic affiliations: Bar Council of India
- Principal: G. Rajasekharan Nair
- Location: Kollam, Kerala, India; 8.8704°N 76.6677°E
- Campus: 5 acres (2.0 ha)
- Website: www.nsslawcollege.org
- Logo of NSS Law College

NSS Law College is the first self-financing law college in Kottiyam, Kollam, Kerala. It is the first venture by Nair Service Society in the field of legal education. The college is affiliated to the University of Kerala and has recognition from Bar Council of India. The registration code for college in the university is NKL.

== College and courses ==
The NSS Law College is situated at a five-acre (2.0 ha) acre campus in Kottiyam town, 10 km (6.2 mi) from the city of Kollam, adjacent to Mannam Memorial NSS College of Arts and Science. They are running Integrated Five Year LLB course since 2013, subject to the conditions stipulated by the University of Kerala, Bar Council of India and Government. The college can admit 30 students on every year for the integrated LLB course.

== See also ==
- Educational institutions in Kollam district
- Nair Service Society
