= Kadaikodu =

- village
- Location in Kerala, India Kadaikodu (India)
- Coordinates: 8°57′0″N 76°44′0″E
- Country: India
- State: Kerala
- District: Kollam
- Panchayat: Kareepra
- Block: Kottarakara

Languages
  - Official: Malayalam, English
- Time zone: UTC+5:30 (IST)
- Postal code: 691 505
- Distance from Kollam: 23 kilometres (14 mi) north
- Distance from Ezhukone: 6 kilometres (3.7 mi)

Kadaikodu is a village near Edakkidom in Kollam district in the Indian state of Kerala, located approximately 23 km (14 mi) north of Kollam city. The Kadaikodu Sree Mahadeva Temple is its main attraction.

== Schools ==
- Govt LPS KADAIKODU Estd.1928.
- SNGSHS ( Sree Narayana Guru Sanskrit High School)
- KNS Central School Kadaikodu (Sree Narayana Trust)

== Educational institutions ==
- Universal Study Center Kadaikodu

== Library ==
- Public Library Kadaikodu was inaugurated by famous cine artist Bharath Murali (Malayalam actor) 30 August 1998.

== Studio ==
- Parvaty Digital Studio And Video

== Distance from nearest known places ==
- Kottarakara : 10 km
- Ezhukone : 5 km
- Kundara : 12 km
- Kannanalloor : 16 km
- Chathannoor : 13 km
- Odanavattom : 5 km
- Edakkidom ഇടയ്ക്കിടം : 2 km
