= Midukki =

- Genre: Reality show
- Presented by: Rima Kallingal (Season 1); Pearle Maaney (Season 2)
- Country of origin: India
- Original language: Malayalam
- No. of seasons: 02
- No. of episodes: 84 + 1

Production
- Producer: Satheesh Kumar
- Running time: 45 minutes

Original release
- Network: Mazhavil Manorama
- Release: 18 January – 4 August 2013; 11 December 2017 (season 2)

Midukki was an Indian reality television series in a beauty pageant style which was aired on the Mazhavil Manorama channel.

The first season of the show was hosted by Mollywood actress Rima Kallingal. Sneha Unnikrishnan was declared the winner of the show. Popular choreographer Sajna Najam handled the choreography for the contestants' performances. The show was replaced by Uggram Ujjwalam.

Mazhavil Manorama announced the new season of the show in early September 2017. It was launched in a different manner only with a mega grand finale.

== Plot summary ==
The show aimed to find the smartest women of Kerala. It consisted of four permanent judges: Ambika Pillai, Dr. Piyush, Dr. Zaileshya and Shalini. It was hosted by the Malayalam film actress Rima Kallingal. It consisted of 20 contestants from across Kerala who were aged 18–25.

Sneha Unnikrishnan won the first prize. Remya Menon and Reba Monica John won 1st runner-up and 2nd runner-up respectively.

== Results ==
| Final results | Contestant |
|---|---|
| Winner | Sneha Unnikrishnan |
| 1st Runner-up | Remya Menon |
| 2nd Runner-up | Reba Monica John |
| 3rd Runner-up | Aileena Catherin Amon |
| Top 6 | Cukku; Nilja |

== Midukki 2017 ==
Midukki 2017 show is aimed to find out most beautiful, most smart, most intelligent model from 14 districts of Kerala. Most aspiring models are aiming to win title of Midukki 2017 as it will give them great exposure to film industry. Auditions were held in famous colleges across Kerala and the selected top 14 contestants participated in the Grand Finale.Television personality Pearle Maaney hosted the finale episode along with RJ Mathukkutty. Actress Shobhana was the chief judge along with Suraj Venjaramoodu, Prayaga Martin and Deepti Sati.

Shruthi Paul was titled "Midukki".

=== Top 5 ===
Mintu Shruthi Aadithya Shamil Namitha Merlin Anna Neha Manoharan
