= Ambika Pillai =

Indian hair stylist and make-up artist

- Born: Thiruvananthapuram, Kerala
- Occupation: Make-up Artist
- Spouses: Surendra Nath(1980-1988); Rakesh Rocky( 1993-1996)
- Children: Kavitha
- Parents: Gopinath Pillai; Santha Pillai
- Website: www.ambikapillai.com

Ambika Pillai is a hair stylist and make-up artist from Kollam, Kerala, India. Her work regularly appears in advertising campaigns, catwalk shows, fashion films, and editorials.

== Personal life ==
Ambika Pillai was born to cashew exporter Gopinath Pillai & Santha Gopinath Pillai in Thiruvananthapuram, Kerala. Her family then moved to her native place in Kollam, where she had a luxurious childhood, living in a bungalow by the backwaters of Kollam. After her boarding in Ooty, at the age of 7, she joined Mount Carmel Convent Anglo-Indian Girls High School in Kollam. She was married to Surenda Nath on 1980 at the age of 17 and moved to Calcutta to have a settled married life. Things did not turn out the way she had desired, and she instead had to be satisfied with living in a tiny one bed room apartment. They have one daughter, Kavitha. Later she married Rakesh (aka Rocky) in 1993 but due to his heavy drinking & gambling she left him. Her three sisters, Gopika, Renuka and Devika were trained by her and are also into hair and skin makeover. She lives in New Delhi but frequently travels to Trivandrum and Kochi.

== Career ==
She started her career as a hair stylist and moved on to make-up. When Ambika started her first salon it was called Visions by Ambika. She later decided to develop it as a brand. At present Ambika Pillai is a brand by itself. Pillai's salon has branches in South Extension, Punjabi Bagh, Rajouri Garden, Malviya Nagar and Model Town in the Delhi National Capital Territory; Gurgaon in Haryana; Chhatarpur in Madhya Pradesh; and Kochi and Trivandrum in Kerala.

== Awards ==
Awards	Year
Vogue Best Make-up Artist Award	2011
Cosmopolitan Fun Fearless Female Awards for Best Hair and Makeup artist	2009
Bharat Nirman Super Achievers Award	2007
Zee Idea Fashion Awards for Best Make up artist of the year	2006
Zee Idea Fashion Awards for Best Hair Stylist of the year	2006
Kingfisher Fashion awards for the best hair designer of the year	2000
IAAFA Award for Best Make-up Artist	1996

== Television ==
Pillai has appeared as a judge in:

- Midukki (Mazhavil Manorama)
- Malayali Veetamma (Flowers)
