= P. Meerakutty =

Malayalam writer

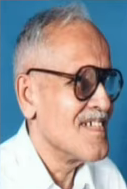
- Born: 28 February 1930; Thankalam, Kothamangalam, Kerala
- Died: 24 August 2017 (aged 87); Ernakulam
- Occupations: Writer, literary critic, teacher
- Writing career
- Language: Malayalam
- Genres: Literary Criticism, Essay, History, biography

Pareeth Mammy Meerakutty (28 February 1930 – 24 August 2017) was a Malayalam writer, literary critic, and teacher. He taught Malayalam language and literature at various levels of educational institutions in a teaching career spanning over 44 years. Meerakutty served as a General Council Member of the Kerala Sahitya Akademi during the period 2011–2014.

== Life sketch ==
Meerakutty was born at Thankalam in Kothamangalam Municipality in Kerala state, India on 28 February 1930 to Marottickal Pareeth Mammy and Kayyamma.

=== Education ===
He did his school education from Mathirappilly Govt. Primary School, Thrikkariyoor NSS Middle School, Muvattupuzha NSS Malayalam High School and Kothamangalam Mar Basil English High School. He earned a Bachelor of Arts (BA) in Malayalam Literature, Master of Arts (MA) in Malayalam Literature, Malayalam Sahithya Visarad and Hindi Rashtrabhasha Visarad degrees through self study. He did his 'Bachelor in Education (BEd) study at Thalassery Govt. Training College.

=== Academic career ===
His 44 years long career as a teacher started at Netaji Library Adult Education Programme at Kothamangalam. Later he worked as Malayalam Teacher in Asramam High School Perumbavoor, Mar Basil High School Kothamangalam and M.G.M High School Kuruppampady. In 1966, he joined the department of Malayalam in Thangal Kunju Musaliar College of Arts and Sciences, Kollam and worked there till 1990. Simultaneously he prepared students for Teacher Training course at Kuruppampady Vidvan Vidyalaya for 15 years. He was appointed as Professor Emeritus at Sree Sankaracharya University of Sanskrit, Kalady.

=== Literary works ===
Meerakutty's literary works falls under the categories of Literary Criticism, History of Literature, Grammar, History, biography, Children's Literature and Translation. His views on Sabarimala Ayyappan and Onam are controversial.

=== Committee organization ===
Meerakutty served as General Council Member of the Kerala Sahitya Akademi during the period 2011–2014. He was one of the founders of Kadhasamithy at Muvattupuzha. He also served as the Kollam District President of Purogamana Kala Sahitya Sangham (Progressive Arts & Literary Organisation) an Association for Art and Letters, also known as the PuKaSa, an organization of artists, writers and art and literature enthusiasts based in Kerala. He was also State committee member of the All Kerala Private School Teachers Association (AKPCTA) and an Association of Sixty Opted College Teachers.

=== Personal life ===
He married K.Suleikha Beevi in the year 1960. He has four children, Dr. Shiney Ali, Dr. Rejula Rabi, M.Shairaj IRS and Dr. Lajni Shafeeq.

=== Dementia and Death ===
In 2010, dementia and memory loss symptoms developed and he was identified as having Alzheimer's disease (AD) which ultimately led to his death during the early hours of 24 August 2017

== Bibliography ==
=== Literary Criticism ===
- Asan Kavitha: Kaviyude Atmakatha
- Asan, Kerala Kalidasan
- Asan Kavitha Rodhavum Prathirodhavum
- Asan Thott Idassery Vare
- Leela (Lakhu Pdanam)
- Chandlabhikshuki (Lakhu Pdanam)
- Vilasiniyude Akhyanakala
- Vilasiniyude Novalukal: Athmakathayude Padabhedangal
- Appan Kavithayude Thirumadhuraprasadam
- Thachethu Kavithayude Pooppoli
- Manappadan Kavithalathayude Harithakalavanyapooram
- Mukhathalayude Khandakavyangal
- Idassery: Navabhavukathinte Kavi
- Basheer: Kalathinte Kanal
- Athyanthadhunika Niroopanam
- Amruthalekha
- Akalakkazhchakal
- Basheerinte Poovanpazham

=== History of Literature ===
- Isangal Sahithyathiyathil(3rd Edition published in 2019 by Haritham Books, Calicut)
- Thanathu Puthusidhanthangal
- Ankurangal
- Ethalukal
- Kalapabodhathinte Kanikal

=== Grammar ===
- Kerala Panineeyam: Chila Anubandha Chinthakal

=== History ===
- Sabarimala Sri Ayyappanum Kunjanum (2nd Edition was published in 2018 by Haritham Books, Calicut)
- Sabarimala Sri Ayyappanum Mattu Padanangalum

=== Biography ===
- A. Thangal Kunju Musaliar
- Novel Pole Oru Athmakatha (Two Parts) Autobiography

=== Children's Literature ===
- Jalaluddin Rumi Kathakal
- Poomottukal

=== Translation ===
- Ramayana Champu Sundarakandam (From Sanskrit)
- Nellinte Katha (From English) (Published by the National Book Trust)

== Awards and recognition ==
- Asan Centenary Award
- Vallathol Award
- State Bank of Travancore Literary Award
- Kesary Award
- Samvedanam Award
- C. H. Mohammed Koya Award
- Sahodaran Ayyappan Award
- Atmayanangalude Kasak Award

== Legacy ==
There are three literary awards and an endowment instituted in the memory of Prof. Meerakutty.

The Prof. P. Meerakutty Foundation, Thrikkakkara, Kochi has instituted a yearly award worth Rs 25,000. The first award was presented to Sri. Iyyamcode Sreedharan, a writer and former Secretary of Kerala Kalamandalam for his biographical book Swapnadanam dedicated to poet P. Kunhiraman Nair. In 2019, the award was presented to best Malayalam teacher and the awardee was Prof. Mini Prasad. The award for the year 2020/21 was presented to Ms. Abhirami who was selected as the best young poet of the year in Malayalam This award was presented to the winner by the then Governor of Kerala Arif Mohammad Khan. In the next year, 2022, the award was for the best young short story writer of the year in Malayalam. The winner was K.Nithin for his work, ‘Oan’. The year 2023 was the birth centenary of the great Malayalam poet Kumaran Asan and hence the Foundation decided to present the award for the year to the best critical study on his poems. Praveen K T, a young researcher at the University of Calicut was the winner for his research paper “ njanodayathinte keralaparisaram”. In 2024/25, the award was decided to present to the best news paper article in Malayalam which promotes art, culture and literature. The award was won by Jijo John Puthezhath, Sr. Correspondent Malayala Manorama for his work ‘Gondukalude Varakalkku Enthaanithra Chuvappu?’ and the award was presented to him by the Governor of Kerala Rajendra Arlekar.

The Malayalam monthly Bhoomikkaran instituted an award in the memory of Meerakutty. The first award was presented to Sri.K.Sukumaran for his Malayalam novel Mahanadikkarayil in 2018 February. The award for 2019 was presented to Sri. Ramachandran Karavaram for his novel Aparaswathwam Nirakaram. The prize for 2020 was awarded to Rajesh Varma for his novel Chuvanna Badge. The prize for 2021/ 22 to Sri Rajagopal Vagathanam for his book Jathivyavasthayude Rashtreeya Bhoomika. In the year 2023, the winner was Prof. T. J. Joseph for his Autobiography titled Attupokatha Ormakal which was published by DC Books in January 2020. Attupokatha Ormakal is interpretation about the Assault on T. J. Joseph by extremists which occurred on 4 July 2010. The prize for 2024 was awarded to M.V.Janardhanan for his novel Perumalayan.

The poetry award by Suvarnarekha, an art and literary organisation based at Kothamangalam is named after Meerakutty. The first year award was presented to Smt. Brinda, for her collection of poems, ‘Avan Poombattakalude Thottathilekku Chiraku Vidarthunnu" published by DC Books

The Syndicate of the Kerala state-run public university in India, University of Kerala decided to Institute an Endowment Award in the University in the name of Prof.P.Meerakutty, renowned writer in its meeting held on 05.03.2021 to honor students with outstanding achievements in the field of Malayalam.
