= Brook International School, Sasthamcotta =

International school in Sasthamkotta, Kerala, India

Coordinates: 9.0375°N 76.6181°E

Brook International School (BIS) Sasthamkotta is an English medium school, affiliated to CBSE, New Delhi, with affiliation Number 930717. It is located on 5.7 acres (23,000 m^{2}) of land on the bank of Lake Sasthamkotta in Kerala, India. Its faculty consists of 60 teachers, who teach 1225 students. The school is affiliated with the Central Board of Secondary Education, New Delhi in 2007, and owned and managed by the Viva Trust.

The school was founded by Fr. Dr. G. Abraham Thalothil on June 2, 2005.

Brook International School started with kindergarten to classes VI in the 2005–06 academic year, now the school offers all primary and secondary grades up to 12th. The school has room for over 60 class divisions and is equipped with science labs, library, and a computer lab.

The school grounds offer an area for children to play football.

== Location ==
Brook International is 12 kilometers east of the National Highway from Karunagappally, 18 kilometers southwest of MC Road from Adoor, and connected by network of roads and railways to nearby cities and pilgrimage center.

Address: Rajagiri, Sasthamkotta, Kollam, Kerala, India, 690 521
