= Karicode =

Karikode
- Neighbourhood
- Karicode
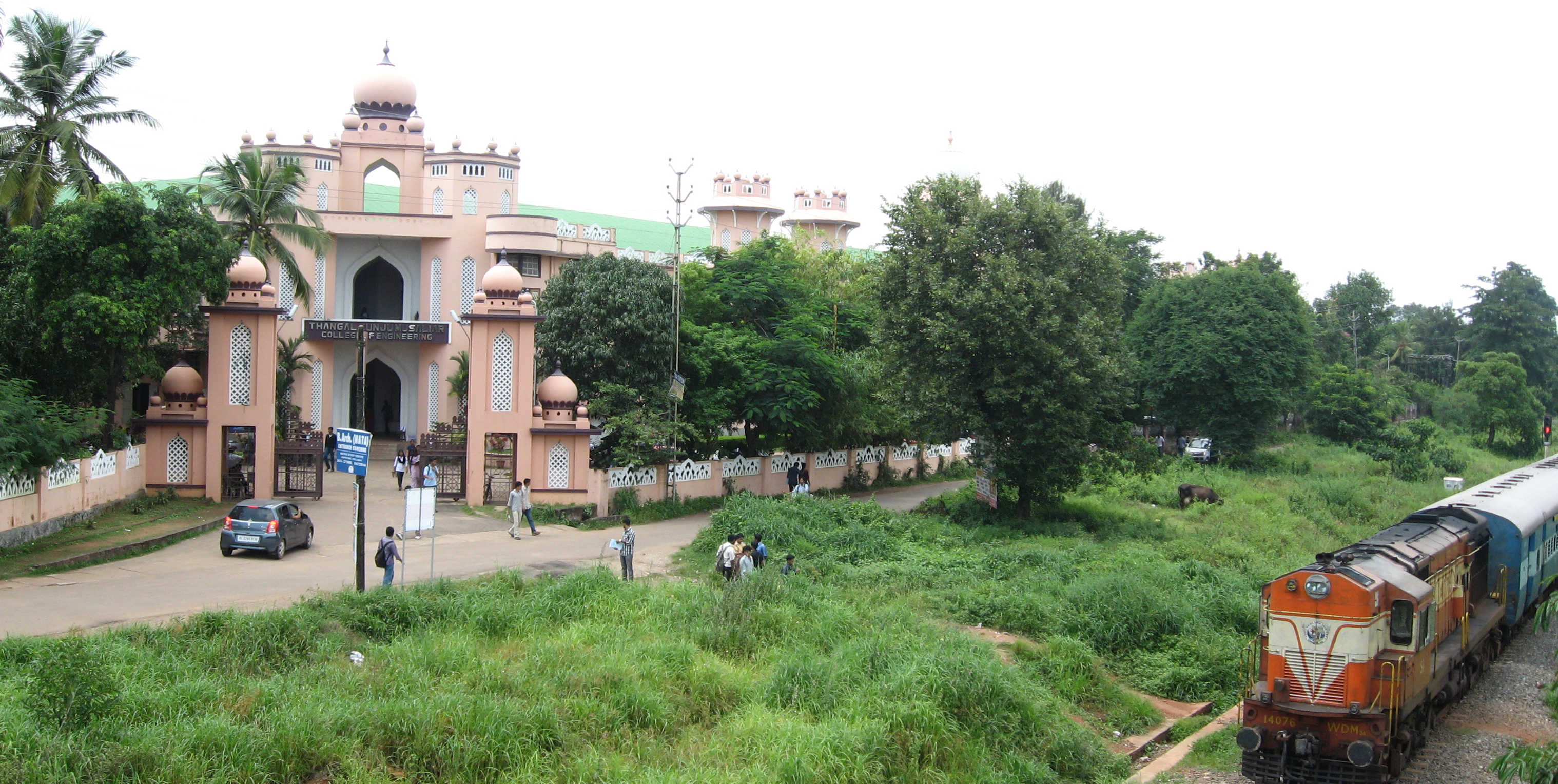
- TKM college in Karikode

- Location in Kerala, India Karikode (Kerala)
- Coordinates: 8°54′57.3480″N 76°37′57.7220″E
- Country: India
- State: Kerala
- District: Kollam district
- Municipal Corporation: Kollam

Languages
  - Official: Malayalam
- Time zone: UTC+5:30 (IST)
- PIN: 691005
- Telephone code: 0474
- Vehicle registration: KL-02
- Website: Kollam Municipal Corporation

Karicode or Karikodu is a neighbourhood of Kollam city in Kerala, India. It is about 5 km away from Kollam city centre. Karicode is the 23rd ward in Kollam Municipal Corporation council. The place is very famous because of educational institutions run by TKM Group (Thangal Kunju Musaliar Group). Thangal Kunju Musaliar College of Engineering in Kollam is the first self-financing engineering college in Kerala state. The college, established in 1958, is to be considered as the pioneers in engineering education in Kerala. TKM Arts & Science college is also situated at Karicode.

== Importance ==
Karicode is one among the cashew processing hubs of Kollam. It was a part of Kilikollur panchayath before. Kilikollur has the largest number of cashew processing factories in India. When Kollam Municipality was upgraded as city corporation in the year 2000, Karicode also merged with Kollam along with Kilikollur. The congested stretch of National Highway 744 passing through Karicode makes the place a traffic black-spot in Kollam city. Multiple accidents happened in Karicode area because of the congested, under developed NH stretch.

Kilikollur railway station is situated in Karicode. It is the first railway station from Kollam in the railway line from Kollam to Tenkasi.

== Transport ==
Karicode is situated on National Highway 744 connecting the city of Kollam with Tamil Nadu. Nearest railway station is Kilikollur railway station, situated at Karicode. This gives the location direct connectivity to Kollam Junction railway station situated at a distance of 6 km from here that connects to all the major cities of India.

== Educational Institutions in Karicode ==
The following Educational Institutions are located in and around Karicode.

- TKM College of Engineering
- T.K.M. College of Arts and Science
- Sivaram NSS Higher Secondary School
- T.K.M Higher Secondary School
- MEA English Medium Higher Secondary School
- Amrita Vidyalayam
- Chathinamkulam MSM Higher Secondary School
- Karicode Gvt Lower Primary School
- T.K.M. Centenary Public School
- T.K.M. Kindergarten
