= Odanavattam =

Odanavattom
- Village
- Location in Kerala, India Odanavattom (India)
- Coordinates: 8.935461°N 76.771313°E
- Country: India
- State: Kerala
- District: Kollam

Population (2011)
  - Total: 15,732

Languages
  - Official: Malayalam, English
- Time zone: UTC+5:30 (IST)
- PIN: 691512
- Telephone code: 0474
- Vehicle registration: KL-

Odanavattom is a village in Kollam district in the state of Kerala, India. The village is situated 22 km east from Kollam town and is under the administration of Veliyam panchayath. Odanavattom is near to Edakkidom and Kottarakkara the birthplace of Kathakali.

== Education ==
There is a Government Senior Secondary school in the town. There are also many private Upper Primary schools in Odanavattam. K.R.G.P.M School is situated here. Odanavattom is near to Edakkidom and Kottarakkara the birthplace of Kathakali

== Tourism ==
Muttara Maruthimala ecotourism is located near Odanavattom. Iruppinkuttu waterfalls is also located near Odanavattom.

== Demographics ==
As of 2011 India census, Odanavattam had a population of 15732 with 7429 males and 8303 females.

== Politics ==
Odanavattom is part of Mavelikara Lok Sabha constituency.
