= T.K.M. Centenary Public School =

Thangal Kunju Musaliar Centenary Public School
- TKMCPS

Location
- Kollam; India; 8°54′49″N 76°38′06″E

Information
- Type: Private
- Motto: Seek Knowledge from Cradle to Heaven
- Established: 1997
- Principal: Mrs. Saboora Beegum
- Faculty: 200
- Affiliation: Central Board of Secondary Education
- Website: https://www.tkmcps.com

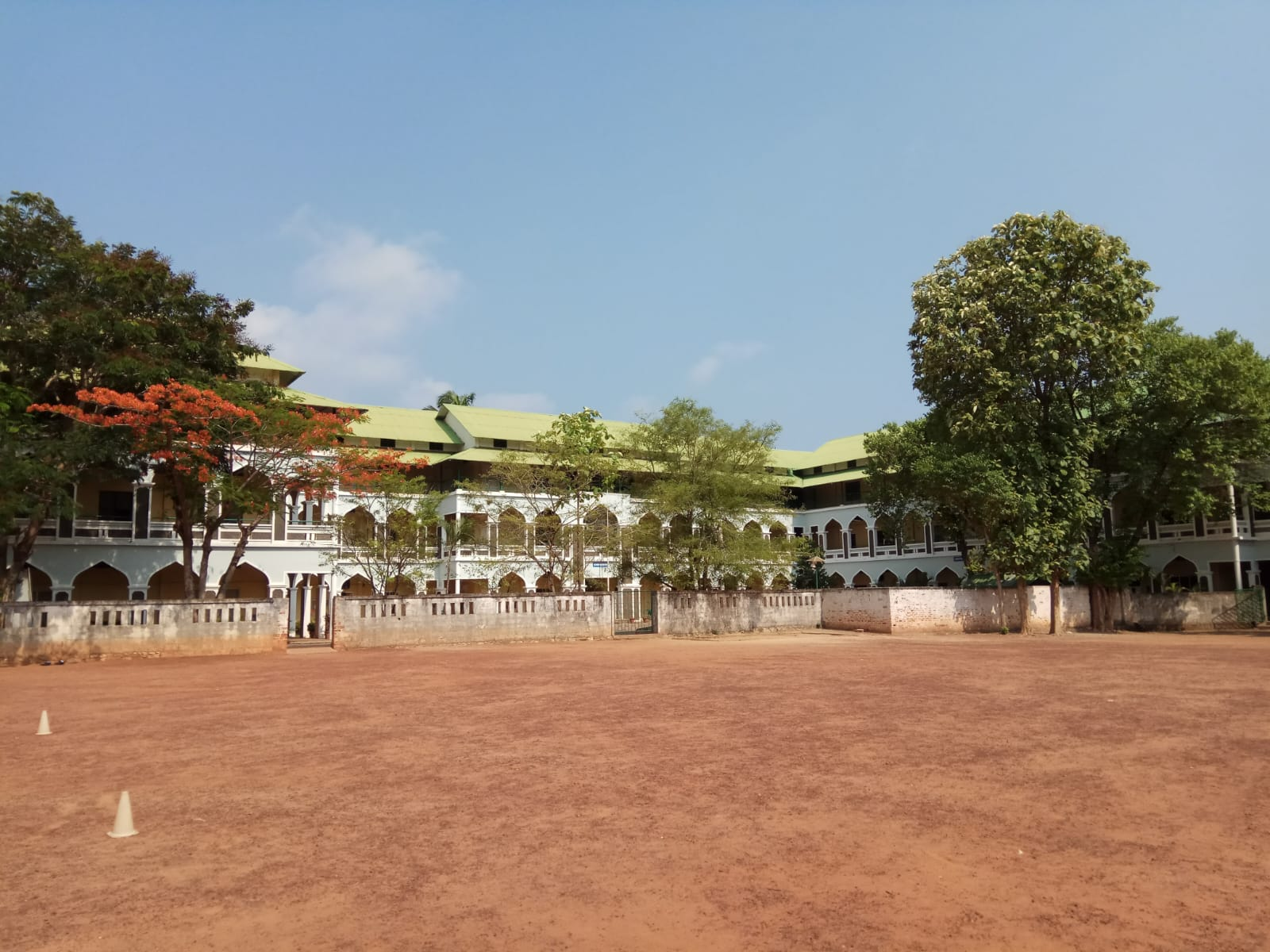
An image of TKMCPS, as seen from the school's playground.

Thangal Kunju Musaliar Centenary Public School (TKMCPS) is a coeducational school located in Karicode, in the Kundara block of the Kollam district of Kerala. Affiliated to the Central Board of Secondary Education (CBSE), the school offers classes for grades from 1 to 12, and also has primary and kindergarten sections. The school is managed by the Thangal Kunju Musaliar College Educational Trust, a registered society dedicated to educational initiatives in the region.

== History ==
The school was established in the academic year 1997-8 in commemoration of the birth centenary of the trust's founder, late Jb. A Thangal Kunju Musaliar-an educationalist, industrialist and philanthropist from Kollam. The school's formal inauguration was held on 12 June 1997 by Jb. Shahal Hassan Musaliar, the President of TKM College Trust. The school has been affiliated with the Central Board of Secondary Education (CBSE) since 2004, offering education from primary to senior secondary levels under affiliation number 930347, with the current extension valid until 31 March 2027. By the 2010s, the institution matured into a well-established co-educational school, building on its foundational years to support comprehensive student growth within the TKM network.

== Location ==
The school is situated on a 3.5-acre (14,164 sq. meters) campus within the TKM College complex in Karicode, a suburb located approx. 5 km away from the center of the historical coastal city of Kollam. The school's physical infrastructure is spread across four building blocks with a total built-up area of 9,014 square meters, and lies adjacent to the TKM College of Arts & Science, and the Thangal Kunju Musaliar College of Engineering.

== Infrastructure and Facilities ==
The school houses 90+ classrooms, 37 of which are equipped with smart class technology. The institution utilizes the TATA Class Edge program for web-based learning and Mooc. The campus includes a medical and health dispensary, and a canteen facility. The campus provides a 6,000-square-meter playground for outdoor sports and includes facilities for various indoor games. Dedicated spaces are available for performing arts, including dance and music studios, as well as a school auditorium for formal events and assemblies.

== In the news ==
On 14 August 2014, the school organized a massive national integration event titled 'Samarpan' to mark the 68th Independence Day of India. Approximately 6,000 students and staff members from various TKM institutions gathered on the school grounds to form a human representation of the Indian national flag. Participants held colored balloons to create the tricolor pattern and the Ashoka Chakra. The event was described in media reports as "the first of its kind in the country and the history of CBSE schools".

In the same week as the 'Samarpan' event, the school attracted media attention regarding its Independence Day eve celebrations. Reports indicated that the school management decided to exclude the national song, Vande Mataram, from the program. According to reports by The Indian Express and NDTV, the school management received a letter from the Social Democratic Party of India (SDPI) requesting the exclusion of the song, claiming it, along with the traditional Namaste gesture, allegedly conflicted with the religious beliefs of a section of the community.

While the school principal initially stated that the decision was made to avoid "stressing" the participating students and denied external pressure, SDPI leaders publicly confirmed they had approached the management with the request. The incident sparked protests from various political youth organizations in Kerala. In response to the controversy, the then-Chief Minister of Kerala, Oommen Chandy, ordered a probe into the matter to ascertain the facts.

The school has been visited by several high-profile dignitaries, including the former President of India, Dr. A. P. J. Abdul Kalam. During his visit, Dr. Kalam interacted with the students, emphasizing the importance of scientific temper and education.
