= Edakkidom =

- village
- Location in Kerala, India Edakkidom (India)
- Coordinates: 8°57′0″N 76°44′0″E
- Country: India
- State: Kerala
- District: Kollam
- Village: Kareepra, Ezhukone
- Block: Kottarakara

Government
  - Type: Village Administration

Languages
  - Official: Malayalam, English
- Time zone: UTC+5:30 (IST)
- Postal code: 691505
- Distance from Kollam: 21 kilometres (13 mi) north
- Distance from Ezhukone: 3 kilometres (1.9 mi)

Edakkidom is a village in the Kollam district, in the Indian state of Kerala, located about 21 km (13 mi) north of Kollam city. The main attraction is Thettikkunnil Sree Mahadevi Devaswam and pulichani cave.

== Geography ==
Edakkidom is located among many surrounding villages:

- Kottarakkara : 8.1 km
- Paravur : 23.3 km
- Ezhukone :3 km
- Kundara : 8.4 km
- Chathannoor : 14.8 km
- Odanavattom : 7.2 km
- Nedumankavu:5.8 km
- Ayoor:21.3 km
- Kadaikodu (3.2 km)

Some notable nearby settlements are Kollam, Kottarakkara, Ezhukone, Odanavattom, and Punalur.

== Demographics ==
This village has a majority population of Hindus.

== Economy ==
The primary occupations are in growing agricultural products, including rubber, black pepper, cashews, rice and plantain.

Other employers include Kareepra Cooperative Bank, Edakkidom & SupplyCo Maveli Store at KSN Building, Sodiac Tiles (BK Agencies), SLS wood industries, Mother rubber manufacturers. Rajan cashews, Ambalakara cashew factory, 11 KV Substation (KSEB) AM Junction Edakkidom North, S.R. Agencies and Chaithanya Digital Studio.

== Education ==
The primary school is Govt L.P. School Edakkidom. SNGSHS Kadaikode is an aided Sanskrit secondary school. Other schools include KNS memorial S N Central school (CBSE), St George vocational higher secondary school, Sree Sankara Sanskrit vidyapeetam (BA, MA in Sanskrit), S.S.V.U.P.S, Akshya computer education centre, vijanaodayam vayanasala and granthasala (Library )

== Temples ==
- Edakkidom Thettikkunil Sree Maha Devi Devaswam
- Munnur Indilayappan Temple
- Valayikkodu Karthikeyapuram Temple
- Gurunadan Mukal Temple
- Malanada Temple
- Mannoor Thevar vishnu temple
- Thevarpoyika Mahavishnu Temple Edakkidom.
- Nalannil Sree Nagaraja Kshethram, Valayikkodu, Edakkidom

== Government ==
Edakkidom is a part of the assembly constituency Kottarakara and Lok Sabha constituency Mavelikkara.CPI(M). The Indian National Congress, BJP is the major working political party.
