= Government Model Boys Higher Secondary School, Kollam =

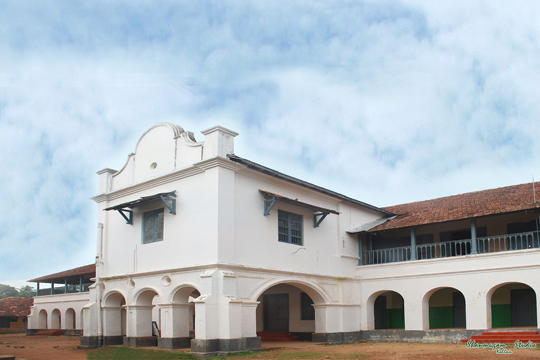

Location
- Kollam (Quilon), Kerala; India
- Coordinates: 8°53′41.74″N 76°34′40.4″E

Information
- Type: Higher secondary school
- Established: 1834
- Locale: Thevally
- Education system: Kerala State Board of Education
- Classes offered: Std 5 to 12

Government Model Boys Higher Secondary School is a residential school in Thevally, Kollam. This school is affiliated to Kerala State Board of Education and is one of the oldest schools in Kollam district.

== History ==
In 1834, the school was opened as His Highness Maharaja's English School at Thevally as a feeder primary school for the secondary school in the capital under an initiative led by Maharaja Swathi Thirunal Rama Varma of Travancore.

== Facilities ==
There are separate buildings for Primary Division, High school division, Higher Secondary, Vocational Higher Secondary Divisions and residential buildings which works as hostel for students from other districts. High school and Higher secondary divisions have separate Computer Labs and Hostel facilities. Broadband internet connections are available in this labs. There is also a Sasthraposhini Lab for Physics, Chemistry and Biology.

== Notable alumni ==
- A.A. Rahim
- Adoor Bhasi
- C. Keshavan
- Eugene Pandala
- Jayan
- Kadavoor Sivadasan
- Malayatoor Ramakrishnan
