= St. Aloysius Higher Secondary School =

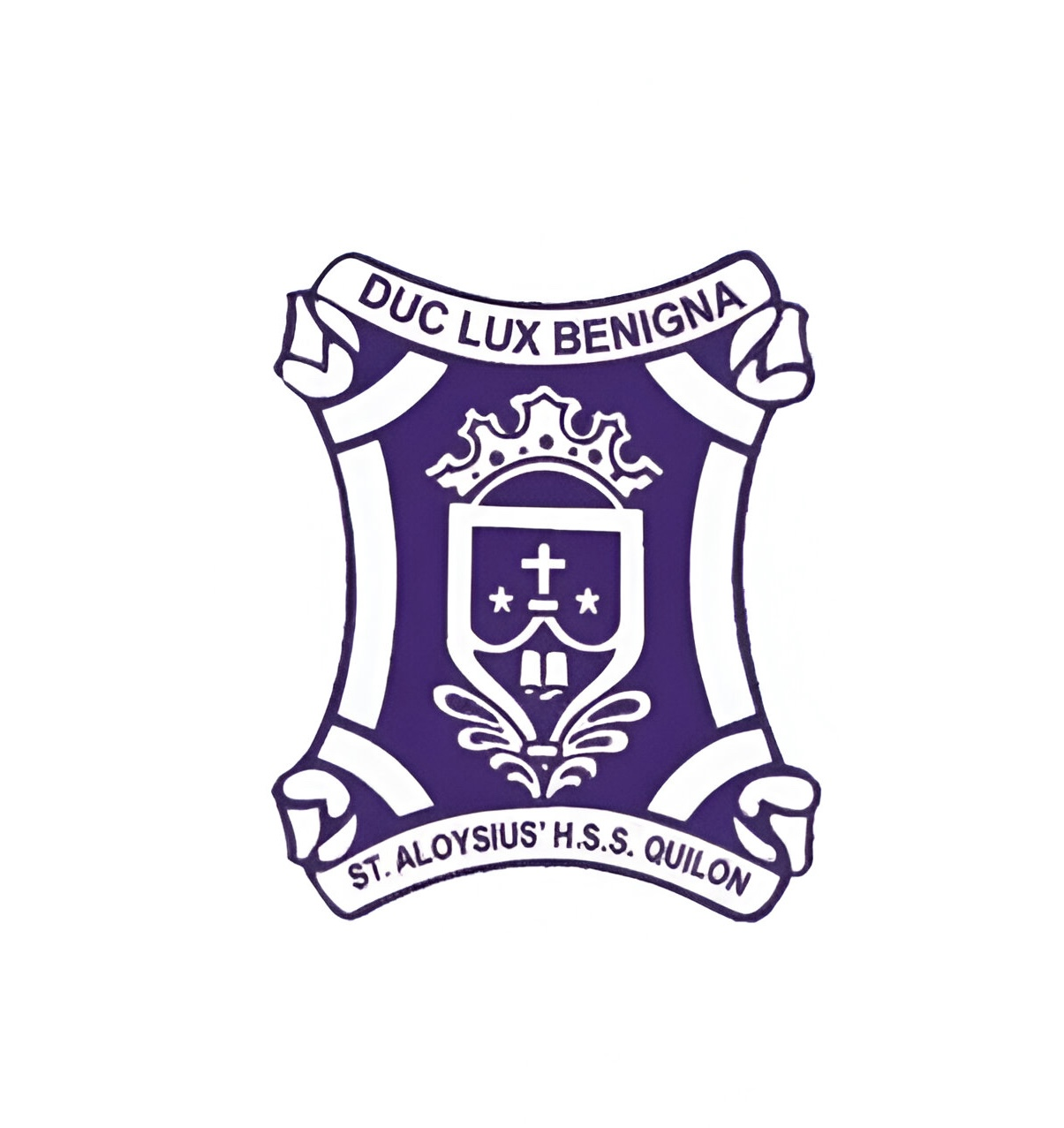

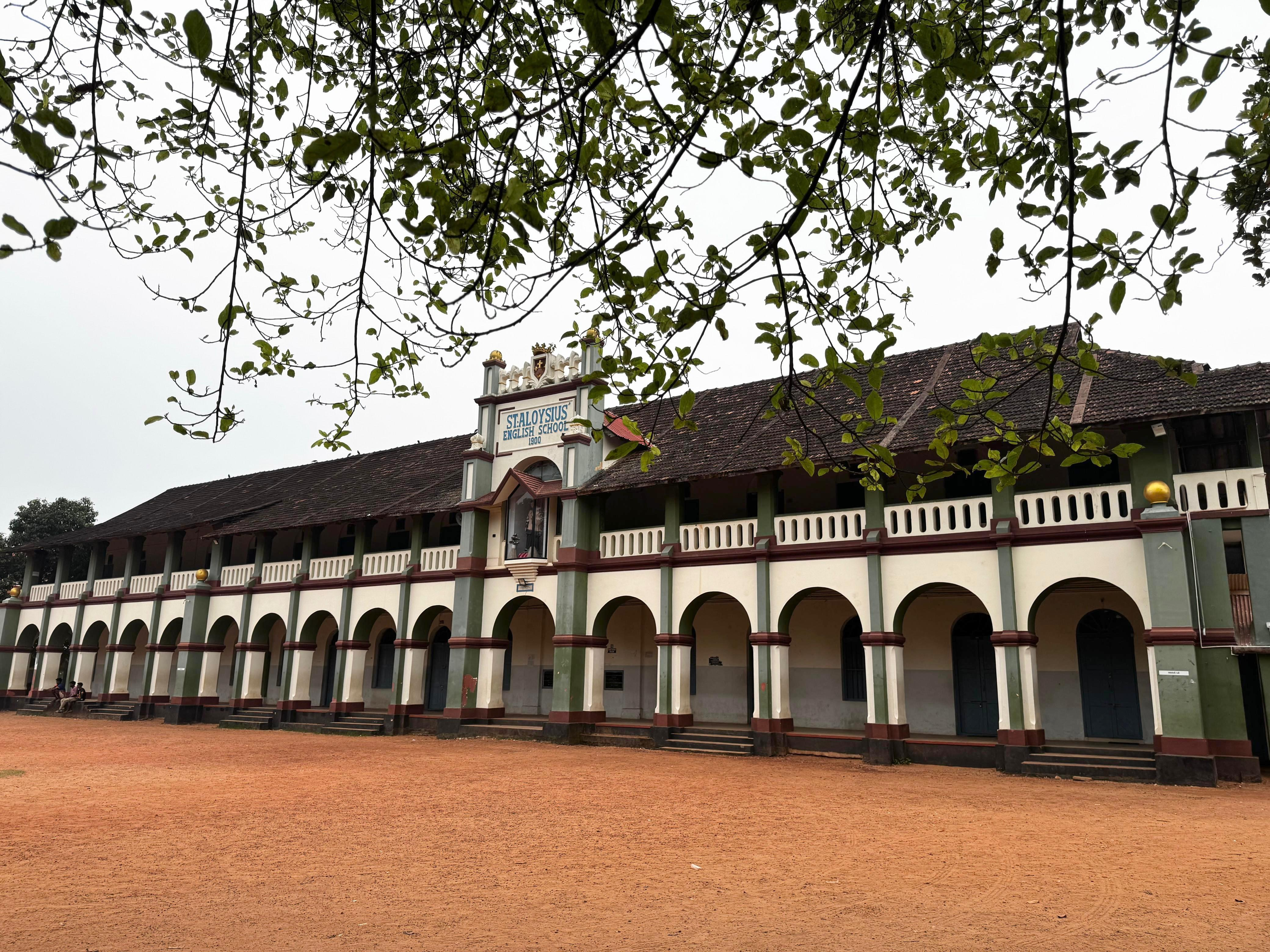

Location
- Thangassery Road, Vaddy; Kollam, Kerala, 691013; India
- Coordinates: 8°53′8″N 76°34′38″E

Information
- Former name: St. Aloysius' English School
- Funding type: Aided
- Motto: Duc Lux Benigna (അന്പോടെ നയിച്ചാലും ദീപമേ)
- Patron saint: Aloysius Gonzaga
- Established: 1897
- Founders: Irish brothers
- Status: Active
- School district: Kollam
- School code: 02067
- Gender: Mixed
- Classes offered: Fifth to Standard XII
- Language: English and Malayalam
- Campus size: 2 acres (8,100 m^{2})
- Sports: Basketball, Cricket, Football
- Nickname: St. Aloysius
- Affiliation: SSLC,Kerala; DHSE,Kerala

St Aloysius Higher Secondary School (formerly St Aloysius English School) is a Catholic high school located in the District of Kollam in the Roman Catholic Diocese of Quilon. It was founded by the Congregation of Christian Brothers in 1896, with the main building completed in 1900.

In 1932 it had 23 lay teachers and 479 pupils.

This school is located near to Vaddy beach, Kollam around the corner from Vaddy Church.

Nearly 4000 students study in this institution, which was upgraded to senior secondary school.

The main subjects in Higher secondary section are science, computer science and commerce.

The High School is currently co-educational.

== List of Headmasters ==
Sri. C T Thomas	
Br. Aloysius Brown	
Br. J J Creez	
Br. Thomas Ittikunnath	1947 - 1967
Sri. P Bastian William	1967 - 1987
Sri. Antony Francis Aradan	1987 - 1988
Sri. Morris Gomez	1988 - 1991
Sri. A Raphel	1991 - 1996
Sri. William Henry	1996 - 2005
Sri. Philipose A	2005 - 2006
Sr. Rosa Delema T E	2006 - 2013
Sri. Paul V Fernandez	2013 - 2014
Sri. Thomas Moor	2014 - 2017
Sri. Antony Robin	2017 - 2018
Sri. Ajith Joy	2018 - 2022
Sri. Sujith A T	2022 - 2025
Sri. Bernad R	2025 - Onwards

== Notable alumni ==
- C. Kesavan, former Chief Minister of Travancore-Cochin
- Bechu Kurian Thomas, Judge, High Court of Kerala
- Raja Vijayaraghavan V., Judge High Court of Kerala
- P.B. Suresh Kumar, Judge, High Court of Kerala
