= Mount Carmel Convent Anglo-Indian Girls High School =

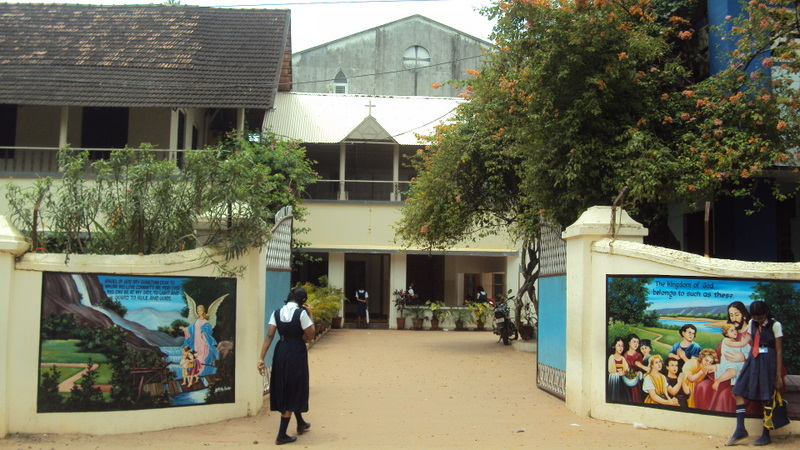
- Main Gate and Chapel of the school

Location
- Tangasseri, Kerala, India
- Coordinates: 8.8839°N 76.5650°E

Information
- Motto: Hold your light up high
- Established: 22 July 1885; 140 years ago
- School district: Kollam
- Classes offered: LKG to Standard XII
- Language: English
- Song: Flower of Carmel
- Publication: Carmeline
- Affiliation: CISCE
- Website: mcctangi.org

Mount Carmel Convent Anglo-Indian Girls High School is an English-medium all-through school in Tangasseri, Kollam District in Kerala, India. Located on the shores of the Arabian Sea, it consists of a day school, and a boarding house located within the convent. The school was founded on 22 July 1885 by Mother Veronica of the Passion. It was one of the first English-medium schools in the Kollam District, and is one of its two originally Anglo-Indian schools. The school awards qualifications based on the ICSE/ISC syllabus.

== History ==
The school was founded as The Mount Carmel European School by Mother Veronica of the Passion in July 1885 to promote English education of poor European girls in the Quilon district. It was originally situated in a small bungalow by the beach in Tangasseri, a town on the coast of the Arabian Sea, with ancient Portuguese, English and Dutch settlements, and a once-thriving Anglo-Indian community. The school was inaugurated by Ferdinand Ossi, Bishop of Quilon, as was the convent to which it was associated, on 22 July 1885. In 1889, it was recognised by the Madras Presidency as a 'European Convent School'. It became a high school in 1914. The school was one of the only two employers of Anglo-Indian women in Tangasseri in the mid 20th century, the other being the nearby Infant Jesus Anglo-Indian Boys' High School. The establishment changed its name to Mount Carmel Convent Anglo-Indian Girls School when India gained independence in 1947.

The school's syllabus prepared students for the Anglo-Indian High School Examination. The school later switched to the ICSE/ISC syllabus.

== Curricular and extracurricular activities ==
The school provides classes from LKG up to Class XII. The school offers education in subjects like Maths, Science, Economics and English, based on the ICSE/ISC curriculum. It offers Science and Commerce streams at the higher secondary level. It also provides classes in extra-curricular activities like classical dance, music and karate. The core school hours are from 8:45am–3:45pm. The school also has religious classes in Catechism, Moral Science and Value Education. First Friday Holy Masses and rosary recitals are conducted for the Catholic students. Scapulars are also provided to the Catholics. Every year, the students from Classes VIII to X visit old age homes and provide alms to the poor.

The students are divided into four houses: Blue, Green, Red and Yellow. The Inter-House Cultural Fest, also known as the Youth festival, and the annual athletic meet fosters the competitive spirit and sportsmanship of the houses. There are clubs and groups like The Literary Club and The Eco Club. A science exhibition is held annually.

There are around 4000 students at the school. The school is affiliated to the Council for the Indian School Certificate Examinations.

The maiden alumni reunion of the institution, was held on 16 July 2011, on the feast day of Our Lady Of Mount Carmel. Styled Le Revenir (French for The Return), the function was inaugurated by Mrs. Lida Jacob, Chairperson of the Commission for Right to Education Act. The website of the school was launched by leading playback singer and former student Chitra Iyer, who was the celebrity guest.

The school motto is 'Hold Your Light Up High'.

Carmeline, the yearbook published by the school, has literary articles, poems, short stories in English, Malayalam and Hindi languages and artworks including pencil drawings, paintings and ink sketches featured in it.

== List of principals ==
Some of the former principals were:

- Sister Lawrence
- Sister Bertha
- Sister Mary Patricia, who was at the helm for nearly three decades, making her the longest-serving principal of the school
- Sister Mary Antoinette
- Sister Angel Thomas
- Sister Helen Louis
- Sister Pramila Fernandez
- Sister Elsy Paul

== Notable alumnae ==
- Ambika Pillai
- Chitra Iyer
