= Thangal Kunju Musaliar College of Engineering =

Educational institute in Kerala, India

Thangal Kunju Musaliar College of Engineering (Autonomous)
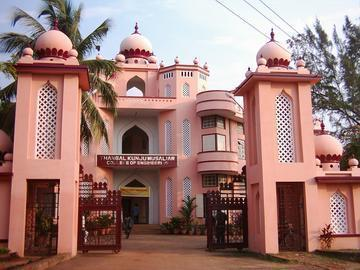
- Type: Government-Aided Autonomous Engineering College
- Established: 3 July 1958; 68 years ago
- Founder: Thangal Kunju Musliar
- Affiliations: Universities (Since 1958): 1. APJ Abdul Kalam Technological University (Since 2015); 2. University of Kerala (1958-2015)
- Chairman: T. K. Shahal Hassan Musaliar
- Principal: Dr. Sadiq
- Academic staff: 200
- Administrative staff: 500
- Students: 4000
- Location: Kollam, Kerala, 691005, India; 8°54′50″N 76°37′57″E
- Campus: Urban 25 acres (100,000 m^{2})
- Language: English, Malayalam
- Website: www.tkmce.ac.in

The Thangal Kunju Musaliar College of Engineering, commonly known as TKMCE, is the first government-aided engineering institution in the Indian state of Kerala, where its foundation stone was set on 2 February 1956, and was established and inaugurated on 3 July 1958. The campus is located in Karicode, approximately 6 kilometres (3.7 mi) away from Kollam, Kerala, India. The college was affiliated to Kerala University before transferring to APJ Abdul Kalam Technological University when it was formed in 2015. The UGC conferred autonomous status to the institution in 2022.

== History ==
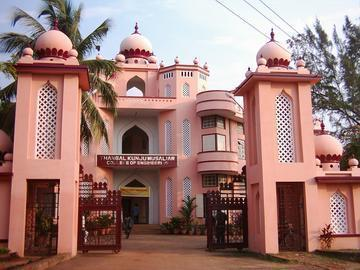
Entrance of Thangal Kunju Musaliar College of Engineering

The college was founded by the TKM Educational Trust, an organization established by Thangal Kunju Musaliar. The college's foundation stone was laid on 3 February 1956 by Rajendra Prasad, the first President of India, and was inaugurated by Humayun Kabir, the Cabinet Minister for Scientific and Cultural Affairs, on 3 July 1958. The institution then went on to become the first government-aided institution in the state of Kerala.

== Campus ==
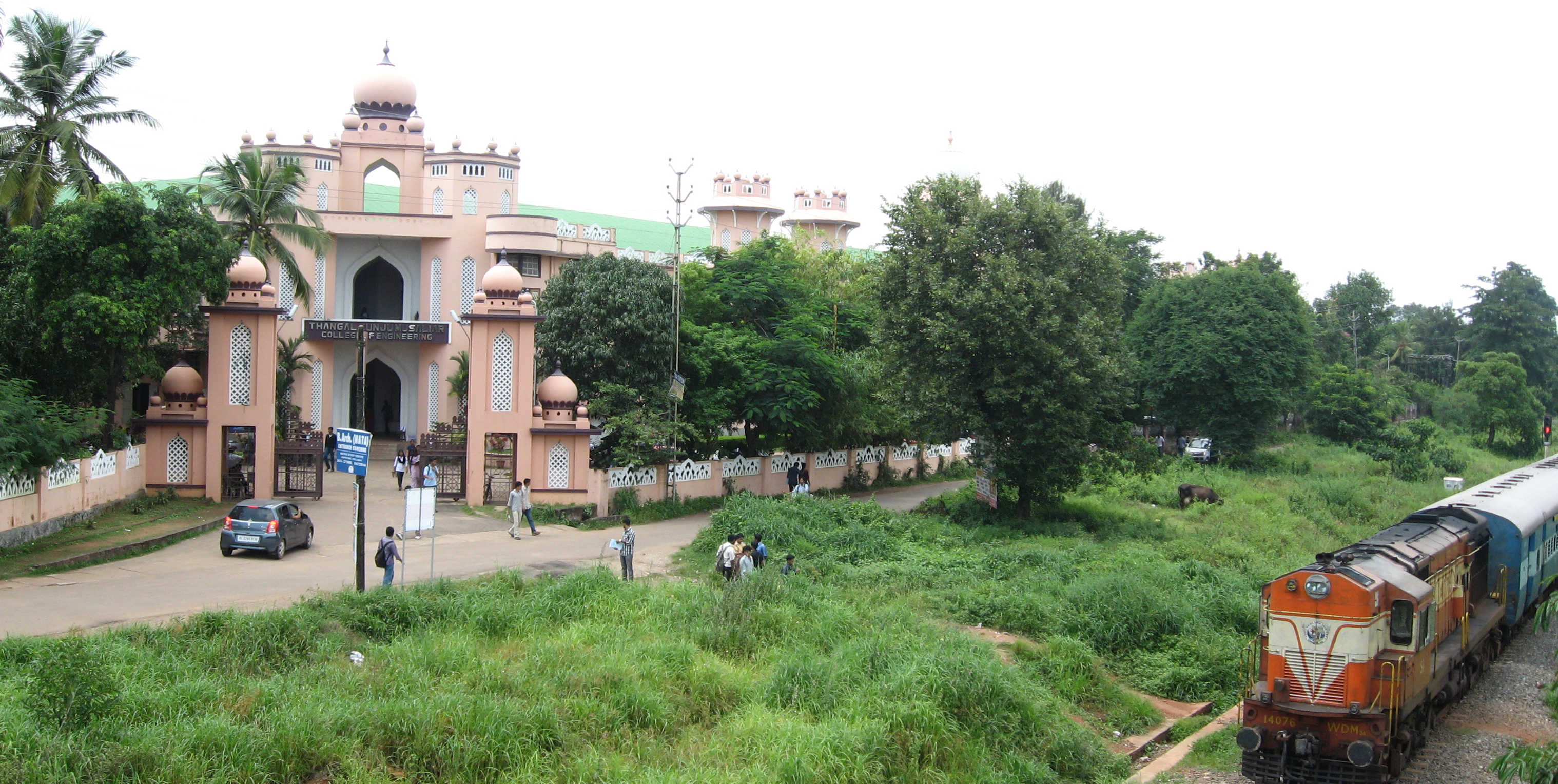
View of Kollam-Punalur Passenger Train passing by the college, near Kilikkollur stop.

The college is located at Karicode, a suburb town of the coastal city of Kollam on the Kollam- Sengottai NH-208 road. The college is 6 kilometres away from Kollam city centre (Chinnakada), and 2.2 kilometres from Kallumthazham junction.

== Organisation and administration ==
=== Governance ===
The administration of the college is vested in a Governing Body consisting of representatives of the T.K.M College Trust, Govt: Of Kerala, and All India Council for Technical Education. The Governing Body is headed by S.H.Musaliar as chairman and the Principal as the Ex-officio secretary.

=== Departments ===
- Dept. of Computer Science and Engineering
- Dept. of Electrical and Computer Engineering
- Dept. of Electronics and Communication Engineering
- Dept. of Electrical and Electronics Engineering
- Dept. of Mechanical Engineering
- Dept. of Civil Engineering
- Dept. of Chemical Engineering
- Dept. of Mechanical-Production Engineering
- Dept. of Architecture
- Dept. of MCA
- Dept. of Mathematics
- Dept. of Physics
- Dept. of Chemistry
- Dept. of Economics
- Dept. of Physical Education
- Center for Artificial Intelligence

=== Facilities ===
The college has a central library. As of 2025, It houses about 94,982 books, 10,149 E-journals, 203,469 E-books and 55 periodicals.

== Academics ==
The institute offers BTech programs in eight branches of engineering, five MTech programs and a Computer Applications (MCA) Program.

=== Accreditation and affiliation ===
TKMCE was accredited by the National Assessment and Accreditation Council with a validity up to November 2021. Ten programmes are approved by the All India Council for Technical Education (AICTE) for 2019–2020, some which are accredited by the National Board of Accreditation (NBA). The programmes are affiliated with APJ Abdul Kalam Technological University.

=== Admission ===
- Post Graduation

Admission to MCA is based on the Kerala LBS Entrance Examination, conducted by the Office of LBS Exams run by the Government of Kerala.

Admission to MTech is based on Graduate Aptitude Test in Engineering (GATE).

- Under Graduation Admission to undergraduate courses is based on the Kerala Engineering Architecture Medical (KEAM), administered by the Government of Kerala, India. Some seats are reserved for students from Arunachal Pradesh, Andaman and Lakshadweep, and also in the management quota.
- PhD candidates are admitted as per APJ Abdul Kalam Technological University norms.

=== Sports ===
- Football Ground
- Cricket Pitch
- Indoor Badminton Court
- Basketball Court
- Tennis Court
- Volleyball court

== Student life ==
=== TEDxTKMCE ===
A TEDx event was organised by students of TKMCE, Kollam on 11 August 2018. The theme of the event was "Alchemy".

=== College Clubs ===
The college has a variety of different clubs, each pertaining to various interests and fields. A few notable ones include:

- IEEE TKMCE Chapter
- IEI TKMCE
- MUNSOC TKMCE
- SAE TKMCE Chapter
- ASCE TKMCE
- ISHRAE TKMCE
- CSI TKMCE

== Alumni ==
The alumni association was formed in 1963. It has chapters in various states of India and around the world. Notable alumni include:

- Soorya Krishnamoorthy, Indian artist, Philanthropist and Scientist.
- Justice Raja Vijayaraghavan V., Judge, Kerala High Court.
- M. Jayachandran, film score composer, singer, and musician.
- S. Somanath, Chairman of Indian Space Research Organization (ISRO)
- Shibu Baby John, former Labour Minister of the State Government of Kerala.
- T. K. Alex, former director of Indian Space Research Organisation Satellite Centre (ISAC).
- Suraj Mani, Indian rock musician.

== See also ==
- National Institute of Technology Calicut
- College of Engineering Trivandrum
- Mar Athanasius College of Engineering
- NSS College of Engineering
- Educational Institutions in Kollam District
