= Azeezia Medical College =

College in Kerala, India

Azeezia Medical College, Kollam
- Other name: AMCH
- Type: Private
- Established: 2008
- Affiliations: National Medical Commission
- Academic affiliations: Kerala University of Health Sciences
- Chairman: M. Abdul Azeez
- Principal: Dr. K. Sasikala
- Location: Meeyannoor, Kollam, Kerala, India; 8°53′23.96″N 76°44′12.24″E
- Beds: 690
- Website: www.azeezia.com

Azeezia Medical College Hospital is a private hospital located in Kerala. It is a 690-bed multi-specialty hospital. The hospital provides treatment in various specialties, such as medicine, surgery, obstetrics and gynecology, dermatology, psychiatry, pediatrics, orthopedics, ophthalmology, otolaryngology, anesthesiology, radiology, emergency services, and laparoscopic surgery. Super-specialty departments include cardiothoracic, neurology, nephrology, pulmonology, gastroenterology, endocrinology, and neurosurgery. The private medical college includes super-specialty units and colleges for medical, dental, and nursing courses. The campus is in a rural area eight km (5.0 mi) from NH-47 (Kollam-Thiruvananthapuram portion).

== Location ==
Azeezia group of medical educational institutions is situated at Meeyannoor village, eight km (5.0 mi) from Kollam city.

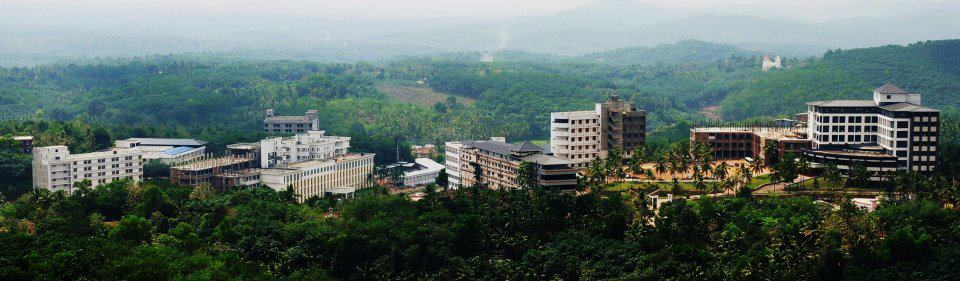
Azeezia Institute of Medical Science and Research

== Azeezia Medical College Hospital ==
Azeezia Medical College Hospital is a private 690-bed care teaching hospital with multi-specialty and disciplines of the expanding medical horizon students .

== See also ==
- List of medical colleges in India
- AIIMS
- JIPMER
- PGIMER Chandigarh
- CMC Vellore
- Government Medical College, Thiruvananthapuram
