= Thangal Kunju Musaliar =

Indian industrialist (1897–1966)

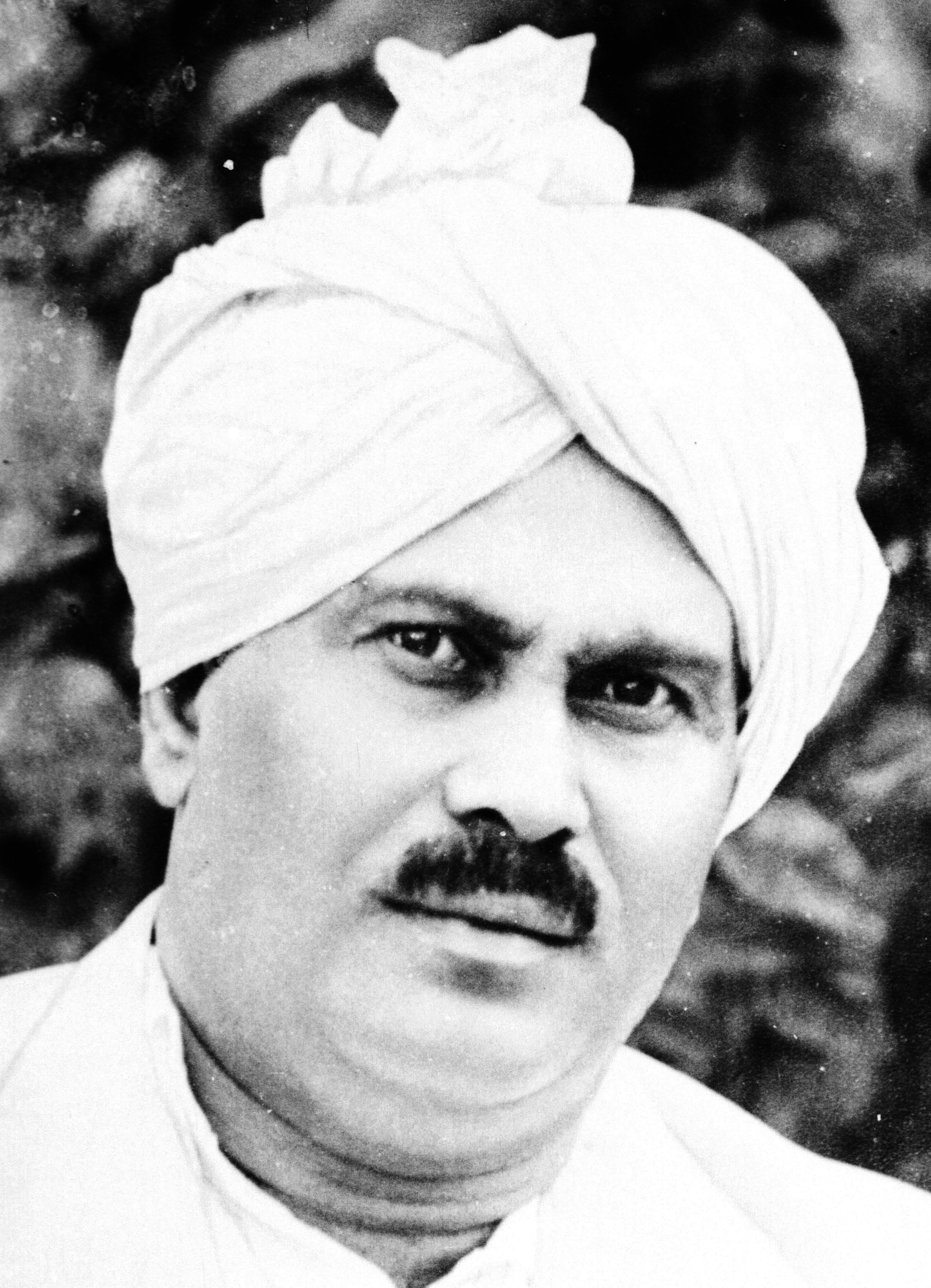
- Born: January 12, 1897; Kollam
- Died: February 19, 1966 (aged 69)
- Occupations: Industrialist, educationalist and visionary

Thangal Kunju Musaliar (January 12, 1897 - February 19, 1966) was an industrialist, educationalist and visionary, known for his contributions to the cashew industry, and higher education in the state of Kerala, India.

== Family ==
He was born as son of Ahmed Kunju Musaliar at Kollam district of Kerala on 12 January 1897.It was a middle-class family that traces its ancestry to Malik ibn Deenar, Persian scholar and traveler who came to India in the 8th century. He had three wives namely Khadeeja Kunju, Nabeesa Beevi and Ayisha Beevi and twenty one children. His children are prominent businessmen, technocrats and academics. His grandson Malik Kutty is a Plastic Surgeon in Houston, TX in the USA.

== Cashew business ==
After travelling to Sri Lanka, Brunei, Singapore and Malaysia for employment, he returned home and started a cashew processing unit, which became successful. In early 1940's he purchased raw cashew from small scale farmers, and supplied the kernels to industrialists after processing. He then set up the first full-fledged cashew factory in Kerala. The company "A.Thangal Kunju Musaliar and Sons Private Limited" was incorporated in Kerala on 10 Jun, 1946. In the 1940s, Musaliar had 26 cashew units and is believed to have employed around 25,000 to 30,000 people directly. He was called the "Cashew King" in national and international markets, and Fortune magazine named him as the single biggest individual employer in the world, at the time.

== Publishing and education ==
He set up a book publishing house Vignana Poshini, and in 1944 started a weekly newspaper Prabhatham, which was later on made a daily. He authored multiple books in Malayalam including Prayogikadwaitam, translated to English as Man and the world, practical philosophy and law of nature., by S Sathyavageeswara Iyer.

In 1956, Musaliar formed the TKM Educational Trust to cater for the educational needs of the people of Kerala. The Trust established institutions such as TKM College of Engineering, TKM College of Arts and Science, TKM Institute of Technology, TKM Institute of Management, TKM Secondary School, T.K.M. Centenary Public School and the TKM School of Architecture.

== Legacy ==
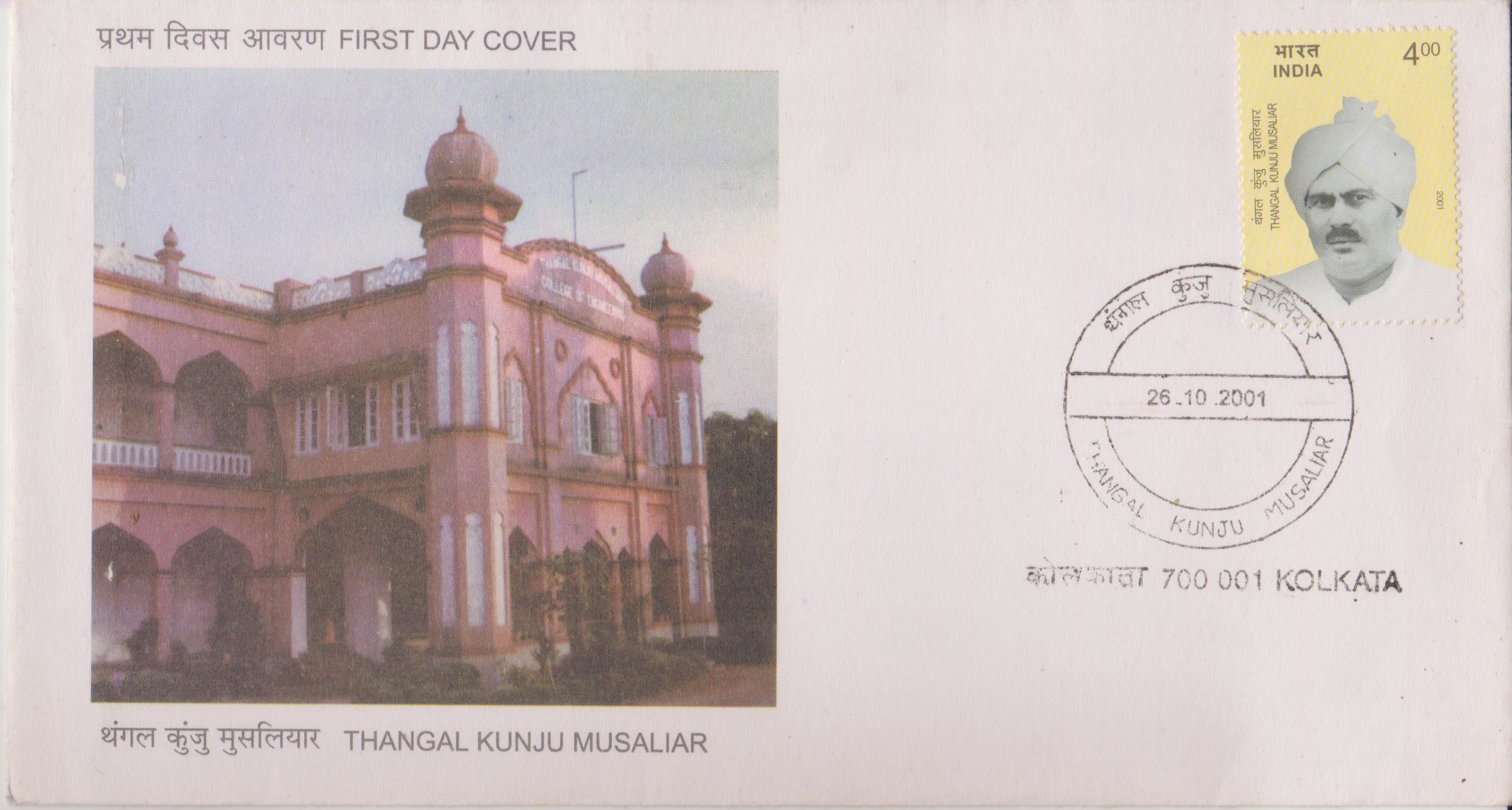
Postage stamp and First Day Cover issued by the Indian Government in 2001.

India Post issued a commemorative stamp on Musaliar on 26 October 2001.

A biography of Thangal Kunju Musaliar was written by P. Meerakutty in Malayalam, titled A. Thangal Kunju Musaliar.

== Family businesses ==
The descendants of Musaliar has carried forwarded his legacy in business and have expanded themselves into various sectors beyond cashew. Few of these ventures were out of vision laid out by Musaliar. The major ventures managed by the family today are.

- Supreme Foods - a chain of 12 bakeries and five restaurants that started at Kollam in 1984 and is spread across Kollam, Thiruvananthapuram and Kochi today.
- Hycount Pipes - started by Musaliar's son in law M. K. A. Hameed.
- Grand and Prince Theatres at Kollam.
