= Chathannoor =

- Town
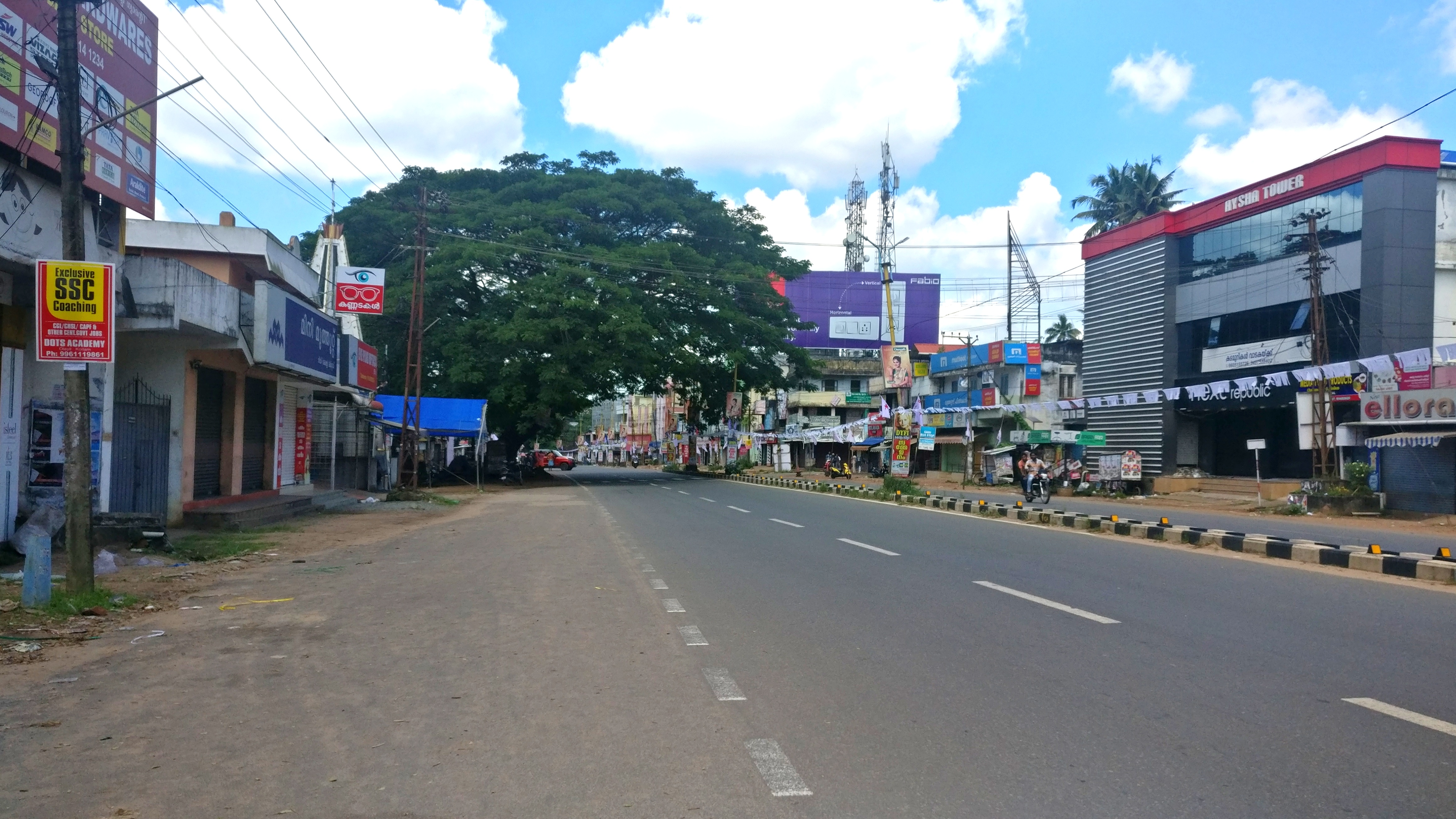
- Chathannoor Town

- Location in Kerala, India
- Coordinates: 8°51′24″N 76°43′5″E
- Country: India
- State: Kerala
- District: Kollam

Languages
  - Official: Malayalam, English
- Time zone: UTC+5:30 (IST)
- PIN: 691572
- Telephone code: 0474-259*** & 0474-2059***
- Vehicle registration: KL-02
- Nearest city: Kollam (16 km)
- Literacy: 88%

Chathannoor is a town in the Indian state of Kerala situated at the Kollam District on the banks of Ithikkara River. It is about 16 km (9.9 mi) from Kollam(Quilon) City. Chathannoor is around 55 km (34 mi) north of the state capital Thiruvananthapuram(Trivandrum).

== Geography ==
Chathannoor is located at 8°51′24″N 76°43′5″E. Chathannoor is well connected to other parts of Kerala by road especially by NH66(formerly NH47). National Highway 66 which connects Panvel, (Mumbai) and Kanyakumari and passes through the centre of Chathannoor Town. Residents of Chathannoor rely mostly on Kollam Railway station which is 16 km (9.9 mi) from the town and is well connected by buses, though the nearest railway Station is Paravur, The nearest airport is Thiruvananthapuram International Airport which is about 52 km (32 mi) from the town center. The KSRTC sub centre in Chathannoor offers inter-district services and local services for adjacent villages like Paravur, Chirakkara, Ooyor etc.. FP services to Kottayam, Mundakkayam, Kumili etc are also run by KSRTC.

Tourist destination Polachira can be reached by travelling 4 km to the south from town centre. Poothakulam elephant camp is located at Chirakkarathazham, just one km away from Polachira.

The KSRTC bus station and the newly started mini civil station are located at a distance of about one kilometre from Chathannoor junction while travelling towards Trivandrum.

Proximity to Hospitals like KIMS, Azeezia, HolyCross, Kollam Medical College, connectivity to other parts of the district and proximity to reputed educational institutions is increasing Chathannoor's demand as a major residential area in the district.

== Politics ==
Chathanoor town comes under Kollam (Lok Sabha constituency). Chathannoor assembly constituency includes one Municipality, Paravur, and six other panchayaths namely Adichanalloor, Chathannoor, Kalluvathukkal, Chirakkara, Poothakkulam and Pooyappally. B.B.Gopakumar is the present M.L.A.(2026-incumbent) representing Chathannoor in Kerala Legislature Assembly.

Year	MLA	Party	Alliance
2026	B.B.Gopakumar	BJP	NDA
2021	G. S. Jayalal	CPI	LDF
2016	G. S. Jayalal	CPI	LDF
2011	G. S. Jayalal	CPI	LDF
2006	N. Anirudhan	CPI	LDF
2001	G.Prathapa Varma Thampan	INC	UDF
1996	P. Ravindran	CPI	LDF
1991	C. V. Padmarajan	INC	UDF
1987	P. Ravindran	CPI	LDF
1982	C. V. Padmarajan	INC	UDF
1980	J. Chitharanjan	CPI	LDF
1977	J. Chitharanjan	CPI	LDF
1970	P. Ravindran	CPI	LDF
1967	P. Ravindran	CPI	LDF
1965	THANKAPPAN PILLAI	IND	IND

== Important Offices/Institutions ==
Chathannoor Grama Panchayat office, Ithhikkara Block Office, KSRTC Sub Depot Chathannoor. Sub Treasury Chathannoor, Village Office of Meenadu Village, Excise Office, Family Health Cente, AEO Office, Electricity Office (KSEB) Spl Tahasildar Office Land acquisition for NHA, I Post Office. BSNL Exchange, Agriculture Office, Govt Homeo Dispensary, Chathannoor Police station, Chathannoor Assistant Commissioner of Police Office, District Police Forensic office, Kerala Water Authority Office PWD Office PWD Guest house, Sub Registrar Office.

== Temples/churches ==
The cultural identity of the location is associated with two ancient and prominent Hindu temples Sree Bhoothanatha Temple and Chenamath Mahadeva Temple out of which the annual festival of Sree Bhoothanatha Temple is celebrated with greater intensity. The annual festival of Sree Bhoothanatha temple is famous for the event called "Eduppukuthira" . Recently the youth have started using the pictures of "Eduppukuthira" as a geographical identity.

- Chathannoor Sree Boothanatha Temple
- Kanjiramvila Bhagavathi Temple
- Ananthagiri Sree Subramanya Swamy Temple Thazham
- Chennamath Shiva Temple
- Vayalunada Bhagavathi Temple
- Varinjam Sree Subramanya Swamy Temple
- Sree Madankave Temple Uramvila
- Meenadu Sree dharmashastha Temple
- Kollakkuzhi Sree Bhaghavathi TempleVarinjam Sree Mahadevar Temple
- Pattupana devi temple koippadu
- Sree Koshnakavu Temple, Edanadu, Chathannoor
- Krungal Valluval Kadiyathi Temple, Kurungal Chathannoor
- Chathannoor Masjid Thirumukku
- Assemblies of God Church
- India Pentecostal Church of God
- St. Thomas Malankara Catholic Church
- St. George Orthodox Church (Valiya palli)
- Immanuel Marthoma Church
- Baptist Bible College and Church Karamcode
- InChrist Church
- Church of South India(LMS School) Karamcode

== See also ==
- Koippadu
- Chathannoor Assembly constituency - Wikipedia
- B.B. Gopakumar Chathannoor MLA
- https://kollam.nic.in/en/public-utility/chathannoor-post-office/ Post Office
