= Sree Sankaracharya University of Sanskrit =

Sanskrit university in India

- ശ്രീ ശങ്കരാചാര്യ സംസ്കൃത സർവകലാശാല
- Motto: ज्ञानादेव तु कैवल्यम् (Sanskrit)
- Motto in English: Liberation through knowledge
- Type: Public
- Established: 1993; 33 years ago
- Affiliations: UGC, NAAC, AIU.
- Chancellor: Governor of Kerala
- Vice-Chancellor: Prof. Ciza Thomas (In-charge)
- Pro Chancellor: Roji M. John; Minister for Higher Education, Government of Kerala
- Location: Kalady, Kerala, India; 10°10′13″N 76°26′19″E
- Website: ssus.ac.in

The Sree Sankaracharya University of Sanskrit (SSUS) is a Sanskrit university in India established in 1993 in Kalady, Kochi, Kerala. It was established when Indian Union Muslim League leader Sri. E.T. Muhammed Basheer was the Education Minister of Kerala. The foundation stone for the university was laid by Bharathi Tirtha Mahaswamiji of the Sringeri Sharada Peetham. SSUS provides education in Sanskrit, other Indian and foreign languages, Social Sciences and Fine Arts. It is accredited A+ by National Assessment and Accreditation Council (NAAC). The university has eight regional campuses across Kerala.

== Campus ==
The university functions through seven campuses, the main one at Kalady (main campus) and regional campuses at Thiruvananthapuram, Panmana, Ettumanoor, Tirur, Koyilandy and Payyannur. Most of these campuses are located in rural areas of the State, intending to serve people from disadvantaged backgrounds. More than ninety percent of the students and research scholars in the university are from economically and socially backward communities and families and more than seventy percent are women.

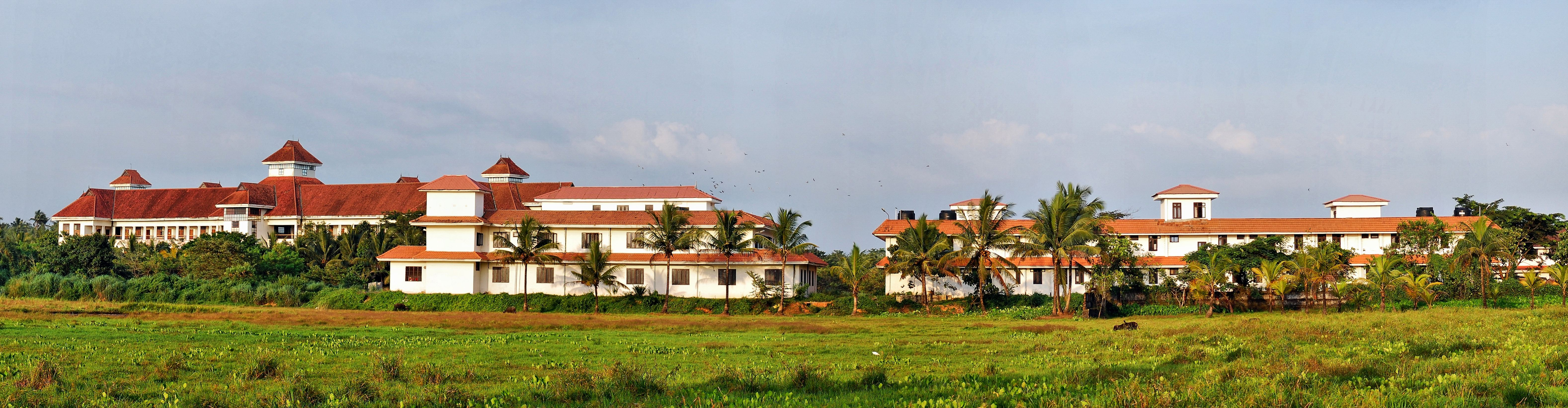
A panoramic view of Sree Sankaracharya University of Sanskrit, Kalady with Traditional Kerala-style architecture

== Organisation and administration ==
=== Departments ===
The university consists of the following departments.

- Sanskrit Vedanta
- Sanskrit Sahitya
- Sanskrit Vyakarna
- Sanskrit Nyaya
- Sanskrit General
- English
- Geography
- Hindi
- History
- Malayalam
- Music
- Painting
- Philosophy
- Political Science
- Psychology
- Arabic
- Ayurveda
- Economics
- Dance
- Education
- School of Vedic Studies
- Social Work
- Sociology
- Theatre
- Urdu
- Vastuvidya

=== Former Vice-Chancellors ===
SL. No.	Name	Took office	Left office
1	R. Ramachandran Nair	1994	1996
2	N. P. Unni	1996	2000
3	K. N. Panikkar	2000	2004
4	K. S. Radhakrishnan	2004	2008
5	J. Prasad	2008	Unknown
6	Dharmarajan P. K.	2017	2021
7	M. K. Jayaraj (acting)	2021	2022
8	M. V. Narayanan	2022	2023
9	Geetha kumari K	2023	2026
10	Prof. Ciza Thomas	2026	

== Academics ==
=== Academic programmes ===
The university has twenty six PhD programmes, twenty MPhil programmes, twenty four PG programmes, ten UG programmes, two PgD programmes, one Diploma programme and nine certificate programmes offered by the twenty-four academic departments. The Choice Based Credit and Semester System (CBCSS) was introduced in 2005 in SSUS. In 2018, the university implemented the system of Outcome Based Teaching, Learning and Evaluation (OBTLE) at the Post graduate level, becoming the first university in Kerala to introduce OBTLE. In 2021, the university becomes a part of KALNET, a shared platform for academic resources of libraries, developed by Kerala State Higher Education Council. The university's postgraduate programme in Museology will be launched in 2021.

=== Accreditation ===
The University Grants Commission has recognized the university with 2(f) status in 1994 and 12(B) status in 2005. On 31 August 2021, the university was accredited by NAAC with A+ grade, the first University in Kerala and the first Sanskrit University in the country to earn the achievement. In September 2014, the university was accredited by NAAC with A grade, the first University in Kerala to receive the grade in the first cycle of accreditation.

== Notable people ==
=== Alumni ===
- Surabhi Lakshmi, Malayalam movie actress
- Dileesh Pothan, film director, actor and producer in Malayalam cinema
- Grace Antony, film actress
- V. P. Sanu, politician
- Renu Soundar, Malayalam film and television actress
- Hima Shankar, film and theatre artist
- Sneha Sreekumar, actress and dancer
- R. L. V. Ramakrishnan, Classical dancer, Professor & Film Actor
- Vijilesh Karayad, Malayalam film actor
- M. Vijin, politician, MLA of Kalliasseri
- V K Sanoj, Member of the Kerala Legislative Assembly
- B. B. Gopakumar, Member of Kerala Legislative Assembly from Chathannoor

=== Faculty ===
- Sunil P. Ilayidom, Professor at Malayalam department
- G. Gangadharan Nair, former professor

== Campus ==
Kalady Campus

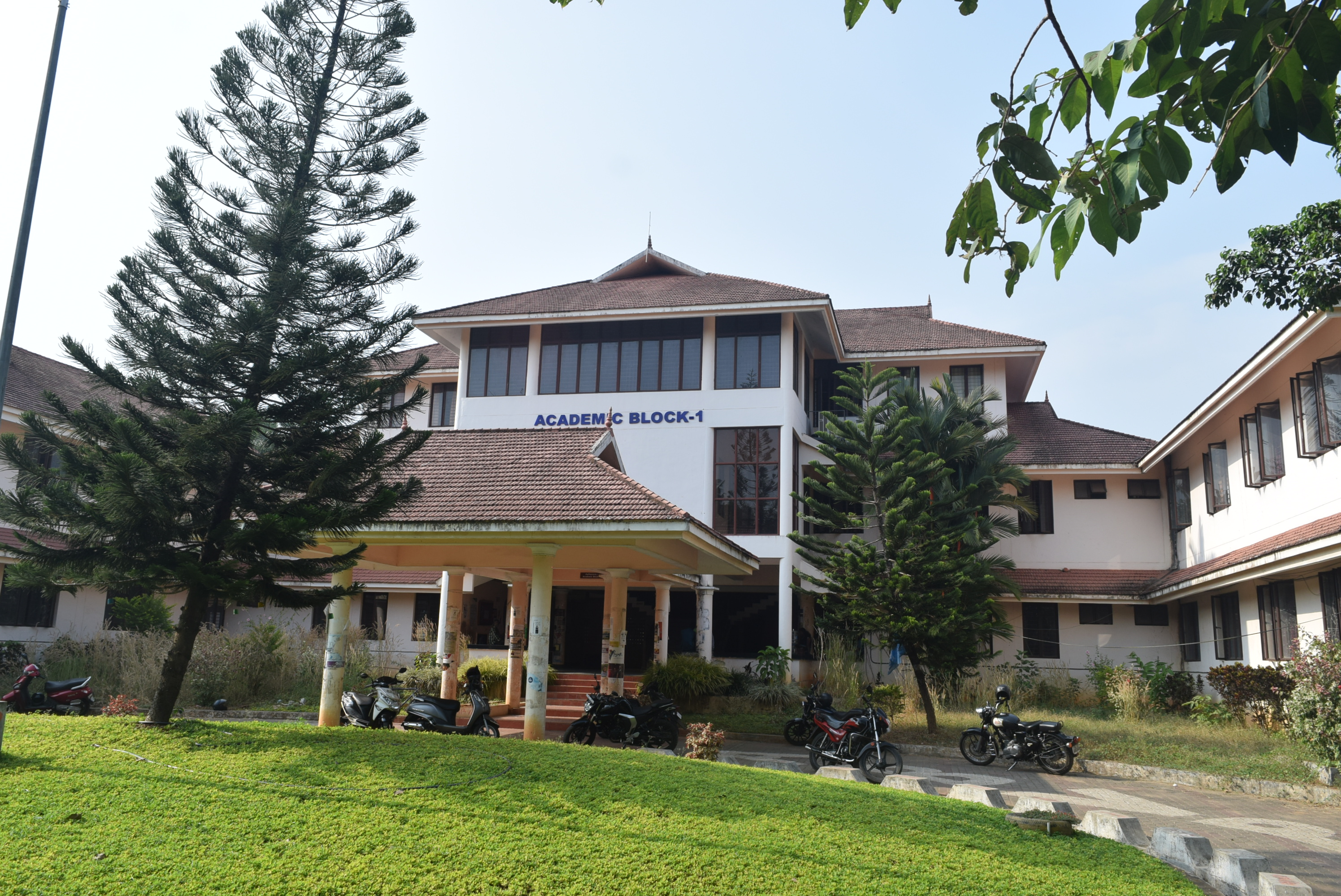
Academic Block

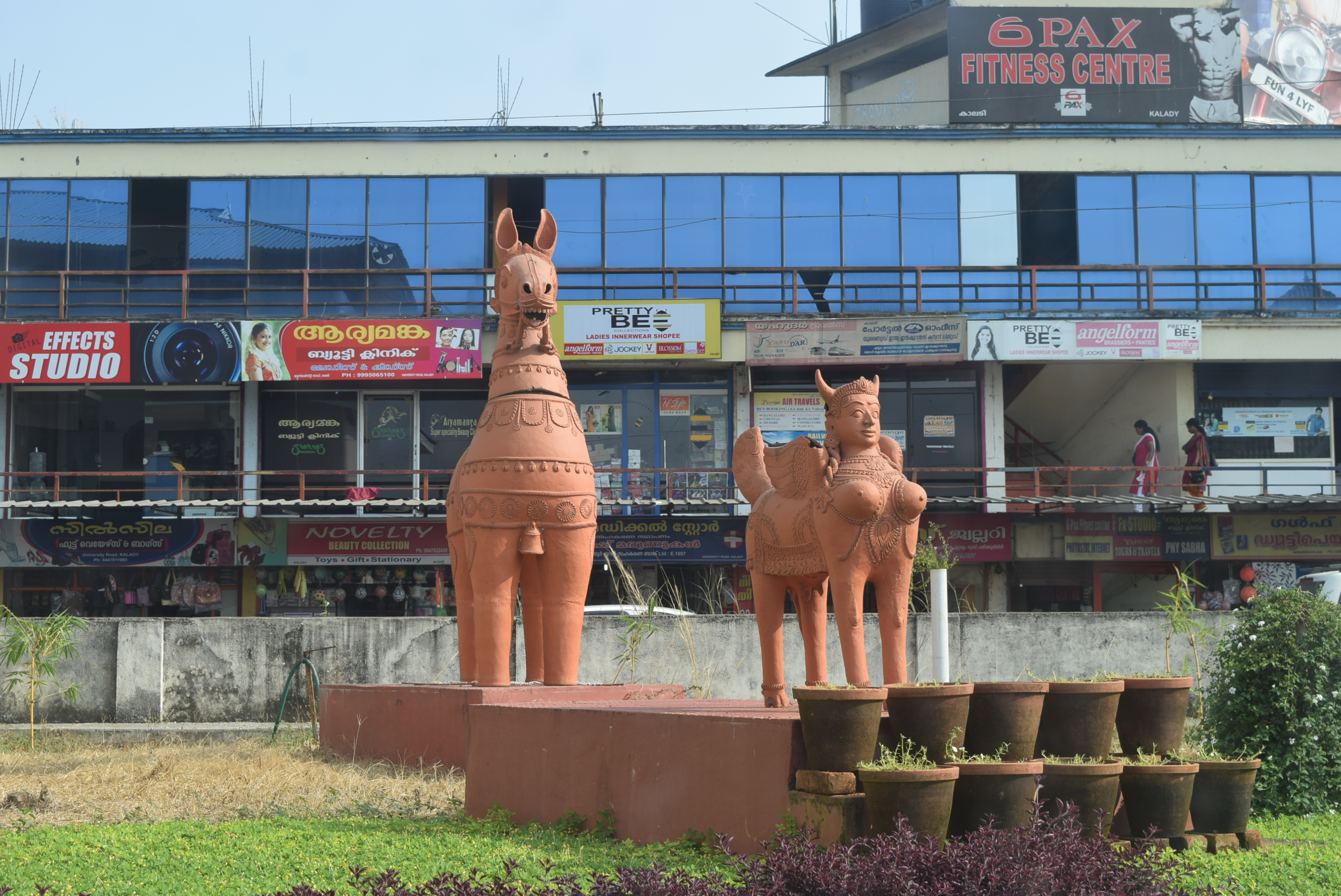
Sculptures

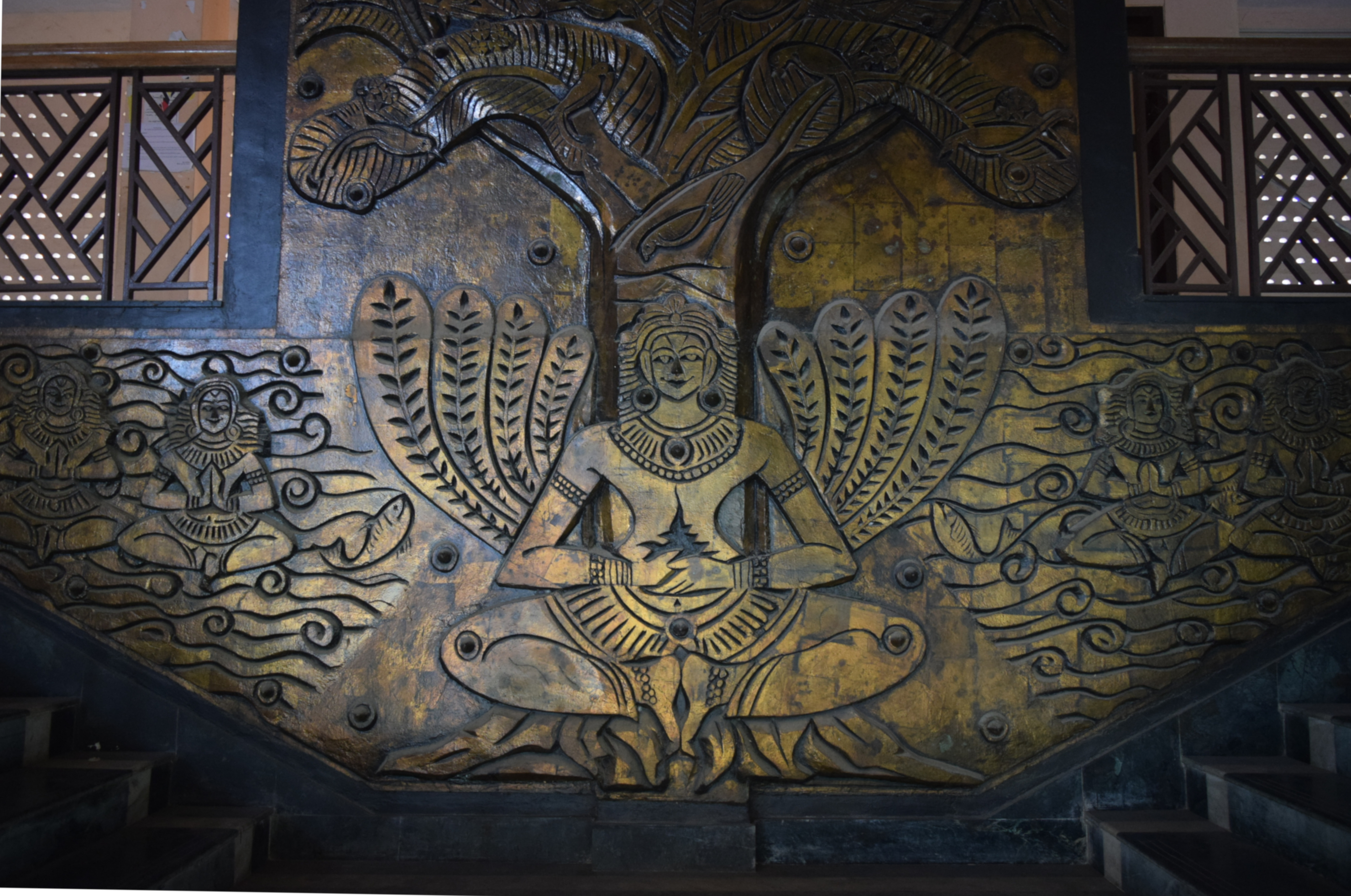
Wood Art

== See also ==
- Adi Shankara
- List of Sanskrit universities in India
- Sanskrit revival
