= Vilappuram =

Village in Kollam District, Kerala, India

'Vilappuram' is a small place in northwest of Chirakkara Grama Panchayath of Kollam district (Kerala, India) and 3 km towards south from Chathannoor town. The developing tourist spot "Polachira" is only 1 km towards south from here.

== Festivals ==
Vilappuram Bhagavathy Temple which has a "Urulu Nerch" in early morning on its main festival. The temple is owned by SNDP Sakha Yogam.

== Libraries ==
Anandavilasam Grandhasala, which is a "A" Grade library affiliated to Kerala State Library Council, Nehru Yuva Kendra and State Youth Welfare Board. This library has a multi-storied building, 1300 members, 15000 books, separate children's wing, computer facilities, mini theatre, P.S.C. corner.
