= Thiru Aarattu Madannada, Mylakkadu =

Thiru Aarattu Madannada Temple
- Thiru Aarattu Madannada Temple, Mylakkadu, Kollam, Kerala

Religion
- Affiliation: Hinduism
- District: Kollam
- Deity: Shiva
- Festival: Uchara Maholsavam

Location
- Location: Mylakkadu
- State: Kerala
- Country: India
- Interactive map of Thiru Aarattu Madannada Temple
- Coordinates: 8°51′59.0″N 76°41′41.6″E

Architecture
- Elevation: 31.33 m (103 ft)

Thiru Aarattu Madannada is a temple dedicated to Shiva in Kollam district, in Kerala in the peninsular India. The temple is situated in Mylakkadu. The temple is located on the National Highway 47 between Chathannur and Kottiyam near Mylakkadu. In the ancient temple, Lord Shiva resides under a pine tree. The festival of this temple is well known in the Kollam district as it has a history going back centuries.

== Uchara Maholsavam ==
Uchara Maholsavam festival day in Kerala is well-known, especially in Kollam district.

Uchara Maholsavam is considered as half of Onam on Makaram 28. It is a traditional festival in the temple. Thirumudi Ezhunnallath is the main attraction of Uchara. On this occasion, the priest of the temple, who carries the jewels wearing a valuable hat starts his barefoot walk from Peringapuram.

== Way to the Temple ==
You can reach the temple through Mylakkadu and Ithikkara. Kollam Junction railway station and Paravur Railway Station are the nearest railway stations.

== Location ==
This temple is located with the geographic coordinates of 8°51′59.0″N 76°41′41.6″E at an altitude of about 31.33 m above the mean sea level.

== See also ==
- The temple's blog
