= Mylakkadu =

- Village
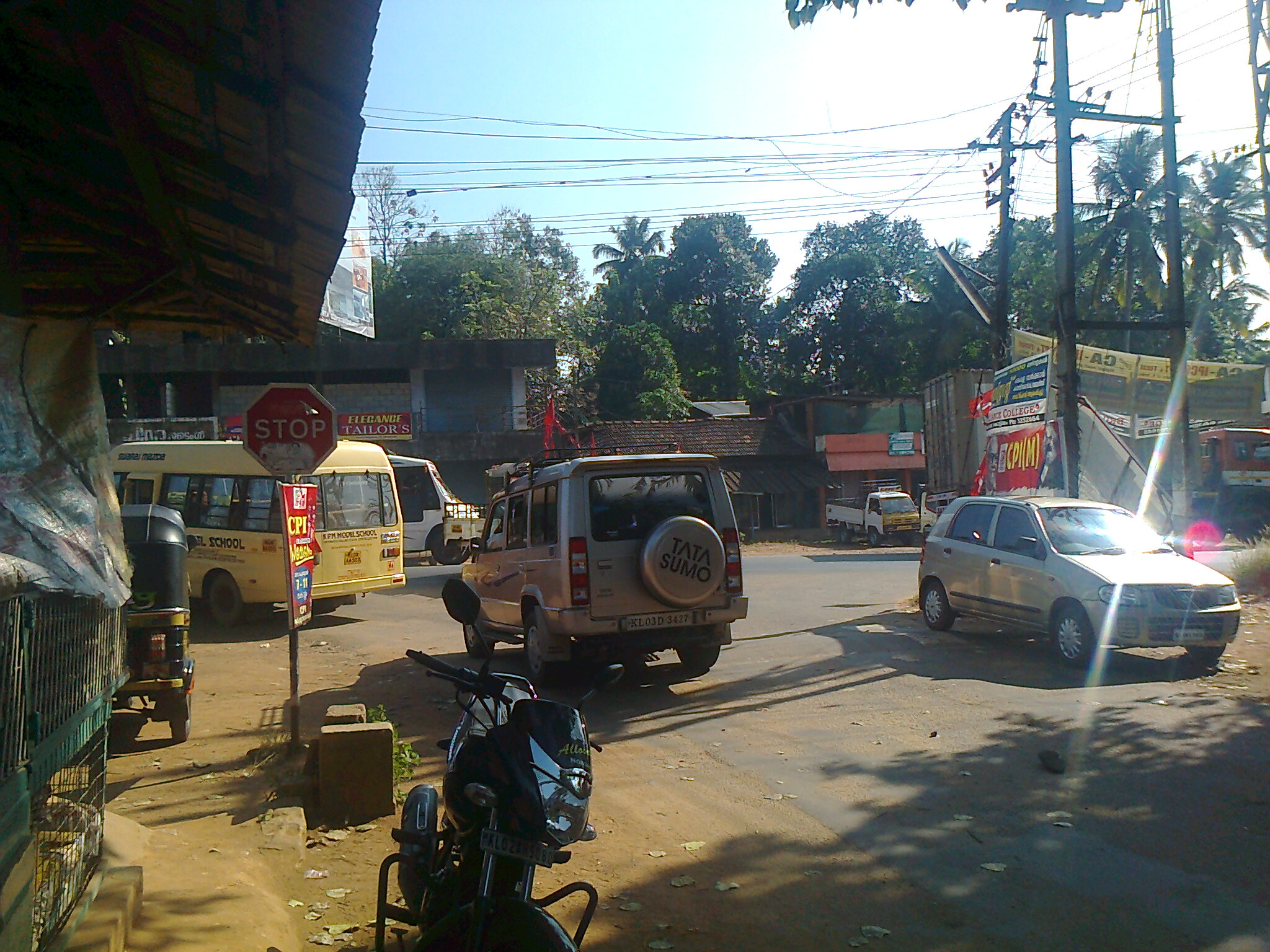
- Mylakkadu Junction
- Interactive map of Mylakkadu
- Coordinates: 8.8635°N 76.690°E
- Country: India
- State: Kerala
- District: Kollam

Government
  - Body: Adichanalloor

Languages
  - Official: Malayalam, English
- Time zone: UTC+5:30 (IST)
- PIN: 691571
- Telephone code: 0474
- Vehicle registration: KL-2
- Nearest city: Kollam
- Literacy: 95%
- Lok Sabha constituency: Kollam
- Vidhan Sabha constituency: Chathannoor
- Civic agency: Adichanalloor

Mylakkadu is a village located in Adichanalloor grama panchayat of Kollam district, Kerala, India. It is a junction near the town of Kottiyam and has road connectivity to Kollam, Paravur, Chathannoor, and Thiruvananthapuram.

== Administration ==
- District: Kollam
- Panchayat: Adichanalloor
- Lok Sabha constituency: Kollam
- Vidhan Sabha constituency: Chathannoor

== Education ==
=== Schools located in or near Mylakkadu ===
- _{G.L.P.S. Mylakkad – Government Lower Primary School}
- _{LRose Dale School, Mylakkadu}
- _{The King's School (IGCSE) – NH 47, Kottiyam}
- _{Auxilium English Medium School (ICSE) – Hospital Road, Kottiyam}
- _{CF High School, Kottiyam}

=== Colleges located in or near Mylakkadu ===
- Sree Narayana Polytechnic College, Kottiyam
- Mannam Memorial NSS College, Kottiyam
- NSS Law College, Kottiyam
- MES Institute of Technology & Management, Chathannoor
- SN College, Chathannoor
- R. Sankar College of Arts & Science

== Healthcare Facilities ==
- KIMSHEALTH Multispeciality Hospital,Sithara Junction– Major multispecialty hospital
- Holy Cross Hospital, Kottiyam – Major multispecialty hospital
- Travancore Medical College Hospital, Mevaram
- NS Memorial Institute of Medical Sciences, Palathara

== Malls nearby ==
- Dreams Mall, Kottiyam
- LuLu Hypermarket (groceries, bakery, fresh produce, electronics, and gadgets)
- K Mall, Kottiyam
- Q Mall, Kottiyam
- Safeer Mall, Kottiyam
