= Vilappuram Bhagavathy Temple =

- Bhagavathy Temple, Vilappuram, Chathannoor, Kollam, Kerala

Religion
- Affiliation: Hinduism
- District: Kollam
- Deity: Bhagavathy

Location
- Location: Vilappuram, Chathannoor
- State: Kerala
- Country: India
- Interactive map of Vilappuram Bhagavathy Temple
- Coordinates: 8°50′38.7″N 76°42′37.8″E

Architecture
- Type: Architecture of Kerala

Specifications
- Temple: One
- Elevation: 68.85 m (226 ft)

Vilappuram Bhagavathy Temple is a small temple, home of the famous Vilappuram Devi Temple (Anandavilasam Bhagavathi Temple) situated in Chathannoor, Kollam, Kerala, in the peninsular India. In the same compound, there is the famous Anandavilasam library, affiliated to Kerala State Library Council, having more than 1,200 members and around 13,000 books. In the library, there are facilities of computer, internet, telephone, etc. Children's wing, Ladies wing, Women's Home library scheme, Continuing education centre etc. are available here.
