= Killing of Vandana Das =

2023 murder of a medical doctor from Kerala

Murder of Vandana Das
- Date: 10 May 2023
- Location: Kottarakkara, Kerala, India
- Deaths: Vandana Das

On 10 May 2023, 22-year-old doctor Vandana Das was fatally stabbed while on hospital duty at the Kottarakkara Taluk Hospital in Kerala, India. The assailant was identified as a 42-year old school teacher from Pooyappally in Kollam. Vandana's killing sparked outrage among healthcare professionals in Kerala and they demanded stringent legal action against those committing violent acts against healthcare professionals. On March 21, 2026, the court sentenced G.Sandeep to life imprisonment along with a fine of ₹1 lakh, rejecting the prosecution's plea for death penalty.

== Killing ==
Vandana Das was a 22-year-old doctor who had studied at the Azeezia Institute of Medical Science in Kollam. She was working at the Kottarakkara Taluk Hospital as a part of her internship training. On 10 May 2023, a suspect was brought for medical examination by the police at around 4:30 am at the Kottarakkara Taluk hospital.

The suspect named was a 42-year-old upper primary school teacher, who was found in Pooyappally with injuries on one of his legs. He was intoxicated and called 112, claiming he felt threatened by someone and was causing a disturbance in his neighborhood. The police apprehended him and took him to the hospital for a medical examination. Two people, including a close relative, accompanied him to the hospital. At the hospital, the suspect attacked a police officer and another person in the dressing room of the hospital. The remaining witnesses fled, except for Das, who was unable to run. The suspect stabbed Das with a pair of scissors multiple times. She sustained multiple injuries on her chest and neck, and was immediately taken to a hospital in Thiruvananthapuram, where she died. Her autopsy confirmed that she was fatally stabbed by a "surgical scissor" more than three times on her neck and back. Bystanders said that the suspect continued stabbing Vandana even after she fell to the ground.

== Investigation and trial ==
In February 2025, witness examination began.

As of July 2025, the trial of the suspect is ongoing. The trial has faced multiple delays due to changes in legal representation.

== Responses ==
The House Surgeon's Association of Kerala, the organisation of intern doctors, staged a protest and raised slogans demanding justice for Vandana. The Kerala Government Medical Officers' Association and the Indian Medical Association called for a one-day Kerala-wide protest over the death of Vandana. The incident sparked outrage among doctors, accusing the government and hospitals of having poor work conditions for interns and lack of safety for doctors against violence.

== Legacy ==
Vandana's funeral was held in Pattalamukku, near Kaduthuruthy, on 11 May, 2023.

In October 2024, the Dr Vandana Das Memorial Clinic opened in Thrikkunnapuzha, Alappuzha district.

A hospital named in honour of Vandana is expected to open in Kottayam in August 2025.
