= Chathannoor Assembly constituency =

Constituency of the Kerala legislative assembly in India

Chathannoor
- Constituency No. 126 for the Kerala Legislative Assembly
- Chathannoor In Kollam District

Constituency details
- Country: India
- Region: South India
- State: Kerala
- District: Kollam
- Established: 1965
- Total electors: 1,46666 (2021)
- Reservation: None

Member of Legislative Assembly
- 16th Kerala Legislative Assembly
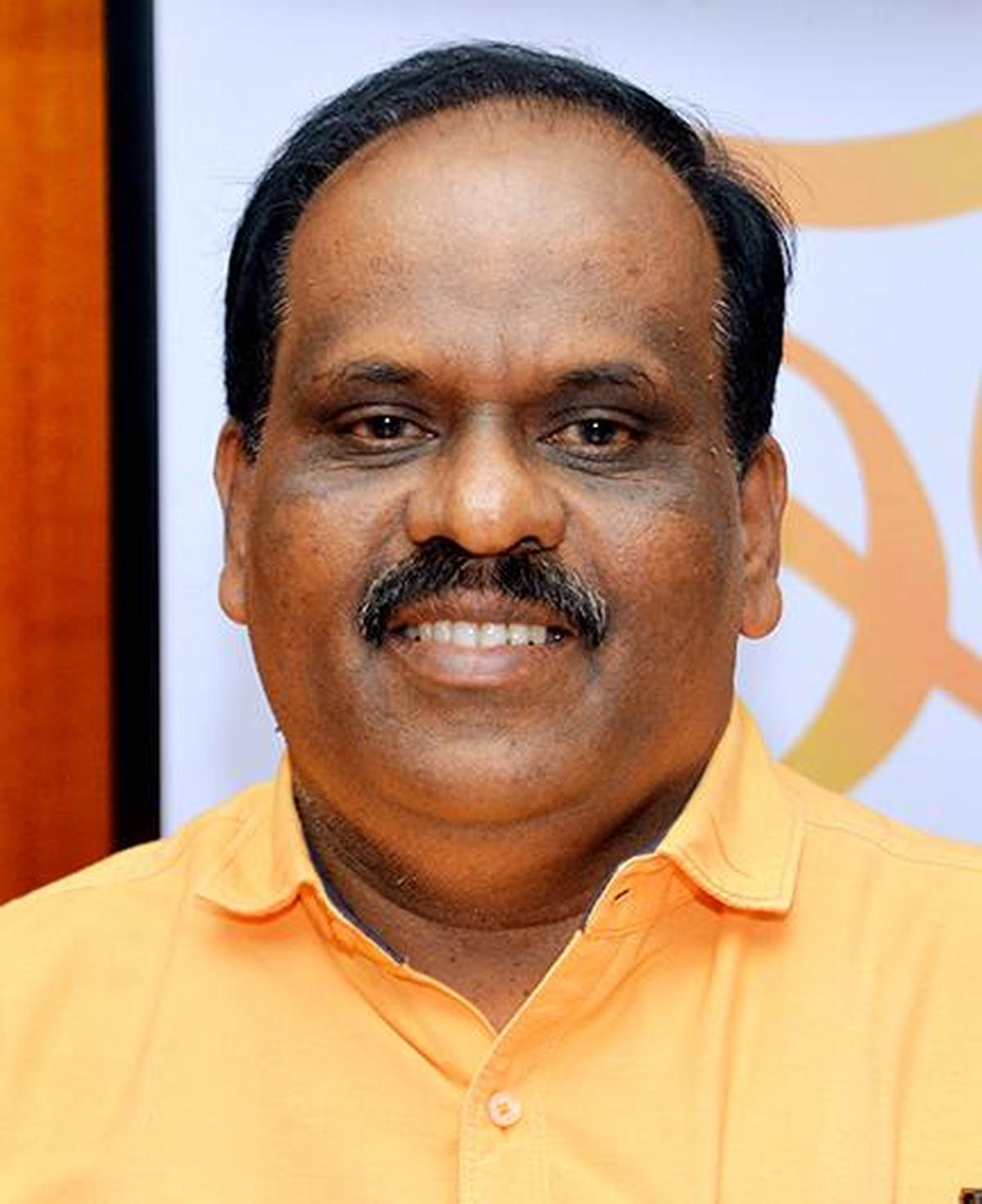
- Incumbent B. B. Gopakumar
- Party: BJP
- Alliance: NDA
- Elected year: 2026

Chathannoor or Chathannur is the 126th legislative assembly constituency in the southwest of Kollam district in Kerala, India. Chathannoor Assembly constituency is a part of Kollam Lok Sabha Constituency, Kollam Taluk, Kottarakkara Taluk, Ithikkara Block Panchayat and the Kollam Revenue Division. It is one among the eleven assembly constituencies in the district. As of the 2026 Kerala Legislative Assembly election, the current MLA is B. B. Gopakumar of BJP.

This constituency serves as a vital stronghold for the RSS, dominated by Ezhava population

== History ==
The constituency was previously known as Paravur Assembly constituency. It was temporarily merged with Varkala Assembly constituency in 1957. Because of the merger, Varkala Assembly constituency became a two-member constituency during the legislative assembly election of 1957 and interim election of 1960. Later in 1967, the new constituency was carved out of Varkala and was named as Chathannoor Assembly constituency. The MLA office was shifted from Paravur to Chathannoor. In 1967, P. Ravindran of CPI became the first elected member from Chathannoor Assembly constituency.

== Local self-governed segments ==
Chathannoor Assembly constituency is composed of the following local self-governed segments.

Sl no.	Name	Status	Taluk	Ruling alliance
1	Adichanalloor	Grama panchayat	Kollam	UDF
2	Chathannoor	Grama panchayat	Kollam	LDF
3	Chirakkara	Grama panchayat	Kollam	NDA
4	Kalluvathukkal	Grama panchayat	Kollam	LDF
5	Paravoor	Municipality	Kollam	LDF
6	Poothakkulam	Grama panchayat	Kollam	LDF
7	Pooyappally	Grama Panchayat	Kottarakkara	UDF

== Major institutions ==
- Municipalities: Paravur
- Panchayaths: Chirakkara, Chathannoor, Adichanalloor, Poothakkulam, Kalluvathukkal, Pooyappally
- Railway stations: Paravur railway station
- Bus stations: Chathannoor KSRTC Bus Station, Paravur Municipal Bus Station
- Public Sector Undertaking : Chathanoor
- Medical college hospital: Kollam Government Medical College, Parippally
- Government hospitals: Government MCH, Govt. Taluk Hospital, Paravur
- Private hospitals: Azeezia Medical College Meeyannoor, Kollam KIMS Sithara Jn, Holy Cross Hospital Kottiyam

== Members of Legislative Assembly ==
=== Paravur Assembly Constituency: Travancore-Cochin Legislative Assembly Elections ===
Year	Winner	Party	Vote Margin	Coalition
1951	P. Ravindran	Independent	7,790	Left
1954	P. Ravindran	CPI	3,878	Left

=== Kerala ===
The following list contains all members of Kerala Legislative Assembly who have represented the constituency:

Election	Member	Party	Margin
1965	Thankappan Pillai	Independent	768
1967	P. Ravindran	Communist Party of India	11,209
1970	P. Ravindran	Communist Party of India	13,948
1977	J. Chitharanjan	Communist Party of India	18,771
1980	J. Chitharanjan	Communist Party of India	5,367
1982	C. V. Padmarajan	Indian National Congress	5,802
1987	P. Ravindran	Communist Party of India	2,456
1991	C. V. Padmarajan	Indian National Congress	4,511
1996	P. Ravindran	Communist Party of India	2,115
1998*	N. Anirudhan	Communist Party of India	3,938
2001	G. Prathapa Varma Thampan	Indian National Congress	547
2006	N. Anirudhan	Communist Party of India	23,180
2011	G. S. Jayalal	Communist Party of India	12,589
2016	G. S. Jayalal	Communist Party of India	34,407
2021	G. S. Jayalal	Communist Party of India	17,206
2026	B B Gopakumar	Bharatiya Janata Party	4,398

* by-elections

== Election Results ==
=== 2026 ===
2026 Kerala Legislative Assembly election: Chathannoor
Party	Candidate	Votes	%	±%
BJP	B. B. Gopakumar	51,923	38.54	▲7.93
CPI	R. Rajendran	47,525	35.28	▼7.84
INC	Sooraj Ravi	35,276	26.18	▲1.25
NOTA	None of the above	728	0.53	
AAP	Arun Chathannoor	627	0.46	
Anna DHRM	Sindhu Puthenkulam	428	0.31	
Margin of victory		4,398	3.22	▼10.11
Turnout		1,36,507	75.89	▲1.43
BJP gain from CPI		Swing	7.86	

=== 2021 ===
There were 1,84,661 registered voters in the constituency for the 2021 Kerala Assembly election.

2021 Kerala Legislative Assembly election: Chathannur
Party	Candidate	Votes	%	±%
CPI	G. S. Jayalal	59,296	43.12	▼7.64
BJP	B. B. Gopakumar	42,090	30.61	▲5.69
INC	N. Peethambara Kurup	34,280	24.93	▲2.30
NOTA	None of the above	642	0.47	
BSP	Sunu Bhaskaran	364	0.26	▼0.11
Independent	Sethu	172	0.13	
Independent	Varinjam Rajeev	135	0.10	
Margin of victory		17,206	12.51	▼13.33
Turnout		1,37,503	74.46	▲0.43
CPI hold		Swing	6.67	

=== 2016 ===
There were 1,79,928 registered voters in the constituency for the 2016 Kerala Assembly election.

{{Election box with party link|winner=Communist Party of India|swing=▼1.90}}

2016 Kerala Legislative Assembly election: Chathannur
Party	Candidate	Votes	%	±%
CPI	G. S. Jayalal	67,606	50.76	▼1.9
BJP	B. B. Gopakumar	33,199	24.92	▲21.56
INC	Soorand Rajasekharan	30,139	22.63	▼19.01
Independent	Raju	658	0.49	
NOTA	None of the above	604	0.45	
BSP	Salimraj A.	491	0.37	▼0.06
SS	Velayudhan Pillai	290	0.22	▼0.03
API	Jayakala L.	212	0.16	
Margin of victory		34,407	25.84	▲14.82
Turnout		1,33,199	74.03	▲2.90

=== 2011 ===
There were 1,60,688 registered voters in the constituency for the 2011 election.

2011 Kerala Legislative Assembly election: Chathannur
Party	Candidate	Votes	%	±%
CPI	G. S. Jayalal	60,187	52.66	
INC	Bindu Krishna	47,598	41.64	
BJP	Kizhakkanela Sudhakaran	3,839	3.36	
Independent	A. Sasi	1,134	0.99	
Independent	Jayalal	763	0.67	
BSP	Maliode Sudhan	490	0.43	
SS	Sasikumar	287	0.25	
Margin of victory		12,589	11.02	
Turnout		1,14,298	71.13	
CPI hold		Swing		

=== 2006 ===
2006 Kerala Legislative Assembly election: Chathannur
Party	Candidate	Votes	%	±%
CPI	N. Anirudhan	59,379	56.80	
INC	G. Prathapa Varma Thampan	36,199	34.62	
BJP	Muraleedharan Pillai	4,940	4.72	
Margin of victory		23,180	22.18	
Turnout		1,04,531		
CPI gain from INC		Swing		

=== 2001 ===
There were 1,60,402 registered voters in the constituency for the 2001 Kerala Assembly election.

2001 Kerala Legislative Assembly election: Chathannur
Party	Candidate	Votes	%	±%
INC	G. Prathapa Varma Thampan	53,304	47.52	
CPI	N. Anirudhan	52,757	47.03	
BJP	B Sajanlal	6,110	5.45	
Margin of victory		547	0.49	
Turnout		1,12,171	69.96	
INC gain from CPI		Swing		

=== 1998 by-election ===
There were 1,58,953 registered voters in the constituency for the 1998 by-election.

1998 by-election: Chathannur
Party	Candidate	Votes	%	±%
CPI	N. Anirudhan	53,471	48.13	
INC	C. V. Padmarajan	49,533	44.59	
BJP	B. I. Sreenagesh	7,252	6.53	
Margin of victory		3,938	3.54	
Turnout		1,13,031	71.10	
CPI hold		Swing		

=== 1996 ===
There were 1,55,086 registered voters in the constituency for the 1996 Kerala Assembly election.

1996 Kerala Legislative Assembly election: Chathannur
Party	Candidate	Votes	%	±%
CPI	P. Ravindran	49,083	46.84	
INC	C. V. Padmarajan	46,968	44.83	
BJP	Rajendran	3,633	3.47	
Margin of victory		2,115	2.01	
Turnout		1,04,778	70.30	
CPI gain from INC		Swing		

=== 1991 ===
There were 1,47,686 registered voters in the constituency for the 1991 Kerala Assembly election.

1991 Kerala Legislative Assembly election: Chathannur
Party	Candidate	Votes	%	±%
INC	C. V. Padmarajan	53,755	50.56	
CPI	P. Ravindran	49,244	46.32	
BJP	Kizhakkanela Sudhakaran	2,892	2.72	
Margin of victory		4,511	4.22	
Turnout		1,06,323	73.14	
INC gain from CPI		Swing		

=== 1987 ===
There were 1,22,914 registered voters in the constituency for the 1987 Kerala Assembly election.

1987 Kerala Legislative Assembly election: Chathannur
Party	Candidate	Votes	%	±%
CPI	P. Ravindran	46,501	48.52	
INC	C. V. Padmarajan	44,045	45.96	
BJP	P Gopalakrishna Pillai	4,484	4.68	
Margin of victory		2,456	2.56	
Turnout		95,839	78.45	
CPI gain from INC		Swing		

=== 1982 ===
There were 95,013 registered voters in the constituency for the 1982 Kerala Assembly election.

1982 Kerala Legislative Assembly election: Chathannur
Party	Candidate	Votes	%	±%
INC	C. V. Padmarajan	37,811	53.51	
CPI	J. Chitharanjan	32,009	45.30	
Margin of victory		5,802	8.21	
Turnout		70,666	74.90	
INC gain from CPI		Swing		

=== 1980 ===
There were 95,044 registered voters in the constituency for the 1980 Kerala Assembly election.

1980 Kerala Legislative Assembly election: Chathannur
Party	Candidate	Votes	%	±%
CPI	J. Chitharanjan	34,037	50.15	
JP	Varinjam Vasu Pillai	28,670	42.24	
Margin of victory		5,367	7.91	
Turnout		67,870	71.70	
CPI hold		Swing		

=== 1977 ===
There were 86,137 registered voters in the constituency for the 1977 Kerala Assembly election.

1977 Kerala Legislative Assembly election: Chathannur
Party	Candidate	Votes	%	±%
CPI	J. Chitharanjan	38,787	62.81	
BLD	Varinjam Vasu Pillai	20,016	32.41	
Margin of victory		18,771	30.40	
Turnout		61,756	76.34	
CPI hold		Swing		
