= Ithikkara River =

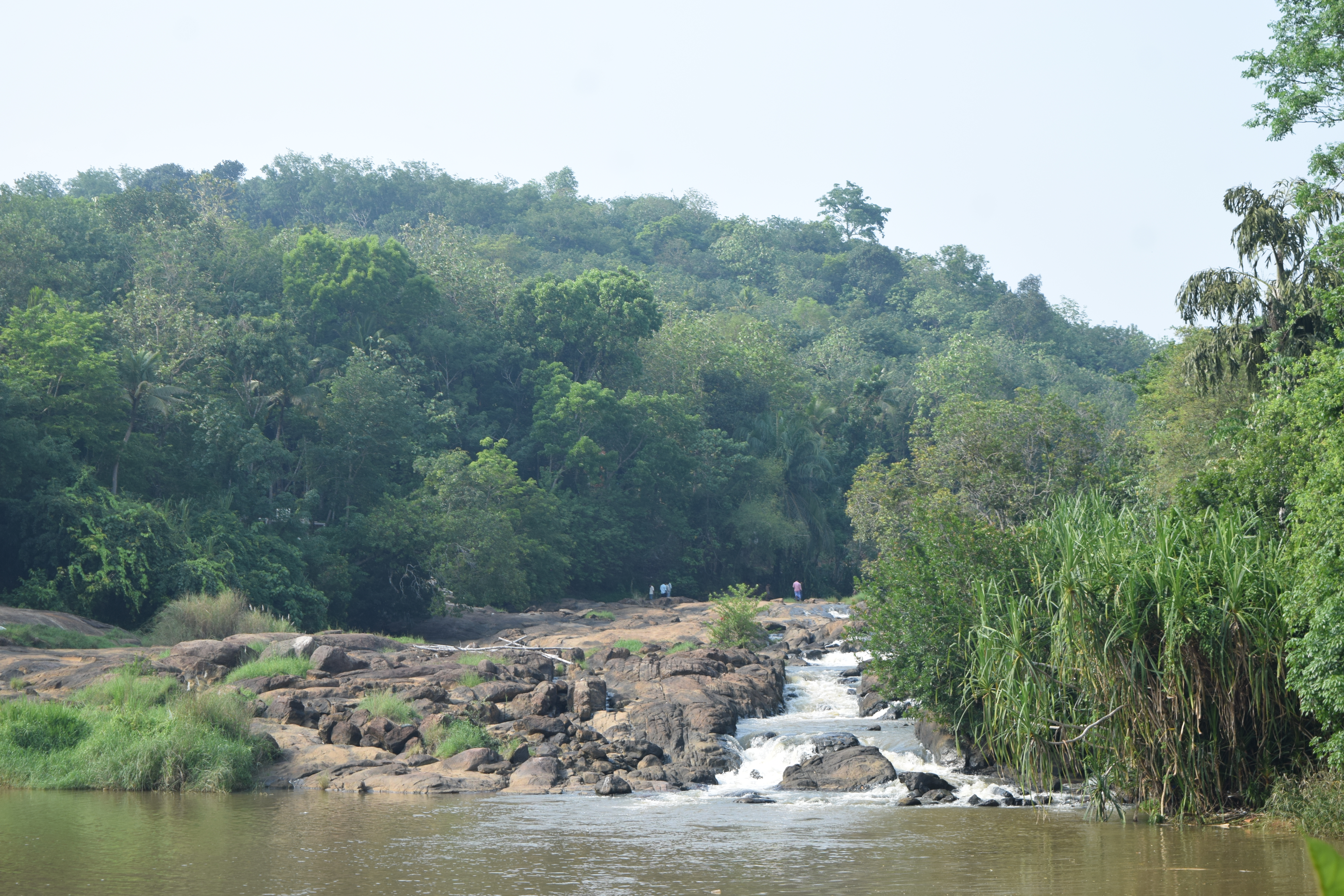
- Ithikkara River at Vattathil Waterfall Kalladathanni

Location
- Country: India
- State: Kollam district, Kerala

Physical characteristics
- Mouth: Empties into Paravur Lake
- Length: 35 mi (56 km)

Ithikkara River is a 56 km long river in Kerala, India. It originates in the Kulathupuzha in the Western Ghats and flows through the Kollam district, finally emptying into Paravur Lake. The village of Ithikkara is located on the river, 15 km from the port of Kollam. The river also flows through the settlements of Chathannoor and Pooyappally.
