= G. S. Jayalal =

Indian politician

G.S. Jayalal
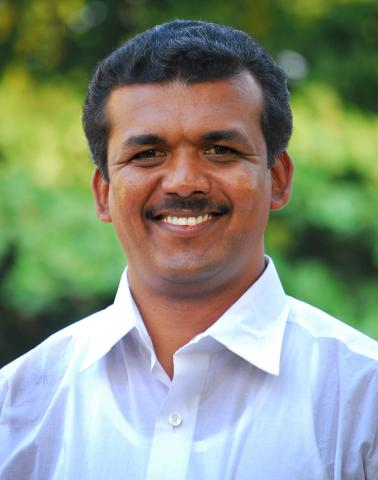
- G.S. Jayalal

Member of Kerala Legislative Assembly
- In office 2011–2026
- Preceded by: N. Anirudhan
- Succeeded by: B. B. Gopakumar
- Constituency: Chathannoor

Personal details
- Born: 20 May 1972 (age 54) Chirakkara, Kollam
- Party: Communist Party of India
- Spouse: R.S. Preetha
- Children: one son and one daughter

G.S Jayalal is an Indian politician and social worker who represented Chathannoor assembly constituency. He is a member of the Communist Party of India and has served as member of part State Council.

== Early life and education ==
He was born as the son of S. Gopala Krishna Pillai and Sathibai on 20 May 1972 at Chirakkara of Kollam district. After attending Chirakkara Government High School, G.S. Jayalal earned his SSLC in 1987. Gopalakrishna Pillai, his father, served as vice president of the Kalluvathukkal panchayat and is one of the Communist Party's Chathannoor constituency leaders.

== Personal life ==
His wife R.S. Preetha is an LIC Insurance agent. The couple has two children Ardra P Lal, Advait Krishna.

== Positions held ==
- Elected to Kerala Legislative Assembly in 2011 & 2016 from Chathannoor (Assembly constituency)
- Communist Party of India, Kerala state council member
- Communist Party of India, Kollam district council member
- State President, All Kerala Water Authority Employees Union (A.I.T.U.C.)
- Secretary of the AYF Chathannoor
- Vice-President, Kollam Co-operative Spinning Mill Employees Union

== Assembly election candidature history ==
Year	Constituency	Opponent	Result	Margin
2011	Chathannoor	Bindu Krishna (INC)	Won	12,589
2016	Chathannoor	B. B. Gopakumar (BJP)	Won	34,407
2021	Chathannoor	B. B. Gopakumar (BJP)	Won	17,206

== Controversies ==
In 2019, G.S Jayalal faced allegations related to hospital purchase without the party's consent.

The Swanthanam Cooperative Hospital Society with Jayalal as president had signed an agreement to purchase Ashtamudi Hospital at Kollam . An agreement has also been signed to pay advance without seeking permission of the party.

Criticisms against the move by Mr. Jayalal intensified pointing out that the deal has been made even as the C. Achutha Menon Cooperative Hospital run by the party's district committee remains shut for the past several months due to lack of funds. Communist Party of India found lapse in Jayalal's action and recommended disciplinary actions for performing a deal without the knowledge of party.
