= P. Ravindran =

Indian politician

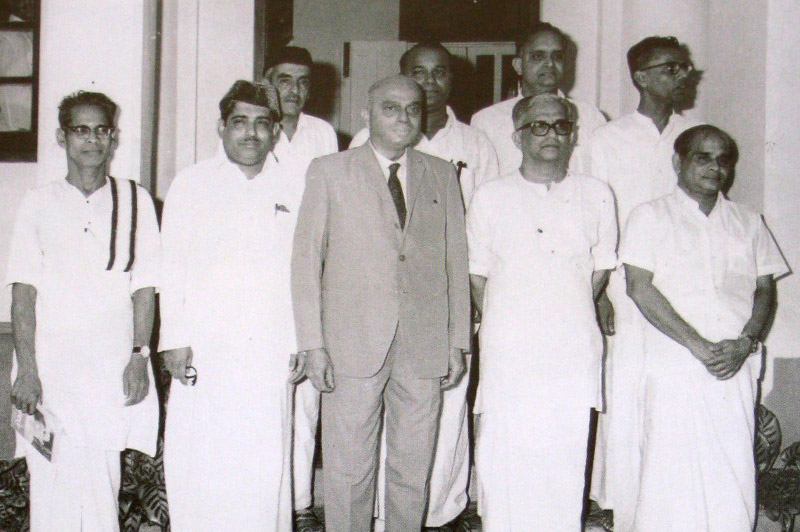
- P. Ravindran (top right corner) with other ministers in the Achutha Menon ministry

Member of the Legislative Assembly
- In office 20 May 1996 – 13 November 1997
- Preceded by: C. V. Padmarajan
- Succeeded by: N. Anirudhan
- Constituency: Chathannoor
- In office 26 March 1987 – 17 June 1991
- Preceded by: C. V. Padmarajan
- Succeeded by: C. V. Padmarajan
- Constituency: Chathannoor

Member of the Legislative Assembly
- In office 4 October 1970 – 25 March 1977
- Preceded by: Self
- Succeeded by: J. Chitharanjan
- Constituency: Chathannoor

Minister for Industries, Labour & Forests
- In office 1 November 1969 – 3 August 1970
- Preceded by: Mathai Manjooran
- Succeeded by: Baby John
- Constituency: Chathannoor

Member of the Legislative Assembly
- In office 6 March 1967 – 1 November 1969
- Preceded by: NA
- Succeeded by: Self
- Constituency: Chathannoor

Member of the Legislative Assembly
- In office 22 February 1960 – 26 September 1962
- Preceded by: NA
- Succeeded by: Self
- Constituency: Eravipuram
- In office 5 April 1957 – 31 July 1959
- Preceded by: Self
- Succeeded by: R. S. Unni

Member of the Legislative Assembly
- In office 1954–1957
- Preceded by: NA
- Succeeded by: Self
- Constituency: Paravur (now Chathannoor)
- In office 1951–1954
- Preceded by: Self
- Succeeded by: NA
- Constituency: Paravur (now Chathannoor)

Personal details
- Born: Padmanabhan Ravindran; 14 November 1922 Nedungolam near Paravur, Travancore, British India (now in Kerala, India)
- Died: 13 November 1997 (aged 74)
- Party: Communist Party of India
- Spouse: K. Savithrikutty
- Children: 1 daughter
- Parent: Padmanabhan (Father)
- Education: Graduation in Law

Padmanabhan Ravindran (14 November 1922 – 13 November 1997) or P. Ravindran was an Indian politician who was the Minister for Industries, Labour and Forests in Kerala from 1 November 1969 to 3 August 1970. He was the secretary of the CPI Legislature Party from 1967 to 69. Ravindran was imprisoned many times for political reasons. He also chaired as the Chairman and Managing Director of Janayugom Newspaper, Prabhatham Printers and Publishing Company. He has played a major role in building the party cadre in the state of Kerala and received the Sadanandan Award for the Best Co-operator.

Ravindran became the MLA of Paravur constituency (now known as Chathannoor assembly constituency) during the Travancore-Cochin assembly elections held in 1951 and 1954. After the dissolution of Paravur constituency, he contested from Eravipuram during the general assembly election of 1957 and the interim election held in 1960. Ravindran represented Chathannoor constituency in Kerala assembly in 1967, 1970, 1987 and 1996.

On 13 November 1997, a day before his 75th birthday, Ravindran died when he was in the position of Chathannoor MLA

== Electoral history ==
Year	Constituency	Opponent	Result	Margin
1951	Paravur	Kunjukrishnan (INC)	Won	7,790
1954	Paravur	Gopala Pillai (INC)	Won	3,878
1957	Eravipuram	V. Kunju Sankara Pillai (PSP)	Won	10,360
1960(Interim)	Eravipuram	Bhaskara Pillai (PSP)	Won	1,859
1967	Chathannoor	S. Thankappan Pillai (KEC)	Won	11,209
1970	Chathannoor	S. Thankappan Pillai (KEC)	Won	13,948
1987	Chathannoor	C. V. Padmarajan (INC)	Won	2,456
1991	Chathannoor	C. V. Padmarajan (INC)	Lost	4,511
1996	Chathannoor	C. V. Padmarajan (INC)	Won	2,115
