= Chathannoor Sree Bhoothanatha Temple =

Hindu temple in Kerala, India

Chathannoor Sree Bhoothanatha Temple &Meenadu Sastha temple
- Bhoothanatha Temple, Meenadu Sastha templeChathannoor, Kollam, Kerala

Religion
- Affiliation: Hinduism
- District: Kollam
- Deity: Bhoothanathar
- Festival: Temple Utsavam

Location
- Location: Chathannoor
- State: Kerala
- Country: India
- Interactive map of Chathannoor Sree Bhoothanatha Temple &Meenadu Sastha temple
- Coordinates: 8°51′32.4″N 76°42′51.8″Eand Meenadu Sastha temple&params=8_51_32.4_N_76_42_51.8_E_type:landmark

Specifications
- Temple: One
- Elevation: 45.36 m (149 ft)

Sree Bhoothanatha Temple & Meenadu Sastha temple is one of the well-known temples in Chathannoor neighbourhood of Kollam in Kerala in the peninsular India. One of the largest of its type in Kollam, the Nedum Kuthira of Chathannoor Sree Bhoothanatha Temple and Meenadu Sastha temple is held during the festival. These temples' festivals draw visitors from other cities. The Sree Bhoothanatha Temple Utsavam hosts one of the largest temple festivals in the Kollam district.
