= Kanjiramvila Bhagavathi Temple =

- Kanjiramvila Bhagavathy Temple, Chathannoor, Kollam, Kerala

Religion
- Affiliation: Hinduism
- District: Kollam
- Deity: Bhagavathy

Location
- Location: Chathannoor
- State: Kerala
- Country: India
- Interactive map of Kanjiramvila Bhagavathi Temple
- Coordinates: 8°51′52.5″N 76°42′47.8″E

Architecture
- Type: Architecture of Kerala

Specifications
- Temple: One
- Elevation: 52.15 m (171 ft)

Kanjiramvila Bhagavathi Temple is a Hindu pilgrim place and also a tourist centre situated in Chathannoor, Kollam, in the Kerala State of India. Many foreigners visit this temple on the occasion of Gajamela.
