= UKF College of Engineering and Technology =

- Motto: Learning to succeed
- Type: Education and research institution
- Established: 2009; 17 years ago
- Principal: Gopalakrishna Sharma
- Location: Kollam, Kerala, India; 8.8004°N 76.7397°E
- Website: www.ukfcet.ac.in

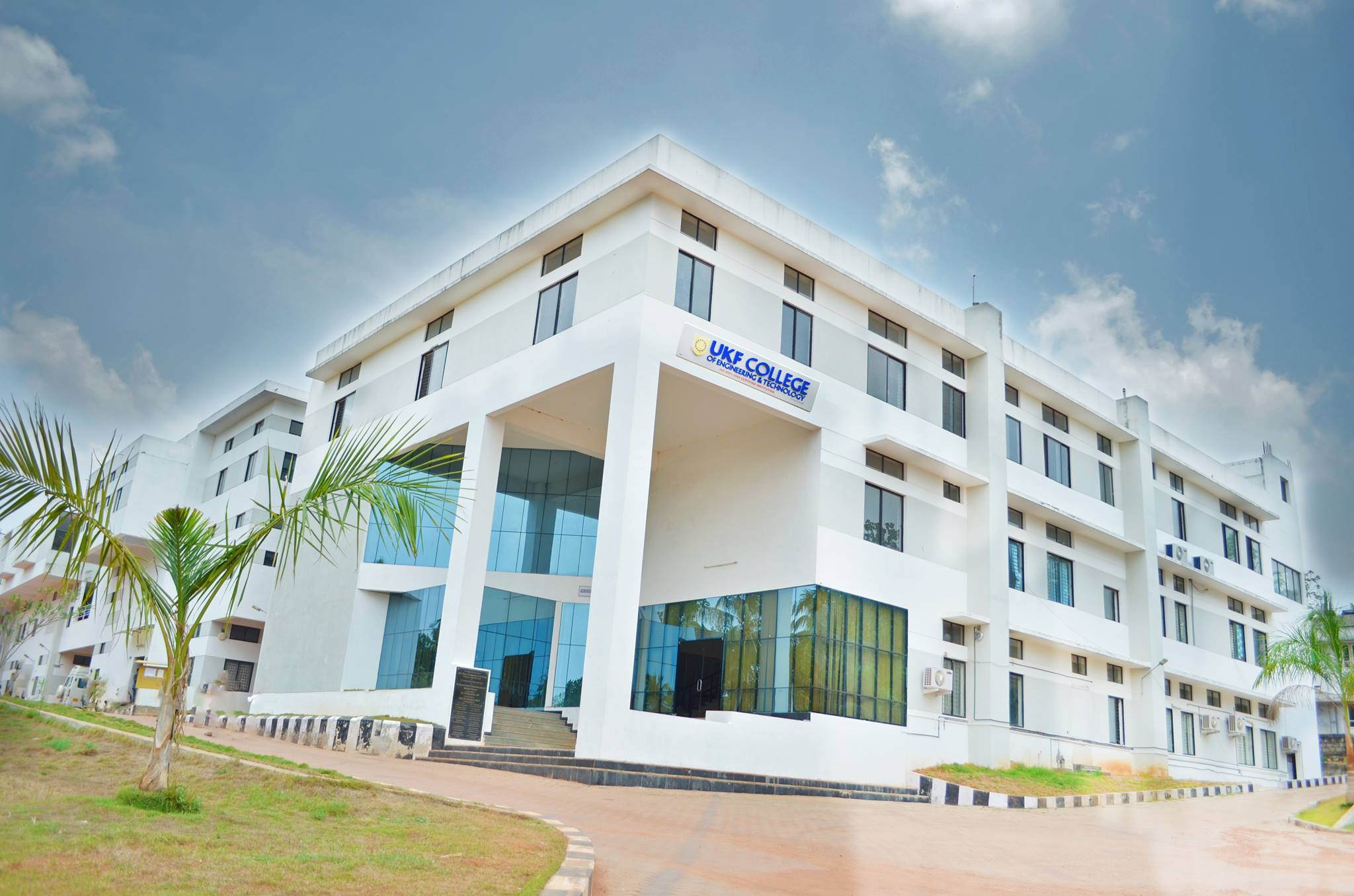
Main building

The UKF College of Engineering and Technology is an engineering college situated in Kalluvathukal Panchayath of Kollam district in Kerala, India. It is situated 9 km away from Varkala town, 24 km away from Kollam City and 48 km away from state capital city Thiruvananthapuram. Established in 2009, it is affiliated to the Kerala Technological University headquartered in Thiruvananthapuram city. UKF College of Engineering & Technology is owned and managed by the Universal Knowledge Foundation Trust.

== Academics ==
The UKF College of Engineering & Technology has been accorded approval by the All India Council for Technical Education (AICTE) for conducting 4-year (8-semester) B Tech degree course in various branches. The college is affiliated to the Kerala Technological University and the courses offered are as per the new scheme and syllabus of the university.

== Nearest Cities/Towns ==
- Varkala – 9 km
- Paravur – 10 km
- Attingal – 18 km
- Kollam – 24 km
- Kottarakkara – 28 km
- Punalur – 42 km
- Thiruvananthapuram – 46 km
- Karunagappally – 47 km
- Adoor – 47 km
- Nedumangad – 48 km

== Location ==
The college is located in Kollam district at Meenambalam, a village near Parippally on the National Highway 66.
