= Kalluvathukkal hooch tragedy =

The Kalluvathukkal alcohol disaster in Kollam district, Kerala was an incident that occurred on October 21, 2000, in which 33 people in Kalluvathukkal and 13 people in Pallikal and Pattazhi lost their lives after consuming illicit liquor.

When the spirit brought from Bengaluru to Manichan's godown in Chirayinkeezhu was mixed with an excessive amount of deadly methyl alcohol and sold through the house of Hairunnisa, also known as Kalluvathukkal Thatha, 33 people collapsed and died in Kalluvathukkal, Pallikkal, Pattazhi, and Pallipuram. However, official records state that the death toll was 31. Although the tragedy occurred on October 21, 2000, many who had consumed alcohol experienced discomfort on the night of the 20th. Many people suffered serious health problems, including loss of vision.

Thirteen accused, including Hairunnisa, Manichan, and their brothers Manikandan (Kochani) and Vinod Kumar, were sentenced to life imprisonment. Manichan was sentenced to 43 years in prison in addition to the life sentence. Thatha died while serving his sentence.
