= C. V. Padmarajan =

Indian politician (1931–2025)

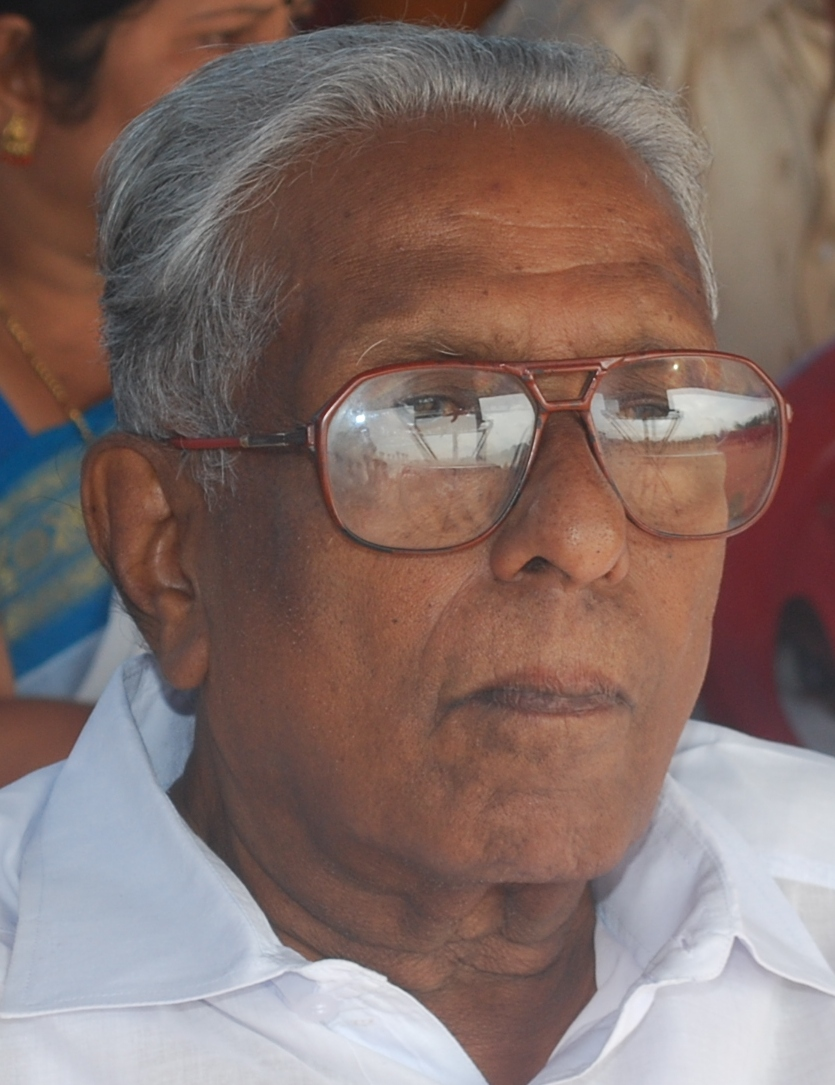

Minister for Finance
- In office 22 March 1995 – 9 May 1996
- Preceded by: Self
- Succeeded by: T. Sivadasa Menon
- Constituency: Chathannoor
- In office 22 June 1994- 16 March 1995
- Preceded by: Ommen Chandy
- Succeeded by: Himself

Minister for Electricity and Coir
- In office 2 July 1991 – 16 March 1995
- Preceded by: V. Viswanatha Menon
- Succeeded by: Himself (Coir) G. Karthikeyan (Electricity)
- Constituency: Chathannoor

Minister for Community Development and Fisheries
- In office 24 May 1982 – 25 March 1983
- Preceded by: A. C. Shanmughadas (Community Development) P. S. Sreenivasan (Fisheries)
- Succeeded by: P. K. Velayudhan
- Constituency: Chathannoor

Minister for Devasowam
- In office 22 March 1995 – 09 May 1996

Personal details
- Born: 22 July 1931 Paravur, Kingdom of Travancore, India (present day Kollam district, Kerala, India)
- Died: 16 July 2025 (aged 93) Kollam, Kerala, India
- Party: Indian National Congress
- Spouse: R. Vasanthakumari
- Children: 2
- Parents: K. Velu Vaidyar; K. M. Thankamma
- Education: Graduation in Law
- Occupation: Politician

C. Velu Vaidyar Padmarajan (22 July 1931 – 16 July 2025) was an Indian politician and advocate from Paravur, Kollam, Kerala. He was a minister in the Kerala Government, holding various portfolios including Finance, Electricity, Community Development, and Fisheries. He was also the Kerala Pradesh Congress Committee President in 1983–1987 period.

== Background ==
Padmarajan was born at Paravur in the erstwhile Kingdom of Travancore on 22 July 1931 as the son of K. Velu Vaidyar and K. M. Thankamma. He started his political life through All Travancore Student's Congress during the freedom struggle. He started his professional career as a teacher and later he took graduation on Law. He was appointed District Government Pleader and Public Prosecutor in Quilon during 1973–79. He married R. Vasantha Kumari and had two sons.

Padmarajan died on 16 July 2025, at the age of 93.

== Assembly election candidature history ==
Year	Constituency	Opponent	Result	Margin
1980	Quilon	Kadavoor Sivadasan (RSP)	Lost	2,414
1982	Chathannoor	J. Chitharanjan (CPI)	Won	5,802
1987	Chathannoor	P. Ravindran (CPI)	Lost	2,456
1991	Chathannoor	P. Ravindran (CPI)	Won	4,511
1996	Chathannoor	P. Ravindran (CPI)	Lost	2,115
1998 (by-election)	Chathannoor	N. Anirudhan (CPI)	Lost	3,938
