= Kodimoottil Sri Bhadrakaali Temple =

Hindu temple in India

Kodimoottil Sri Bhadrakali Temple
- Kodimoottil Sri Bhadrakali Temple, Parippally, Kollam, Kerala

Religion
- Affiliation: Hinduism
- District: Kollam
- Deity: Bhadrakali
- Festivals: Mahotsavam (Pongala and Gajamela)

Location
- Location: Parippally
- State: Kerala
- Country: India
- Interactive map of Kodimoottil Sri Bhadrakali Temple
- Coordinates: 8°48′52.6″N 76°45′38.6″E

Architecture
- Type: Architecture of Kerala

Specifications
- Temple: One
- Elevation: 78.51 m (258 ft)

Kodimoottil Sri Bhadrakaali Temple is the most famous temple in Parippally, Kollam in Kerala, India. The "Prathista" (idol) in this temple is Bhadrakali devi. Shiva, Ganapathi, Navagrahangal are also there as Upaprathista.

== Location ==
This temple is located with the geographic coordinates of 8°48′52.6″N 76°45′38.6″E at an altitude of about 78.51 m above the mean sea level.

== Festivals ==
There are a number of utsavams in this temple. The mahotsavam is held every year during the month of March for ten days, starting with the pongala. Ladies from all parts of Kollam and Trivandrum districts participate in it. Gajamela, an elephant procession, is the main attraction of the Mahotsavam, which occurs on the tenth day.

The temple is managed by Ezhava (Chekaver) community, but people from all castes participate in the festival. Navarathri is also celebrated here as a festival.

== See also ==
- Temples of Kerala
