= Parippally =

Parippally Parippalli
- Village
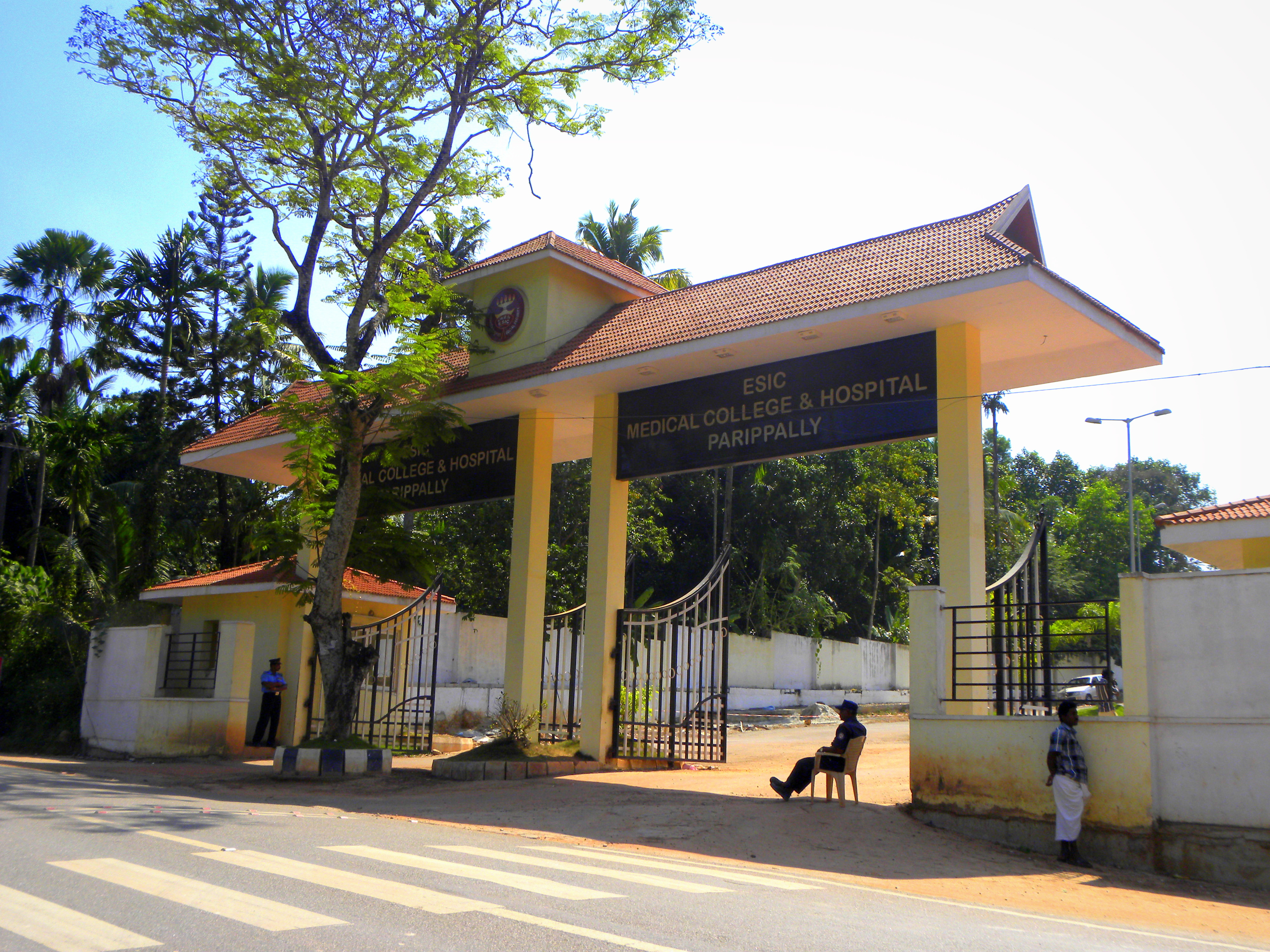
- Govt Medical College, Kollam
- Interactive map of Parippally
- Coordinates: 8.812361°N 76.758775°E
- Country: India
- State: Kerala
- District: Kollam

Government
  - Body: Kalluvathukkal Panchayath

Languages
  - Official: Malayalam, English
- Time zone: UTC+5:30 (IST)
- Postal code: 691 574
- Vehicle registration: KL-02
- Nearest city: Kollam (22 Km)
- Assembly constituency: Chathannoor
- Lok Sabha constituency: Kollam

Parippally is a town in Kalluvathukkal panchayat of Kollam district, Kerala, India. It is located along the National Highway 66 approximately 22 km (14 mi) southeast of the district headquarters Kollam and 47 km (29 mi) northwest of the capital city Thiruvananthapuram. Kollam Government Medical College is situated in Parippally.

== Transportation ==
Kollam Railway Station is 21 km from Paripally, while Paravur Railway Station, which is 10 km away, and Varkala Railway Station, located 11 km away, are also nearby.

Parippally, a significant town located on NH 66 along the route from Kollam to Thiruvananthapuram, boasts excellent connectivity to various major locations throughout Kerala. The closest airport, Thiruvananthapuram International Airport, is situated 45 kilometers (28 miles) away. For those traveling by helicopter, the Kollam Helipad (Asramam) is approximately 23 kilometers (14 miles) from Parippally, while the Varkala Helipad (Cliff) is about 13 kilometers (8.1 miles) away.

Four major roads connect Paravur, Kollam, Varkala, Pallickal and Thiruvananthapuram. Parippally is conveniently located: it is 13 kilometers from Varkala Beach and Varkala Temple, and 16 kilometers from Jatayu Earth's Center Nature Park.

== Administration ==
Parippally is the part of Kalluvathukkal Panchayath.

== Institutions ==
1) UKF Engineering College is in Parippally.

2) Govt Medical College, Kollam is situated in Paripally.

3) VKCET College of Engineering, Chavarcode, Parippally

4) Amrita Higher Secondary School, Parippally

== Temples ==
One of the most famous temples in Parippally is Kodimoottil Sri Bhadrakaali Temple. Gajamela and Pongala which are associated with the temple festival are very famous. Thousands of devotees come to watch the Gajamela.
