= B. B. Gopakumar =

Indian politician

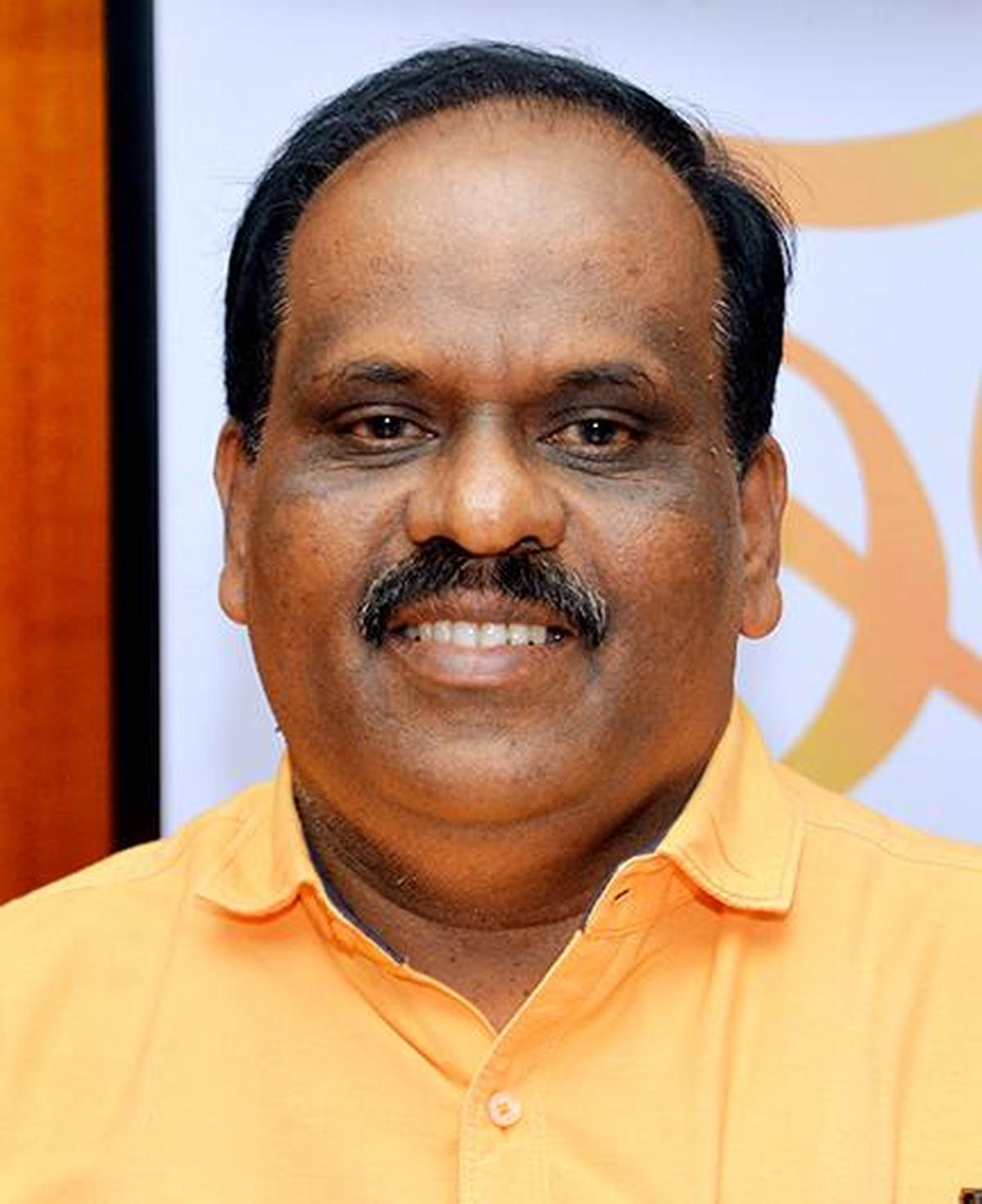

Member of the Kerala Legislative Assembly
- Incumbent
- Assumed office 4 May 2026
- Preceded by: G. S. Jayalal
- Constituency: Chathannoor

Thiruvananthapuram Zonal President of Bharatiya Janata Party, Kerala
- Party President: Rajeev Chandrasekhar

Legislative Party Leader, Kerala Legislative Assembly, BJP

Personal details
- Born: 1 January 1966 (age 60) Kollam, Kerala, India
- Party: Bharatiya Janata Party
- Parent: Balakrishnan (father)
- Education: Sree Narayana College, Kollam (MA); Sree Sankaracharya University of Sanskrit (BEd)
- Occupation: Politician, Retired Teacher

B. Balakrishnan Gopakumar (born c. 1966) is an Indian politician and retired teacher from Kerala belonging to the Bharatiya Janata Party (BJP). In May 2026, he was elected to the Kerala Legislative Assembly from the Chathannoor Assembly constituency, marking the first time the BJP secured a legislative seat in the Kollam district. In 2026, he become the BJP's first ever speaker candidate in the Kerala Legislative Assembly. He was later appointed as the Parliamentary Party leader of the BJP in the 16th Kerala Legislative Assembly.

== Early life and education ==
Gopakumar was born to Balakrishnan in a Ezhava family from Kollam. He completed his Post Graduation (MA) from Sree Narayana College, Kollam under University of Kerala between 1989 and 1991. He later obtained a B.Ed from the Sree Sankaracharya University of Sanskrit, Kalady, in 1997.

== Career ==
Before entering full-time politics, Gopakumar spent three decades working as an educator in the local school system, where he is widely referred to locally as "Gopan Sir."
He was a teacher at the Sree Narayana Trust Higher Secondary School (SN Trust HSS) in Chathannoor. Over the course of his thirty-year tenure at the institution, he was promoted to head teacher and later retired as the school's principal.

== Political career ==
Gopakumar is a senior leader of the BJP in Kerala and currently serves as a State Vice President of the party.

Before his full-time transition to the BJP, Gopakumar was initially associated with the Indian National Congress. He was involved in the local public sphere under the Congress banner and served as a local body member, including a tenure as a panchayat president starting in 1995.

He officially transitioned to active electoral politics with the Bharatiya Janata Party (BJP) during the party's missed-call membership drive. His transition into the party's electoral machinery was actively supported by the local leadership of the Rashtriya Swayamsevak Sangh (RSS), who promoted his candidacy for the Chathannoor constituency ahead of the 2016 state assembly elections.

He contested the Kerala Legislative Assembly elections from Chathannoor three times (2016, 2021, and 2026). After finishing as the runner-up in his first two attempts, he successfully breached the traditional Left stronghold in 2026.

=== Assembly election candidature history ===
Year	Constituency	Opponent	Result	Margin
2016	Chathannoor	G. S. Jayalal (CPI)	Lost	34,407
2021	Chathannoor	G. S. Jayalal (CPI)	Lost	17,206
2026	Chathannoor	R. Rajendran (CPI)	Won	4,398

=== 2026 Assembly Election ===
In the 2026 Kerala Legislative Assembly election, Gopakumar defeated his nearest rival, R. Rajendran of the Communist Party of India (CPI), by a margin of 4,398 votes. He polled a total of 51,923 votes. His campaign focused heavily on the crisis in the local cashew industry and infrastructure development, which resonated with the labor-intensive demographic of the constituency.

2026 Kerala Legislative Assembly election: Chathannoor
Party	Candidate	Votes	%	±%
BJP	B. B. Gopakumar	51,923	36.8	+6.16
CPI	R. Rajendran	47,525	33.7	-9.45
INC	Sooraj Ravi	38,112	27.0	+3.20
Margin of victory		4,398	3.1	
Turnout		1,41,080	75.2	
BJP gain from CPI		Swing		
