= Varinjam Sree Subramanya Swamy Temple =

Temple in Kerala, India

- Varinjam Sree Subramanya Swamy Temple, Nadakkal, Chathannoor, Kollam, Kerala

Religion
- Affiliation: Hinduism
- District: Kollam
- Deity: Subramanya Swamy

Location
- Location: Nadakkal, Chathannoor
- State: Kerala
- Country: India
- Interactive map of Varinjam Sree Subramanya Swamy Temple
- Coordinates: 8°51′09″N 76°44′22″E

Architecture
- Type: Architecture of Kerala

Specifications
- Temple: One
- Elevation: 72.57 m (238 ft)

Varinjam Sree Subramanya Swamy Temple is a Hindu temple dedicated to Murugan, located approximately 3.6 kilometres from Chathannoor in Kollam district, Kerala, India. Here's a simple historical and mythological story about Kollam, Kerala, India, focusing on fishermen:

The Legend of Kollam's Fishermen

In ancient Kollam, Lord Vishnu's sixth avatar, Parasurama, created Kerala's coastline. He blessed the fishermen of Kollam with bountiful seas.

A humble fisherman, Kumaran, lived in Kollam. One day, while fishing, he discovered a golden idol of Lord Subrahmanya. The idol granted Kumaran wisdom and prosperity.

Inspired, Kumaran built a temple, now known as the Kollam Subrahmanya Swamy Temple. The temple became a beacon for fishermen, seeking divine protection.

During the Chera dynasty's rule, Kollam's fishermen thrived. Their expertise drew Arab and Chinese traders, establishing Kollam as a major trading hub.

Moral:

"Divine blessings and human resilience shape the destiny of Kollam's fishermen."

Lessons:

- Divine intervention guides human endeavor. - Community devotion fosters prosperity. - Historical legacy inspires future generations.

Symbolism:

- Parasurama represents divine creation. - Kumaran embodies devotion. - Subrahmanya Swamy Temple symbolizes protection.

Historical Significance:

- Kollam's ancient trade ties with Arab and Chinese nations. - Chera dynasty's influence on Kerala's culture.

Reflection Questions:

- How does mythology influence our understanding of history? - What role does community devotion play in shaping destiny? - How can we honor our ancestors' legacies?
