= Chirakkara =

Chirakkara Chirakkara Kollam
- village
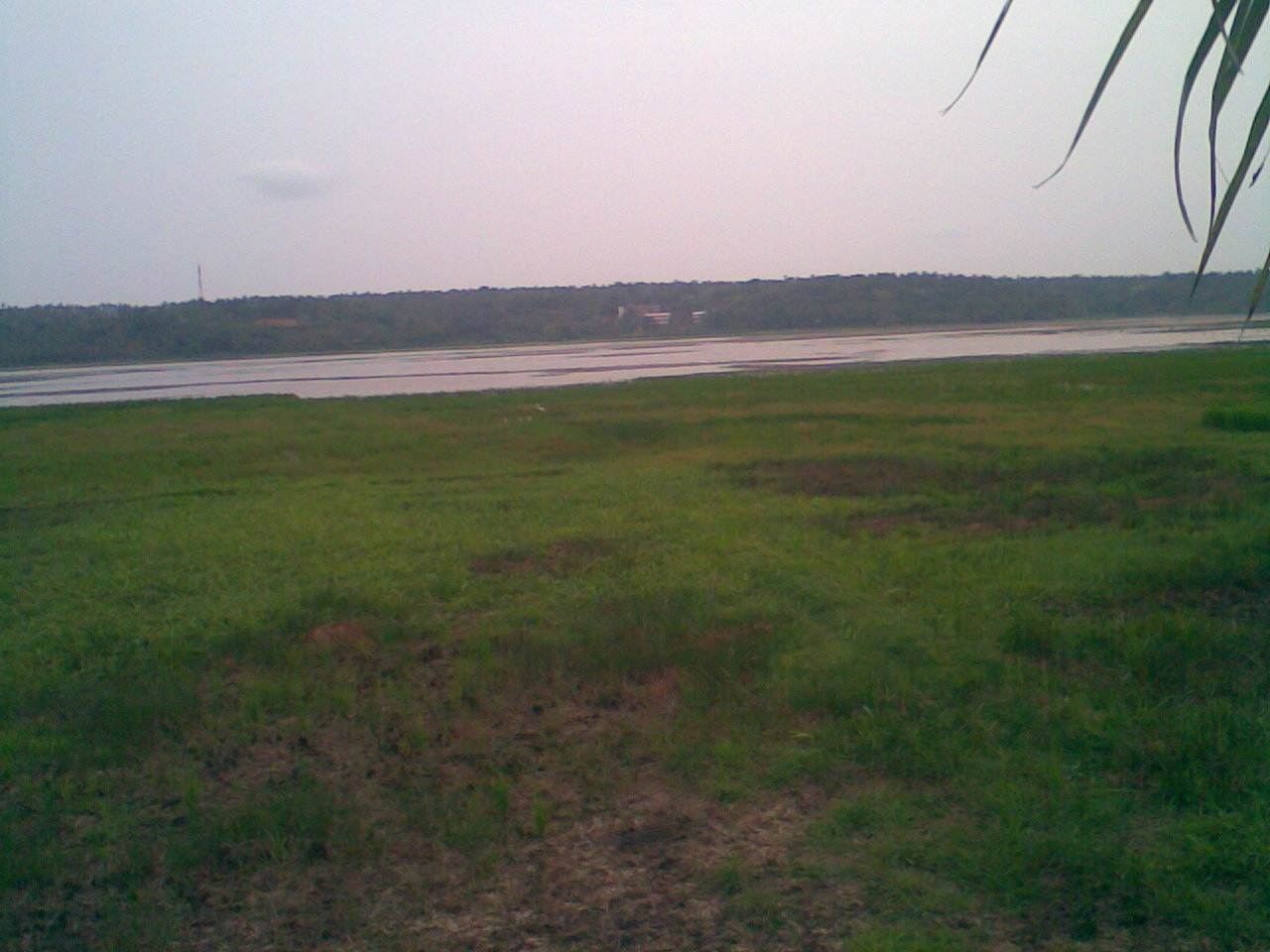
- Chirakkara village scene
- Nickname: Anathavalam
- Interactive map of Chirakkara
- Coordinates: 8.845619°N 76.716360°E
- Country: India
- State: Kerala
- District: Kollam

Population (2011)
  - Total: 17,342

Languages
  - Official: Malayalam, English
- Time zone: UTC+5:30 (IST)
- PIN: 691578
- Vehicle registration: KL-2
- Nearest town: Paravur
- Lok Sabha constituency: Kollam
- Vidhan Sabha constituency: Chathannoor

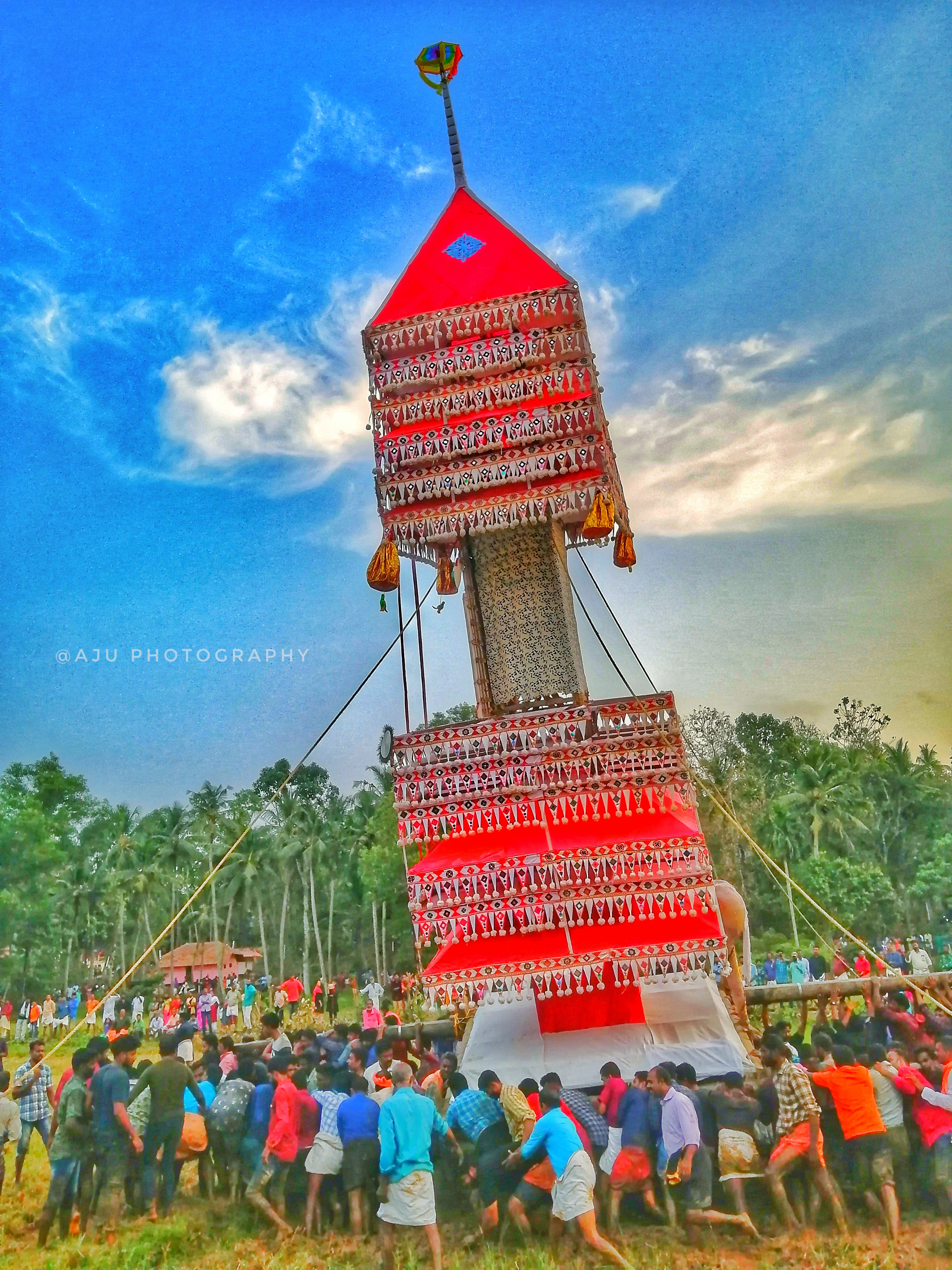
Chirakkara devi temple festival

Chirakkara is a village in Kollam district in the state of Kerala, India. Chirakkara is 16 km away from the town of Kollam and 8 km away from Paravur Town, which is famous for festivals, estuary, backwaters and beaches.

== Administration ==
2025 Local Body Election – Chirakkara Grama Panchayat
Ward No	Ward name	Member	Party	Alliance
1	Kochalummoodu	Bindu Sunil	CPI(M)	LDF
2	College Ward	Usha Jagadeesan	CPI(M)	LDF
3	Kannetta	Maya Suresh	CPI(M)	LDF
4	Eram South	Sreekumar (Chandu)	CPI(M)	LDF
5	Uliyanadu	Ambili Rajendran	BJP	NDA
6	Edavattam	Ullas Krishnan U S	Independent	OTH
7	Chirakkara	Sajana S	INC	UDF
8	Kulathoorkonam	Ramya M	BJP	NDA
9	Chirakkara Temple	Arya M	BJP	NDA
10	Chirakkarathazham	Kiran A S	INC	UDF
11	Kuzhuppil	Devidas (Kannan)	BJP	NDA
12	Polachira	Prameela	INC	UDF
13	Ozhukupara	Saritha	CPI(M)	LDF
14	Nedungolam	Ajitha Biju	INC	UDF
15	Malakkayal	Ratheesh M R (Unni)	BJP	NDA
16	Nedungolam West	Rajani Sajeev	BJP	NDA
17	Vilappuram	Ajitha Kumari	INC	UDF

== Demographics ==
As of 2011 India census, Chirakkara had a population of 17342 with 8007 males and 9335 females. Chirakkara is a village formed by dividing Meenad Village of Kollam Taluk of Kollam District. Likewise, Chirakkara is a Grama Panchayath formed by dividing Chathannoor Grama Panchayath. The developing tourist spot Polachira is at Chirakkara Grama Panchayath. Panchayath headquarters is at Chirakkarathazham. The place named Chirakkara is here where famous Devi Temple situates. Chirakkara is a rural area.

== Transportation ==
Chirakkara is just 2 km from Paravur-Parippally road. The nearest railway station is Paravur Railway Station, which is 8 km from Chirakkara. There is bus service from kottiyam through Chathannoor to Chirakkara.

== Temples ==
1) Chirakkara Devi Temple 2) Vilappuram Bhagavathy Temple 3) Kottekkunnu Subrahmanya Swami Temple 4) Chirakkara ayiravilly Temple 5) Yakshippura sreebhagavathi temple 6) Gurunagappan Temple Chirakkara-chirakkarathazham 7) Uliyanadu Mahadevar Temple 8) Ayyappa Temple, Kotheri 9) Mahadeva Temple, Chirakkarathazam 10) Vevukkonnam Temple, Chirakkara 11) Polachira Sree Mahavishnu Temple 12) Chamundeshwari deviTemple Kunnathoor 13) Vevukonam temple, Chirakkara 14) NagatharaMoorthy kavu, Chirakkara

== Institutions ==
1) S.N. College, Chathannoor 2) Government H.S., Uliyanad 3) Government H.S., Chirakkara. 4) Government H.S., Nedumgolam 5) Anandavilasam Library, Vilappuram 6) Chirakkara public library 7) Kairali Vayanashala (library) 8) Chirakkara Co-operative Bank 9) Indian Bank Chirakkara 10)DVLPS Puthenkulam(Devaraja Vilasom LP School)

== Places of interest ==
Anathavalam: The famous Anathavalam (The centre where domestic elephants are there) is just in its border.

Polachira: The best sight seeing place and foreign bird sanctuary.
