= Kalluvathukkal =

- Village
- Interactive map of Kalluvathukkal
- Coordinates: 8°49′57″N 76°44′43″E
- Country: India
- State: Kerala
- District: Kollam

Area
  - Total: 35.69 km^{2} (13.78 sq mi)

Population (2011)
  - Total: 21,555
  - Density: 604.0/km^{2} (1,564/sq mi)

Languages
  - Official: Malayalam, English
- PIN: 691578
- Area code: 0474-257****

Kalluvathukkal is a village in the Kollam district of the Indian state of Kerala. NH 47 passes through the village. The nearest towns are Chathannoor and Paripally. Kollam Government Medical College is only 3 km from Kalluvathukkal. There are lower primary and upper primary schools in the Kalluvathukkal panchayat. The panchayat also has its own school, offering classes from 5th to 10th standard. A small stadium is located next to the school. The place is infamous for the Kalluvathukkal hooch tragedy, which took place on 21 October 2000 and claimed 31 lives.

== Geography ==
Kalluvathukkal is located in the approximately 21 kilometers from Kollam city and 50 kilometers north of the state capital, Thiruvananthapuram.

== Demographics ==
According to the 2011 Census of India, Kalluvathukkal's population is 21,555 people, including 10,065 males and 11,490 females.

== Administration ==
2025 Local Body Election – Kalluvathukkal Grama Panchayat
Ward No	Ward name	Member	Party	Alliance
1	Ezhipuram	R. Muraleedharan	BJP	NDA
2	Chirakkara	N. Appukkuttan Pillai	BJP	NDA
3	Chavarkodu	S. Vijayan	CPI(M)	LDF
4	Kizhakkanela	Reena Mangalath	INC	UDF
5	Meenampalam	Sheeja N. R	CPI	LDF
6	Kadampattukonam	L. Bindu	CPI(M)	LDF
7	Ilamkulam	Hareesh Poovathoor	INC	UDF
8	Aduthala	Mercy Teacher	CPI	LDF
9	Nadakikkal	B. R. Deepa	BJP	NDA
10	Mevanakonam	S. Sathyapalan	BJP	NDA
11	Karimpaloor	Alli Aji	BJP	NDA
12	Pampuram	Ajayakumar D. L	CPI(M)	LDF
13	Parippally	N. Santhini	INC	UDF
14	Vattakuzhikkal	Sudeep	BJP	NDA
15	Velamannoor	Chandrika Teacher	CPI	LDF
16	Vilavoorkonam	P. Pratheesh Kumar	INC	UDF
17	Kulamada	D. Subhadramma	RSP	UDF
18	Kulathoorkonam	Ranjith (Thambikkuttan)	BJP	NDA
19	Kalluvathukkal	Rajani Rajan	INC	UDF
20	E S I	Baiju Lakshmanan	BJP	NDA

== Transport ==
Kollam Railway Station is 19 km from Kalluvathukkal, while Paravur Railway Station, which is 10 km away, and Varkala Railway Station, located 13 km away, are also nearby. Ten pairs of express trains stop at Paravur Railway Station. Kollam Railway Station is 22 km from the village, and the Chathannoor KSRTC depot is 5 km from Kalluvathukkal.

The nearest airport is Trivandrum International Airport, approximately 44 kilometers south on National Highway 66.

Kalluvathukkal is well-connected to major cities like Trivandrum, Alappuzha, Kochi, and Thrissur, as well as important towns such as Kollam, Paravur, Kottarakkara and Varkala via National Highway 66 (NH 66) and other state Public Works Department (PWD) roads.

== Notable people ==
- Kalaranjini, Chirakkara Devi temple near Kalluvathukkal is her ancestral family temple
- Urvashi (actress), Chirakkara Devi temple near Kalluvathukkal is her ancestral family temple
- Kalpana (Malayalam actress), Chirakkara Devi temple near Kalluvathukkal is her ancestral family temple
- Anwar Rasheed
