= G. Gangadharan Nair =

Indian academic (born 1946)

G. Gangadharan
- Born: G. Gangadharan Nair; October 2, 1946 (age 79); India

G. Gangadharan Nair (born October 2, 1946) is a Sanskrit scholar and a pioneer in the field of spoken Sanskrit. He has a PhD in Sanskrit grammar and Master of Arts degrees in Russian and Sanskrit. He has taught in Sanskrit colleges and universities. He was the research guide of Fathima Beevi, "the first Muslim lady to get her PhD in Vedanta (the supreme branch of Hindu philosophy)".

== Early life and education ==
Nair was born on October 2, 1946, at Vazhoor, Kerala as son of V. K. Gopala Pillai, a freedom fighter and a scholar of Sanskrit and indigenous medicine. He had his traditional education of Sanskrit Grammar from Swami Vidyananda Tirthapada, grand disciple of Chattampi Swamikal. He had Oriental and Western type of Sanskrit education, especially of Sanskrit Grammar and linguistics in the Government Sanskrit College, Thiruvananthapuram and the University of Kerala. At the same time, he received Master of Arts degree in Russian language and literature from the Department of Russian, University of Kerala. He studied under M. H. Shastri(whom he later succeeded in the Government Sanskrit College, Trivandrum). He obtained his PhD degree for his thesis on the Unadi Sutras, Ancient Indian etymological treatise under the guidance of V. Venkatasubramania Iyer and R. Karunakaran.

== Career ==
He was professor and head of Department of Sanskrit Grammar and director of planning and development in the Sree Sankaracharya University of Sanskrit, Kalady. He was member of the senate of the Cochin University of Science and Technology, member of the senate of Rashtriya Sanskrit University, Tirupati. He was expert member in the faculty of Oriental studies, A.P. Singh University, Rewa, Madhya Pradesh. He is a UGC nominee on the advisory committee of DRS programme of the Department of Sanskrit, Rabindra Bharati University, Kolkota. He is currently the Dean of Faculty of Sanskrit Grammar of the Sree Sankaracharya University of Sanskrit, Kalady. He is also the chairman of the academic council of Sukrtindra Oriental Research Institute, Cochin and member of the editorial board of the journal of the same institute. He has done extensive research on Indian theories of hermeneutics and has made valuable contribution to the studies on ancient hermeneutics. His paper on Non-Paninian Influence on Narayanabhatta is considered an extensive study on the alternative pargmatice approaches to Paninian Grammar in Sanskrit.
