= G. Prathapa Varma Thampan =

Indian politician and social worker

Adv. G.Prathapa Varma Thampan

Member of Kerala Legislative Assembly
- In office 2001–2006
- Constituency: Chathannoor

Personal details
- Born: G.Prathapa Varma Thampan; 20 September 1959 Adoor
- Died: 4 August 2022 (aged 62)
- Party: Indian National Congress
- Spouse: Deepa Thampan
- Children: 1 son, 1 daughter
- Education: Post Graduate, LL.B, Doctorate in Political Science
- Occupation: Politician, Advocate

G.Prathapa Varma Thampan was an Indian politician and social worker who was a member of the 11th Kerala Legislative Assembly representing Chathannoor assembly constituency.

== Early life and family ==
G. Prathapa Varma Thampan was born on 20 September 1959 in Adoor, Kerala, to P. Gopala Panicker and K. Bharathi. He was married to Deepa Thampan and had one son and one daughter.He began his political career as a student activist, becoming president of the Kerala Students Union (KSU) school unit before rising through the party ranks. He later served in leadership roles including Youth Congress State General Secretary, KSU General Secretary, State Treasurer, and as a member of the Kerala Pradesh Congress Committee executive. During his career spanning over four decades, he represented the Chathannoor constituency in the 11th Kerala Legislative Assembly (2001–2006) and also served as president of the Kollam District Congress Committee from 2012 to 2014.

== Political career ==
Thampan was a member of the Indian National Congress and represented Chathannoor Assembly constituency in the 11th Kerala Legislative Assembly from 2001 to 2006.

He also served as President of the Kollam District Congress Committee until he was succeeded by V. Sathyaseelan.

Thampan began his political journey in the Kerala Students Union (KSU), serving in roles including State Executive Member (1979–80), State Convenor of Kalavedhi (1983–84), and State General Secretary (1985–86). He later joined the Youth Congress, holding positions such as Executive Member (1986–88) and State General Secretary (1988–2000).

He also served as Executive Member of the Kerala Pradesh Congress Committee (KPCC), President of the Kollam District Congress Committee (DCC), and was twice a member of the Kerala University Senate. Additionally, he held the position of President of the Peroor Service Co-operative Bank.

== Death ==
Thampan passed away on 4 August 2022. His death was widely reported in Kerala media, including The New Indian Express, Keralakaumudi Daily, Onmanorama, and The Hindu.
