= Polachira =

Polachira (Kadichira)
- Village
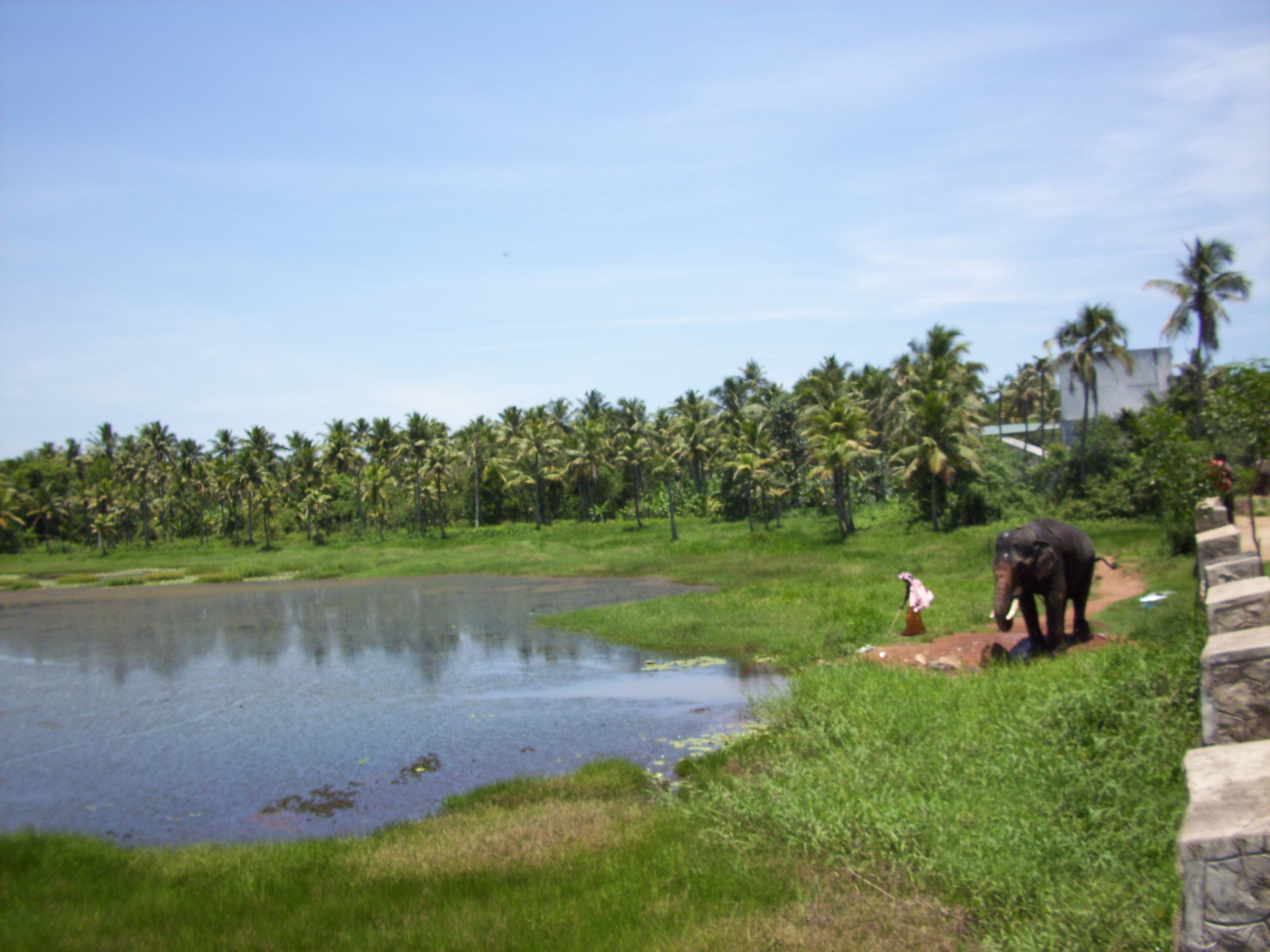
- Village scene
- Interactive map of Polachira
- Coordinates: 8°50′26.89″N 76°42′0.3″E
- Country: India
- State: Kerala
- District: Kollam

Government
  - Body: Chirakkara Grama Panchayat

Languages
  - Official: Malayalam, English
- Time zone: UTC+5:30 (IST)
- PIN: 691572
- Telephone code: 0474
- Vehicle registration: KL-02
- Nearest city: Paravur
- Lok Sabha constituency: Kollam
- Civic agency: Chirakkara Grama Panchayat

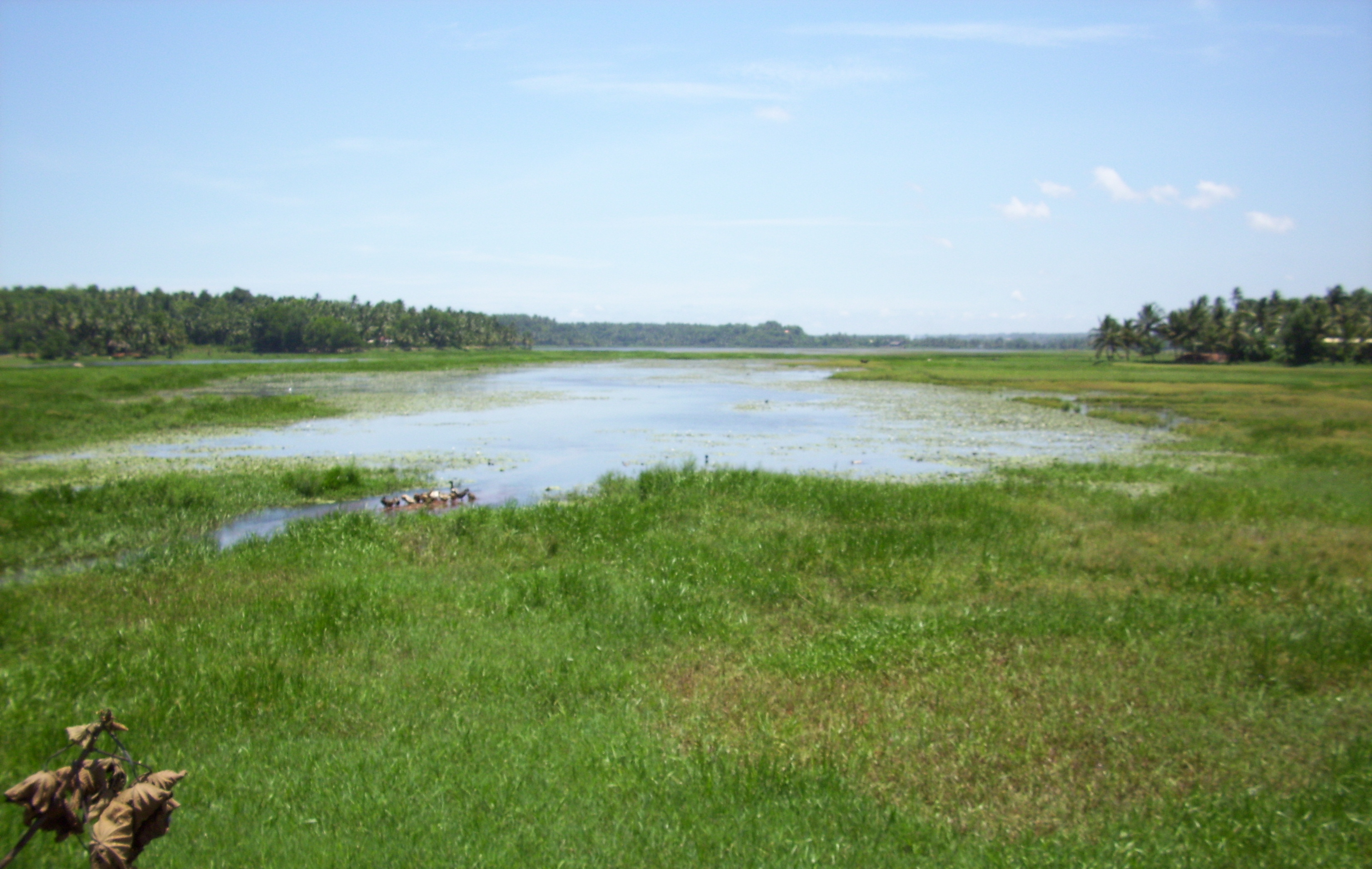
Migratory Birds

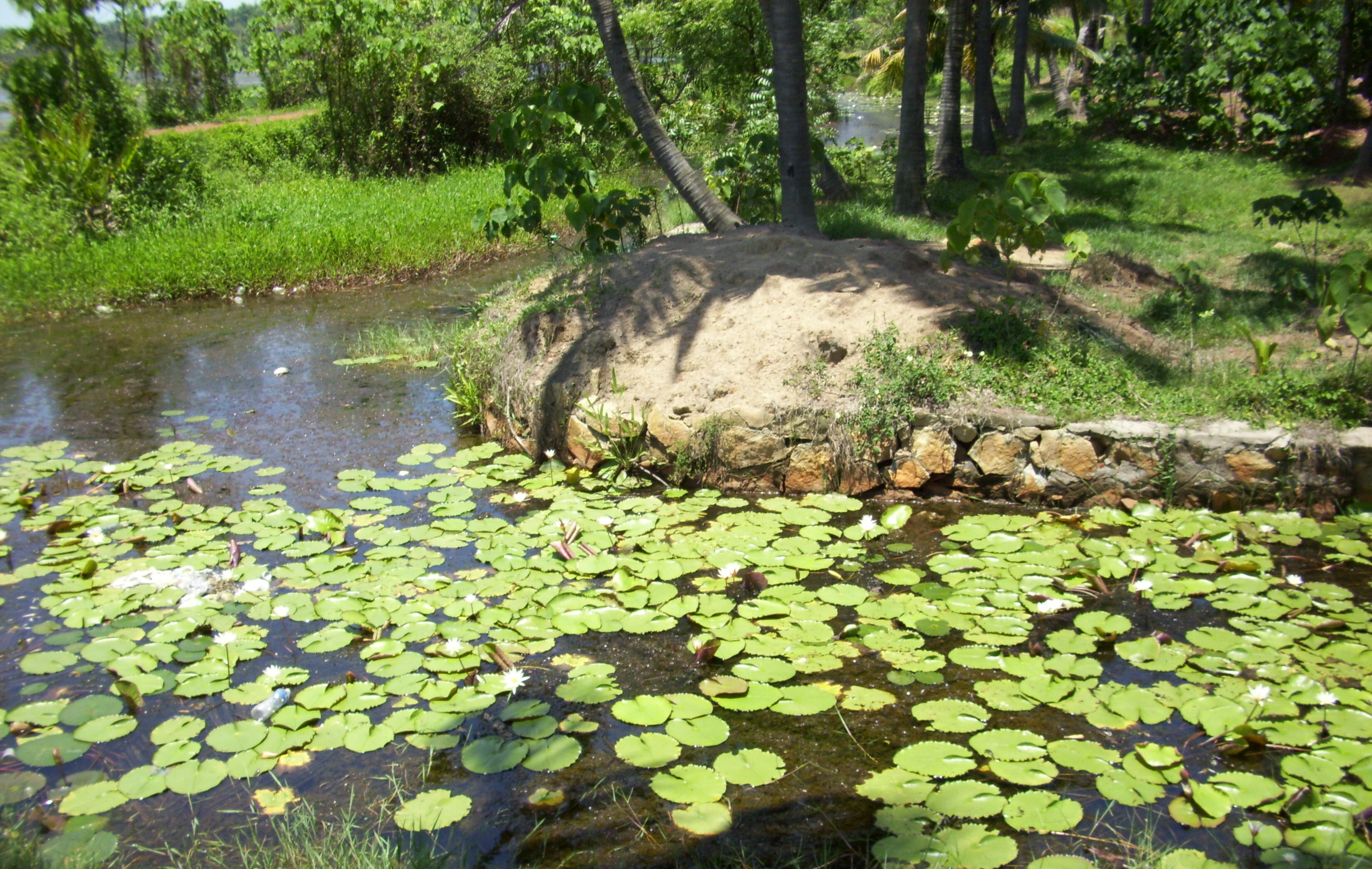
Ambalkkulam

Polachira is a wetland spread over 600 hectares located near Paravur Municipality in Kollam District of Kerala, India. Formerly part of the Chathannoor Grama Panchayath, it is now located in the Chirakkara Grama Panchayath. Polachira is about 2 km south of Chathannoor town and 9 km north east of Paravur town. Chathannoor-Polachira-Ozhukupara Bund Across Road is the main access to Paravoor.

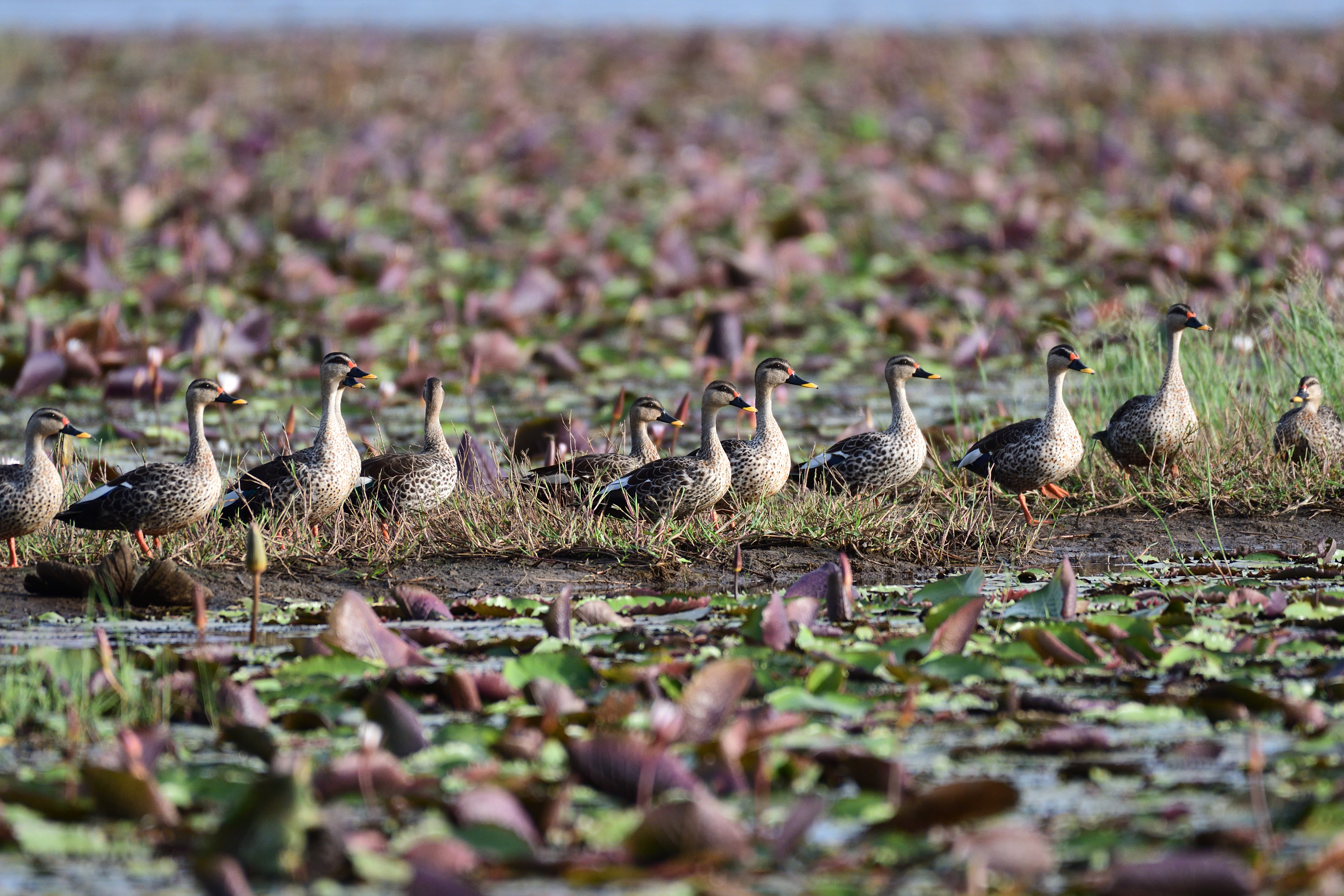
Indian Spot Billed Duck from Polachira by Dr Jishnu R

== Migratory Birds ==
As a result of the biodiversity and abundance of fish and mussels, Polachira is a favorite destination for migratory birds. Polachira recorded over 151 species which includes perigin falcon (the fastest bird on earth), spot billed pelicon, white stork, painted storks and plenty of duck species. Monthly birdwalks are conducted by group of people from kollam birding battalion.

== Agriculture ==
Polachira consists entirely of paddy fields where farmers can cultivate paddy three times a year (Moonupoovu Nilam). As the soil has high fertility value there is no need of fertilizer to cultivate paddy which will give high yields to the farmers. However, the main problem faced by farmers is that the fields are covered with water for the whole year. If needed, farmers' association takes initiatives to dry the fields by using water pumps, but it is very expensive and local self-government authorities help is needed for it to take place.

If the fields in Polachira get dry and are suitable for paddy cultivation during May, November and January. Unscientific construction of bund affected three times paddy cultivations.

Consequently, there are complaints from farmers that the authorities of the local self-government intend to catch and sell fish from Polachira by drying its fields and have no intention to help the farmers in their paddy cultivation.

== Tourism ==
There is a high scope to develop Polachira as a tourist spot. But the relevant authorities have not yet taken action for it. Presence of wildlife especially migratory birds, pleasant weather, picturesque landscape makes it an ideal destination for nature lovers. An organization formed in the name of Ithikkara-Polachira Tourism Development Agency with an aim to explore Polachira's tourism possibilities, owing to certain reasons, is not working now.

== Important institutions ==
Important institutions near Polachira:
Chathannoor Ghss Chirakkara Devi Temple
Kottekkunnu Subrahmanian Temple
Vilappuram Devi Temple
Chathannoor S.N. College
Nss chathannoor
Govt. H.S.S., Nedungolam
Govt. H.S., Uliyanad
Govt. H.S., Chirakkara
Meenadu LP school
Ozhukupara Govt W L P School
Government Medical College Kollam
Lord krishna residential school B R Hospital and Research centre. Nedungolam

== See also ==
- Paravur
- Paravur Railway Station
- Kollam
- Kollam district
- Kollam Junction railway station
- Chathannoor
