= Adichanalloor =

Adichanalloor Adichanallur
- village
- Location in Kerala, India Adichanalloor (India)
- Coordinates: 8.882560°N 76.713130°E
- Country: India
- State: Kerala
- District: Kollam

Government
  - Body: Grama Panchayat

Population (2011)
  - Total: 27,240

Languages
  - Official: Malayalam, English
- Time zone: UTC+5:30 (IST)
- PIN: 691573
- Telephone code: 0474
- Vehicle registration: KL-2
- Nearest city: Kollam
- Literacy: 92.03%
- Lok Sabha constituency: Kollam
- Vidhan Sabha constituency: Chathannoor

Adichanalloor is a village and grama panchayat in Kollam district in the state of Kerala, India.

== General ==
As of 2011 India census, Adichanalloor had a population of 27240 with 12559 males and 14681 females.
