= J. Chitharanjan =

Indian politician and labor leader

Member of the Rajya Sabha
- In office 1997–2003

Minister of Health, Government of Kerala
- In office 11 April 1977 – 18 November 1978
- Preceded by: N. K. Balakrishnan
- Succeeded by: K.P. Prabhakaran
- Constituency: Chathannoor

Personal details
- Born: 22 October 1927 Kollam Kerala, India
- Died: 13 June 2008 (aged 80)
- Party: Communist Party of India
- Spouse: Shrimati L. Ambiga Chitharanjan
- Children: 1 son, 2 daughters
- Education: Union Christian College, Alwaye

Janardhanan Asan Chitharanjan (22 October 1927 – 13 June 2008) was an Indian labor leader, politician, a leader of the Communist Party of India (CPI). He was the president of CPI's Trade Union wing AITUC, a Minister in the state and was a member of the Rajya Sabha.

Chitharanjan was elected to Kerala Assembly in 1977, 1980 and 1987 from his home district of Kollam.

His parents were Janardhanan Asan and Meenakshi Amma. His electoral life started with a contest with his uncle Divakarappanikker who was an important Congress leader.
