= N. Anirudhan =

Indian politician

N. Anirudhan (born 20 September 1943) is an Indian politician and leader of Communist Party of India. He represented the Chathannoor constituency in the 10th and 12th Kerala Legislative Assembly. Also he is the member of CPI National council.
