= Pooyappally =

- village
- Location in Kerala, India Pooyappally (India)
- Coordinates: 8°54′0″N 76°45′0″E
- Country: India
- State: Kerala
- District: Kollam

Population (2011)
  - Total: 24,447

Languages
  - Official: Malayalam, English
- Time zone: UTC+5:30 (IST)
- PIN: 691537
- Telephone code: 0474-246----
- Vehicle registration: KL 02 and KL 24

Pooyappally is a village in Kollam district in the state of Kerala, India.

== Demographics ==
As of 2011 India census, Pooyappally had a population of 24447 with 11445 males and 13002 females.

Kerala State Road Transport Corporation bus services to nearby towns are available regularly. Kollam-Kulathupuzha limited stop chain service every 20 min.
