= Kollam =

City in Kerala, India

Kollam Kollaṃ (Malayalam) Quilon
- Metropolis
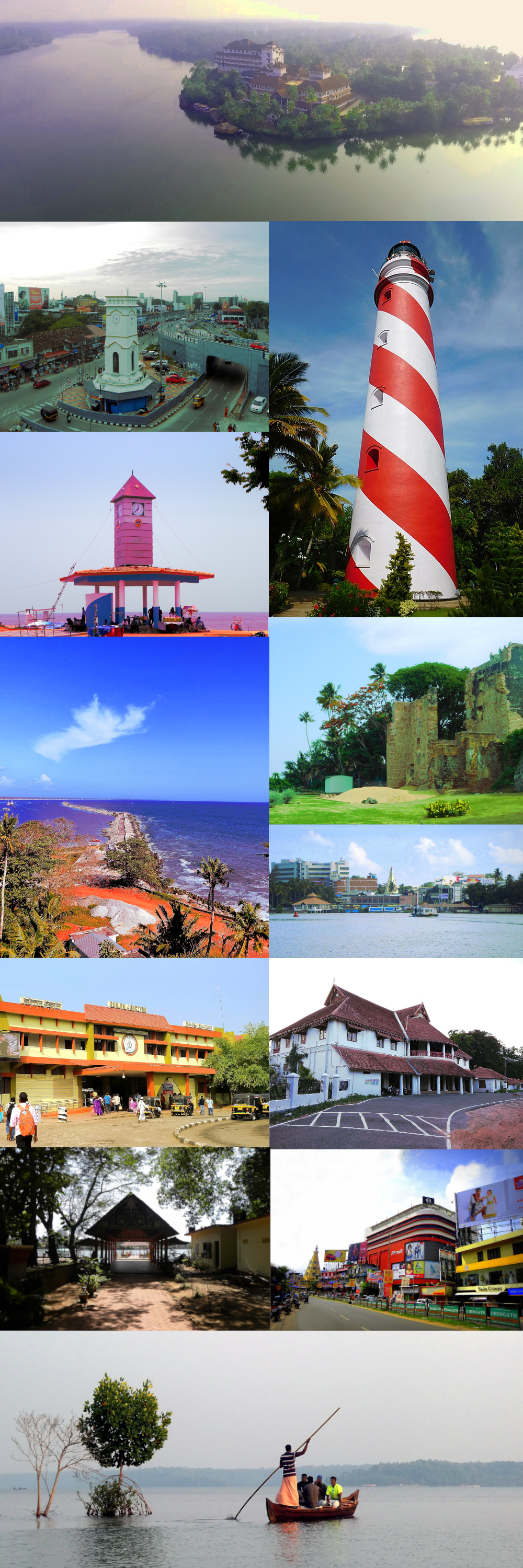
- From top clockwise: an aerial view of the Ashtamudi Lake & The Raviz, Thangasseri Lighthouse, Ruins of St Thomas Fort, Kollam KSRTC bus station & KSWTD Boat Jetty, British Residency, Downtown Kollam area including RP Mall, Tourists in Munroe Island, Adventure Park, Kollam Junction railway station, Break Water Tourism & Kollam Port, Kollam Beach and Chinnakada Clock Tower
- Etymology: Black pepper: kola ("black pepper")
- Nicknames: "Prince of Arabian sea" "Cashew Capital of the World" "The Gateway to Backwaters" "Fountain of Youth"
- Location of the city within Kollam Metropolitan Area

- Kollam (India) Kollam (Kerala)
- Coordinates: 8°53′35.5″N 76°36′50.8″E
- Country: India
- Region: South India
- State: Kerala
- District: Kollam
- Established: 823
- Founder: Maruvān Sapir Iso (as Port City); Rama Varma Kulashekhara (as administrative capital)

Government
  - Type: Municipal Corporation
  - Body: Kollam Municipal Corporation
  - Mayor: A.K Hafeez (INC)

Area
  - Metropolis: 73.03 km^{2} (28.20 sq mi)
  - Rank: 4
- Elevation: 38.32 m (125.7 ft)

Population (2011)
  - Metropolis: 397,419
  - Rank: 5 (41th IN)
  - Density: 5,442/km^{2} (14,090/sq mi)
  - Metro: 1,871,086
- Demonym(s): Kollamite, Kollathukaaran/kaari, Kollamkaran/kaari

Languages
  - Official: Malayalam; English
- Time zone: UTC+5:30 (IST)
- PIN: 691 XXX
- Telephone code: +91474xxxxxxx
- Vehicle registration: Kollam- KL 02, Karunagapally- KL 23, Kottarakkara- KL 24, Punalur- KL 25, Kunnathur- KL 61, Pathanapuram- KL 80, Chadayamangalam- KL 82
- HDI: High
- Literacy: 91.18%
- UN/LOCODE: IN QUI; IN KUK
- Website: www.kollam.nic.in

Kollam (Malayalam: [kolːɐm]; (Note: (/ˈkwaɪ.lɒn/ KWAI-lon; locally /kɔɪ.lɒn/ KOY-lon))) is an ancient seaport and the fourth largest city in the Indian state of Kerala. Located on the southern tip of the Malabar Coast of the Arabian Sea, the city is on the banks of Ashtamudi Lake and is 71 kilometres (44 mi) northwest of Thiruvananthapuram. Kollam is one of India's oldest continuously inhabited cities, with evidence of habitation stretching back to the megalithic period. The city has also been a maritime entrepôt for millennia, with the earliest attestation dating to the Phoenicians and Romans. It is the gateway to the Backwaters of Kerala, and is known for its cashew processing, coir manufacturing, and tourism industries.

Kollam has had a commercial reputation since ancient times. The Arabs, Phoenicians, Chinese, Ethiopians, Syrians, Jews, Chaldeans, and Romans have all engaged in trade at the port of Kollam for millennia. Because of Chinese trade, Ibn Battuta mentioned Kollam in the 14th century as one of the five Indian ports he had seen during his twenty-four-year travels. Desinganadu's Rajas exchanged embassies with Chinese rulers while there was a flourishing Chinese settlement at Kollam. In the ninth century, on his way to Canton, China, Persian merchant Sulaiman al-Tajir found Kollam to be the only port in India visited by huge Chinese junks. Marco Polo, the Venetian traveller, who was in Chinese service under Kublai Khan in 1275, visited Kollam and other towns on the west coast, in his capacity as a Chinese mandarin. Kollam is also home to one of the seven churches that were established by St Thomas as well as one of the 10 oldest mosques believed to have been founded by Malik Deenar in Kerala. Roman Catholic Diocese of Quilon is the first diocese in India.

V. Nagam Aiya in his Travancore State Manual records that in 822 AD two East Syriac bishops, Mar Sabor and Mar Proth, settled in Quilon with their followers. Two years later, the Malabar Era began (824 AD), and Quilon became the premier city of the Malabar region ahead of Travancore and Cochin. Kollam Port was founded by Mar Sabor at Tangasseri in 825 as an alternative to reopening the inland seaport of Kore-ke-ni Kollam near Backare (Thevalakara), which was also known as Nelcynda and Tyndis to the Romans and Greeks and as Thondi to the Tamils. Thambiran Vanakkam, printed in the Tamil language on 20 October 1578 at Kollam, was the first book to be published in an Indian language.

The Kollam Municipal Corporation received ISO 9001:2015 certification for municipal administration and services. According to a survey conducted by the Economist Intelligence Unit (EIU) based on urban area growth during January 2020, Kollam became the tenth fastest-growing city in the world with a 31.1% urban growth between 2015 and 2020. It is a coastal city on the banks of Ashtamudi Lake. The city hosts the administrative offices of Kollam district and is a prominent trading city for the state. The proportion of females to males in Kollam city is second-highest among the 500 most populous cities in India. Kollam is also one of the least polluted cities in India.

During the later stages of the rule of the Chera monarchy in Kerala, Kollam emerged as the focal point of trade and politics. Kollam continues to be a major business and commercial centre in Kerala. There are four major trading centres around Kollam. These include Kottarakara, Punalur, Paravur, and Karunagapally. Kollam appeared as Palombe in Mandeville's Travels, where he claimed it contained a Fountain of Youth.

== Etymology ==
The popular theory is that the name "Kollam" is derived from the word koyillam, which is a compound of kovilakam (meaning "Royal Palace") and illam (a traditional house of Nair nobles or Brahmins). Another theory posits that the name originates from the Sanskrit word kollam, which means "pepper," as the region was historically a prominent centre for the trade and export of pepper.

In 825 AD, the Malayalam calendar, or Kollavarsham, was introduced at meetings held in the city. The present Malayalam calendar is said to have begun with the re-founding of the town, which was rebuilt after its destruction by fire.

The city was known as Koolam in Arabic, Coulão in Portuguese, and Desinganadu in ancient Tamil literature.

== History ==
Names, routes and locations of the Periplus of the Erythraean Sea (1st century CE)

As the ancient city of Quilon, Kollam was a flourishing port during (c. 3rd century BC–12th century), and later became the capital of the independent Venadu or the Kingdom of Quilon on its foundation in c. 825 by Maruvān Sapir Iso. Kollam was considered one of the four early entrepots in global sea trade during the 13th century, along with Alexandria and Cairo in Egypt, the Chinese city of Quanzhou, and Malacca in the Malaysian archipelago. It seems that trade at Kollam flourished right into the Medieval period, as in 1280, there is an instance of envoys of Yuan China coming to Kollam to establish relations between the local ruler and China.

Sangam Era ( 3rd - 7th Century)

During the Sangam Era Kollam was ruled by the Ay Dynasty. Ay Titian and Ay Andiran are rulers mentioned in the Sangam Literature and can be found in the Akananuru and Purananuru corpus.Kollam functioned as a maritime and logistics outpost of the Ay Kingdom.

Kollam Era (8th Century)

In 825 CE the maritime outpost of Kollam was developed into a major trading port by Syrian Christian Magnate Marwan Sapir Iso, commencing the Malayalam calendar which is also known as Kollavarsham.

Manigramam & Anjuvannam Guilds (8th - 11th Century)

The presence of Indian and International guilds such as Manigramam and Anjuvannam during the Kollam Era attest to the importance they played in influencing the development of Kollam port and laying the foundation for Kerala's maritime culture. Both guilds are mentioned as part of Quilon Syrian copper plates

=== Pandya Invasion (12th Century) ===
The ancient political and cultural history of Kollam was almost entirely independent from that of the rest of Kerala. The Chera dynasty governed the area of the Malabar Coast between Alappuzha in the south and Kasaragod in the north. This included Palakkad Gap, Coimbatore, Salem, and Kolli Hills. The region around Coimbatore was ruled by the Cheras during the Sangam period between c. the first and the fourth centuries CE, and it served as the eastern entrance to the Palakkad Gap, the principal trade route between the Malabar Coast and Tamil Nadu. However, the southern region of present-day Kerala state (the coastal belt between Thiruvananthapuram and Alappuzha) was under the Ay dynasty and during the 12th Century the Pandya dynasty of Madurai invaded Kollam under King Maravarman Kulasekara Pandyan I.

Cosmas Indicopleustes, a Greek Nestorian sailor, in his book the Christian Topography, who visited the Malabar Coast in 550, mentions an enclave of Christian believers in Male (Malabar Coast). He writes, "In the island of Tabropane (Ceylon), there is a church of Christians, and clerics and faithful. Likewise at Male, where the pepper grows, and in the farming community of Kalliana (Kalliankal at Nillackal), there is also a bishop consecrated in Persia in accordance with the Nicaea Sunnahadose of 325 AD."

Maruvān Sapir Iso established a Christian church near Kollam port, with the donation of the Venad king Ayyanatikal. The church, known as Tarisappalli, became the recipient of the Kollam Copper plate grant issued by the king.

Kollam is also home to one of the oldest mosques in the Indian subcontinent. According to Qissat Shakarwati Farmad, the Masjids at Kodungallur, Kollam, Madayi, Barkur, Mangalore, Kasaragod, Kannur, Dharmadam, Panthalayini, and Chaliyam were built during the era of Malik Dinar, and they are among the oldest Masjids in the Indian subcontinent. It is also believed that Malik Dinar died at Thalangara in Kasaragod town.

=== Capital of Venadu (9th to 12th centuries) ===
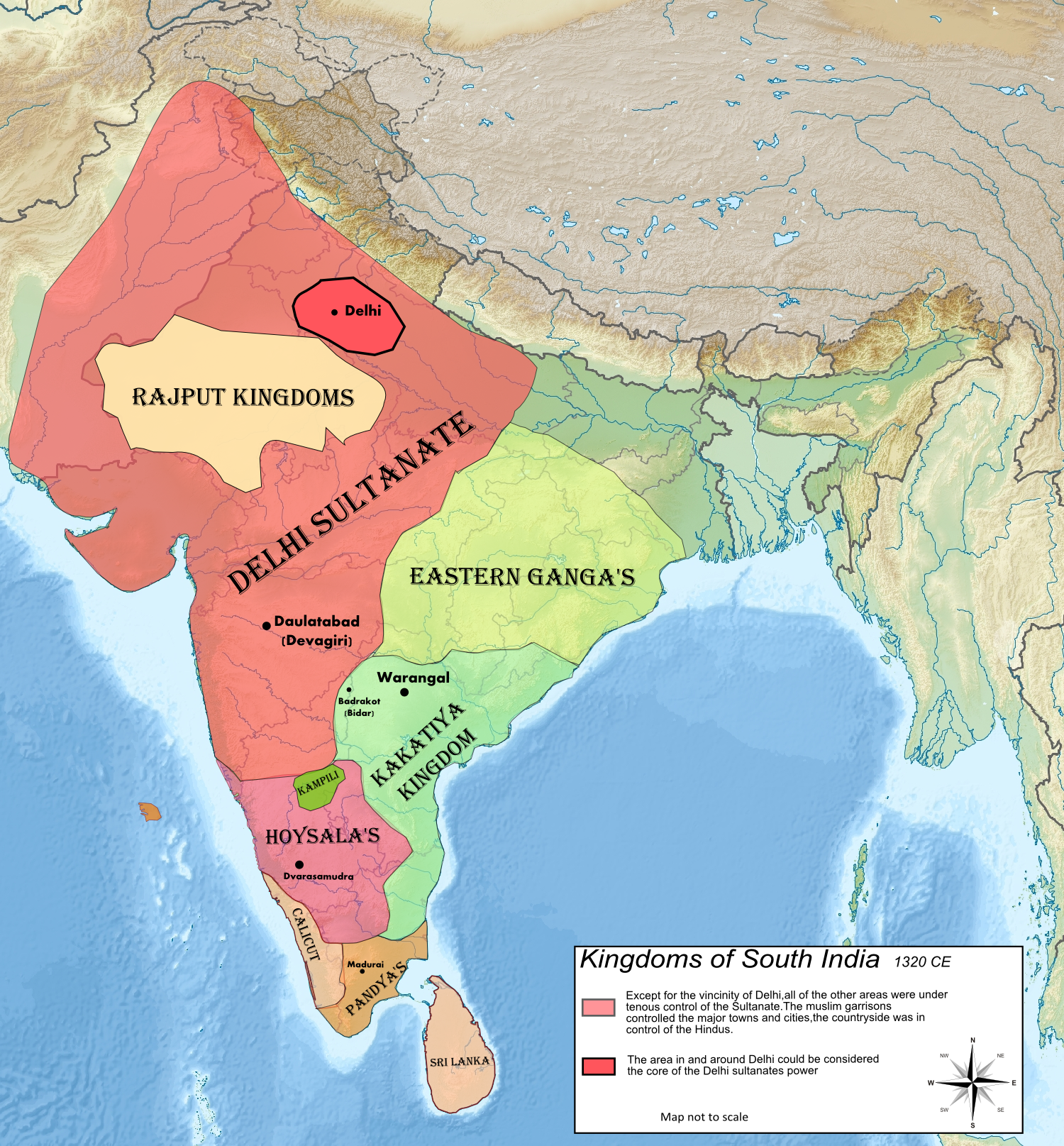
South Asia in 1320 CE

The port at Kollam, then known as Quilon, was founded in 825 by the Nestorian Christians, Mar Sabor and Mar Proth, with the sanction of Ayyanadikal Thiruvadikal, the king of the independent Venadu or the State of Quilon, a feudatory under the Chera kingdom.

It is believed that Mar Sapor Iso also proposed that the Chera king create a new seaport near Kollam in lieu of his request that he rebuild the almost vanished inland seaport at Kollam (kore-ke-ni) near Backare (Thevalakara), also known as Nelcynda and Tyndis to the Romans and Greeks and as Thondi to the Tamils, which had been without trade for several centuries because the Cheras were overrun by the Pallavas in the sixth century, ending the spice trade from the Malabar coast. This allowed the Nestorians to stay in the Chera kingdom for several decades and introduce the Christian faith among the Nampoothiri Vaishnavites and Nair sub-castes in the St. Thomas tradition, with the Syrian liturgy as a basis for the Doctrine of the Trinity, without replacing the Sanskrit and Vedic prayers. The Tharisapalli plates presented to Maruvan Sapor Iso by Ayyanadikal Thiruvadikal granted the Christians the privilege of overseeing foreign trade in the city as well as control over its weights and measures in a move designed to increase Quilon's trade and wealth. Hermann Gundert views Maruvan Sapir Iso as being granted land to build the Tharissapally Church and to organise the Manigramam trading guild at Kollam.

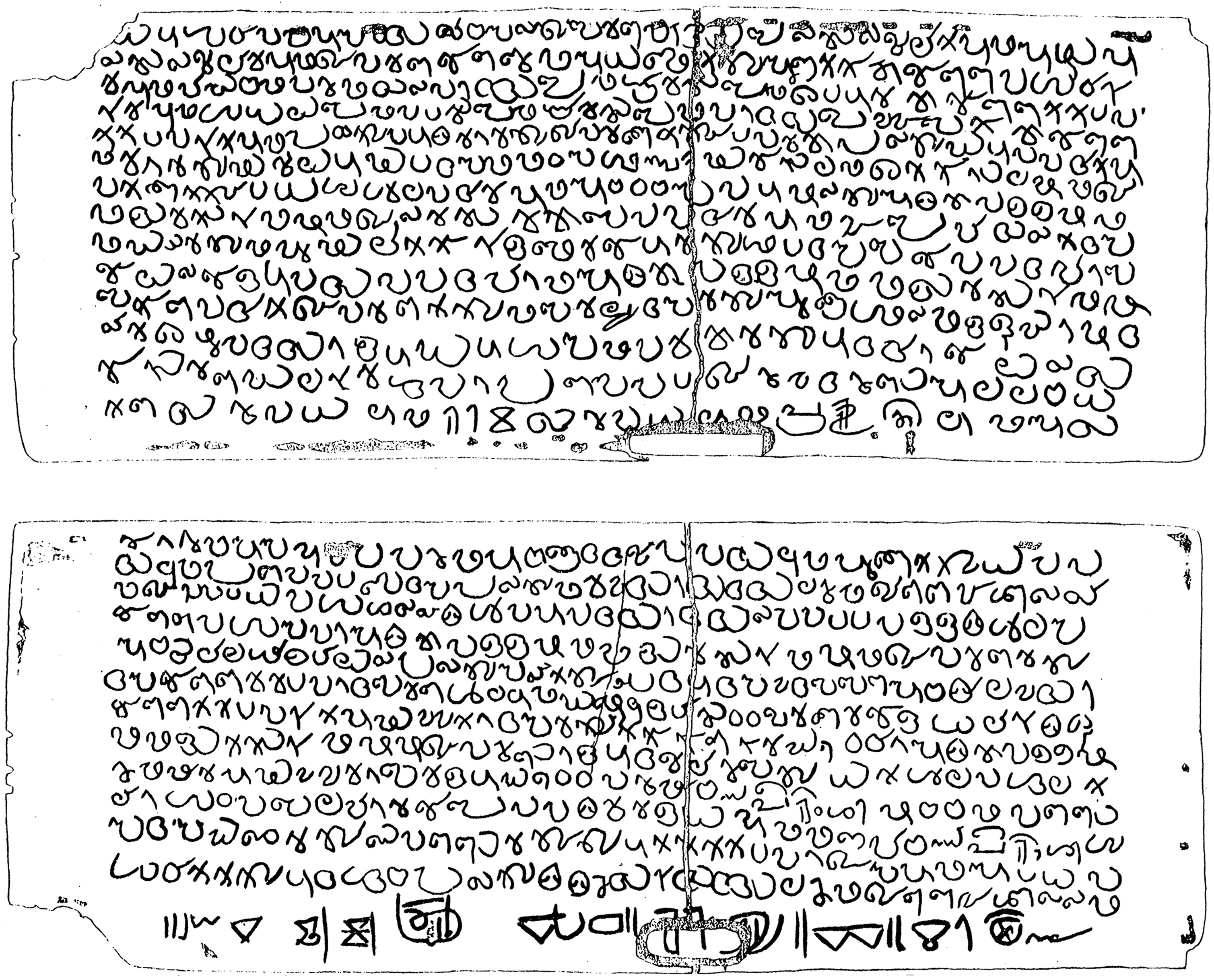
Quilon Syrian copper plates (849 AD) PLATE 3

Thus began the Malayalam Era, known as Kolla Varsham after the city, indicating the importance of Kollam in the ninth century. The Persian merchant Soleyman of Siraf visited Malabar in the ninth century and found Quilon to be the only port in India used by the huge Chinese ships as their transshipment hub for goods on their way from China to the Persian Gulf. The rulers of Kollam (formerly called 'Desinganadu') had trade relations with China and exchanged embassies. According to the records of the Tang dynasty (618–913), Quilon was their chief port of call before the seventh century. Chinese trade decreased around 600 and was revived again in the 13th century. Mirabilia Descripta by Bishop Catalani gives a description of life in Kollam, which he saw as the Catholic bishop-designate to Kollam, the oldest Catholic diocese in India. He also gives true and imaginary descriptions of life in 'India the Major' in the period before Marco Polo visited the city. Sulaiman al-Tajir, a Persian merchant who visited Kerala during the reign of Sthanu Ravi Varma (9th century CE), records that there was extensive trade between Kerala and China at that time, based at the port of Kollam.

=== Kollam as "Colombo" in the Catalan Atlas (1375) ===
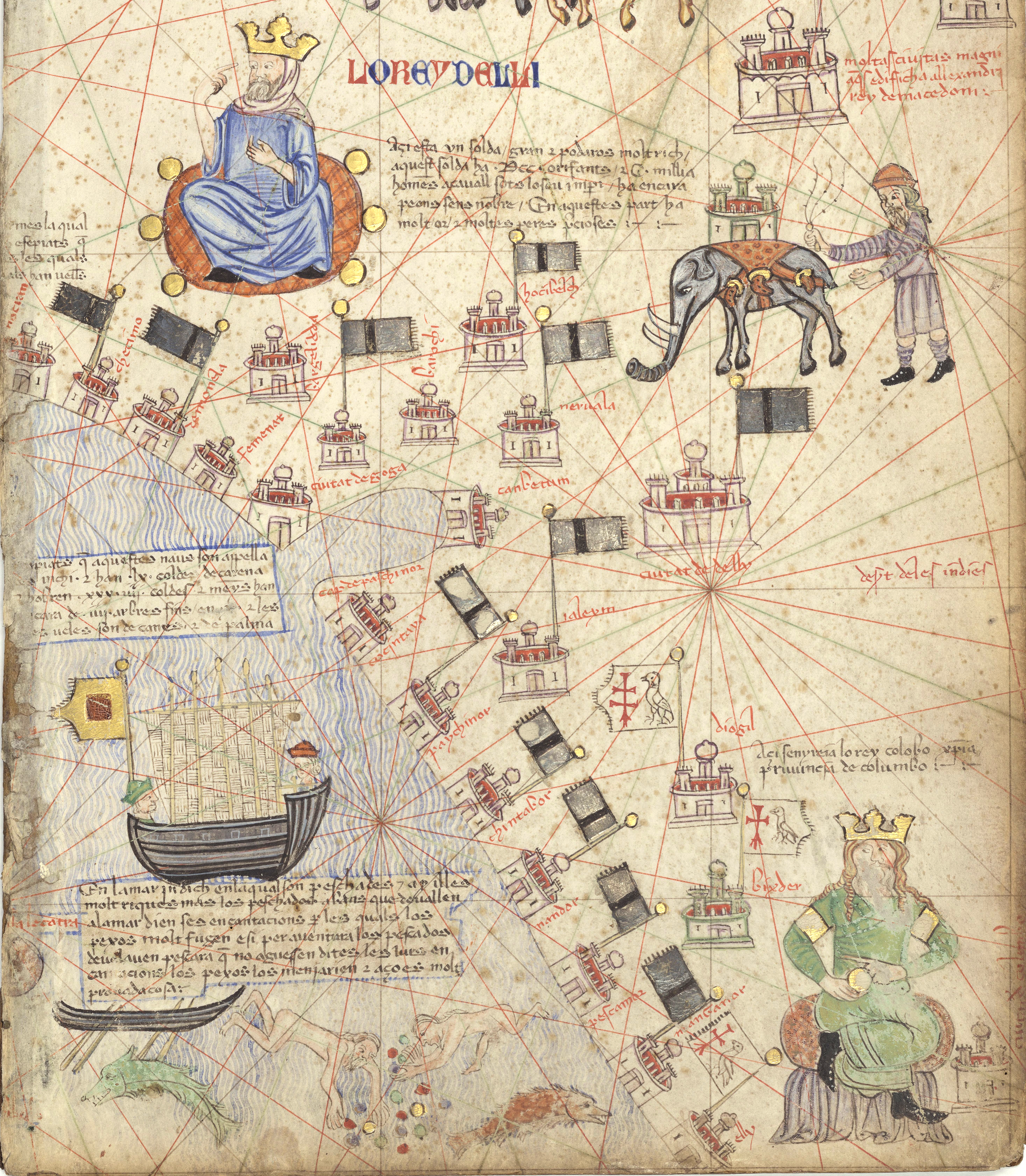
Sultan of Delhi (top, flag:) and the "King of Colombo" (Kollam) at the bottom (flag:, identified as Christian due to the early Saint Thomas Christianity there, and the Catholic mission under Jordanus since 1329) in the contemporary Catalan Atlas of 1375. Several of the location names are accurate. The caption next to the southern king reads: "Here rules the king of Colombo, a Christian."

In the 13th century CE, Maravarman Kulasekara Pandyan I, a Pandya ruler, fought a war in Venadu and captured the city of Kollam. The city appears on the Catalan Atlas of 1375 CE as Columbo and Colobo. The map marks this city as a Christian city, ruled by a Christian ruler.

The text above the picture of the king says:

Açí seny[o]reja lo rey Colobo, christià. Pruvíncia de Columbo
(Here reigns the Lord King Colobo, Christian, Province of Columbo).

The city was founded in 825 by Maruvān Sapir Iso, a Persian East Syriac Christian merchant, and was also Christianised early by the Saint Thomas Christians. In 1329 CE, Pope John XXII established Kollam / Columbo as the first and only Roman Catholic bishopric on the Indian subcontinent, and appointed Jordan of Catalonia, a Dominican friar, as the diocese's first bishop of the Latin sect.

=== Portuguese, Dutch and British Trade and Influences (16th to 18th centuries) ===
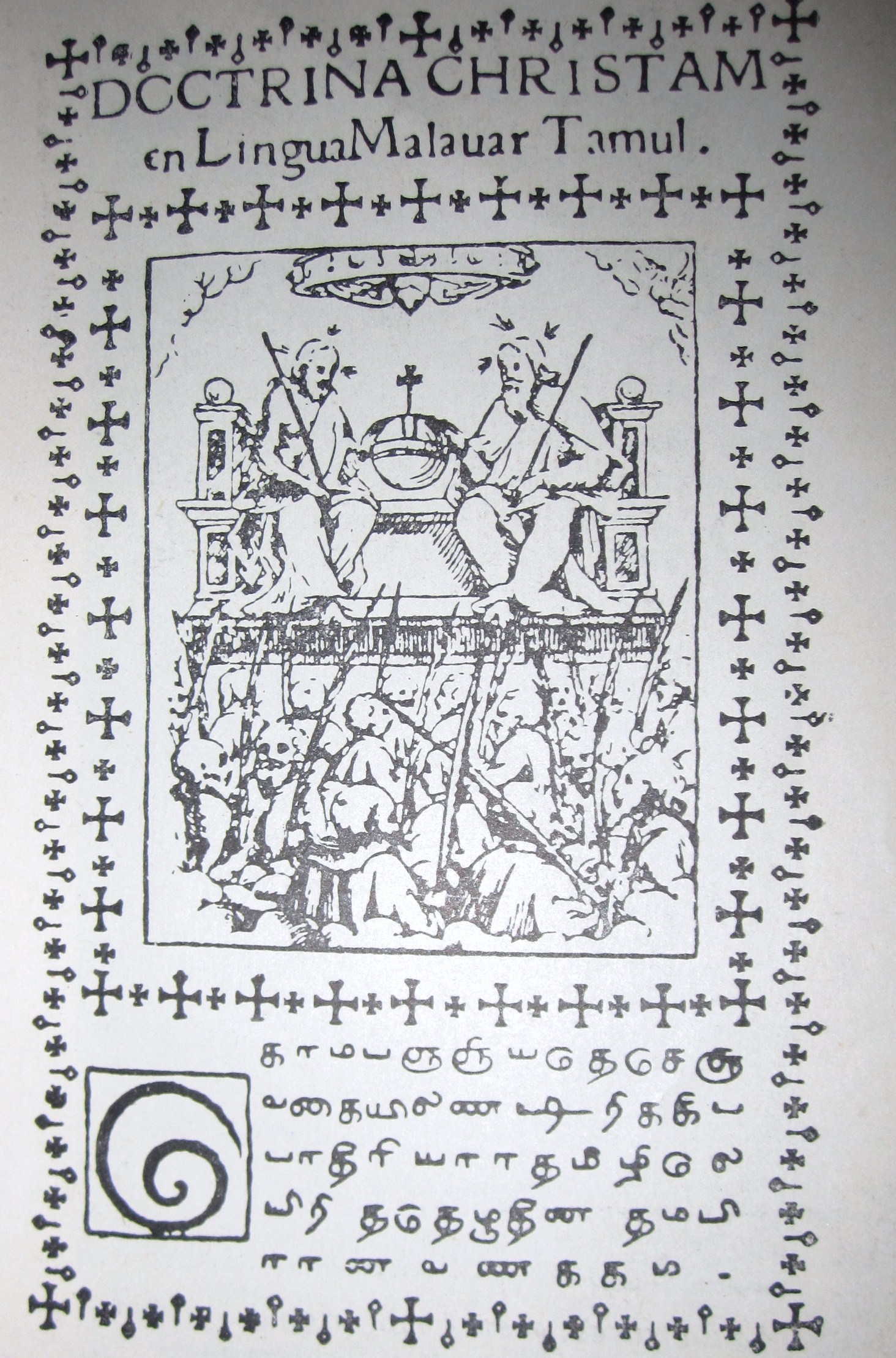
Thambiran Vanakkam

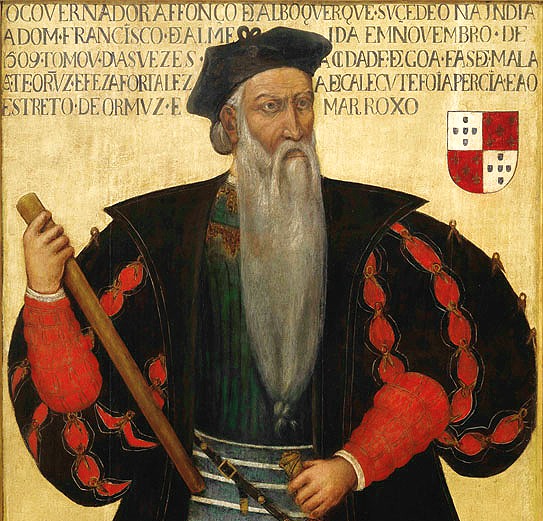
Viceroy Afonso de Albuquerque

The Portuguese arrived at Kappad Kozhikode in 1498 during the Age of Discovery, thus opening a direct sea route from Europe to India. They were the first Europeans to establish a trading centre in Tangasseri, Kollam in 1502, which became the centre of their trade in pepper. In the wars with the Moors/Arabs that followed, the ancient church (temple) of St. Thomas tradition at Thevalakara was destroyed. In 1517, the Portuguese built the St. Thomas Fort in Thangasseri, which was destroyed in the subsequent wars with the Dutch. In 1661, the Dutch East India Company took possession of the city. The remnants of the old Portuguese Fort, later renovated by the Dutch, can be found at Thangasseri.

In the 18th century, Travancore conquered Kollam, followed by the British in 1795. Thangasseri remains today as an Anglo-Indian settlement, though few Anglo-Indians remain. The Infant Jesus Church in Thangasseri, an old Portuguese-built church, remains as a memento of the Portuguese rule of the area.

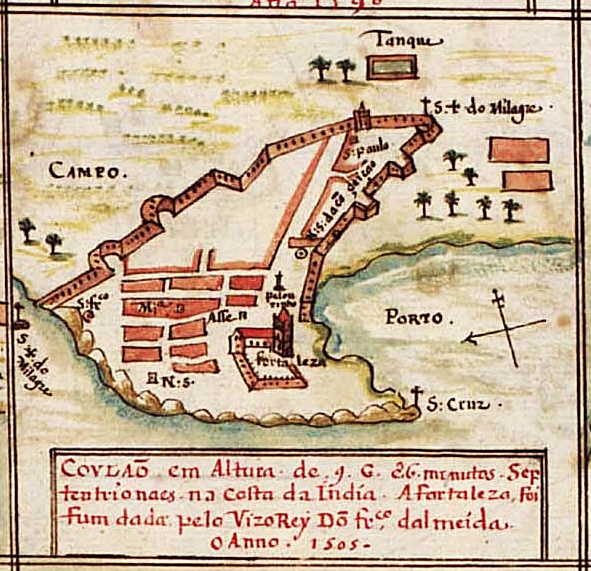
Kollam in the 1500s

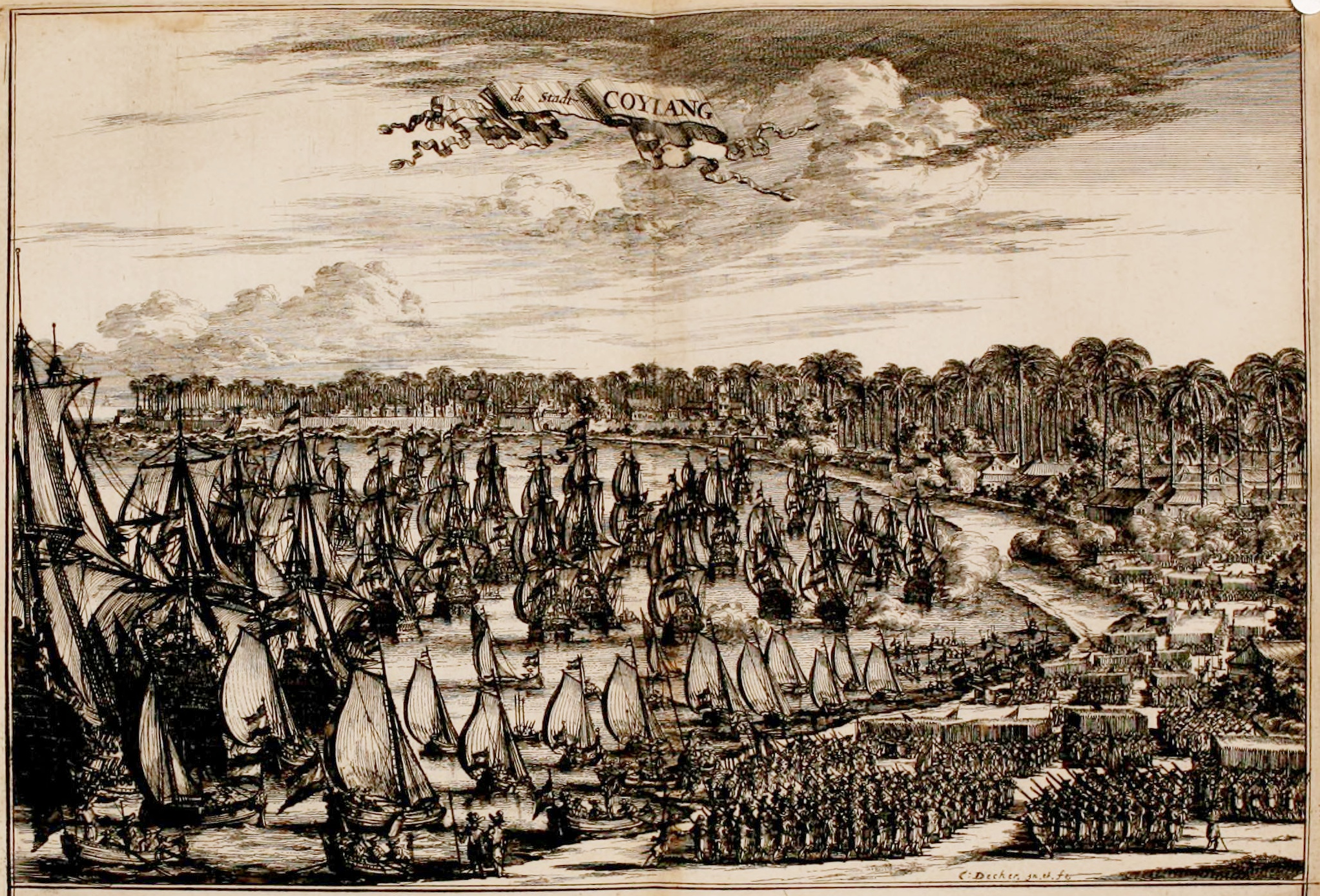
Capture of Kollam in 1661

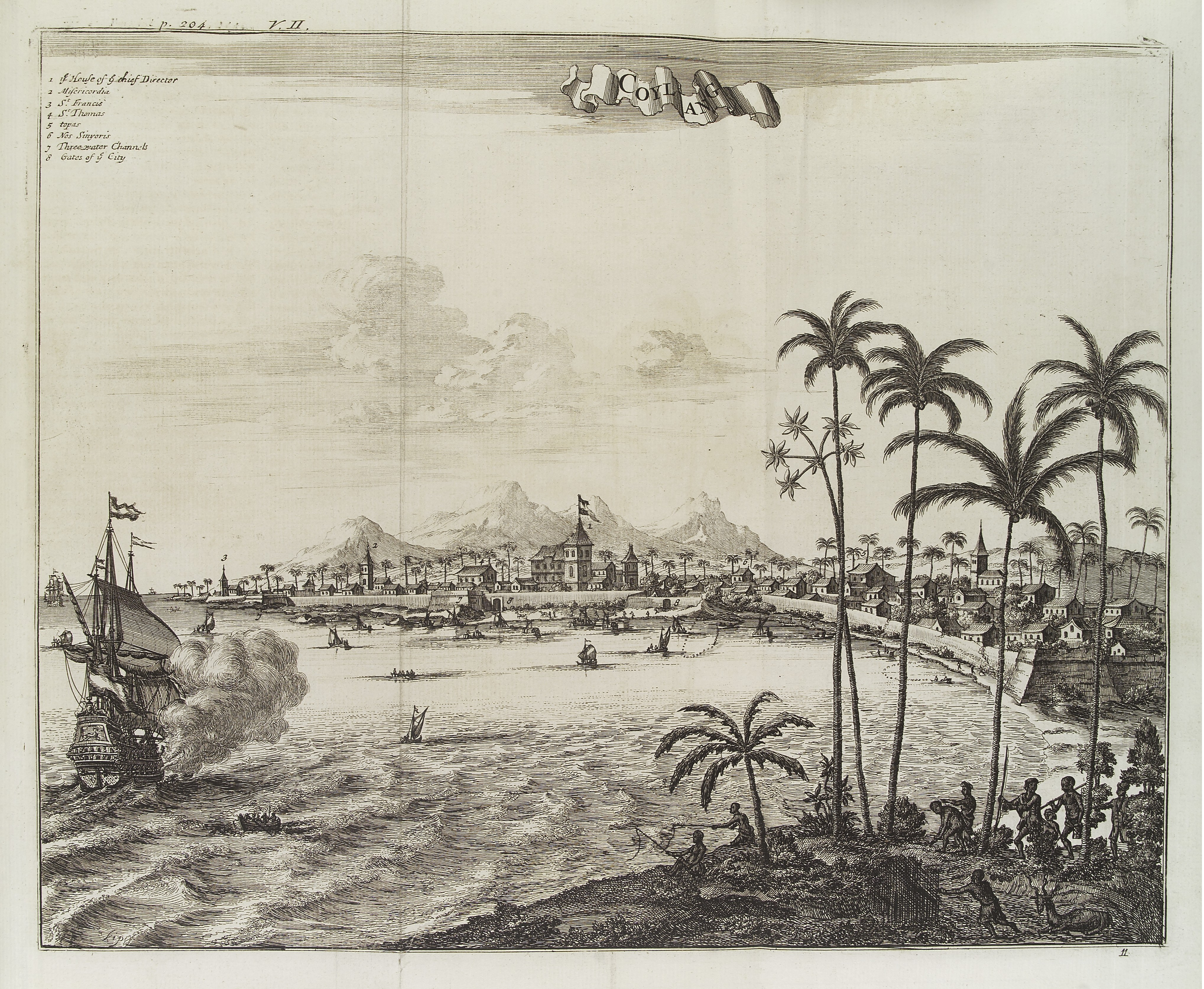
Kollam in the 1700s

=== Battle of Quilon ===
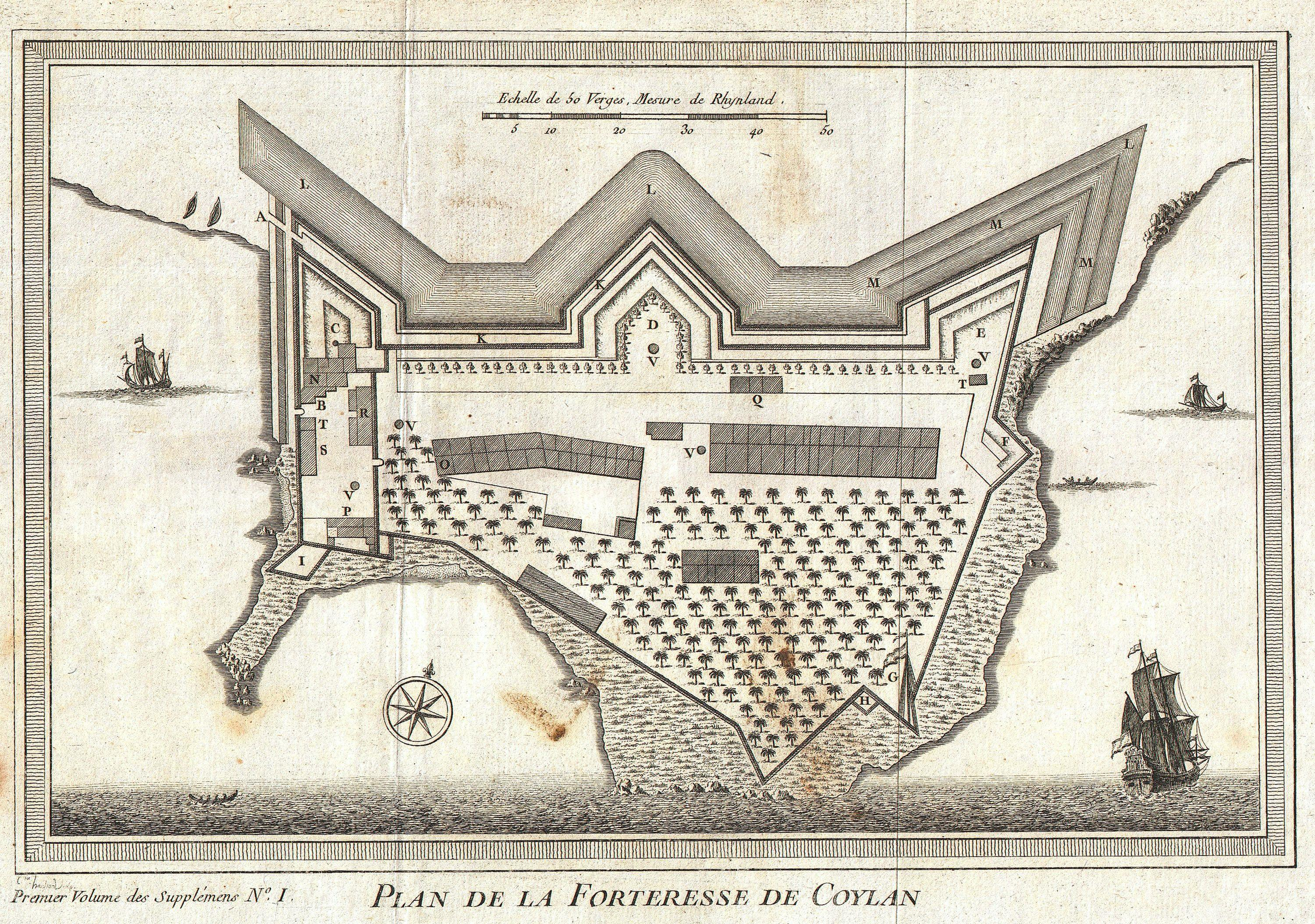
Kollam fort in 1756 after it had passed from Portuguese rule to the Dutch

The Battle of Quilon was fought in 1809 between a troop of the Indian kingdom of Travancore led by the then Dalawa (prime minister) of Travancore, Velu Thampi Dalawa, and the British East India Company led by Colonel Chalmers at Cantonment Maidan in Quilon. The battle lasted for only six hours and was the result of the East India Company's invasion of Quilon and their garrison situated near the Cantonment Maidan. The company forces won the battle, while insurrectionists who participated in the war were court-martialled and subsequently hanged at the maidan.

=== Travancore Rule ===
In the early 18th century CE, the Travancore royal family adopted some members from the royal family of Kolathunadu based at Kannur, and Parappanad based in present-day Malappuram district.

Travancore became the most dominant state in Kerala by defeating the powerful Zamorin of Kozhikode in the battle of Purakkad in 1755. The Government Secretariat was also situated in Kollam till the 1830s. It was moved to Thiruvananthapuram during the reign of Swathi Thirunal.

=== Excavation at Kollam Port seabed ===
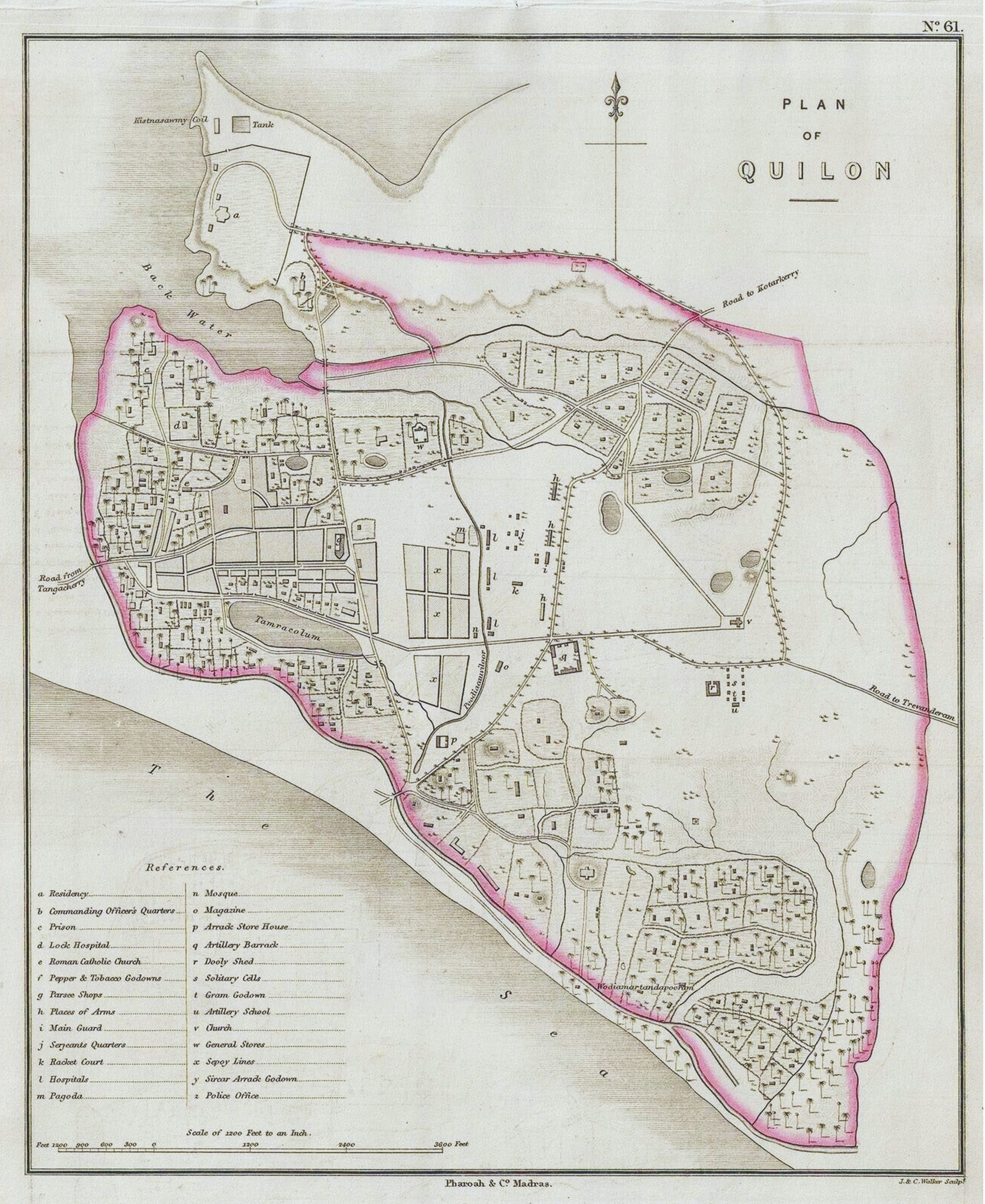
Plan of Kollam, 1850s

Excavations have been ongoing at the Kollam Port premises since February 2014. The team has uncovered arrays of antique artifacts, including Chinese porcelain and coins. A Chinese team with the Palace Museum, a team from India with Kerala Council for Historical Research (KCHR), discovered Chinese coins and artifacts that show trade links between Kollam and ancient China.

== Geography ==
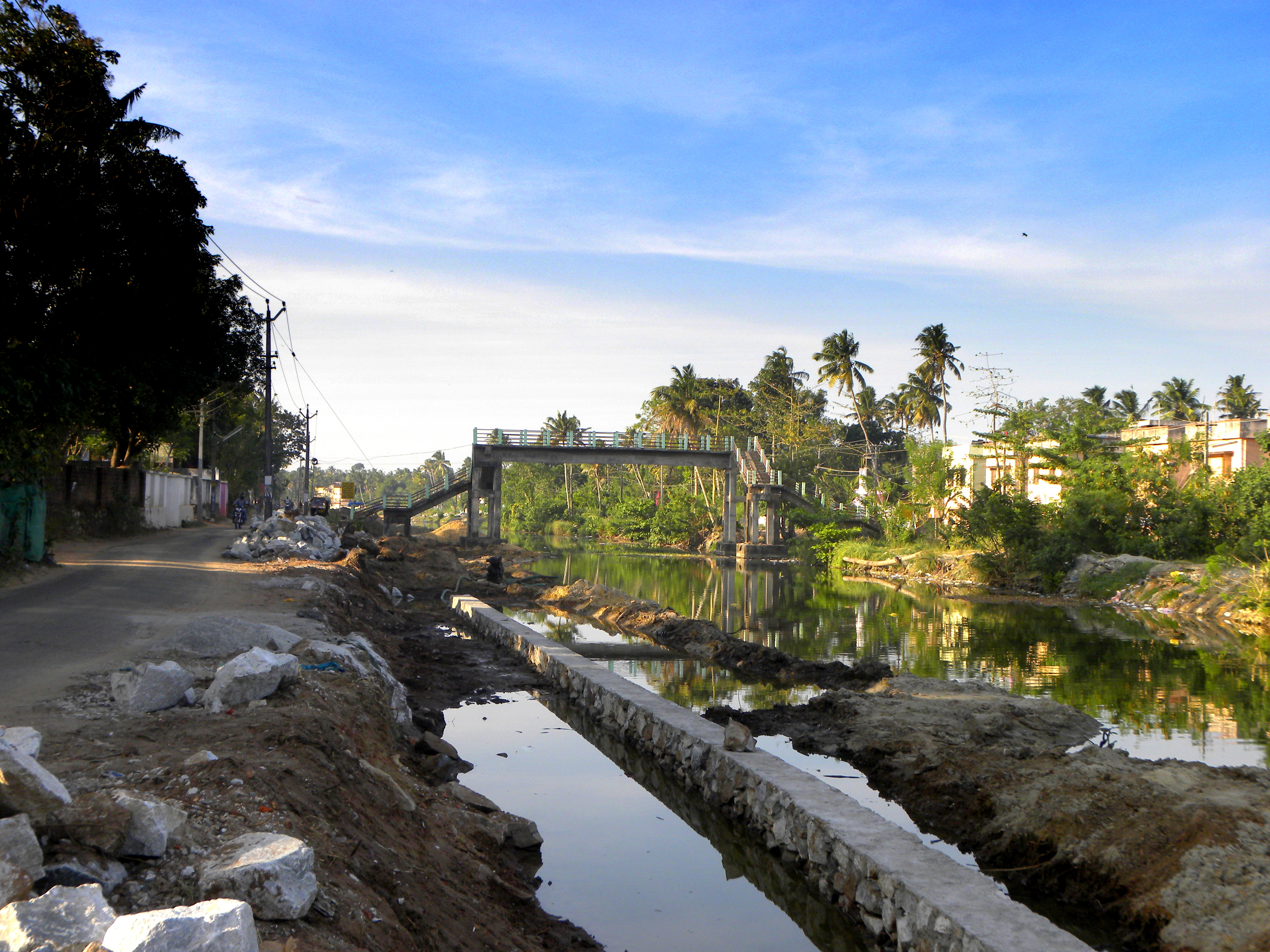
Kollam Canal near Paravur

Kollam city is bordered by the panchayats of Neendakara and Thrikkaruva to the north, Mayyanad to the south, and Thrikkovilvattom and Kottamkara to the east, and by the Laccadive Sea to the west. Ashtamudi Lake is in the heart of the city. The city is about 71 km (44 mi) from Thiruvananthapuram, 140 km (87 mi) from Kochi, and 350 km (220 mi) from Kozhikode. The National Waterway 3 and Ithikkara River are two important waterways passing through the city. The 7.7 km (4.8 mi) long Kollam Canal connects Paravur Lake and Ashtamudi Lake. The Kallada River, another river that flows through the suburbs of the city, empties into Ashtamudi Lake, while the Ithikkara River runs to Paravur Kayal. Kattakayal, a freshwater lake in the city, connects another water body named Vattakkayal with Lake Ashtamudi.

In March 2016, IndiaTimes selected Kollam as one of the nine least polluted cities on earth. Kollam is one among the top 10 most welcoming places in India for the year 2020, according to Booking.com's traveller review awards.

Kollam is an ancient trading town – trading with Romans, Chinese, Arabs, and other Orientals. The details are mentioned in historical citations dating back to Biblical times and the reign of Solomon, connecting with Red Sea ports of the Arabian Sea (supported by a find of ancient Roman coins). There was also internal trade through the Aryankavu Pass in Schenkottah Gap, connecting the ancient town to Tamil Nadu. The overland trade in pepper by bullock cart and the trade over the waterways connecting Alappuzha and Cochin established trade linkages that enabled it to grow into one of the earliest Indian industrial townships. The rail links later established to Tamil Nadu supported still stronger trade links. The factories processing marine exports and the processing and packaging of cashew nuts extended its trade across the globe.

Climate data for Kollam
Month	Jan	Feb	Mar	Apr	May	Jun	Jul	Aug	Sep	Oct	Nov	Dec	Year
Mean daily maximum °C (°F)	31 (88)	31 (88)	32 (90)	32 (90)	31 (88)	29 (84)	29 (84)	29 (84)	29 (84)	30 (86)	29 (84)	30 (86)	30 (86)
Mean daily minimum °C (°F)	23 (73)	23 (73)	25 (77)	26 (79)	25 (77)	24 (75)	24 (75)	24 (75)	24 (75)	24 (75)	24 (75)	23 (73)	24 (75)
Average rainfall mm (inches)	18 (0.7)	26 (1.0)	53 (2.1)	147 (5.8)	268 (10.6)	518 (20.4)	381 (15.0)	248 (9.8)	209 (8.2)	300 (11.8)	208 (8.2)	51 (2.0)	2,427 (95.6)
Average rainy days (≥ 0.1 mm)	1	2	4	8	11	21	19	16	12	12	8	3	117
Source: Weather2Travel

== Demographics ==
=== Population ===
As of the 2011 India census, Kollam city had a population of 348,657. The sex ratio (the number of females per 1,000 males) was 1,075, the highest in the state. Total literates in Kollam city are 297,030 of which 144,599 are males while 152,431 are females. Average literacy rate of Kollam city is 94.12 percent of which male and female literacy was 95.64 and 92.73 percent. In May 2015, the Government of Kerala decided to expand the City Corporation of Kollam by merging Thrikkadavoor panchayath. With the merger, the area is expected to become 73.03 km^{2} (28.20 sq mi) with a total city population of 384,892.

Malayalam is the most widely spoken language and official language of the city, while Tamil is understood by some sections in the city. There are also small communities of Anglo-Indians, Konkani Brahmins, Telugu Chetty, and Bengali migrant labourers settled in the city. For ease of administration, Kollam Municipal Corporation is divided into six zones with local zonal offices for each one.

- Central Zone (headquartered at Cantonment), Kollam Municipal Corporation
- Sakthikulangara Zone, Kollam Municipal Corporation
- Vadakkevila Zone, Kollam Municipal Corporation
- Kilikollur Zone, Kollam Municipal Corporation
- Eravipuram Zone, Kollam Municipal Corporation
- Thrikkadavoor Zone, Kollam Municipal Corporation

In 2014, former Kollam Mayor, Prasanna Earnest, was selected as the Best Lady Mayor of South India by the Rotary Club of Trivandrum Royal.

=== Religion ===
Religion in Kollam City (2011)
Religion	Percentage
Hinduism	56%
Islam	22%
Christianity	21%
Others	1%
Distribution of religions †Includes Not Stated, Sikhism (<0.01%), Buddhism (<0.01%).

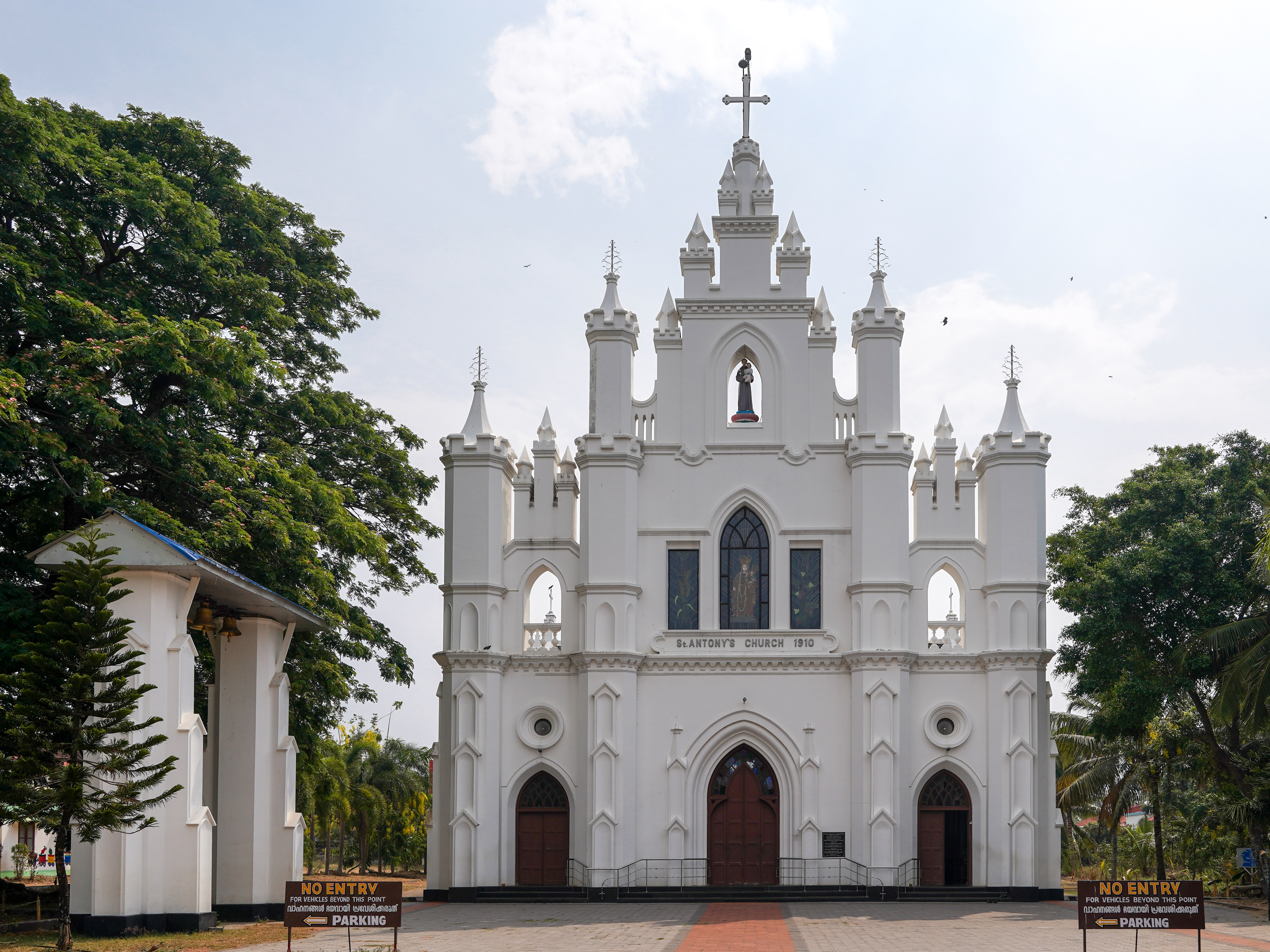
St. Antony's Church, Vaddy, built 1910

The city of Kollam is a microcosm of Kerala state with its residents belonging to varied religious, ethnic and linguistic groups. There are so many ancient temples, centuries-old churches and mosques in the city and its suburbs. Kollam is a Hindu-majority city in Kerala. 56.35% of Kollam's total population belongs to the Hindu community. Moreover, the Kollam Era (also known as Malayalam Era or Kollavarsham or Malayalam Calendar or Malabar Era), a solar and sidereal Hindu calendar used in Kerala, originated in 825 CE (Pothu Varsham) at the city of (Kollam).

Muslims account for 22.05% of Kollam's total population. As per the Census 2011 data, 80,935 is the total Muslim population in Kollam. It's the only district in south Kerala where Muslims constitute the largest minority community rather than Christians. The Karbala Maidan and the adjacent Makani mosque serve as the Eid gah for the city. The 300-year-old Juma-'Ath Palli at Karuva houses the mortal remains of a Sufi saint, Syed Abdur Rahman Jifri.

Christians account for 21.17% of the total population of Kollam city. The Roman Catholic Diocese of Quilon (Kollam) is the first Catholic diocese in India. The diocese was first erected by Pope John XXII on 9 August 1329. It was re-erected on 1 September 1886. The diocese covers an area of 1,950 km^{2} (750 sq mi) and contains a population of 4,879,553, Catholics numbering 235,922 (4.8%). The famous Infant Jesus Cathedral, 400 years old, located in Thangassery, is the co-cathedral of the Roman Catholic Diocese of Quilon. CSI Kollam-Kottarakara Diocese is one of the twenty-four dioceses of the Church of South India. The Kerala headquarters of The Pentecostal Mission for Kottarakkara is in Kollam.

== Civic administration ==
Map of Kollam Metropolitan Area

The present mayor of Kollam Corporation is Adv. V. Rajendrababu of CPI(M).

=== Urban structure ===
With a total urban population of 1,187,158 and 349,033 as the city corporation's population, Kollam is the fourth most populous city in the state and 49th on the list of the most populous urban agglomerations in India. As of 2011, the city's urban growth rate of 154.59% was the second highest in the state. The Metropolitan area of Kollam includes Uliyakovil, Adichanalloor, Adinad, Ayanivelikulangara, Chavara, Chavara South, Elampalloor, Eravipuram (Part), Kallelibhagom, Karunagappally, Kollam, Kottamkara, Kulasekharapuram, Mayyanad, Meenad, Nedumpana, Neendakara, Oachira, Panayam, Panmana, Paravur, Perinad, Poothakkulam, Thazhuthala, Thodiyoor, Thrikkadavoor, Thrikkaruva, Thrikkovilvattom, and Vadakkumthala.

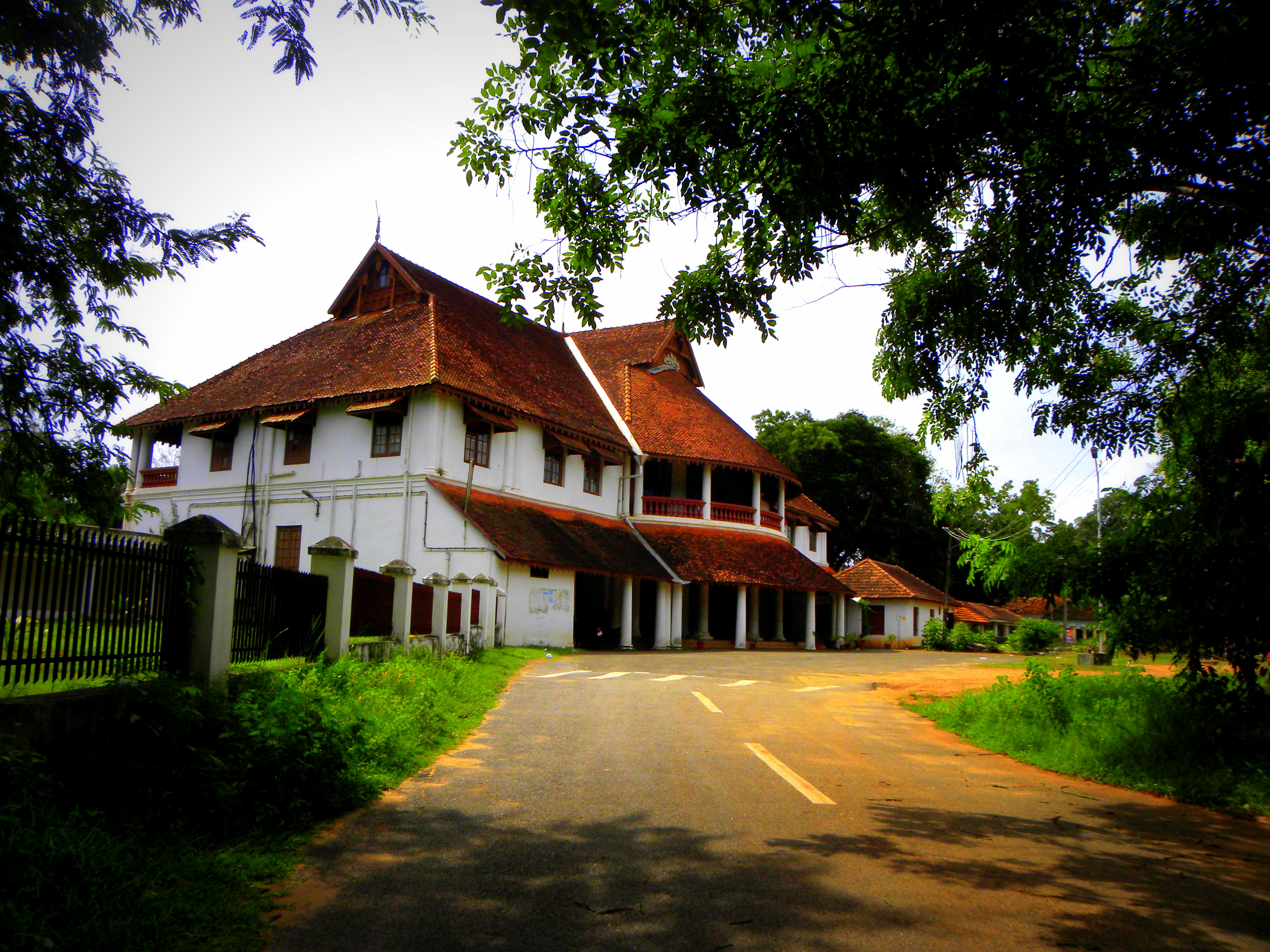
British Residency in Asramam, Kollam.

The Kerala Government has decided to develop the City of Kollam as a "Port City of Kerala". Regeneration of the Maruthadi-Eravipuram area, including construction of facilities for fishing, tourism, and entertainment projects will be implemented as part of the project.

== Economy ==
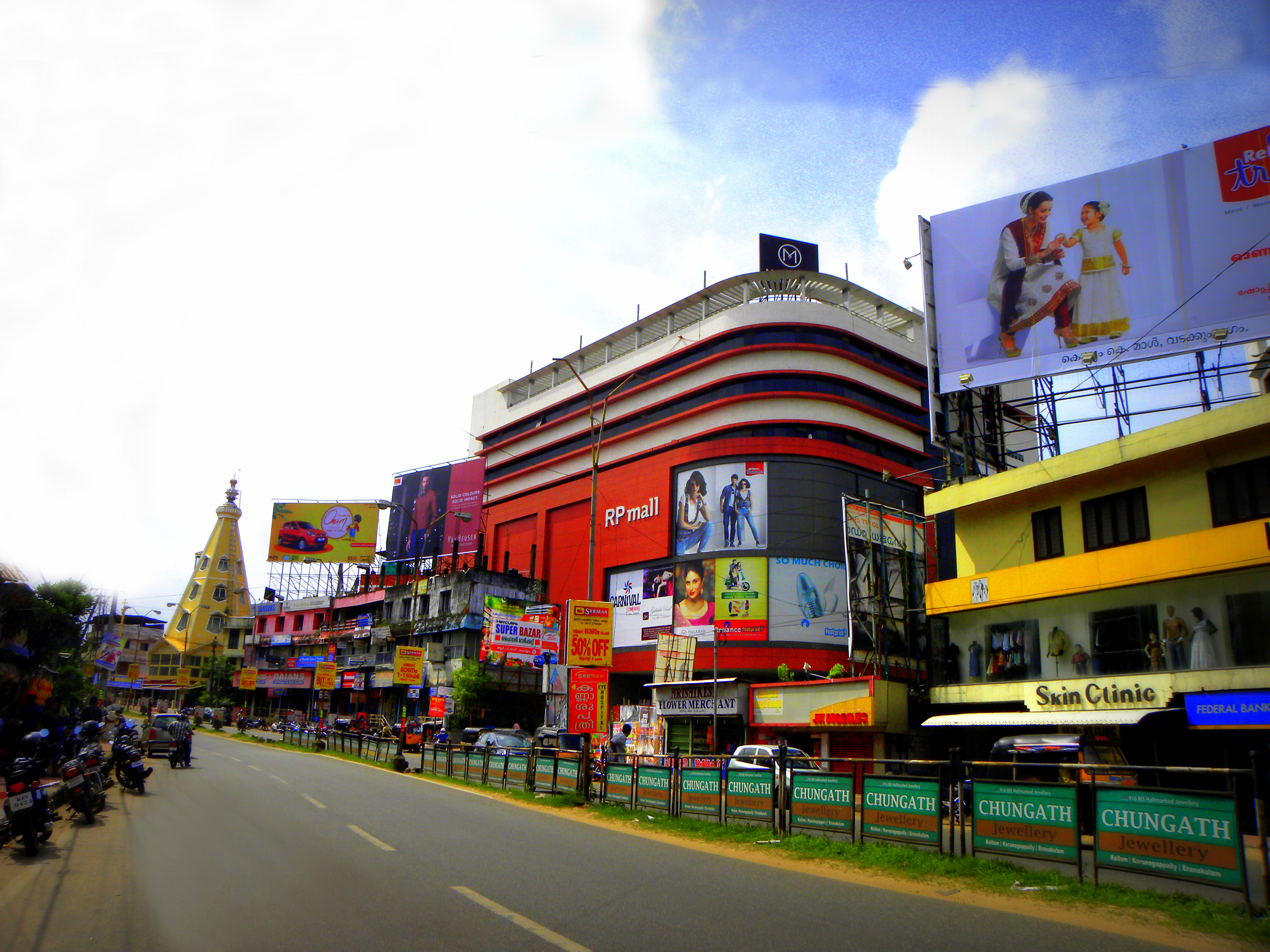
RP Mall, Kollam

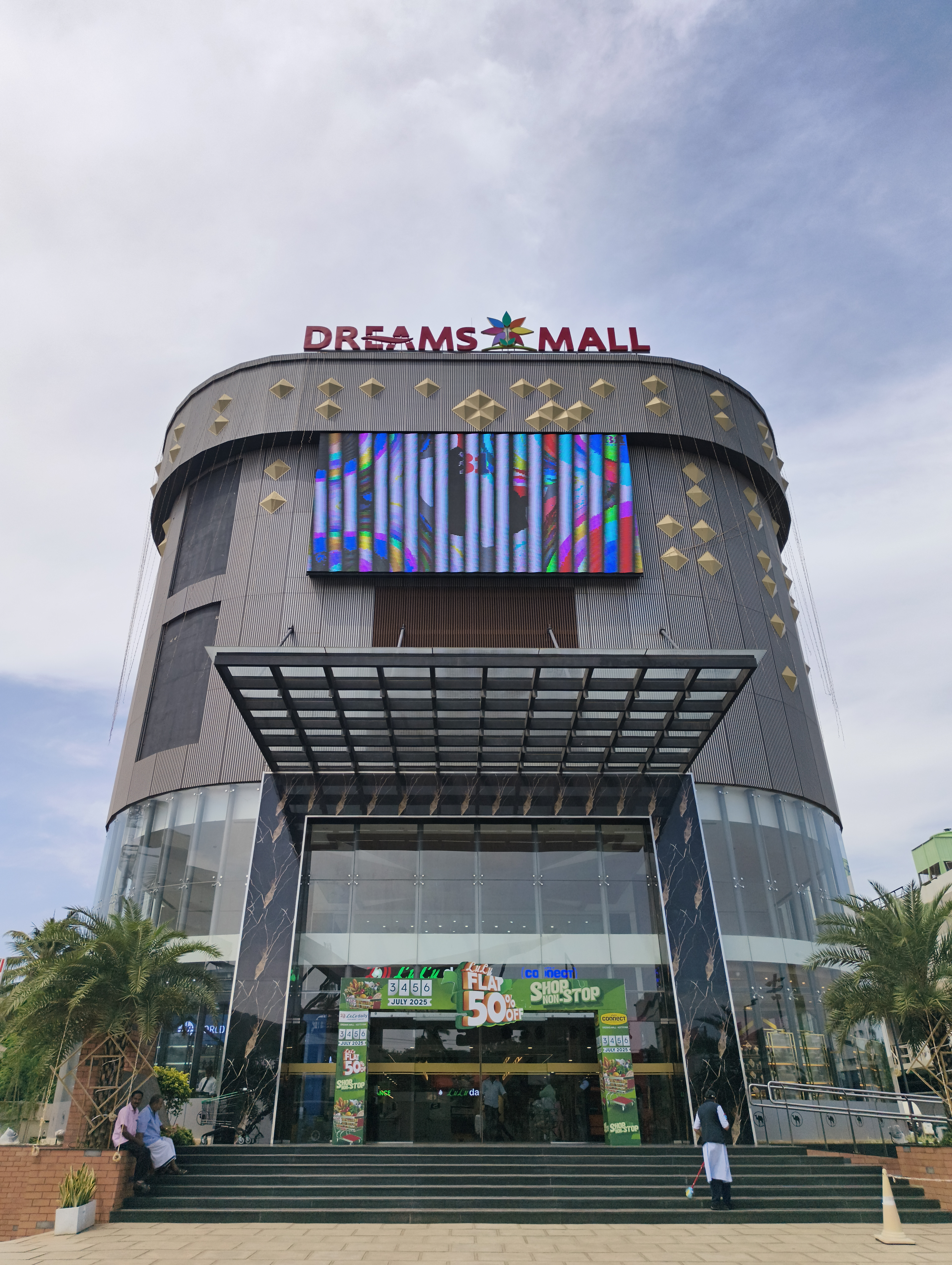
Dreams Mall (Lulu Hyper Market), Kottiyam in Kollam District

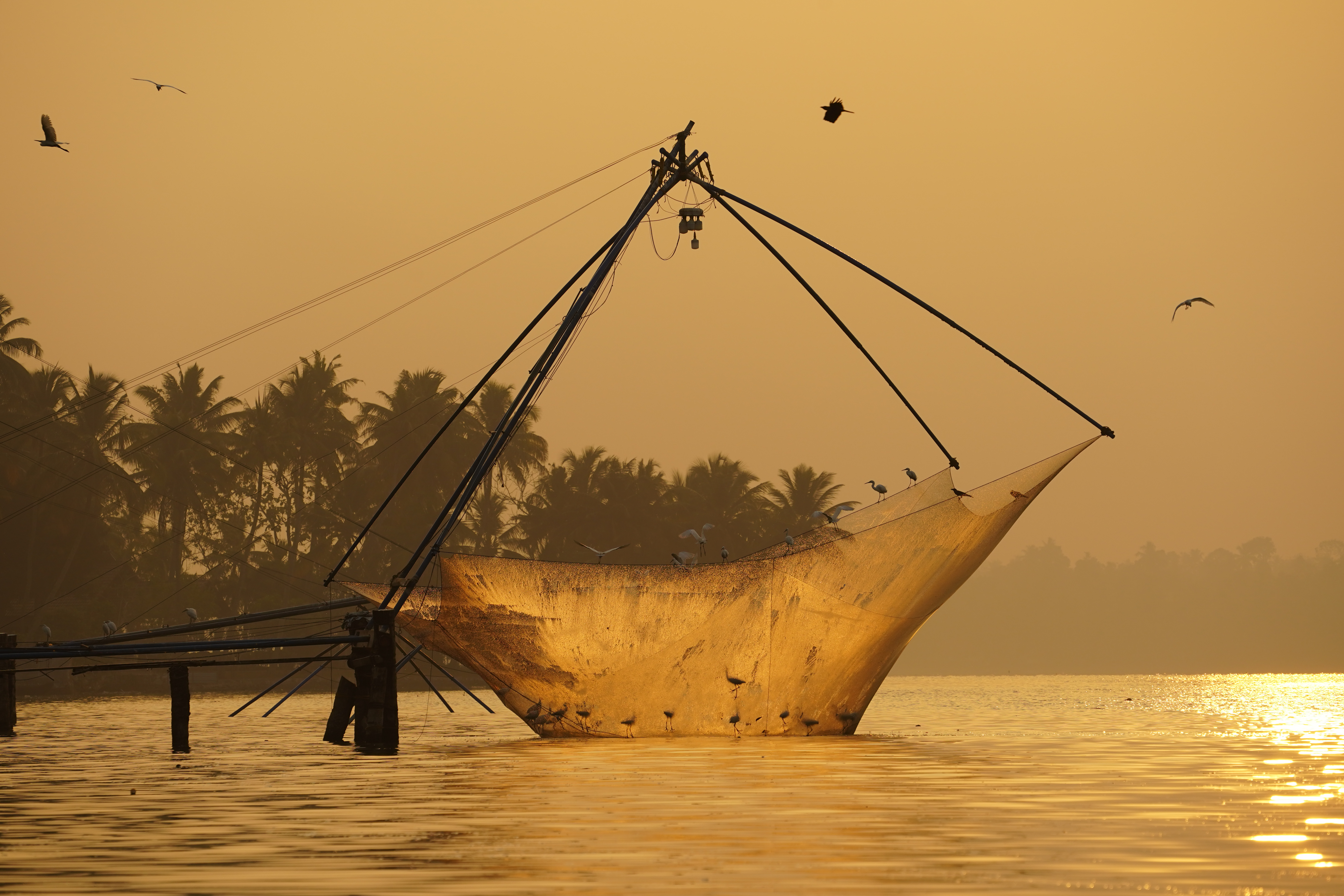
A large Chinese fishing net at Ashtamudi Lake in Kollam city

The city life of Kollam has changed in the last decade. In terms of economic performance and per capita income, Kollam city is in fifth position in India and third in Kerala. Kollam is famous as a city with an excellent export background.

Dairy farming is fairly well developed. There is also a chilling plant in the city. Kollam is an important maritime and port city. Fishing has a place in the district economy. Neendakara and Sakthikulangara villages in the suburbs of the city have fisheries. An estimated 134,973 persons are engaged in fishing and allied activities. Cheriazheekkal, Alappad, Pandarathuruthu, Puthenthura, Neendakara, Thangasseri, Eravipuram and Paravur are eight of the 26 important fishing villages. There are 24 inland fishing villages. The Government has initiated steps for establishing a fishing harbour at Neendakara. The average fish landing is estimated at 85,275 tonnes per year. One-third of the state's fish catch is from Kollam. Nearly 3000 mechanised boats are operating from the fishing harbour. FFDA and VFFDA promote freshwater fish culture and prawn farming, respectively. A fishing village with 100 houses is being built at Eravipuram. A prawn farm is being built at Ayiramthengu, and several new hatcheries are planned to cater to the needs of the aquaculturists. Kerala's only turkey farm and a regional poultry farm are at Kureepuzha.

There are two Central Government industrial operations in the city, the Indian Rare Earths, Chavara and Parvathi Mills Ltd., Kollam. Kerala Ceramics Ltd. in Kundara, Kerala Electrical and Allied Engineering Company in Kundara, Kerala Premo Pipe factory in Chavara, Kerala Minerals and Metals Limited in Chavara and United Electrical Industries in Kollam are Kerala Government-owned companies. Other major industries in the private/cooperative sector are Aluminium Industries Ltd. in Kundara, Thomas Stephen & Co. in Kollam, Floorco in Paravur and Cooperative Spinning Mill in Chathannoor.

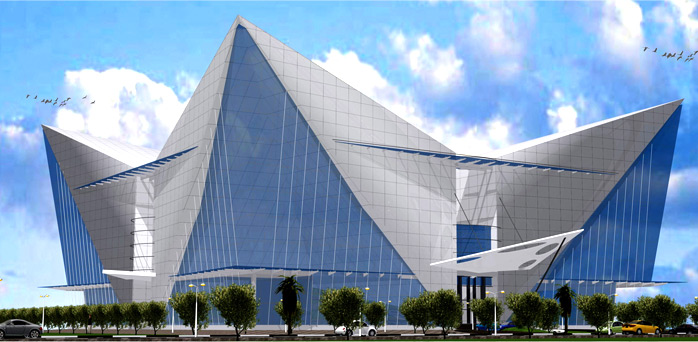
Technopark Kollam

Besides large deposits of China clay in Kundara, Mulavana, and Chathannoor, there are also lime-shell deposits in Ashtamudi Lake and Bauxite deposits in Adichanallur.

Known as the "Cashew Capital of the World", Kollam is noted for its traditional cashew business and is home to more than 600 cashew-processing units. Every year, about 800,000 tonnes of raw cashews are imported into the city for processing and an average of 130,000 tonnes of processed cashews are exported to various countries worldwide. The Cashew Export Promotion Council of India (CEPCI) expects a rise in exports to 275,000 tonnes by 2020, an increase of 120 per cent over the current figure. The Kerala State Cashew Development Corporation Limited (KSCDC) is situated at Mundakkal in Kollam city. The company owns 30 cashew factories all across Kerala. Of these, 24 are located in Kollam district.

Kollam is one of the many seafood export hubs in India with numerous companies involved in the sector. Most of these are based in the Maruthadi, Sakthikulangara, Kavanad, Neendakara, Asramam, Kilikollur, Thirumullavaram and Uliyakovil areas of the city. Capithans, Kings Marine Exporters, India Food Exports and Oceanic Fisheries are examples of seafood exporters.

Kollam's Ashtamudi Lake clam fishery was the first Marine Stewardship Council (MSC) certified fishery in India.

== Culture ==
Kollam Fest is Kollam's own annual festival, attracting mostly Keralites but also hundreds of domestic and foreign tourists to Kollam. The main venue of Kollam Fest is the historic and gigantic Ashramam Maidan. Kollam Fest is the signature event of Kollam. It seeks to showcase Kollam's rich culture and heritage, tourism potential, and investments in new ventures.

Kollam Pooram, part of the Asramam Sree Krishna Swamy Temple Festival, is usually held on 15 April, but occasionally on 16 April. The pooram is held at the Ashramam maidan.

The President's Trophy Boat Race (PTBR) is an annual regatta held in Ashtamudi Lake in Kollam. The event was inaugurated by President Pratibha Patil in September 2011.

== Transport ==
=== Road ===
The state-owned Kerala State Road Transport Corporation (KSRTC) and private bus operators run inter-state and intrastate bus services connecting Kollam. There are mainly 3 bus stations in the city - Kollam KSRTC bus station, Andamukkam city bus station, and Tangasseri Bus Terminal.

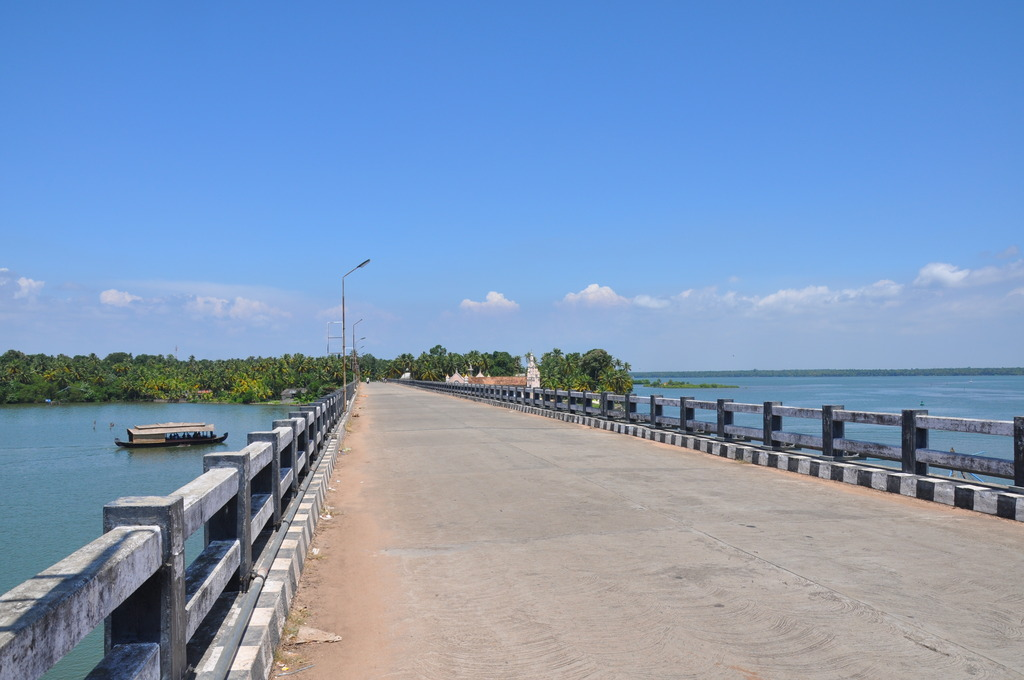
Chavara Thekkumbhagom bridge near Kollam City - This bridge had given a new way of connectivity for the people of Thekkumbhagom with Kollam City along with the existing boat services.

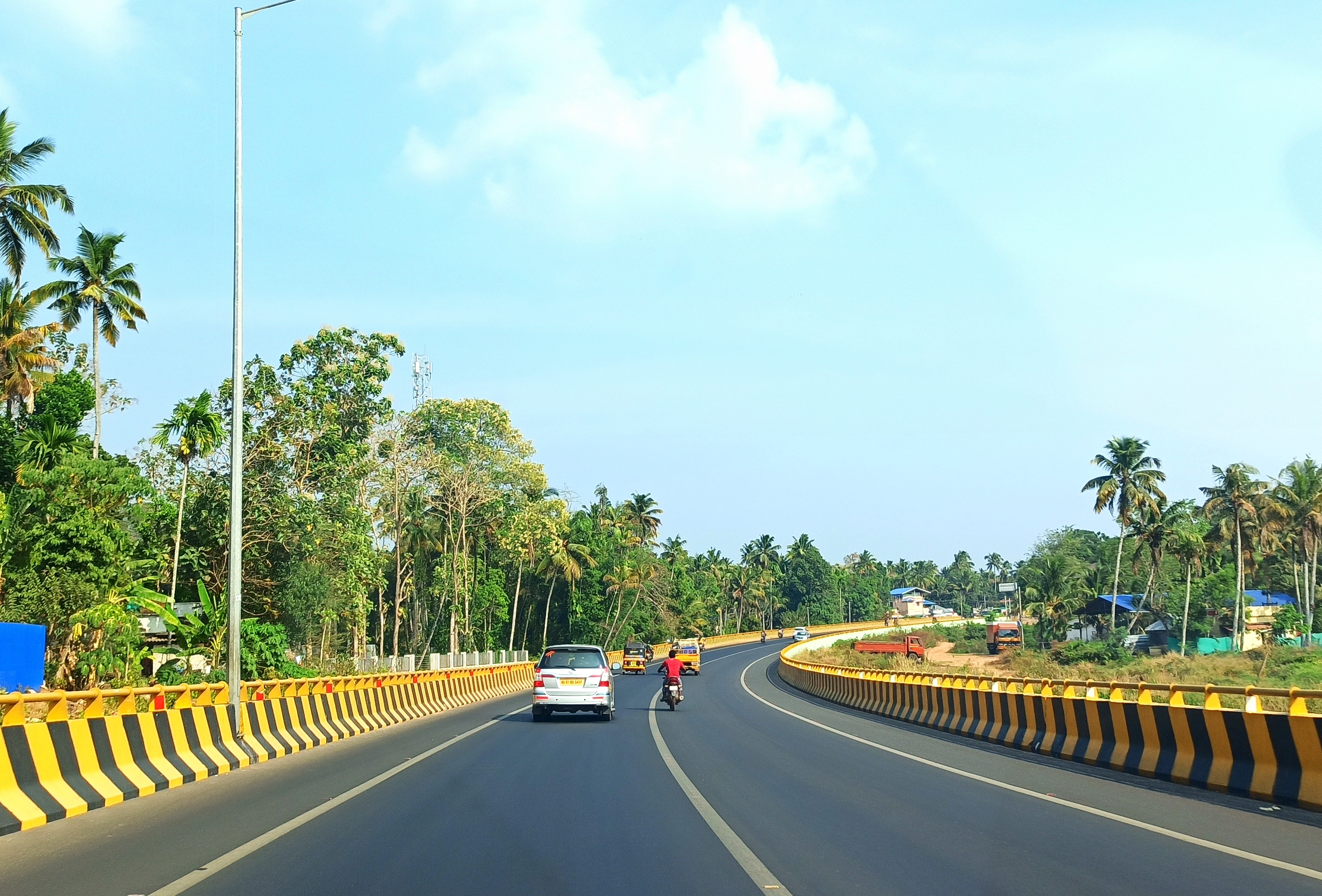
Kollam Bypass - The 13.141 km (8.165 mi) long Kollam Bypass project was actually planned in 1975 but work was delayed due to political and financial issues.

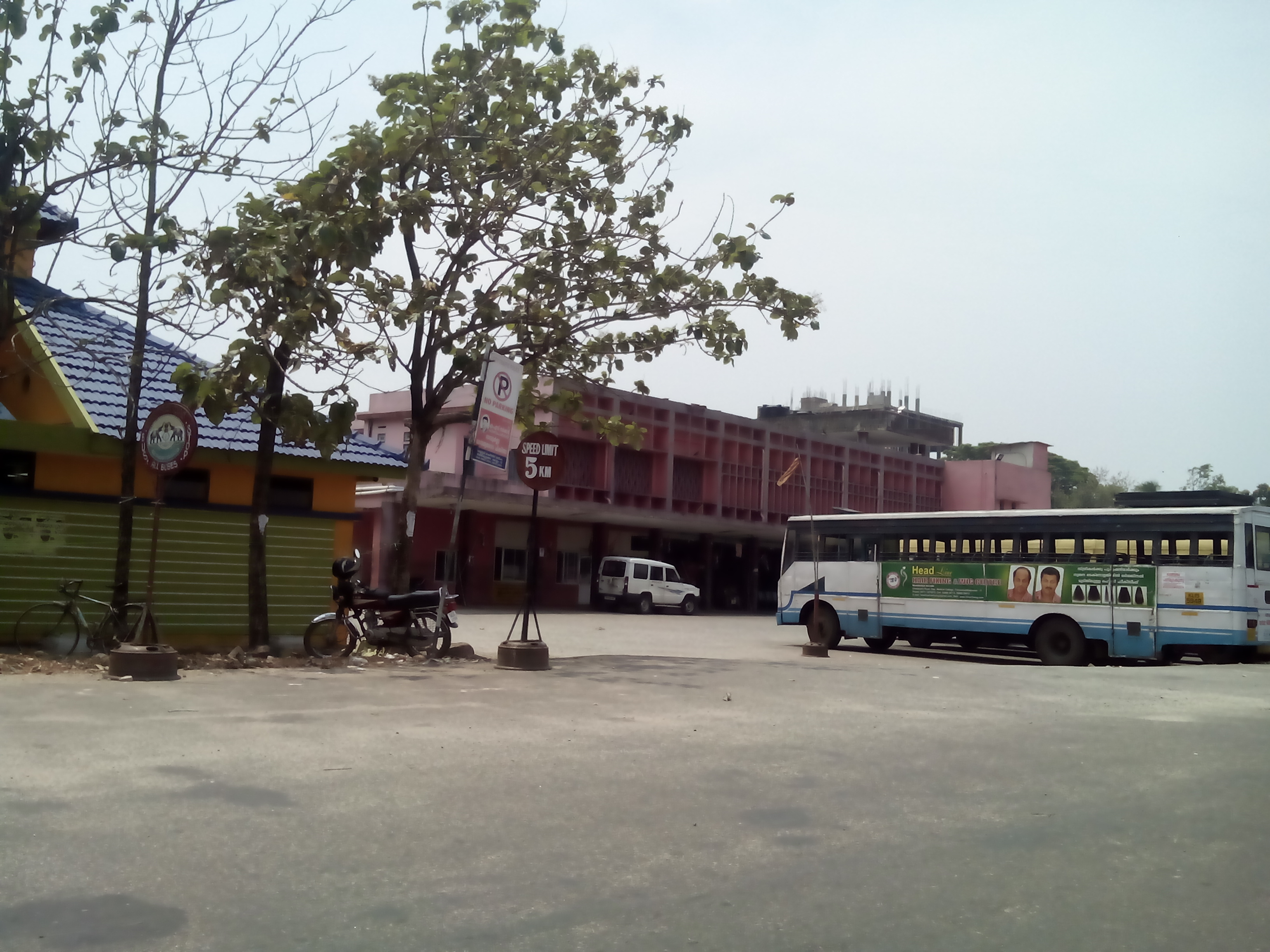
Kollam KSRTC Bus Station is situated at the banks of famous Ashtamudi Lake. One of the main bus stations in the state, it is still waiting to get a makeover.

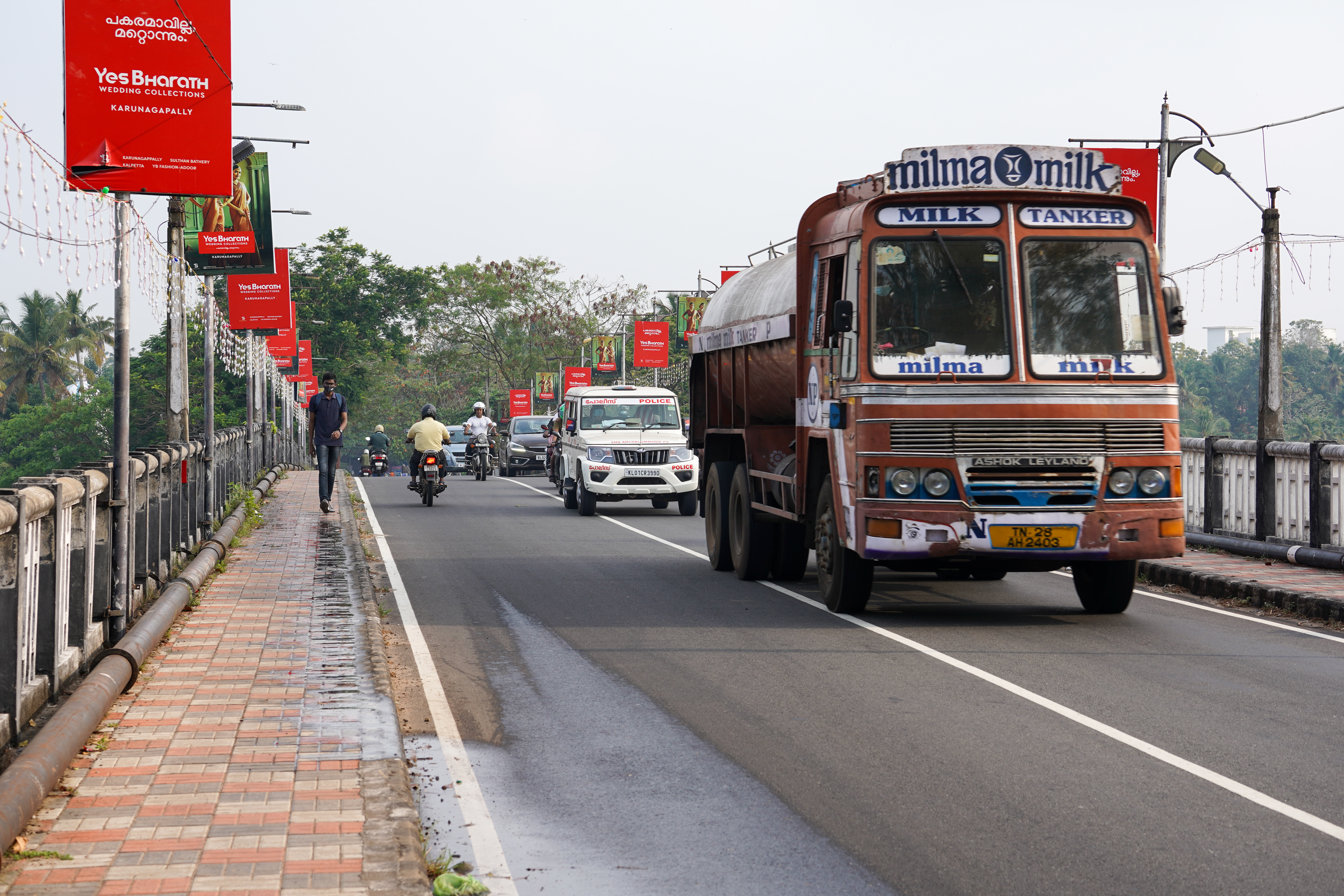
Traffic on the Thevally Bridge connecting Thevally to Kottayathukadavu, over National Waterway 3, Ashtamudi Lake

=== Rail ===
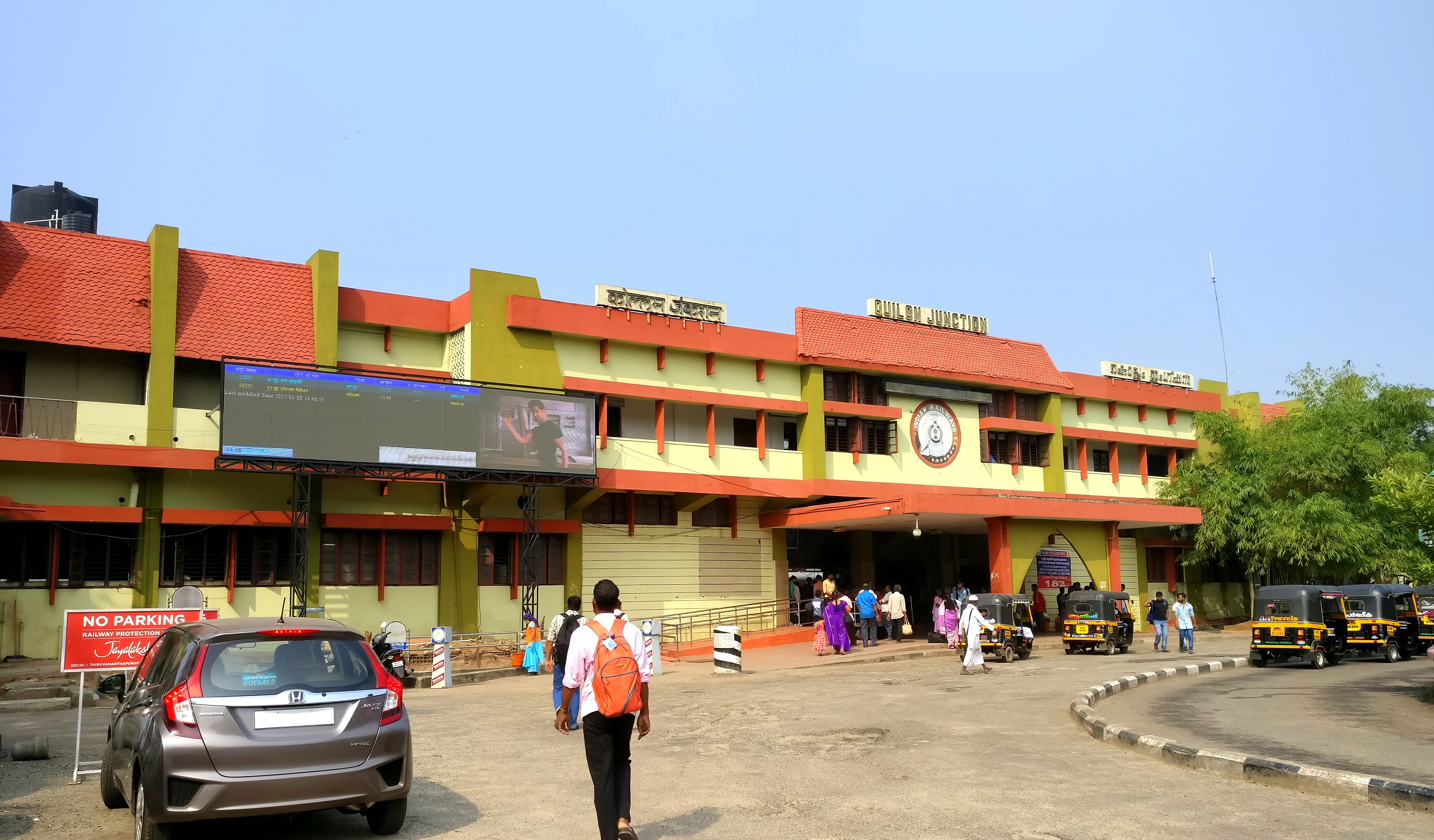
Main terminal of Kollam Junction railway station

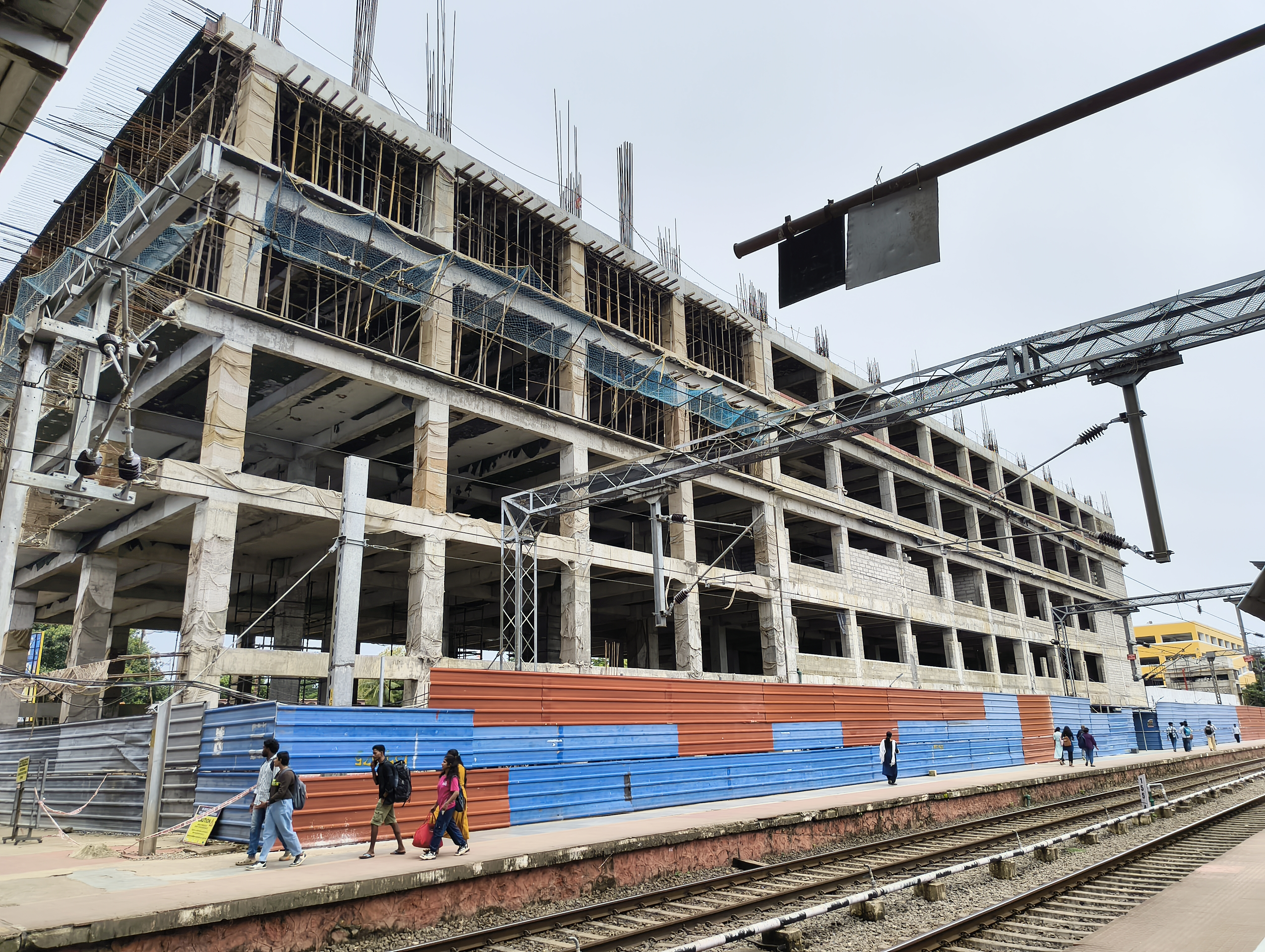
Kollam Railway Under Construction

Kollam Junction is the second-largest railway station in Kerala in terms of area, with a total of 6 platforms and 17 rail tracks. Other railway stations in Kollam city are Eravipuram and Kilikollur. Kollam Junction has the world's third-longest railway platform, measuring 1180.5 metres (3873 ft).

Railway stations in Kollam
No.	Station name	Platforms	Area
1	Eravipuram	2	South Kollam
2	Kollam Junction	6	Central Kollam
3	Kilikollur	2	East Kollam

Mainline Electrical Multiple Unit (MEMU) has a car maintenance shed at Kollam Junction. The MEMU train service connects Kollam with Ernakulam (via Alappuzha and Kottayam), Punalur (via Kottarakkara), and Kanniyakumari (via Thiruvananthapuram).

=== Water ===
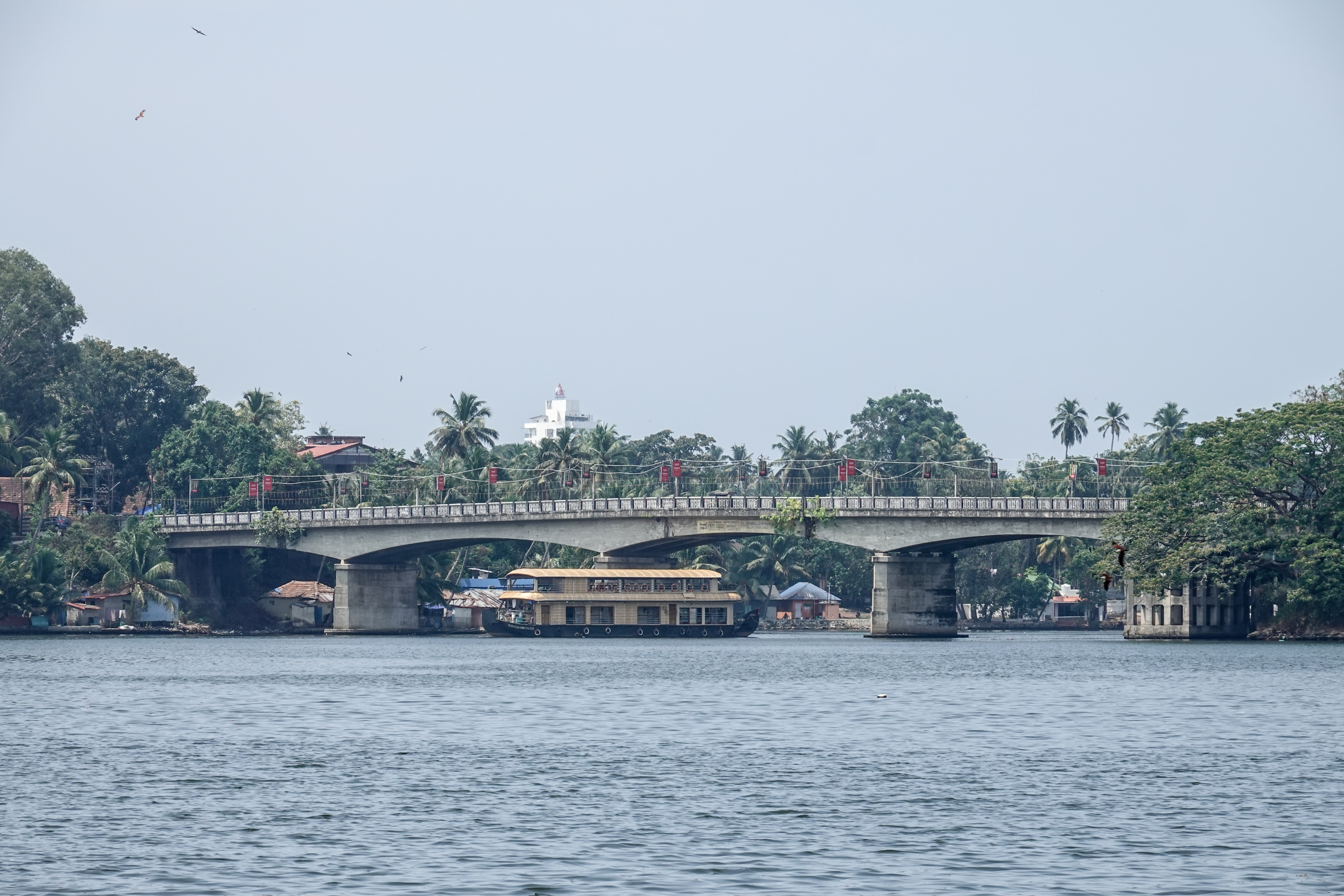
Houseboat passing under Thevally Bridge

The State Water Transport Department operates boat services to West Kallada, Munroe Island, Guhanandapuram, Chavara Thekkumbhagom, Dalavapuram, and Alappuzha from Kollam KSWTD Ferry Terminal, which is situated on the banks of the Ashtamudi Lake. The lake is the second-largest wetland ecosystem in Kerala and is a central hub for water transport in Kollam. Its waters connect the city with a number of local communities and form part of National Waterway 3. Kollam Thodu is a 7.7-kilometer canal that runs through the city and serves as a vital artery of the water transport network. It connects Ashtamudi Lake with other water bodies and links the main Kollam Port to the Inland Waterways Authority of India (IWAI) inland terminal. Following renovation efforts, the canal is intended to support both passenger and cargo transport, as well as tourism.

Asramam Link Road in the city passes adjacent to the ferry terminal.

The services from Kollam are broadly categorised into long-distance ferry services, short-distance commuter ferries, and special tourist cruises.

- Kollam-Alappuzha (Alleppey) Cruise: This is a flagship service, an 8-hour scenic cruise covering approximately 55 kilometres through Ashtamudi Lake and the interconnected backwater canals. It serves both as a direct transport link between the two districts and as a major tourist product.
- Commuter and Short-Route Services: Regular, low-fare ferry services connect Kollam to various points within the district, including routes to Alumkadavu, Guhanandapuram, and Kannanalloor. These function as essential public transport for local residents.
- Tourist and Special Services: "See Ashtamudi" tourist service: A 5-hour pleasure trip on Ashtamudi Lake, with a stop at Sambranikkodi Island. It departs daily at 11:30 a.m. and costs ₹400 for the lower deck and ₹500 for the upper deck. Many private tour operators and resorts offer day cruises on the Ashtamudi Lake for tourists, allowing for exploration of the area in houseboats, motorboats, and canoes.

Double-decker luxury boats run between Kollam and Allepey daily. Luxury boats, operated by the government and private owners, run from the main boat jetty during the tourist season. The West Coast canal system, which starts from Thiruvananthapuram in the south and ends at Hosdurg in the north, passes through Paravur, the city of Kollam, and Karunagappally taluk.

Kollam Port is one of the major ports in Kerala. Cargo handling facilities began operation in 2013. Foreign ships arrive in the port regularly, with the MV Alina, a 145-metre (476 ft) vessel registered in Antigua, anchored at the port on 4 April 2014. Once the port starts functioning fully, it will make the transportation activities of Kollam-based cashew companies easier. Shreyas Shipping Company is now running a regular container service between Kollam Port and Kochi Port.

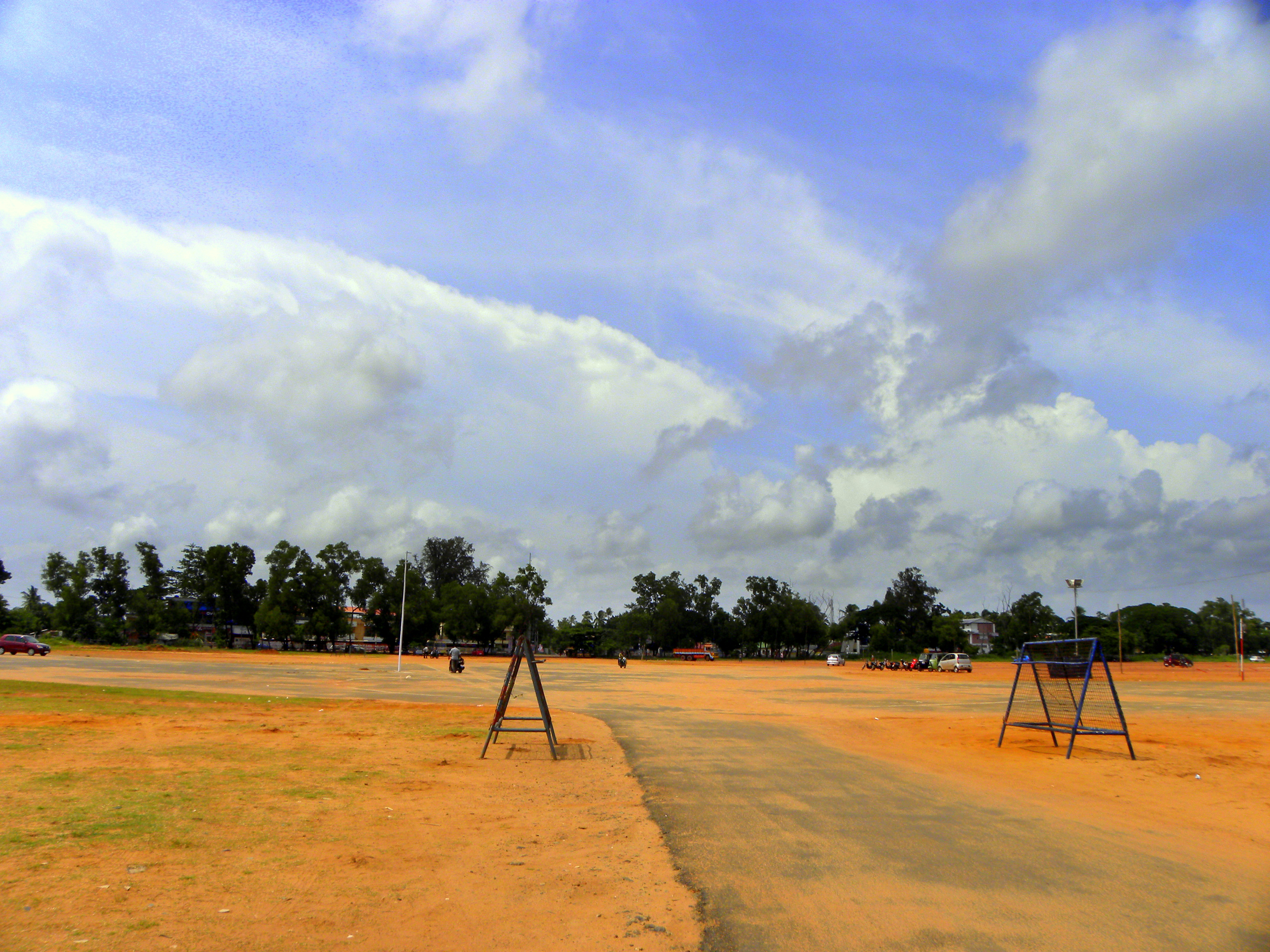
Old Kollam Airport area, Asramam

The Kollam Canal (also known as the Quilon Canal or Kollam Thodu), a key part of the larger West Coast Canal system, was constructed in 1880. It became the primary trade channel for the former princely state of Travancore, with cargo vessels ferrying goods through the city.

==== Future projects ====
To further leverage its water transport infrastructure, Kollam has several ongoing and proposed projects:

Kollam Water Metro
There are plans to introduce a Water Metro system in Kollam, which would provide an intra-city water transport network similar to the one in Kochi.
Waterway development
Projects are underway to develop and maintain National Waterway 3 to support 24-hour navigation, including deepening channels and improving terminals.

=== Air ===
The city corporation of Kollam is served by the Thiruvananthapuram International Airport, which is about 56 kilometres from the city via NH66. Trivandrum International Airport is the first international airport in a non-metro city in India.

== Education ==
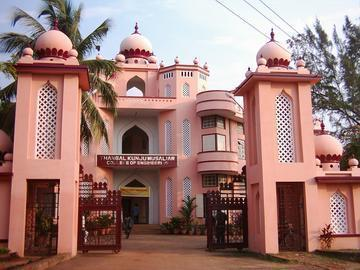
TKM Engineering College in Karicode

There are many colleges, schools and learning centres in Kollam. Thangal Kunju Musaliar College of Engineering, the first private school of its kind in the state, is at Kilikollur, about 7 km (4.3 mi) east of Kollam city, and is a source of pride for all Kollamites. The Government of Kerala has granted academic autonomy to Fatima Mata National College, another prestigious institution in the city.

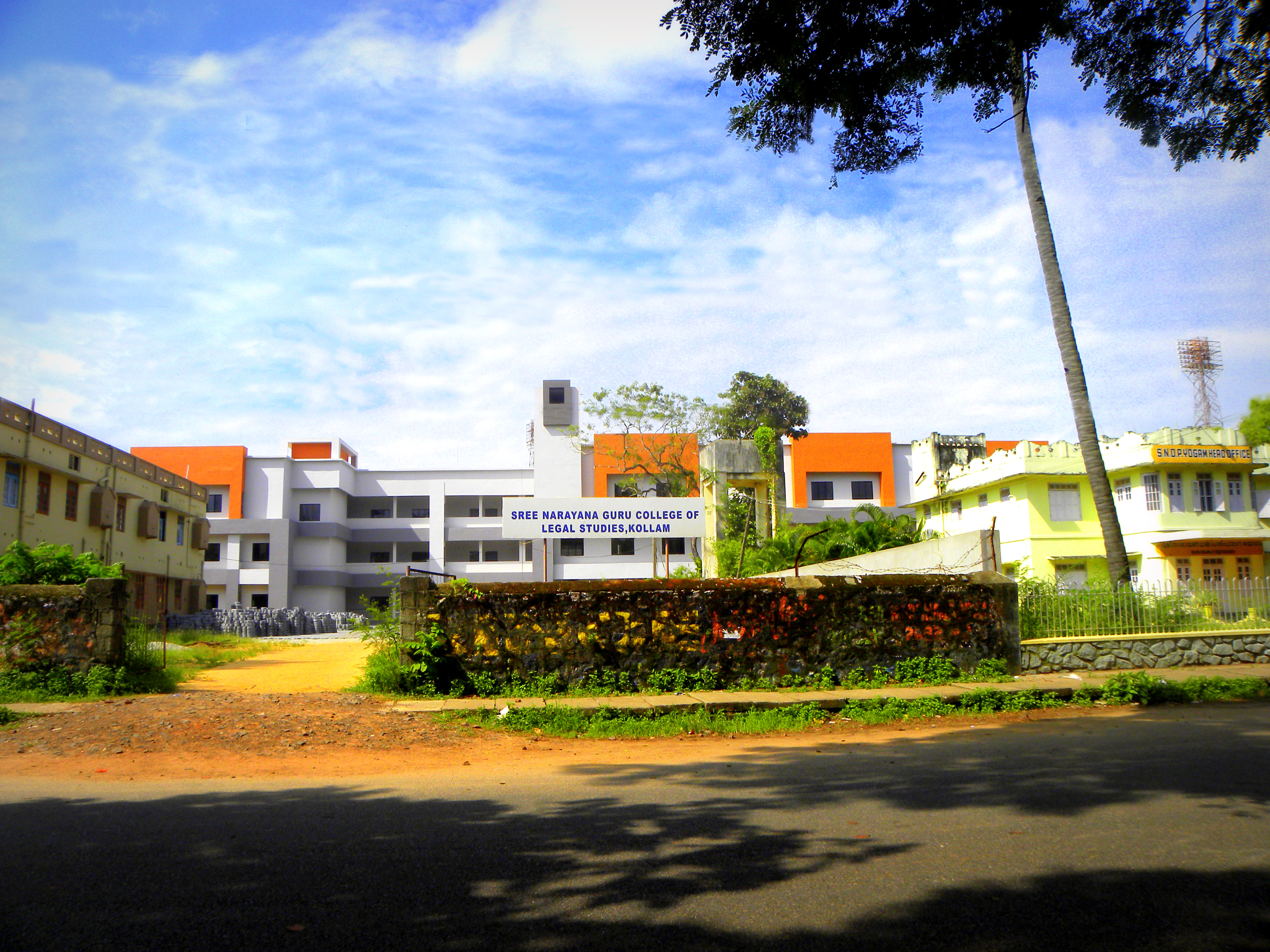
Sree Narayana Guru College of Legal Studies in Karbala

Kerala State Institute of Design (KSID), a design institute under the Department of Labour and Skills, Government of Kerala, is located at Chandanathope in Kollam. It was established in 2008 and was one of the first state-owned design institutes in India. KSID currently conducts Post Graduate Diploma Programs in Design developed in association with the National Institute of Design, Ahmedabad.

Indian Institute of Infrastructure and Construction (IIIC-Kollam) is an institute of international standards situated at Chavara in Kollam City to support the skill development programmes for construction-related occupations. The Institute of Fashion Technology, Kollam, Kerala is a fashion technology institute situated at Vellimon, established in technical collaboration with the National Institute of Fashion Technology and the Ministry of Textiles. In addition, there are two IMK (Institute of Management, Kerala) Extension Centres active in the city. Kerala Maritime Institute is situated at Neendakara in Kollam city to give maritime training for the students in Kerala. More than 5,000 students have been trained at the Neendakara Maritime Institute under the Boat Crew training programme.

Apart from colleges, there are a number of bank coaching centres in Kollam. Kollam is known as India's hub for bank test coaching centres, with around 40 such institutes in the district.

== Sports ==
Football is the most popular sport, followed by boxing and hockey. Kollam is home to a number of local football, hockey, and cricket teams participating in district, state, and zone-level matches. An International Hockey Stadium with astro-turf facility is situated at Asramam in the city. It was built at a cost of Rs. 13 crore. The land for the construction of the stadium was taken over from the Postal Department at Asramam, Kollam. The city has another stadium named the Lal Bahadur Shastri Stadium, Kollam. It is a multipurpose stadium and has repeatedly hosted such sports events as the Ranji Trophy, Santhosh Trophy, and National Games. Two open grounds in the city, the Asramam Maidan and Peeranki Maidan, are also used for sports events, practice and warm-up matches.

== Tourist places ==
=== Hindu temples ===
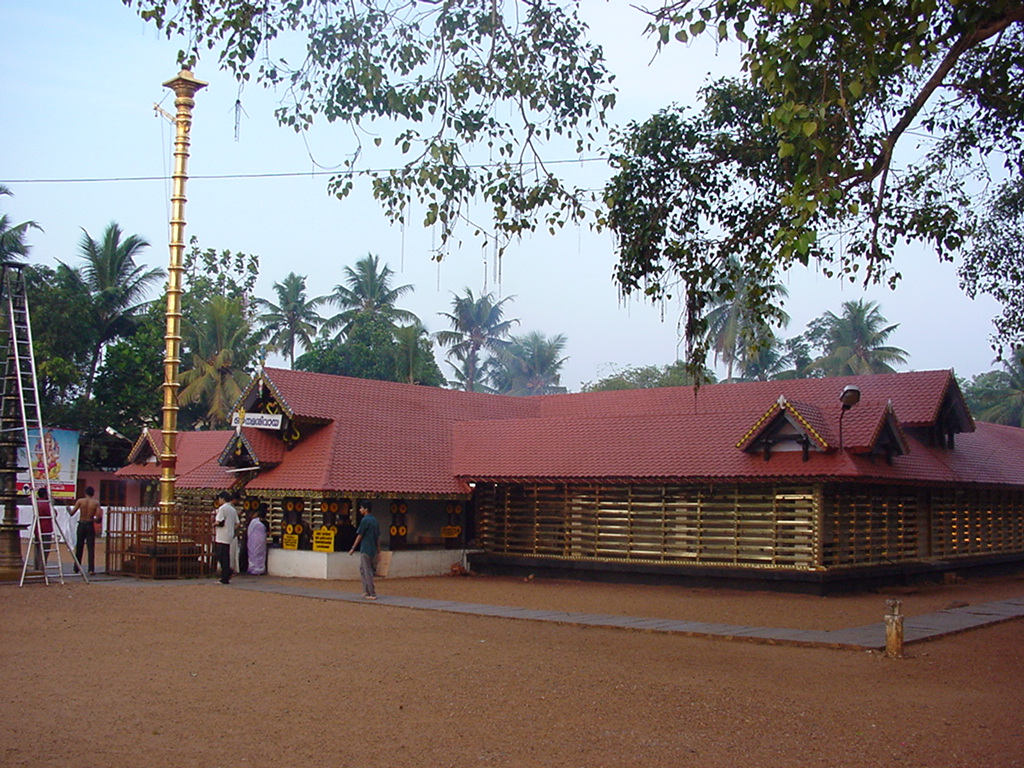
Kottarakkara Sree Mahaganapathi Kshethram

- Anandavalleeshwaram Sri Mahadevar Temple is a 400 years old ancient Hindu temple in the city. The 400-year-old Sanctum sanctorum of this temple is finished in teak.
- Ammachiveedu Murti Temple is another major temple in the city that was founded around 600 years ago by the Ammachi Veedu family, aristocrats from Kollam.
- The Kollam pooram, a major festival of Kollam, is the culmination of a ten-day festival, normally in mid April, of Asramam Sree Krishna Swamy Temple.
- Kottankulangara Devi Temple is one of the world-famous Hindu temples in Kerala were cross-dressing of men for Chamayavilakku ritual is a part of traditional festivities. The men also carry large lamps. The first of the two-day dressing event drew to a close early on Monday.
- Other famous Hindu worship centres in the Kollam Metropolitan Area are, Kottarakkara Sree Mahaganapathi Kshethram in Kottarakkara, Puttingal Devi Temple in Paravur, Sooranad north Anayadi Pazhayidam Sree Narasimha Moorthy Temple, Poruvazhy Peruviruthy Malanada Temple in Poruvazhy, Sasthamcotta Sree Dharma Sastha Temple in Sasthamkotta, Sakthikulangara Sree Dharma Sastha temple, Thrikkadavoor Sree Mahadeva Temple in Kadavoor and Kattil Mekkathil Devi Temple in Ponmana Padanayarkulangara mahadeva temple Karunagappally,

=== Churches ===
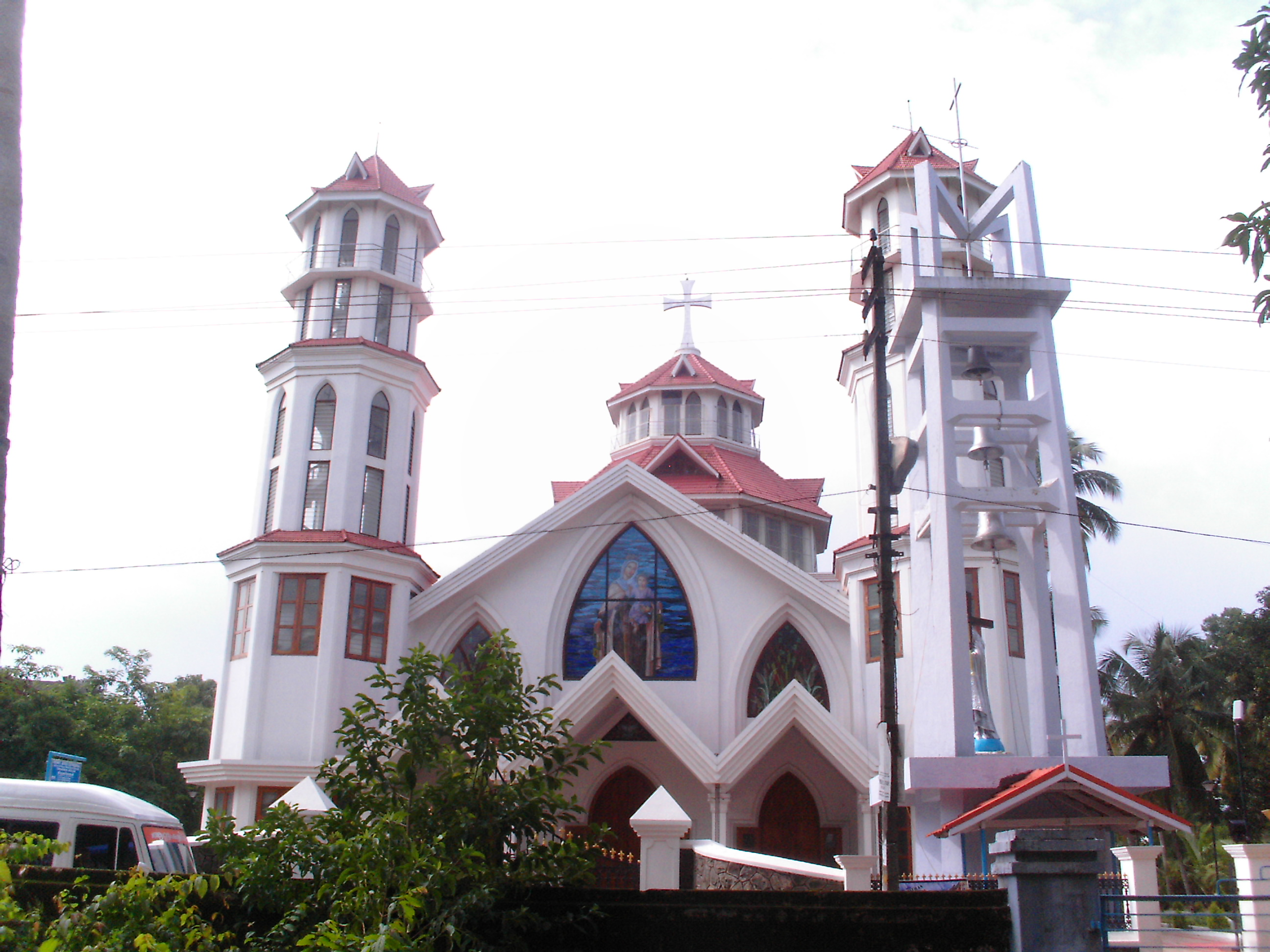
Infant Jesus Cathedral in Tangasseri, Kollam

The Infant Jesus Cathedral in Tangasseri was established by the Portuguese in 1614. It is now the pro-cathedral of the Roman Catholic Diocese of Quilon – the ancient and first Catholic diocese of India. The church remains as a memento of the Portuguese rule of old Quilon city. St. Sebastian's Church at Neendakara is another important church. The Dutch Church in Munroe Island was built by the Dutch in 1878. Our Lady of Velankanni Shrine in Cutchery is another important Christian worship place in Kollam city. Saint Casimir Church in Kadavoor, Holy Family Church in Kavanad, St.Stephen's Church in Thoppu and St.Thomas Church in Kadappakada are some of the other major Christian churches in Kollam.

=== Mosques ===
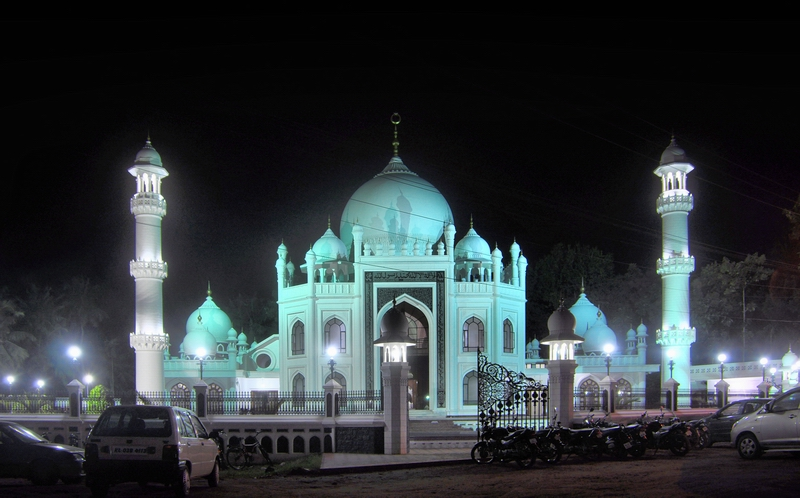
Karunagappally Mosque

Kottukadu Juma Masjid in Chavara, Elampalloor Juma-A-Masjid, Valiyapalli in Jonakappuram, Chinnakada Juma Masjid, Juma-'Ath Palli in Kollurvila, Juma-'Ath Palli in Thattamala and Koivila Juma Masjid in Chavara are the other major Mosques in Kollam.

== Notable people ==
- List of people from Kollam

== See also ==
- Downtown Kollam
- Kollam Junction railway station
- Kollam Metropolitan Area
- Kollam District
- Cashew business in Kollam
- Largest Indian cities by GDP

== Bibliography ==
- Ring, Trudy (1994). International Dictionary of Historic Places: Asia and Oceania, Volume 5. United Kingdom: Taylor & Francis. ISBN 978-1-884964-05-3.
- Chan, Hok-lam (1998). "The Chien-wen, Yung-lo, Hung-hsi, and Hsüan-te reigns, 1399–1435". The Cambridge History of China, Volume 7: The Ming Dynasty, 1368–1644, Part 1. Cambridge: Cambridge University Press. ISBN 978-0-521-24332-2.
- Lin (2007). Zheng He's Voyages Down the Western Seas. Fujian Province: China Intercontinental Press. ISBN 978-7-5085-0707-1.
- Elamkulam Kunjan Pillai, Keralathinde Eruladanja Edukal, p. 64,112,117
- Travancore Archaeological Series (T.A.S.) Vol. 6 p. 15
- Diaries and writings of Mathai Kathanar, the 24th generation priest of Thulaserry Manapurathu, based on the ancestral documents and Thaliyolagrandha handed down through generations
- Z.M. Paret, Malankara Nazranikal, vol. 1
- L. K. Ananthakrishna Iyer, State Manual, p50,52
- Bernard Thoma Kathanar, Marthoma Christyanikal, lines 23,24
- Malekandathil, Pius (2010). Maritime India: Trade, Religion and Polity in the Indian Ocean. Primus Books. p. 43. ISBN 978-93-80607-01-6.
- Narayan, M.G.S, Chera-Pandya conflict in the 8th–9th centuries which led to the birth of Venadu: Pandyan History seminar, Madurai University, 1971
- The Viswavijnanakosam (Malayalam) Vol. 3, p. 523,534
- Narayan M.G.S., Cultural Symbiosis p33
- The handwritten diaries of Pulikottil Mar Dionyius (former supreme head of the Malankara Orthodox Syrian Church and Chitramezhuthu KM Varghese)
