= Kollam Pooram =

Indian festival

- Official name: Kollam Pooram
- Type: Temple Festival
- Observances: Temple Festival, Kuda Matam, elephant show
- Date: Next Day of Vishu
- Duration: 10 days
- Frequency: Annual

Kollam Pooram (Malayalam: കൊല്ലം പൂരം) is a ten-day festival held every year in April in Kollam City in the Indian state of Kerala. The festival attracts a large number of people from all parts of the state and is organised in connection with the annual festival of the Asramam Sree Krishna Swamy Temple at Kollam's Asramam Maidan. The festival has now assumed the status of a national festival attracting tourists in large numbers.

For the kudamattom, thirty elephants are split into two groups of fifteen representing the Thamarakulam Sri Mahaganapathy Temple and the Puthiyakavu Bhagawathy Temple. The kudamattom is held to the beats of a traditional melam. The pooram is followed by a firework display.

== Festival ==
The pooram falls on the day after Vishu, in the Malayalam month of Medam, and forms the conclusion of the Vishu Maholsavam, the ten-day annual festival of the Asramam Sree Krishna Swamy Temple.

On the pooram day, ceremonial processions (pooram ezhunnallathu) from temples in the city arrive at the festival grounds from nine in the morning. Among the temples that take part are the Erattakulangara Sri Mahavishnu, Koyikkal Sree Dharma Sastha, Asramam Muneeshwara Swamy, Thumpara Sree Bhadra Durga Devi, Thamarakkulam Sree Maha Ganapathy and Puthiyakavu Bhagavathy temples. At noon the elephants are bathed and fed in the ana neerattu and anayootu ceremonies. Towards evening the elephant parade moves from the temple precincts to the Asramam Maidan for the kudamattom, in which the two lines of elephants face each other and exchange ornamental parasols.

The kudamattom is accompanied by panchari melam; in recent editions the ensemble has been led by Cheranalloor Sankarankutty Marar and Thrikadavur Akhil. The festival closes with the lowering of the temple flag (kodiyirakkam) and a display of fireworks.

The parasols and effigies displayed at the pooram, including figures of peacocks, deities and dancers, are made by teams of local volunteers in the weeks before the festival. The work has been carried on within single families across generations.

== See also ==
- Kollam
- Thrissur Pooram
- President's Trophy Boat Race
- Kollam Beach
