= Asramam Sree Krishna Swamy Temple =

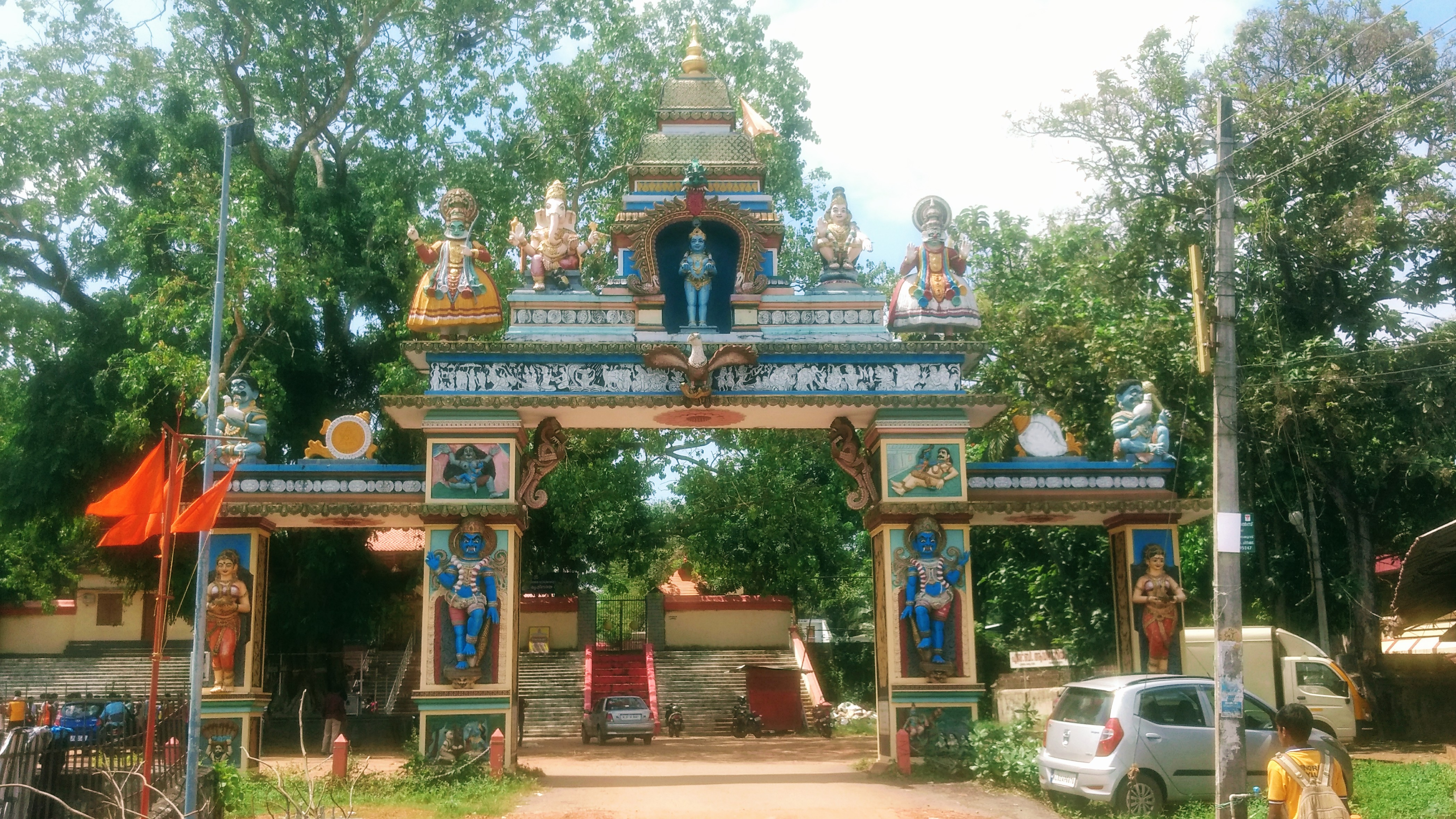
- Front view of the temple

- Sree Krishna Swamy Temple, Asramam, Kollam, Kerala

Religion
- Affiliation: Hinduism
- District: Kollam
- Deity: Sreekrishna
- Festival: Kollam Pooram

Location
- Location: Asramam
- State: Kerala
- Country: India
- Coordinates: 8°54′00.6″N 76°35′07.0″E

Architecture
- Elevation: 29.26 m (96 ft)

Website
- https://kollampooram.com

Asramam Sree Krishna Swamy Temple is a Sreekrishna temple in the district of Kollam, Kerala, South India located on the shores of Ashtamudi Lake. Lord Krishna in the form of Navaneet Krishnan or Krishna with Butter is worshiped here. The temple sits on the top of a mount created by digging earth from a nearby place, which now forms the temple pond.

Sub-deities include Swamy Ayyappan (a separate temple building with the 18 holy steps of Sabarimala present), Naga Devatas and Navagrahas.

Kollam pooram is the culmination of a ten-day festival, normally in mid April, of Ashramam Sreekrishna swamy temple.

== See also ==
- Kollam pooram
