= Tangasseri Breakwater Tourism Park =

Park in Kollam, Kerala

Thangassery Breakwater Tourism Park
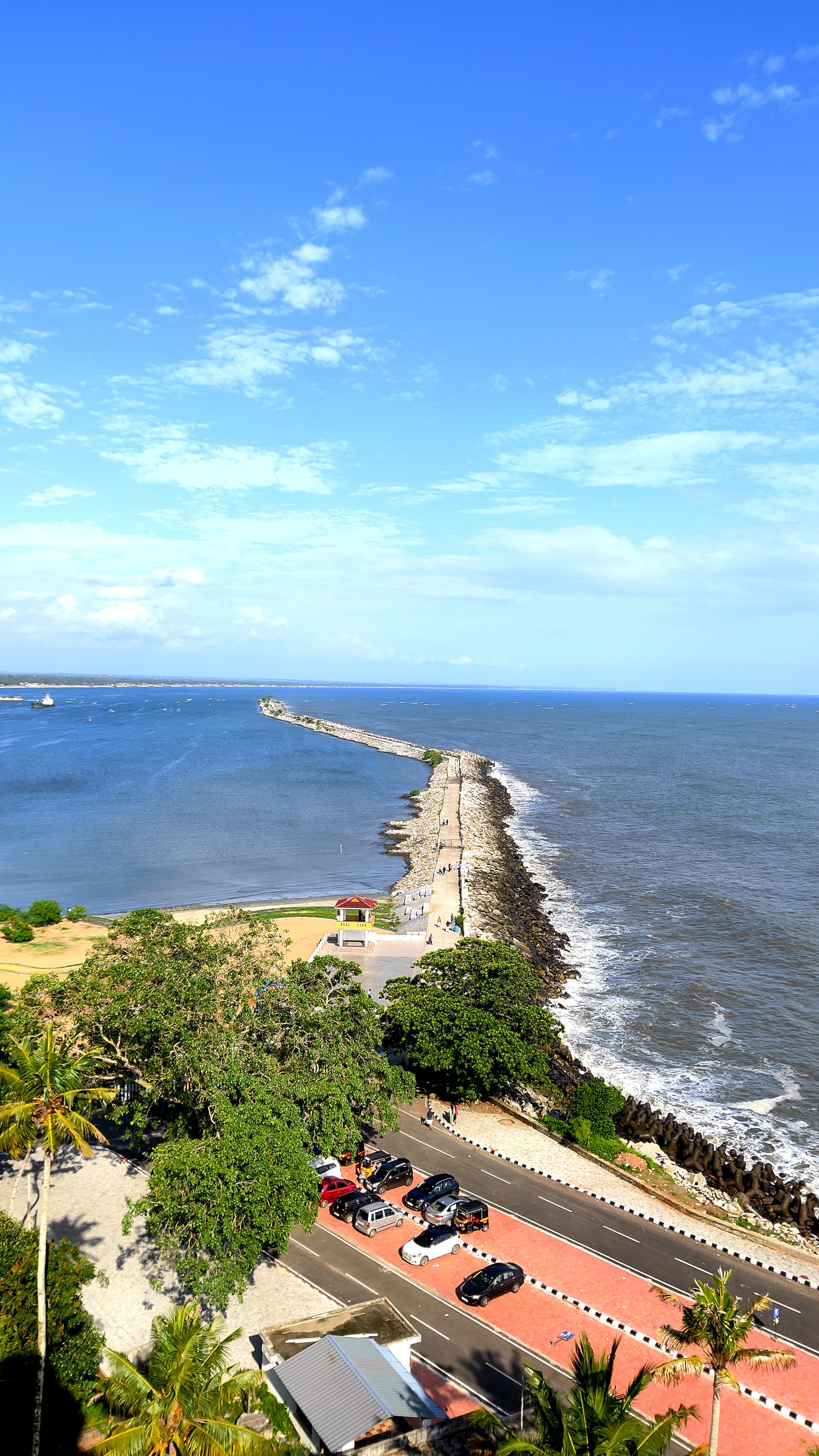

- Location within Kollam Location within Kerala Location within India
- Type: Urban park
- Location: Thangassery in Kollam city, India
- Coordinates: 8°52′50″N 76°34′03″E
- Area: 2.5 acres (1.0 ha)
- Created: 2023
- Owner: Department of Tourism, Harbour Engineering Department
- Operator: DTPC, Kollam
- Status: Open all year

Thangassery Breakwater Tourism Park is a tourist destination in Kollam, Kerala. The park is located on a 2.5-acre plot of land at Thangassery, a coastal town in Kollam district. The park was inaugurated on April 27, 2023, and has been attracting a large number of visitors since then.

The park is a waterfront location with views of the Arabian Sea. It features a variety of amenities, including a children's playground, a boating lake, a food court, and a number of souvenir shops. There is also an open-air auditorium that can accommodate up to 400 people. Thangassery Breakwater Tourism Park project launched by the Department of Tourism for promoting coastal tourism.
