= Port Kollam Church =

Our Lady of Purification Church
- Port Kollam Church
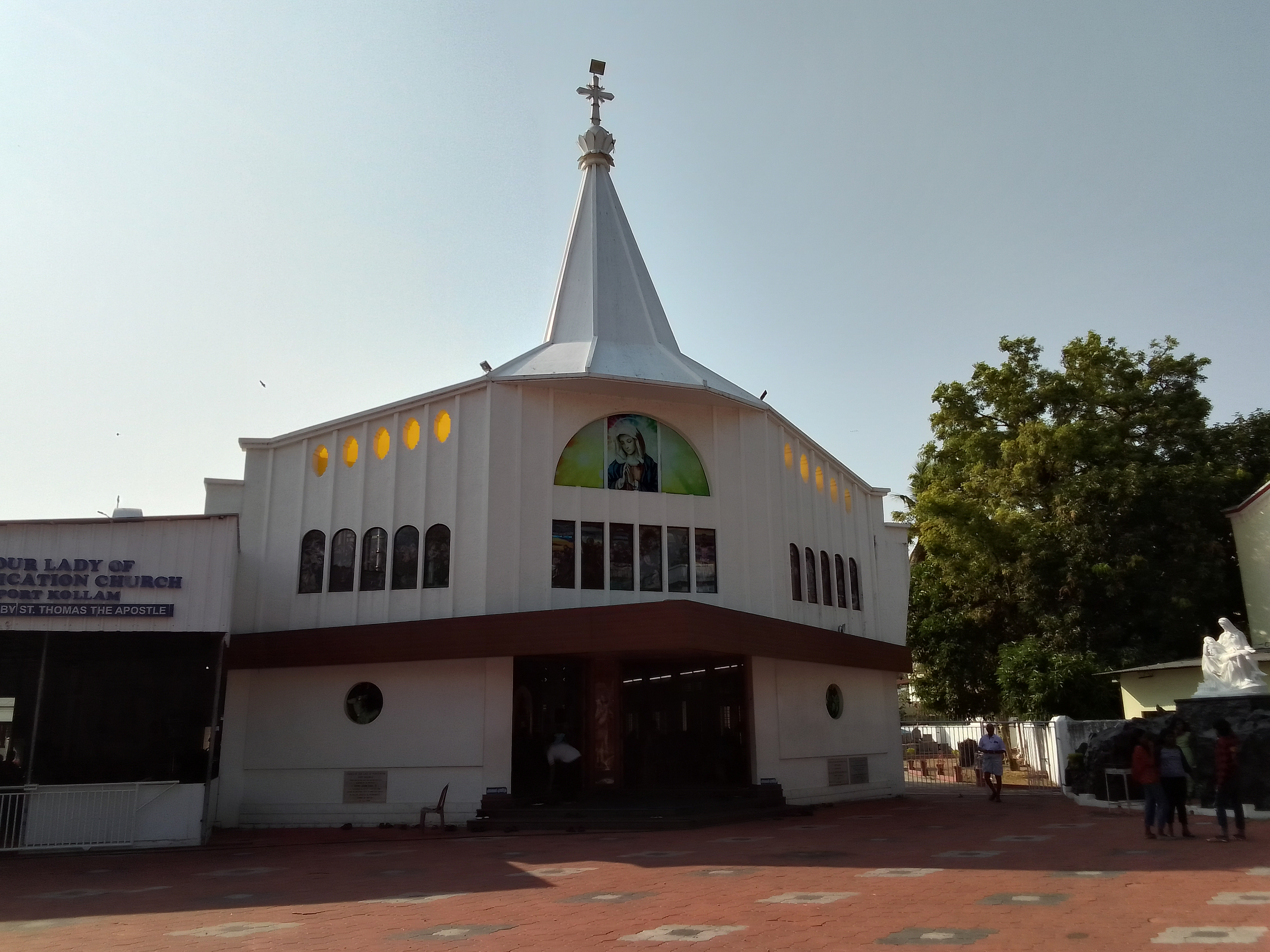

- Location in Kerala, India
- 8°52′52″N 76°34′3″E
- Location: Kollam, Kerala
- Country: India
- Language: Malayalam
- Denomination: Roman Catholic
- Tradition: Roman Rite

History
- Founded: CE 52
- Founder: Thomas the Apostle
- Dedication: Our Lady Of Purification
- Other dedication: Thomas the Apostle
- Events: The feast of presentation (February 2); Feast of Saint Thomas (July 3); Assumption of Mary (August 15)

Architecture
- Functional status: Active

Administration
- District: Kollam
- Archdiocese: Archdiocese of Trivandrum
- Diocese: Diocese of Quilon
- Parish: Port Kollam

Clergy
- Archbishop: Thomas J. Netto
- Bishop: Paul Antony Mullassery
- Vicar: Fr. Manoj Antony

Our Lady of Purification Church also known as the Port Kollam Church is a historic Roman Catholic church near Kollam Port in Kollam district of Kerala. According to ecclesiastical tradition the church was established by Thomas the Apostle in 52 CE along with six other churches in Kerala and these churches together are called Ēḻarappaḷḷikaḷ. The church follows Latin Rite and is in the Roman Catholic Diocese of Quilon.

== History ==
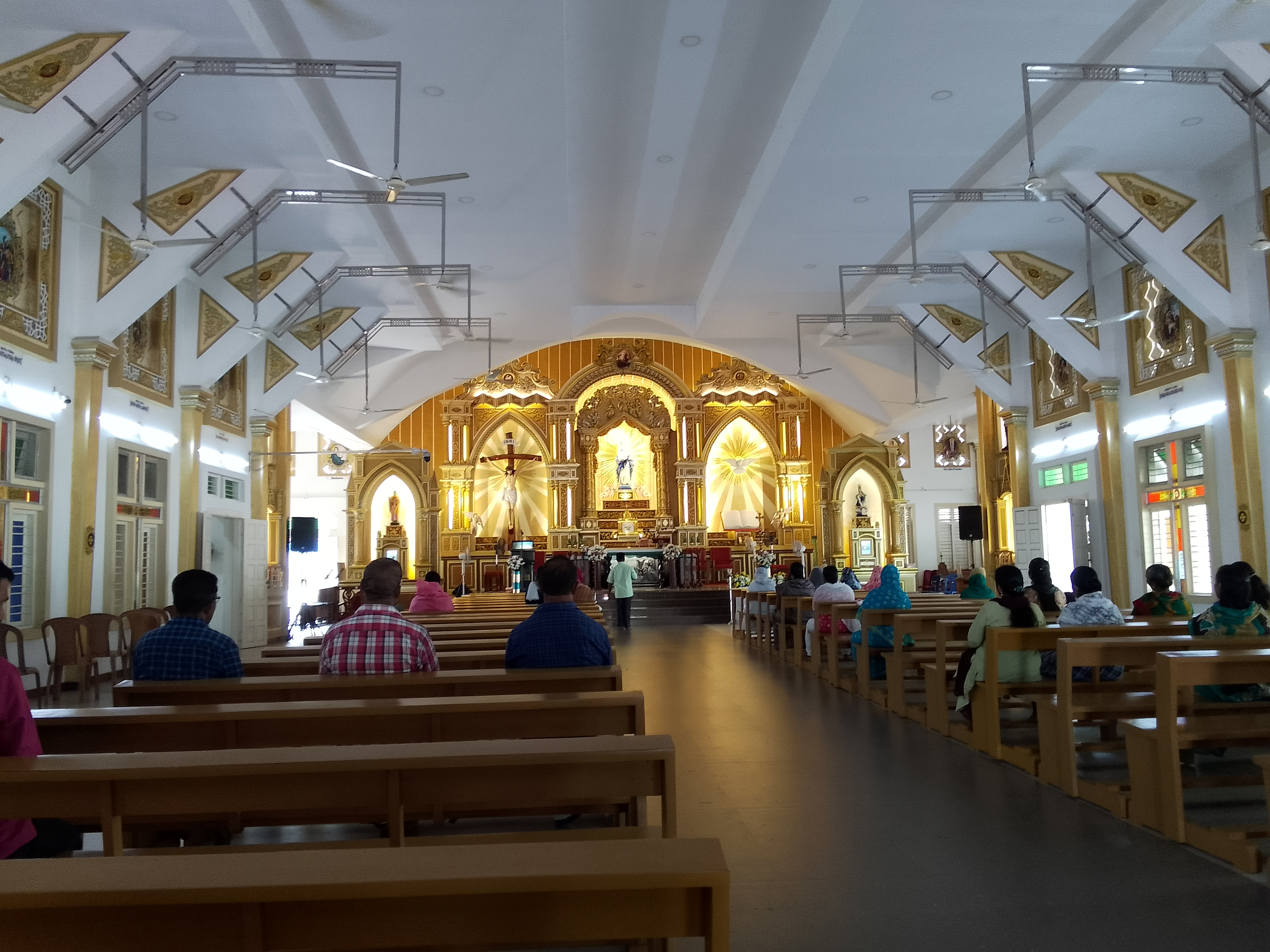
Holy Altar of Kollam port church

Tradition holds that in AD 52, Thomas the Apostle travelled to Kerala's coast. For people who were baptized by Thomas to worship, a church was built in Kollam between CE 52 and 78. However, Violent sea erosion destroyed this church. The believers built a second church for worship with the King of Kollam's approval, but it was also destroyed by sea erosion. The ruins of the second church are still visible in the sea during low tides. The name "Pallikallu" given to it by the local fishermen literally translates as "the stone of the great church". A group of local divers retrieved a rock from the submerged church ruins in February 2021, and it was then installed in the church as a symbol of the community's unwavering faith. The Pope John XXII designated Kollam (Quilon) as the first diocese in India in 1329 and there was a church called Kollam church before the arrival of the Portuguese in the sixteenth century. Later, the Portuguese constructed a number of additional churches in the area, leading to the renaming of Kollam Church as "Port Kollam Church". The Port Kollam parish was also blessed by the visit of Francis Xavier as part of his missionary activities along the Malabar coast. A new church, constructed in 1912 and dedicated to Our Lady of Purification, stood for more than 70 years, and at the end of the 20th century, a reconstruction plan was started to build the church present today. The foundation stone for the reconstruction was blessed by Pope John Paul II in Thiruvananthapuram on 8 February 1986 during his Apostolic Pilgrimage to India. The church was finally blessed on 23 January 1993 by the Bishop of Kollam, Joseph G. Fernandez.

== Liturgy Timings ==
Weekly Liturgy Schedule
Day	Time	Liturgy
Sunday	6.00 am 7.30 am 9.00 am	Mass; Mass; Mass for Children
Monday	6.30 am 5.00 pm	Mass; Mass + Novena to Thomas the Apostle
Tuesday	6.30 am	Mass
Wednesday	6.30 am	Mass
Thursday	6.30 am	Mass
Friday	6.30 am	Mass
Saturday	6.30 am	Mass + Novena to Our Lady of Perpetual Help

== Annual Events ==
Along with other universal festivities of Christendom, three great feasts are revered and fervently observed in the church each year by the faithful.

=== Feast of Our Lady of Purification ===
Thousands of followers of all faiths and religions flock to the feast of Our Lady of Purification (പരിശുദ്ധ ശുദ്ധീകരണമാതാവിൻ്റെ കോൺഫ്രിയ തിരുനാൾ മഹോത്സവം), which is celebrated annually from January 23 to February 2. The legend behind this celebration is that, in accordance with the Old Testament, a mother would bring her son to the Temple 40 days after his birth in order to present herself for purification and to present the child to God (Leviticus 12). When Jesus was a newborn, Joseph and Mary took him to the Jerusalem Temple where they offered Him to God as an offering (Luke 2:22–40). So, every year a feast is held to remember this occasion. As a result, the Holy Mother in this occasion is also known as Kanikka Mathavu (കാണിക്ക മാതാവ്).
The Church will be illuminated and decorated with vibrant lights beginning with a ceremony to hoist the flag on January 23 to announce the start of the festival. During the festive days, religious discourses such as Bible conventions and special prayers will be held. On February 1, there will be a large procession (പ്രദിക്ഷണം) that will cover most of Port Kollam, and people will decorate the streets with Mother Mary statues in a lovely backdrop that has been enhanced with candles, lights, and flowers. A special ritual takes place on the feast day (February 2). Women with their newly born babies (below 2 years) come to the church and submit them before Saint Mary as an offering.

=== Feast of Saint Thomas ===
Tradition holds that on July 3, AD 72, at Chennai's St. Thomas Mount, Thomas the Apostle was speared to death. Every year on July 3, the Port Kollam Church commemorates this martyrdom by celebrating Thomas the Apostle's pilgrimage feast (വിശുദ്ധ തോമാശ്ലീഹായുടെ തീർത്ഥാടന തിരുനാൾ). On the eve of the feast day, there is a procession carrying the relic of Thomas the Apostle covering places beyond the ecclesiastical jurisdiction of the Port Kollam parish. On the feast day, a jubilant holy mass is conducted, and most commonly, the mass will be a pontifical mass led by a bishop. The rededication of the relic on the altar and the subsequent lowering of the raised flag mark the conclusion of the feast.

=== Feast of Assumption of Mary ===
The feast of the assumption (പരിശുദ്ധ കന്യകാമാറിയത്തിൻ്റെ സ്വർഗ്ഗാരോപണ തിരുന്നാൾ മഹോത്സവം) is fervently observed in the Port Kollam church on August 15 each year. The celebration of Assumption Day commemorates the doctrine that Mary, the mother of Jesus Christ, was believed to have had both her body and soul taken up into heavenly glory at death. Flag hoisting, special liturgies, and a prayerful procession are all part of the Assumption celebrations. It's interesting that India's independence day and the feast of assumption both fall on the same day. The Flag of India's colours will be used to usually decorate the altar with flowers.

== Relics ==
Thomas the Apostle's remains were sent to a number of locations after his death, but the majority of them were eventually interred in the Basilica di San Tommaso in Ortona, Italy. In 1958, Jerome M. Fernandez, the then Bishop of Kollam, brought the relics of Thomas the Apostle from Ortona, Italy, and placed them in the Bishops' House of Quilon Diocese. On June 30, 2006, this relic was taken from the bishop's house and, after a devout reception from various parishes along the coastal region, it was finally enshrined in the altar of the Port Kollam church.
The altar of the Port Kollam church also holds a relic of Mother Teresa.

== Shrines ==
Within the church's premises, there are two shrines. The oldest shrine is dedicated to Friday devotion to 'Ecce Homo' (Kaiketty Easho, കൈകെട്ടി ഈശോ). This shrine's statue was delivered to this parish in 1806. On Fridays, a large number of people gather to pray for all of their intentions. Devotees have shared testimonials of the miracles they have experienced through Kaiketty Easho. The new shrine dedicated to Saint Thomas was consecrated in 2006 by the then kollam bishop, Stanley Roman.

== List of Parish Priests ==
Year	Name of the Priests
1879–1886	Fr. J. Alleluia B. V. Louza
1886–1894	Fr. B. Gonsalves
1894–1903	Fr. Haveriar
1903–1905	Fr. Augustin
1905–1907	Fr. Mary Ephraem Gomes
1907–1908	Fr. Dominic
1908–1909	Fr. Franciscus X Periera
1909–1910	Fr. Marcelline Mendez
1910–1917	Fr. Antony Fernadez
1917–1920	Fr. M. Koiparambil
1920–	Fr. E. Dias
1920–1925	Fr. G. J. Arooja
1925–1929	Fr. Bernard Ben Fernandez
1929–1934	Fr. G. J. Arooja
1934–1939	Fr. Bernard Ben Fernandez
1939–	Fr. Morris
1939–1941	Fr. B. Fernandez
1941–1946	Fr. Seraphine
1946–1952	Fr. A. J. Comeons
1952–1956	Fr. Marian Dominic
1956–1967	Fr. Valerian Fernandez
1967–1969	Fr. Christopher Morris
1969–1974	Fr. S.S. Netto
1974–1979	Fr. Abraham Joseph
1979–1983	Fr. Richard Fernandez
1983–1988	Fr. Jose Puthenveedu
1988–1990	Fr. Richard Fernandez
1990–1993	Fr. Silvie Antony
1993–2002	Fr. Lazar S. Pattakadavu
2002–2006	Fr. James Puthenpura
2006–2011	Fr. Alphonse S
2011–	Fr. Prem Grehary
2011–	Fr. Lawrence Abel
2011–2013	Fr. Sephrin K.B.
2013–2016	Fr. George Mathew
2016–2018	Fr. Vincent Machado
2018–2021	Fr. Xavier Lazar
2021–2022	Fr. Shani Francis
2022–2024	Fr. Jackson James
2024–2026	Fr. Franklin Francis
2026-	Fr. Vincent Machado
2026-	Fr. Manoj Antony

== List of Presidente ==
Year	Name of Presidente	Place	Name of Procurador
1951	Antony Cruz Planther	Pallipurayidom	J. Isaac
1952	Joseph Kurusappan	Kaikkara	Viscri Anthomy
1953	Joseph Thambi	Kaikkara	Janees Zarocky
1954	Manual Francis	Vadakkupuram	Thomas Lewis
1955	Jusa Augustin	Kaikkara	Augustin Peter
1956	Anthony Cruz Marcelle	Vadakkupuram	Anthony Joseph
1957	Pichapetty Joseph	Sangam Purayidom	Joseph Sebasthy
1958	Thomas Pancruz	Kaikkara	Rocky Joseph
1959	Janis Sebasthy	Vadakkupuram	Gracian Antony
1960	Thomas Louis	Kaikkara	Thomas Julian
1961	Janis Philip	Pallipurayidom	Philip Joseph
1962	Kurishuvareeth Marian	Poor Colony	Marian Stephen
1963	Thomas Julian	Kaikkara	Joseph Sebasthy
1964	Kurishu Anthony	Kaikkara	Sebasthy Muthayya
1965	Kurishupilla Pawel	Kaikkara	Sebasthy Jacob
1966	Jusa Sebasthy	Kaikkara	Augustin Alexander
1967	Jusa Angel	Kaikkara	Angel Carlos
1968	Jusa Augustin	Kaikkara	Vareethkutty George
1969	Rocky Joseph	Kaikkara	Pancruz Isaac
1970	Dominic Isteph	Sangam Purayidom	George Isteph
1971	Agustin Peter	Kaikkara	Agustin Clement
1972	Joseph Albert	Kaikkara	Albert Joseph
1973	Silvester Joseph	Kaikkara	J. Saltreek
1974	Sebasthy Joseph	Depo Purayidom	Sebasthy Simon
1975	Francis Simon	Vadakkupuram	Francis David
1976	Anthony Joseph	Pallipurayidom	Vareeth Joseph
1977	Ambrose Thomas	Pallipurayidom	Simon Francis
1978	Sebasthy Stephen	Depo Purayidom	Leons Gabriel
1979	Planther Laboy	Pallipurayidom	Francis Stephen
1980	Francis David	Fishermen Colony	Sebasthy Nazareth
1981	A. Martin	Kaikkara	T. Jacob
1982	Gabriel Barnabas	Depo Purayidom	Sebasthy Antony
1983	Albert Joseph	Kaikkara	Pancruz Carmayas
1984	Silvester George	Vadakkupuram	Sebasthy Pious
1985	George Antony	Vadakkupuram	Antony Norbert
1986	Anthonypilla Antony	Kaikkara	Antony Peter
1987	S. Mathiyas	Fishermen Colony	S. Clement
1988	Isteph Stephen	Vadakkupuram	Stephen Antony
1989	Janis Isaac	Pallipurayidom	Jose James
1990	Nicolas George	Kaikkara	Nicolas Franklin
1991	Thomas Sebastian	Kaikkara	Sebastian Ansel
1992	T. George	Depo Purayidom	Elias Francis
1993	Laboy Paul	Depo Purayidom	Francis Hillary
1994	Antony Julian	Kaikkara	Peter Joseph
1995	Thomas Jacob	Kaikkara	M. Ansel
1996	Isteph Lawrence	Vadakkupuram	Lawrence Augustin
1997	Marian Alex	Kaikkara	Sebasthy Johnny
1998	Simon Alphonse	Fishermen Colony	Simon Bosco
1999	Francis Stephen	Fishermen Colony	Stephen Sunil
2000	Antony Francis		Manual Joseph
2001	Simon Francis		Francis Joseph
2002	Janiskutty Cyril	Fishermen Colony	Cyril Sunil
2003	Leons Gabriel	Depo Purayidom	Barnabas Samson
2004	Ernest David	Fishermen Colony	Donbosco David
2005	Francis Hillary		Johnny Sajan
2006	Simon Raymond (Jerald)	Vadakkupuram	Johnny Samson
2007	Joseph Peter	Kaikkara	Stephen Julian
2008	Simon Cyril		Thomas Cyril
2009	Martin Ansel		Jacob David
2010	Johnny Leons		Johnny Job
2011	Augustin Lawrence		Augustin John
2012	Isaac John Gilbert		John Gilbert Jithu
2013	Martin Ambrose		
2014	Antony Manian		Benchamin Clement
2015	Simon Bosco	Vadakkupuram	Alphonse Ashwin
2016	Ansel Joseph		Peter
