= Paul Antony Mullassery =

Indian bishop

His Excellency, The Right Reverend Dr. Paul Antony Mullassery
- Bishop of Quilon
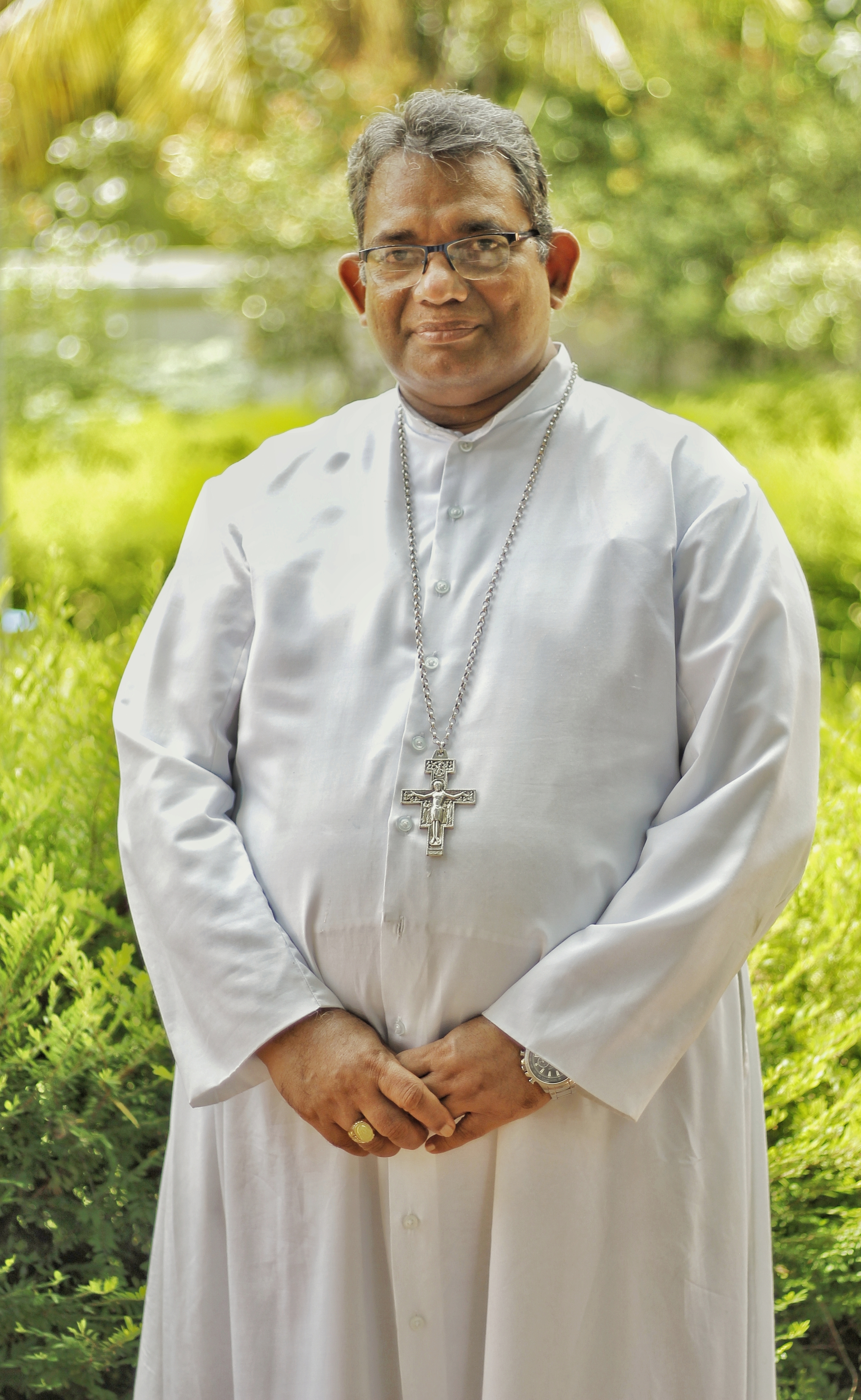
- Bishop Paul Antony Mullassery 2020
- Church: Catholic Church
- Diocese: Quilon
- Appointed: 18 April 2018
- Predecessor: Rt. Rev. Dr. Stanley Roman
- Other posts: Chairman - KCBC Family and Pro-life Commission; Vice Chairman - KCBC Laity Commission; Vice Chairman - KCBC Education Commission
- Previous posts: Vicar General; Episcopal Vicar; Judicial Vicar

Orders
- Ordination: 22 December 1984 by Rt. Rev. Dr. Joseph Gabriel Fernandez
- Consecration: 3 June 2018 by Rt. Rev. Dr. Stanley Roman

Personal details
- Born: 15 January 1960 (age 66) Kaithakody, Kollam
- Residence: Bishop's House, Thangasseri, Kollam
- Education: Doctorate in Canon Law
- Alma mater: Pontifical Urban University, Rome
- Motto: Progress and Joy in Faith

Sainthood
- Feast day: 15 January

Styles of Paul Antony Mullassery
- Reference style: His Excellency; The Right Reverend
- Spoken style: Your Excellency
- Religious style: Bishop

Paul Antony Mullassery (born 15 January 1960) is the 14th Bishop of Roman Catholic Diocese of Quilon. His Lordship also served as Judicial Vicar since 2013 and the Vicar General of the Diocese since 2017 as well as the Judicial Vicar of the Diocese. He was ordained as the Bishop of Quilon on 3 June 2018 at Fatima Mata National College ground with many Bishops attending the function. He would be a celebrant in the mass on 24 February 2019 which would mark the start of the canonization process of Bishop Jerome. M. Fernandez.

== Early life and education ==
His Lordship Bishop Mullassery was born in Kaithakkodi in Kanjiracodu on 15 January 1960, to Margareta and Anthony Gabriel. His father was a qualified veterinary Vaidyar, also popular in the locality as “Kala vaidyar”. He completed his primary education in Kanjirakode at St. Margaret LP school, and high school in Trinity Lyceum School, Kollam. He joined St. Raphael minor seminary, Kollam in 1969 and studied philosophy and theology in Saint Joseph’s Pontifical Seminary, Alwaye, graduating in 1978. He completed his doctorate in canon law from the Pontifical Urbaniana University, Rome. He was ordained a priest on 22 December 1984 for the diocese of Quilon.
