= St Andrew's Church, Kovilthottam =

Coordinates: 8.9953°N 76.5232°E

- St Andrew's Church Roman Catholic Church, Kovilthottam
- St Andrew's Church, Kovilthottam
- Location: Kovilthottam, Kollam, India
- Country: India
- Denomination: Roman Catholic Church

History
- Status: Church
- Founded: 1398; 628 years ago
- Dedication: Saint Andrew
- Dedicated: 1779

Architecture
- Functional status: Active
- Architect: Yovakim de Santiago
- Style: Portuguese Colonial
- Completed: 1779

Administration
- District: Kollam
- Province: Kollam
- Diocese: Roman Catholic Diocese of Quilon

Clergy
- Bishop: Stanley Roman

St Andrew's Church, Kovilthottam is a historic colonial-era Roman Catholic church that is located in the Panmana–Chavara panchayat, Karunagappalli taluk, Kollam district, Kerala, India.

Masses are held in English and follow the Roman Rite liturgy.

== History ==
It was established and first built in 1398. It was rebuilt in 1779 by the Franciscan missionary Father Yovakim de Santiago. The church is also a parish church, part of the Diocese of Quilon, established in the 14th century.

The 1779 church was built in the Portuguese Colonial style, and dedicated to Saint Andrew. The church building was renovated in the 2000s, and subsequently consecrated by the Bishop of the Roman Catholic Diocese of Quilon, Stanley Roman in 2006.

== Setting ==
Kovilthottam is a small coastal village and a port, between Chavara T.S. canal part of the Kerala backwaters and Arabian Sea to its west, it is approachable from Chavara from the iron footbridge. The Church is a popular pilgrimage and tourist destination of Chavara.
