= Fatima Mata National College =

Educational institute in Kerala

Coordinates: 8.885941°N 76.601958°E

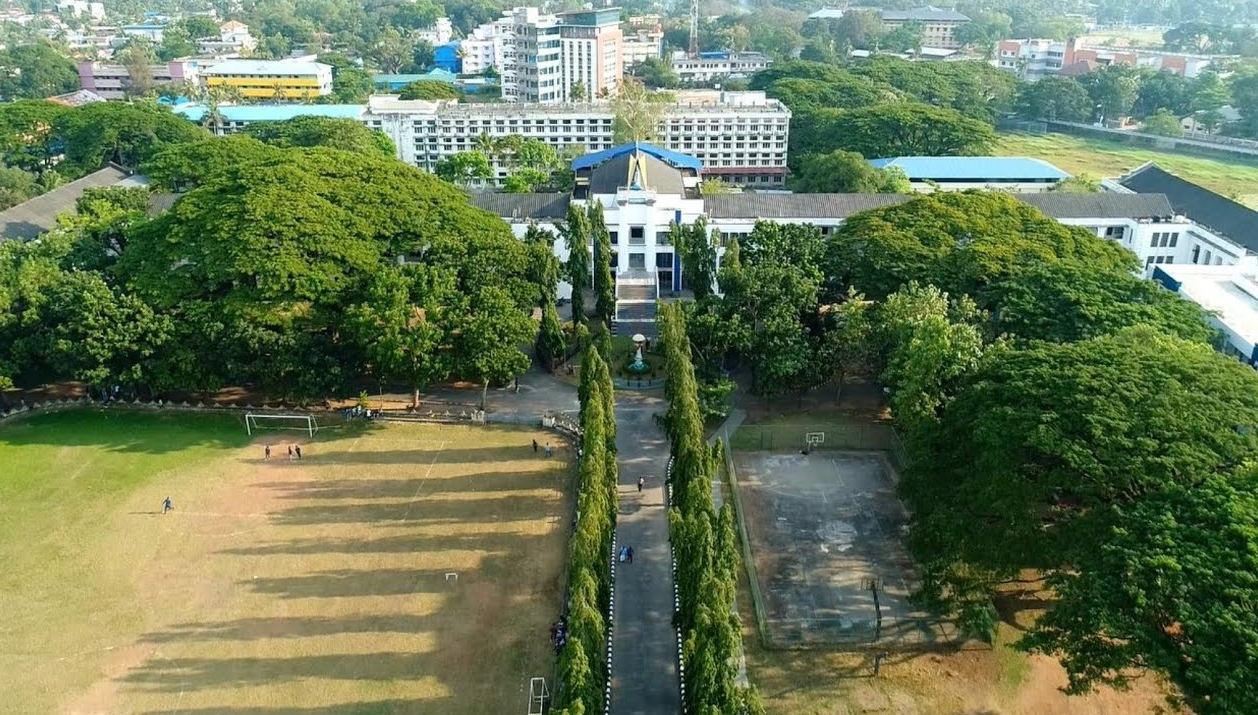
- Motto: Per Matrem Pro Patria
- Type: Aided
- Established: 1951; 75 years ago
- Founder: Rt. Rev. (Dr.) Jerome M. Fernandez
- Principal: Dr. Manohar D Mullassery
- Location: Karbala, Kollam, Kerala, India
- Campus: 16.6 acres
- Website: fmnc.ac.in

Fatima Mata National College is an autonomous aided college located in Kollam, Kerala. Founded in 1951, by Bishop Jerome M. Fernandez, the first native Bishop of the Diocese of Quilon, it is named after Our Lady of Fatima, a Catholic title of the Virgin Mary.

The college was ranked 92nd in India by the National Institutional Ranking Framework (IIRF) in 2022. It is accredited by the National Assessment and Accreditation Council (NAAC) with an 'A' Grade, affiliated to the University of Kerala and approved by the University Grants Commission (UGC). In 2025, the college celebrated its 75th anniversary, designated as its Diamond Jubilee, with events attended by notable figures including the Vice President of India, C. P. Radhakrishnan.

== Rankings and affiliations ==
College rankings

General – India
- NIRF (Colleges) (2022): 92

In 2022, the National Institutional Ranking Framework (NIRF) placed Fatima Mata National College in the 92nd position among all colleges in India.

It is accredited by the National Assessment and Accreditation Council (NAAC) with an 'A' Grade, affiliated to the University of Kerala and approved by the University Grants Commission(UGC).

== Motto ==
The school's motto is PER MATREM PRO PATRIA (through the Mother for the Fatherland).

== History ==
The college was founded in 1951 by Jerome M. Fernandez Thuppasseril, the first native Bishop of Quilon. The college was formally inaugurated on 29 December 1952 by Norman Cardinal Gilroy, Papal Legate to India.

It was elevated to the status of a first grade college with the introduction of degree courses in Commerce, Economics and Zoology. This was followed by the introduction of courses in Botany, Chemistry, Mathematics and Physics. Physical resources were added in the form of hostels, sports pavilions, chemistry block, auditorium, playgrounds, an NCC office, a hockey stadium, a language lab, basketball courts, a botany garden, computer labs and research centres.

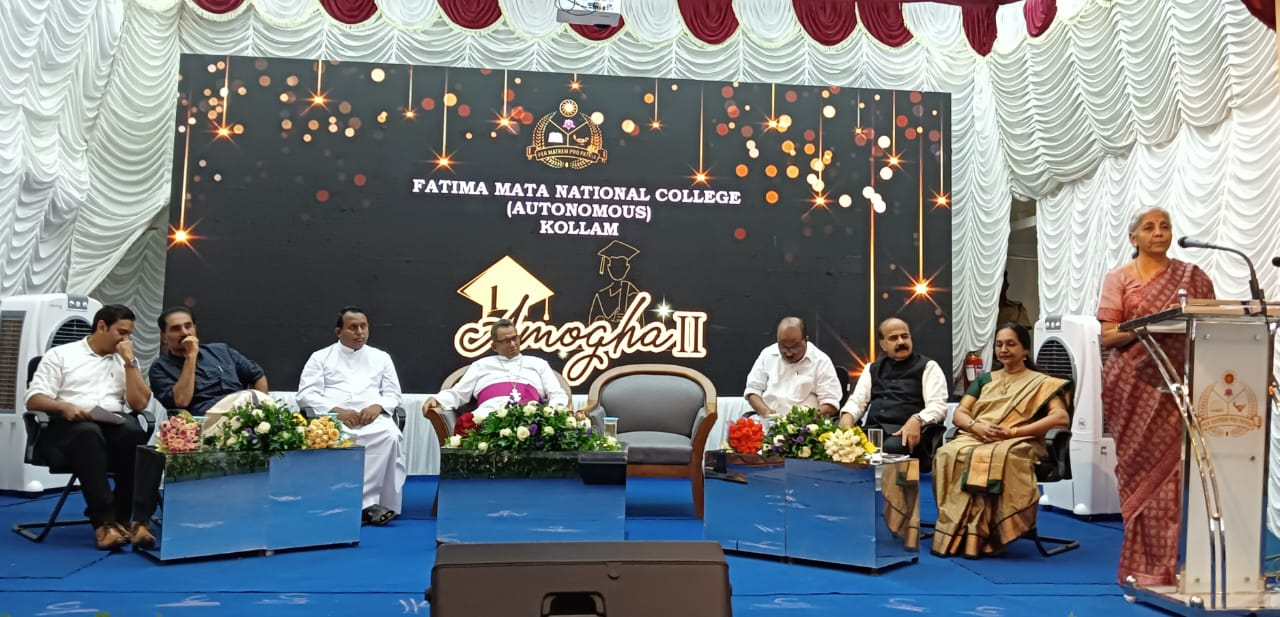
Graduation Ceremony 2023

Nirmala Sithraman attended the 2023 graduation ceremony at the college campus.

In 2025, the institute celebrated its Diamond Jubilee, celebrating its 75th anniversary. Vice President of India C P Radhakrishnan attended the event as the chief guest.

== Principals ==
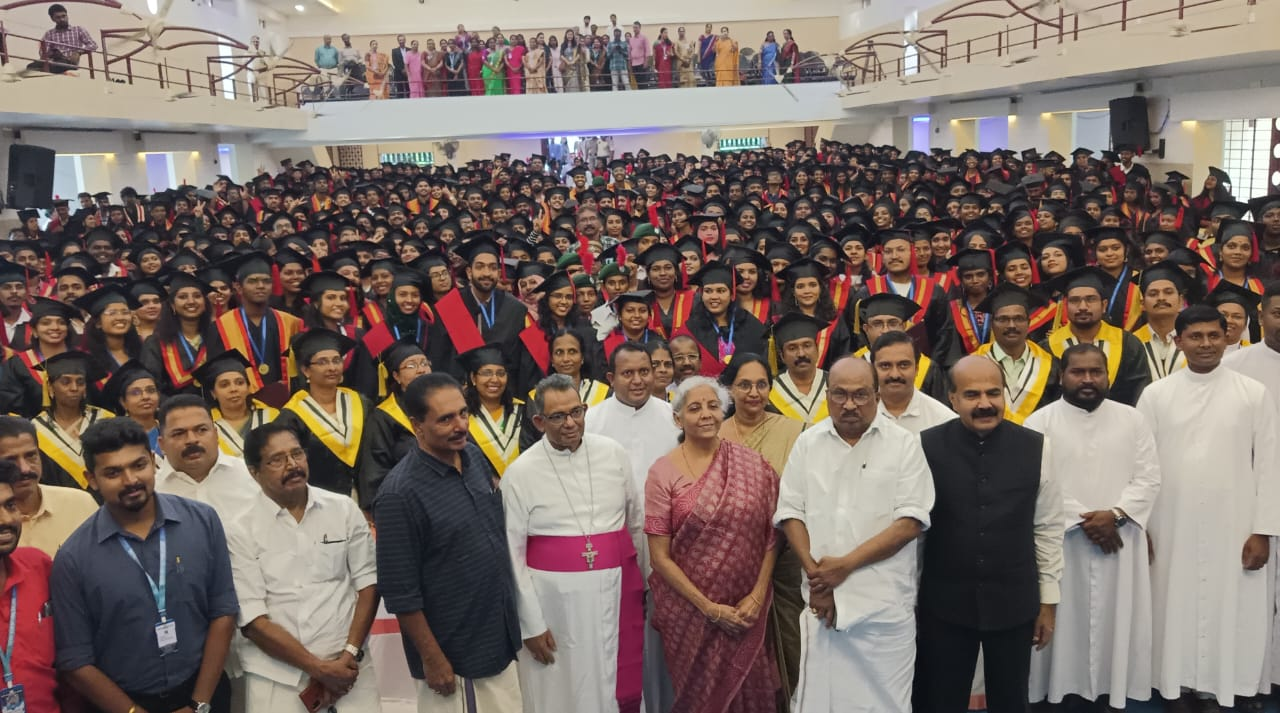
Graduation day, 2023

- Msgr. Joseph Kureethadom, 1951–1952
- Fr. Mathew Kottiath, 1952–1960, 1965–1969
- Fr. C. M. George, 1960–1965
- Msgr. A. J. Rozario, 1969–1984
- Rev. Richard P. Fernandez, 1984–1988
- Fr. (Bishop of Quilon 2001-2018) Stanley Roman, 1988–1996
- Prof. K. Napoleon, 1996–1997
- Dr. G. Henry, 1997–2004
- Prof. C. K. Felix, 2004–2006
- Dr. Sr. Soosamma Kavumpurath, 2006–2015
- Dr. Vincent B. Netto, 2015–2021
- Dr Jojo P.J., 2021-2022
- Dr Cynthia M. Catherine, 2022-2026
- Dr Manohar D Mullassery, 2026-present

== Managers ==
- Msgr. Victor Fernandez, 1951–952
- Msgr. Bernard D'cruz, 1952–1965
- Msgr. Peter Thekkevilayil, 1965–1974
- Fr. Alphonse Thundil, 1976–1984
- Msgr. A. J. Rozario, 1984–2006
- Fr. Anil Jose, 2006–2018
- Fr. Rolden Jacob, 2018-2022
- Fr. Abhilash Gregory, 2022–present

== Timeline ==
- 1961 Start of postgraduate courses in Botany and Commerce, followed by courses in Physics, Zoology, Economics, English, Psychology, Chemistry and Polymer Chemistry, Travel and Tourism Management, Malayalam, Mathematics.
- 1966-1967 Open-access library and auditorium opened.
- 1980 St. Joseph's Guidance and Counselling Centre opened.
- 1984 Centre for Research and Post Graduate Studies opened.
- 1997–1998 Computer labs opened in the Departments of Mathematics and Commerce.
- 1998 Upgrade of the Department of Zoology to a Research Centre, followed by the Department of Commerce the following year.
- 1999 Language Laboratory for English and hockey stadium opened.
- 2000 Golden Jubilee celebrations.
- 2001 Accreditation by NAAC at Four Star level.
- 2001–2002 The Institute of Distance Education degree courses started.
- 2005–2006 The Departments of Economics and English were elevated to Research Centres.
- 2007 NAAC Reaccreditation (B++).
- 2013 NAAC reaccredited with "A" Grade.
- 2019 Ranked 83 by NIRF.
- 2020 NAAC Re-Accredited A Grade.

== Notable alumni ==
Notable alumni include:

- Justice Raja Vijayaraghavan V.
- Eugene Pandala, Indian architect
- Balachandra Menon, Actor, Director, Script writer, Lyricist, Producer and Lawyer
- K. P. A. C. Sunny, Film Actor
- Suresh Gopi (1980), Film actor, Television anchor, Former member of Rajya Sabha, Central Minister
- N. K. Premachandran, Indian politician, Member of Parliament
- James Albert, Indian scriptwriter
- Chavara Parukutty Amma, Indian artist
- Kundara Johnny, Indian actor
- M B Suresh Babu, Olympian
- Dr. A.V. George, Member, Kerala State Commission for Backward Classes (public service)
- J. Alexander IAS, Former Chief Secretary to the Government of Karnataka
- Akhil Maraar Writer, Director, Television reality show fame.

== Popular culture ==
Masterpiece (2017 film) shooting took place in Fatima Mata National College, Kollam.

== See also ==
- Educational Institutions in Kollam District
