= Perayam =

Perayam may refer to:

- Perayam, Kollam, village in Kollam district, near Kundara, Kerala, India. NSS Arts & Science College situated at Perayam. The NH183 passes through Perayam area.
- Perayam, Thiruvananthapuram, village in Thiruvananthapuram district, Kerala, India
