= Kanjiracodu =

- village
- Location in Kerala, India Kanjiracodu (India)
- Coordinates: 8.973720°N 76.669464°E
- Country: India
- State: Kerala
- District: Kollam
- Elevation: 30 m (98 ft)

Languages
  - Official: Malayalam, English
- Time zone: UTC+5:30 (IST)
- PIN: 629155
- Telephone code: 474
- ISO 3166 code: IN-KL-2 XXXX
- Vehicle registration: KL-02
- Nearest city: Kollam
- Lok Sabha constituency: Kollam
- Climate: Tropical monsoon (Köppen)
- Avg. summer temperature: 35 °C (95 °F)
- Avg. winter temperature: 20 °C (68 °F)

Kanjiracode in Kundara lies on the banks of the Kanjiracodu Kayal of Kollam district in Kerala, India. The area postal pin code is 629155.

The erstwhile ALIND or Aluminium Industries one of the earliest aluminum cable manufacturing units for the country began operations here. It also had major industries as the Kerala Ceramics and ALLIED Industries established here. The Aluminium Industries Limited came into existence, on 2 January 1946, promoted by then Seshasayee Group with its Conductor Division set up in Kundara, Kerala under technical collaboration from the world-renowned ALCAN, Canada.

The satellite town of Kollam is set to get an economic boost with the opening of the Technopark-Kollam in Kanjiracode.

Cutcherry mukku the junction beside the Mini Civil Station and the Village panchayat meets everyday shopping needs. Mukkada the central junction of Kundara caters to other consumer needs.

== See also ==
- St Antony's Church, Kanjiracode, a Latin Catholic church in Kanjiraco

Magalasseril Temple Kanjiracode
