= Jerome M. Fernandez =

Indian Roman Catholic bishop

Servant Of God Jerome Maria Fernandez
- Bishop Emeritus of Quilon
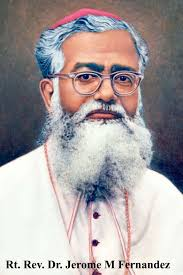
- First Indian bishop of The Roman Catholic Diocese of Quilon
- Church: Catholic Church
- Diocese: Quilon
- Appointed: 25 September 1937
- Installed: 12 December 1937
- Retired: 30 January 1978
- Predecessor: Vincent Victor Dereere, O.C.D.
- Successor: Joseph Gabriel Fernandez

Orders
- Ordination: 24 March 1928 by Bishop Aloysius Maria Benziger
- Consecration: 12 December 1937 by Archbishop Joseph Attipetty

Personal details
- Born: Jerome Maria Fernandez; 8 September 1901 Koivila, Quilon, India
- Died: 26 February 1992 (aged 90) Kerala, India
- Buried: Infant Jesus Cathedral; 8.8844° N, 76.5660° E
- Denomination: Roman Catholic
- Education: St. Aloysius English High School; St. Teresa's Major Seminary

Sainthood
- Venerated in: Catholic Church
- Title as Saint: Servant of God

Styles of Jerome Maria Fernandez
- Reference style: His Excellency; The Right Reverend
- Spoken style: Your Excellency
- Religious style: Bishop
- Posthumous style: Servant of God

Jerome Maria Fernandez was the first Indian bishop of the Roman Catholic Diocese of Quilon, India. He is the founder of the Missionary Sisters of St.Therese of Infant Jesus (MSST). He was declared Servant of God on February 24, 2019 by Kollam Bishop Paul Antony Mullassery at Infant Jesus Cathedral, Thangassery.

== Early life ==
Jerome M. Fernandez was born on 8 September 1901 in humble Thuppasseril Family of Koivila, a village in Thevalakkara Panchayath, Kollam, Kerala. He studied from St. Aloysius School, St. Raphael's Minor Seminary and St. Teresa's Major Seminary.

Bishop Jerome was born September 8 the Feast of the Nativity of the Blessed Virgin Mary, celebrating the birth of Jesus' mother, Mary. Much devoted to Mother Mary, Jerome adopted the name Maria later when he became the Bihop of Quilon.

== Priesthood ==
On 24 March 1928, Fernandez was ordained a catholic priest for the Roman Catholic diocese of Quilon.

== Episcopate ==
Fernandez was appointed bishop of the Roman Catholic diocese of Quilon on 25 September 1937 by Pope Pius XI and consecrated on 12 December 1937 by Archbishop Joseph Attipetty. Jerome M. Fernandez (1901–1992), the first indigenous Bishop of Quilon, served as the head of the diocese from 1937 to 1978, becoming at the time the youngest bishop in the world. His forty-one-year tenure was marked by a visionary commitment to education, social uplift, and healthcare. Convinced that education was the key to the integral development of his flock, he established and expanded numerous schools and colleges, culminating in the founding of Fatima College and later institutions such as Karmela Rani Training College (1960), Bharatha Matha Industrial Training Centre (1962), and Jyothi Niketan Women’s College (1973). In 1950, he realized his long-cherished dream of establishing a first-grade college at Varuvayal, which later inspired the creation of the Bishop Jerome Institute, named in his honor. Beyond education, Fernandez also advanced healthcare by founding Bishop Benziger Hospital and its associated nursing school, thereby strengthening medical services in the region. A staunch defender of minority rights, he opposed attempts to nationalize educational institutions in the 1940s and 1950s, safeguarding their autonomy. His socio-economic vision led to the establishment of the Quilon Social Service Society in 1960, which continues to support community development. He took retirement from pastoral services on 30 January 1978. He was succeeded by Joseph Gabriel Fernandez as the 12th Bishop of Quilon.

== Death ==
Fernandez died on 26 February 1992 in Kerala, India.

== Sainthood ==
The proceedings for the canonization was started on 24 February 2019 in Infant Jesus Cathedral, Kollam, Kerala and Bishop Jerome M. Fernandez was declared Servant of God.

== Legacy ==
Bishop Jerome Institute has been set up in Kerala, India in his memory.
