= St Antony's Church, Kanjiracode =

St Antony's Church
- St Antony's Church
- 8°58′13″N 76°40′11″E
- Location: Kanjiracode, Kundara, Kollam-691 501
- Country: India
- Denomination: Latin Catholic

Clergy
- Priest: Fr. Rozario B J

St Antony's Church, Kanjiracode is a Latin Catholic Church located in Kollam district in the Indian state of Kerala. The parish priest is Fr. Rozario B J. The Assistant Parish priest is Rev. Fr. Sony Charles.

== History ==
St. Antony's Latin Catholic Forane Church, Kanjiracode is listed among the first churches of Quilon diocese and of Kerala. The church occupies three acres on the northern side of old ceramics road (Sir C.P. Road) in an area dominated by a fishing community.

St. Thomas Christians migrated arrived near Kundara in the ninth century. The parish was officially established in 1502. St. Antony's was originally built and blessed in the name of Saint Lucia by the administrator of Cochin diocese. The construction was financed by Lakshmi Ammal (Mary Ammal), a Brahmin convert. The foundation stone was laid on 27 October 1609 and the church was blessed on 30 April 1609. The church was reconstructed and named after Anthony of Padua in 1633. After the diocese of Quilon was officially established, Kanjiracode remained under the jurisdiction of Cochin diocese under Padravado and remained there until 1893. In 1975 reconstruction was begun to accommodate more believers. The church was finally blessed on 26 January 1986 by the Bishop of Kollam, Joseph G. Fernandez, in the presence of A. Solomen, parish priest and dedicated to the papal visit of Pope John Paul II in Kerala.

== Festival ==
Patron saint Antony of Padua is celebrated on the Sunday preceding Ash Wednesday. The feast starts with the unfurling of the flag on the prior Sunday. The unfurling is a colourful function with religious pageantry that is attended by thousands of devotees. Besides liturgical functions, a religious discourse is held at St. Antony's shrine in Mukkada, in the evenings. People of all religious faiths attend these functions. On Saturday the day before the festival a procession is taken from the Church along with colorful floats of saints. The procession proceeds to Perayam, the northern boundary of the Parish and touches the southern boundary at Elampalloor and Mukkada. The Procession is attended by thousands of devotees from across the Diocese and beyond.

On the feast day High mass is celebrated in the morning by a senior church functionary. This is followed by Snehavirunnu (agape), a community Lunch partaken by ten thousand and more devotees, distribution of clothing to the poor, etc. The closing ceremony is the lowering of the flag in the evening with a procession around the church. One important feature is the participation of non-Catholics in the celebrations.

== Religious status ==
Average church attendance numbers two thousand. Bible study groups, Charismatic movements, Little way association, Legion of Mary, Sodality, Franciscan 3rd order, Jesus youth movement and KCYM active. St. Antony's Novena is conducted Tuesday evenings.

== Administration ==
The parish council consists of 25 members. The parish priest is the president of the council. The members are elected from the 8 parish wards. A four-member finance committee is selected from the council. This four-member committee assists the priest in other financial activities. B.C.C.:- 54 B.C.C. group are actively participating in all church activities.

== Status of women and children ==
Women of Kanjiracode Parish are independent and employed. Catechism classes are conducted by sisters of St. Margaret's Convent for children aged 5–17. A Bible festival is conducted every year and parish children won prizes in Forane, Diocese and State level.

== Services ==
Financial assistance is offered to poor families for education and also to help with illness. Parishioners help solve family and neighborhood disputes.

== Former pastors ==
The names of the Parish Priests up to 1888 were not recorded.

Former pastors
Antony Disusa
John
Mathew Cathanar
Simon Netto
Joseph Rodrigues
Francis Pulickal
Joseph Fernandez
Joseph Cruz
Antony Fernandez
Stephen Netto
Francis Fernandez
K.J. Yesudas
Charly Consekha
A. Solomon
Sebastian Conception
Peter Jose
GrigaryJohn Aravijo
Albert Parisavila
Yacoob Cathanar
Silvy Antony
Martin Fernandez
Paul Cruz
J.P. Renaira
James Puthenpura
Bernad Decrues
Xavier Laser
Michel Netto
Mary John
Dominic
Tomy Kamans
K.J. Kameyonce

== Chapel and shrines ==
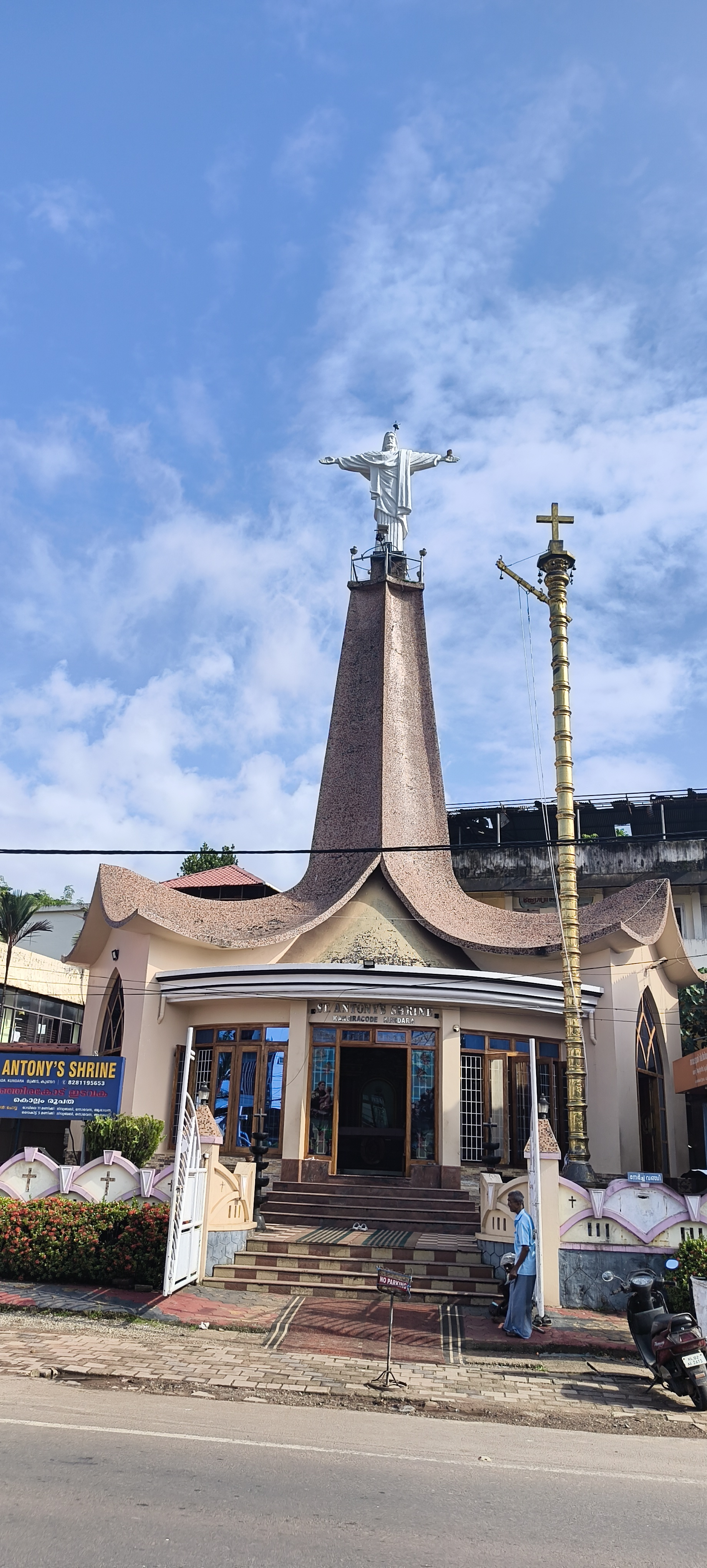
St. Antony's Shrine, Mukkada

Former pastors
! Shrine	Festival
St. Antony's shrine	June
Little flower, Perayam Jn.	October
Shrine of St. Patric, Kanjiracode	
Shrine of St. Jude, Kanjiracode	
Shrine of St.Alphonsa, Edakkara	July
Shrine of Christ the king and lord, Kanjiracode	November
