= Karbala, Kollam =

Karbala
- Neighbourhood
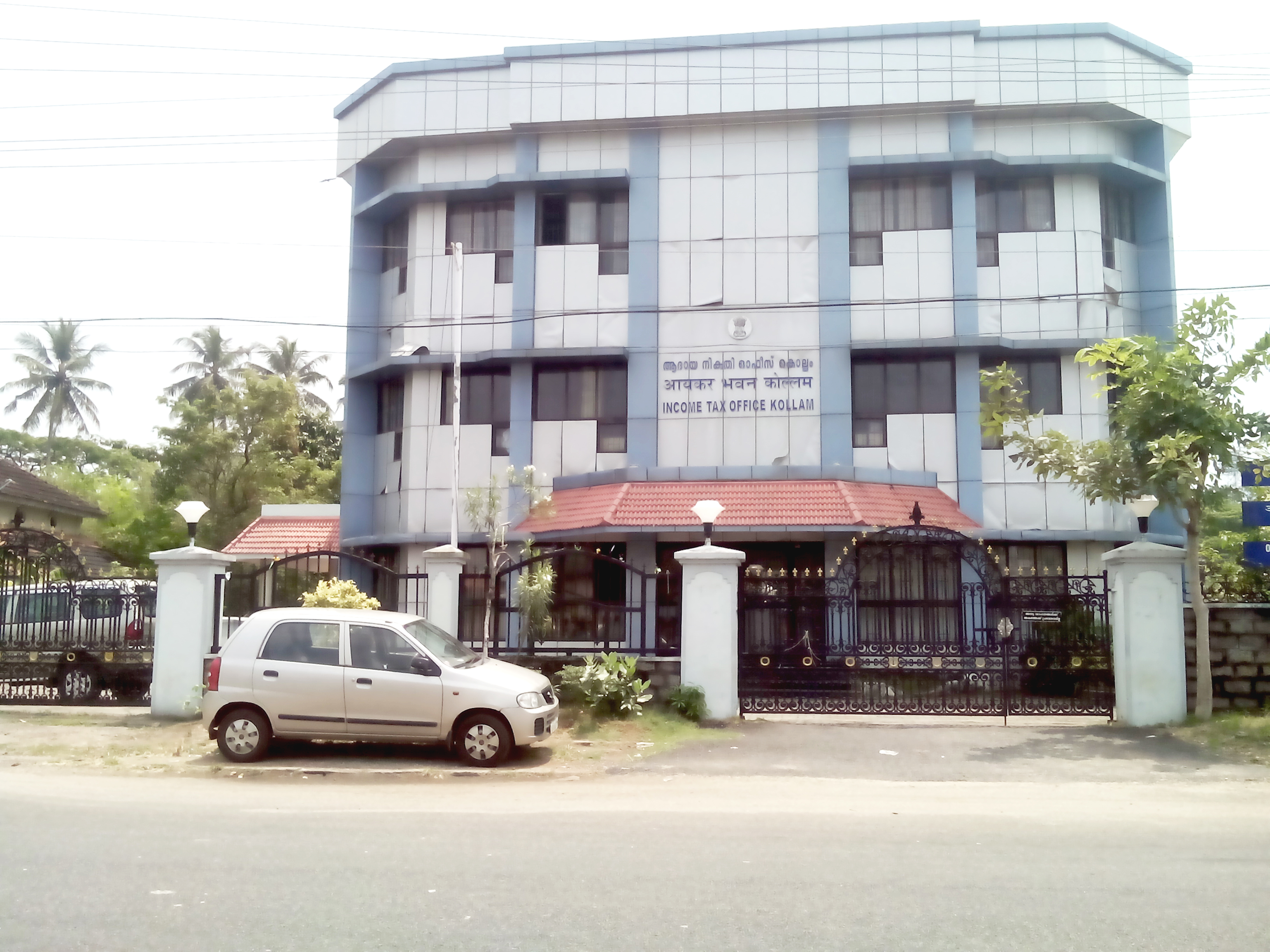
- Income Tax Office in Karbala, Kollam

- Location in Kollam, India Karbala (Kerala) Karbala (India)
- Coordinates: 8°53′11.018″N 76°36′0.453″E
- Country: India
- Region: Desinganadu
- State: Kerala
- City: Kollam
- Governing Body: Kollam Municipal Corporation

Languages
  - Official: Malayalam
- Time zone: UTC+5:30 (IST)
- PIN: 691001
- Telephone code: 0474
- Vehicle registration: KL-02
- Website: Kollam Municipal Corporation

Karbala is an important neighborhood and center for educational institutions in Kollam city, India. It is situated in the central region of the city. The area is in close proximity to Kollam Junction railway station. Several government offices and colleges are located within the Karbala area.

== Major colleges and government institutions in Karbala area ==
- Kollam Junction railway station
- Fatima Mata National College
- Bishop Jerome Institute
- Sree Narayana Guru College of Legal Studies
- V.N.S.S.College of Nursing
- Income Tax Office
- Village Industries office
- Karbala Trust Hall

== See also ==
- Chinnakada
- Pattathanam
- Kadappakada
