= Jordan Catala =

14th-century European Catholic bishop in India (1321–1330)

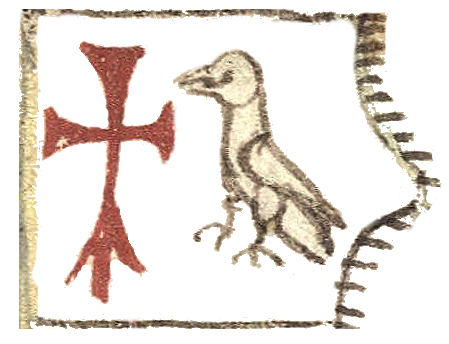
Christian flag of the King of Colombo, according to the Catalan Atlas (1375). Jordan and his "Book of Marvels" (Mirabilia descripta, 1340) was probably the source of the information about Colombo (modern day Kollam) in the Catalan Atlas.

Jordan Catala of Sévérac (fl. 1280-c. 1330 also known as Jordan de Catalunya) was an Occitanian Dominican missionary and explorer in Asia known for his Mirabilia descripta describing the marvels of the East.

== Name and family ==
Jordan's surname, Catala, is the Occitan for "Catalan" (from Latin Catalanus). It probably indicates his family's origins in Catalonia. Modern French authors occasionally render it Catalan, although a spelling with the final 'n' is not original. The alternative spelling Cathala is contemporary, but probably does not represent the Occitan pronunciation. The spelling Jordan is Occitan.

Jordan's Mirabilia descripta does not use his surname. It gives his name in Latin as Jordanus and describes him as oriundum de Severaco, a native of Sévérac-le-Château in the Rouergue. Local documentation reveals several persons named Catala active in and around Sévérac, including a notary named Jordan active between 1286 and 1318. Jordan's family does not seem to be connected with the lords of Sévérac.

== Birth and education ==
Jordan was probably born around 1275–1280, since the normal age for a long-distance emissary was about 45. There is no record of him studying in the Dominican province of Toulouse prior to the separation of the province of Provence in 1302. He probably did not join the Dominicans until later. He may have studied at the University of Toulouse. He completed his education in the Dominican convents of Persia, where he learned the Persian language.

== Travels ==
Jordan was possibly a disciple of Jerome of Catalonia. In 1302 Jordan may have accompanied Thomas of Tolentino, via Negropont, to the East; but it is only in 1321 that we definitely discover him in western India, in the company of Thomas and his companions. Ill-luck detained them at Thane in Salsette Island, near Bombay; and here Jordan's companions were killed on 8 and 11 April 1321.

Jordan, escaping, worked some time at Bharuch, in Gujarat, near the Narmada estuary, and at Suvali near Surat; to his fellow-Dominicans in north Persia he wrote two letters – the first from Gogo in Gujarat (12 October 1321), the second from Thane (24 January 1323/4) describing the progress of this new mission. From these letters we learn that Roman attention had already been directed, not only to the Bombay region, but also to the extreme south of the Indian peninsula, especially to Columbum (Kollam) in later Travancore; Jordan's words may imply that he had already started a mission there before October 1321.

From Catholic traders Jordan had learnt that Ethiopia (i.e. Abyssinia and Nubia) was accessible to Western Europeans; at this very time, as we know from other sources, the earliest Latin missionaries penetrated thither. Finally, the Epistles of Jordan, like the contemporary Secreta of Marino Sanuto (1306–1321), urge the Pope to establish a Christian fleet upon the Indian seas.

Jordan, between 1324 and 1328 (if not earlier), probably visited Kollam and selected it as the best centre for his future work; it would also appear that he revisited Europe about 1328, passing through Persia, and perhaps touching at the great Crimean port of Sudak. He was appointed a bishop in 1328 and nominated by Pope John XXII in his bull Venerabili Fratri Jordano to the see of Columbum (Quilon) on 21 August 1329. This diocese was the first Roman Catholic one in the whole of the Indies, with jurisdiction over modern India, Pakistan, Afghanistan, Bangladesh, Burma, and Sri Lanka. It was created on 9 August by the decree Romanus Pontifix. Together with the new bishop of Samarkand, Thomas of Mancasola, Jordan was commissioned to take the pallium to John de Cora, archbishop of Sultaniyah in Persia, within whose province Kollam was reckoned; he was also commended to the Christians of south India, both east and west of Cape Comorin, by Pope John.

== Mirabilia descripta ==
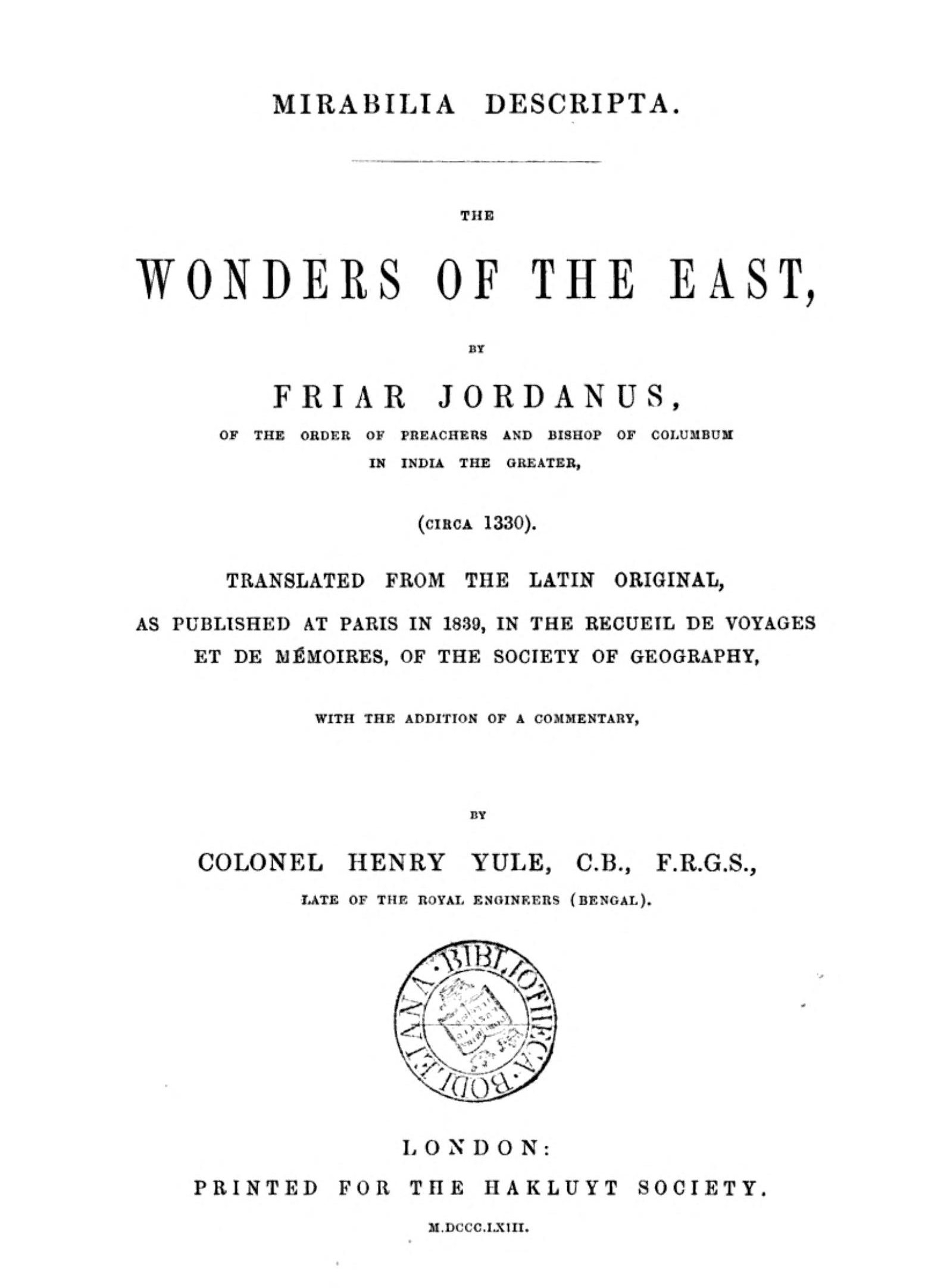
Mirabilia descripta, English edition 1863

Either before going out to Malabar as bishop, or during a later visit to the west, Jordan probably wrote his Mirabilia, which from internal evidence can only be fixed within the period 1329–1338; in this work he furnished the best account of Indian regions, products, climate, manners, customs, fauna and flora given by any European in the Middle Ages — superior even to Marco Polo's.

In his triple division of the Indies, India Major comprises the shorelands from Malabar to Cochin China; while India Minor stretches from Sind (or perhaps from Baluchistan) to Malabar; and India Tertia (evidently dominated by African conceptions in his mind) includes a vast undefined coast-region west of Baluchistan, reaching into the neighborhood of, but not including, Ethiopia and Prester John's domain. Jordan's Mirabilia contains the earliest clear African identification of Prester John, and what is perhaps the first notice of the Black Sea under that name; it refers to the author's residence in India Major and especially at Kollam, as well as to his travels in Armenia, north-west Persia, the Lake Van region, and Chaldaea; and it supplies excellent descriptions of Parsee doctrines and burial customs, of Hindu ox-worship, idol-ritual, and sutee, and of Indian fruits, birds, animals and insects. After 8 April 1330 we have no more knowledge of Bishop Jordan.

=== Extracts of Mirabilia descripta ===
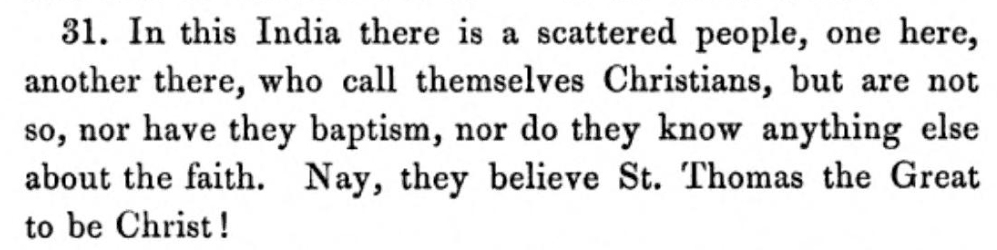
Catholic critical account of Saint Thomas Christians in India, written by Jordanus in 1329–1338 in Mirabilia descripta.

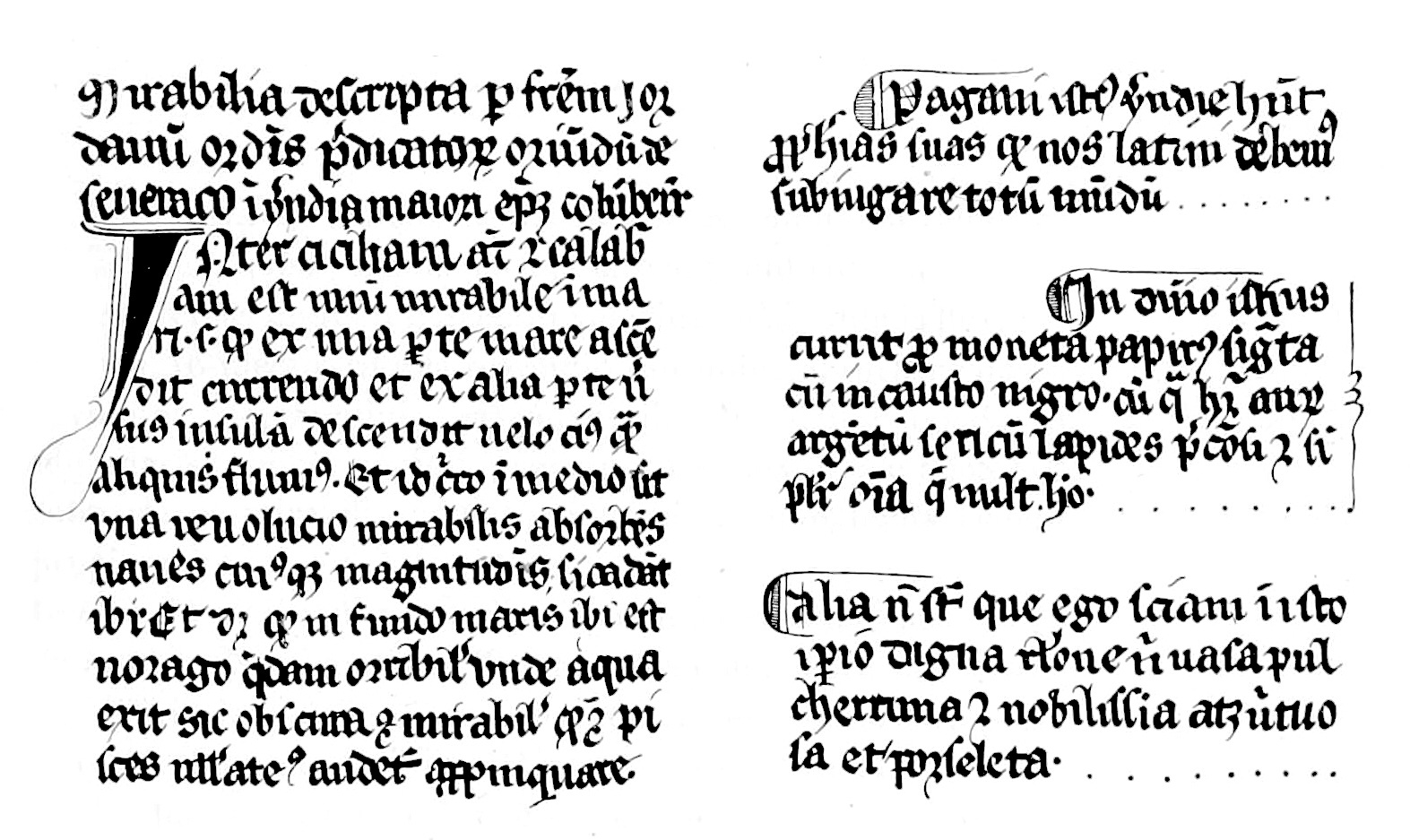
Original facsimile extracts from the unique manuscript of Jordanus, Mirabilia descripta (1329–1338)

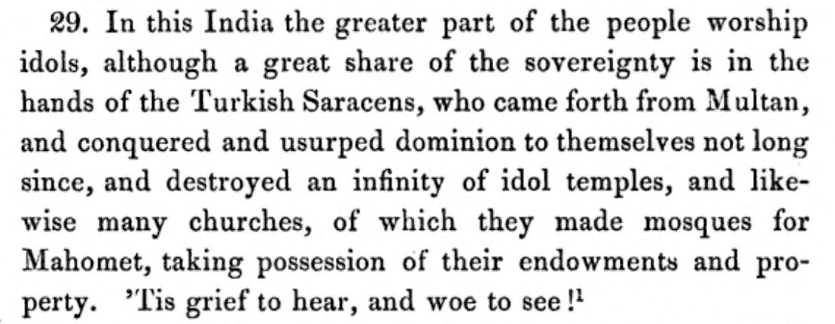
Jordanus, on the destructions of the "Turkish Saracens" in India (Mirabilia descripta, written in 1329–1338).

== See also ==
- Chronology of European exploration of Asia
