= Thomas of Mancasola =

Catholic bishop of Samarkand

Thomas of Mancasola, or Thomas of Mancasol (fl. 1328), was a Dominican cleric in the Chagatai Khanate who became bishop of Samarkand.

Prior to his appointment Thomas had served as a cleric in Mongol-ruled Turkestan. The region, in Thomas's time ruled by Eljigidey khan, allowed local Christians significant freedom to worship, and Thomas obtained a commendation from Eljigidey for the trip to Rome that saw him granted the bishopric of Samarkand.

Thomas is known from the Mirabilia of Friar Jordanus, which describes him as bishop of "Semiscat"; this place was positively identified as Samarkand during the nineteenth century. Thomas, according to the Mirabilia, accompanied Jordanus on a journey to take the pallium, an ecclesiastical vestment, to John de Cora, the newly appointed archbishop of Sultaniyah in Persia. Thomas's bishopric, along with that of Jordanus, fell within the province of this new metropolitan.
