= Infant Jesus Cathedral =

- Infant Jesus Cathedral, Tangasseri
- Bom Jesu Cathedral
- തങ്കശ്ശേരി വലിയപള്ളി
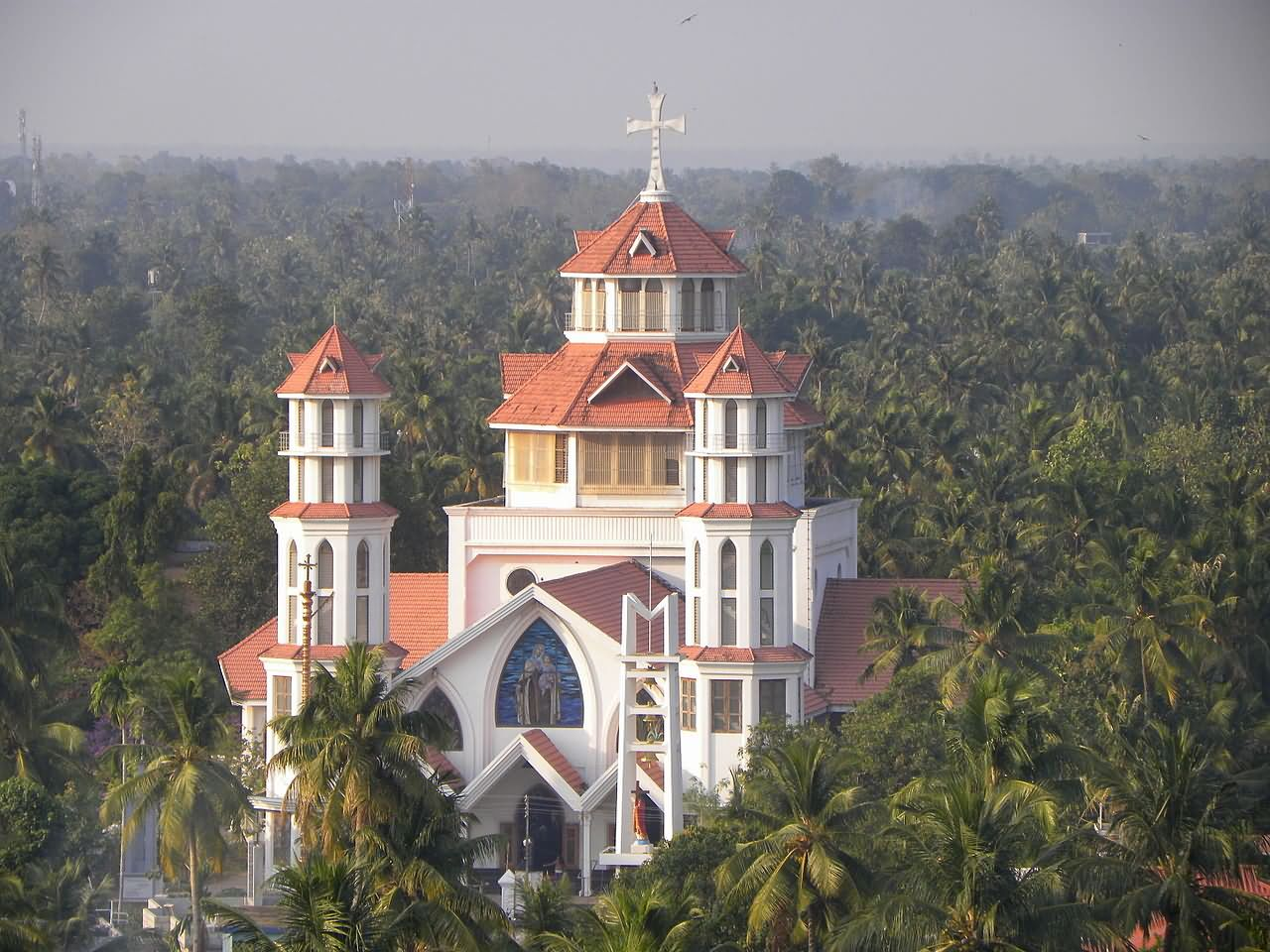
- Infant Jesus Cathedral of Quilon at Tangasseri
- Infant Jesus Cathedral
- 8.884644°N 76.565856°E
- Location: Tangasseri, Kollam(Quilon)
- Country: India
- Denomination: Roman Catholic Church

History
- Former name: Igreja do Bom Jesú (Church of Good Jesus)
- Status: Church, Cathedral
- Founded: AD 1614
- Dedication: Infant Jesus
- Consecrated: 3 December 2005 (New Structure)

Architecture
- Functional status: Active
- Architectural type: Portuguese
- Groundbreaking: 2000 (New Structure)
- Completed: 2005
- Construction cost: ₹45,600,000 (856,000 USD) in 2005

Administration
- District: Kollam
- Province: Roman Catholic Archdiocese of Trivandrum
- Diocese: Roman Catholic Diocese of Quilon
- Parish: Tangasseri

Clergy
- Bishop: Most Rev. Dr Paul Antony Mullassery
- Vicar: Rev. Fr. Joseph Sugun Leon

The Infant Jesus Cathedral (Malayalam: ഇൻഫന്റ് ജീസസ് കത്തീഡ്രൽ) (Portuguese: Igreja do Bom Jesú) is a historic Roman Catholic church established by Portuguese during 1614, situated at Tangasseri in the city of Quilon (Kollam), India. It is now the cathedral i.e the Seat of the Bishop of Roman Catholic Diocese of Quilon, the ancient and first catholic diocese of India. The Church remains as a memento of the Portuguese rule of old Quilon city.

== History ==
The history of Infant Jesus Cathedral dates back to 1503 when Tangasseri came under the control of the Portuguese. The Portuguese who came to Quilon in 1503 led by Afonso de Albuquerque made Tangasseri a well fortified city by building a fort, which was called Fortaleza da São Tomé (known as St. Thomas Fort). Saint Francis Xavier established a church, a college(São Salvador College), a printing press(São Salvador seminary Press), and a religious study centre at Tangasseri during his visits in 1544 and 1549. In 1614, the Portuguese established the Infant Jesus church in its present location.

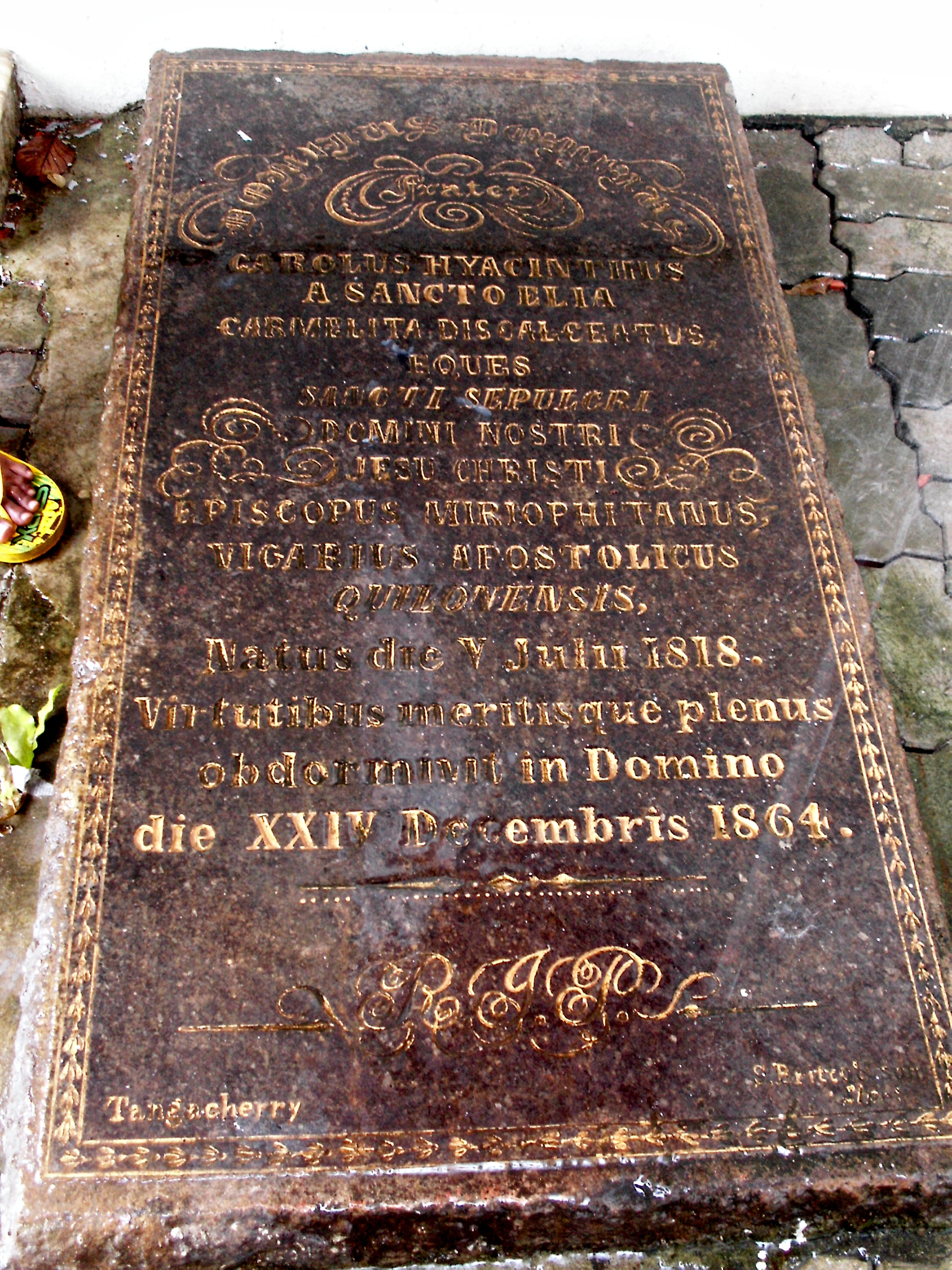
Grave slab of Bishop Charles Hyacinth Valerga in Quilon

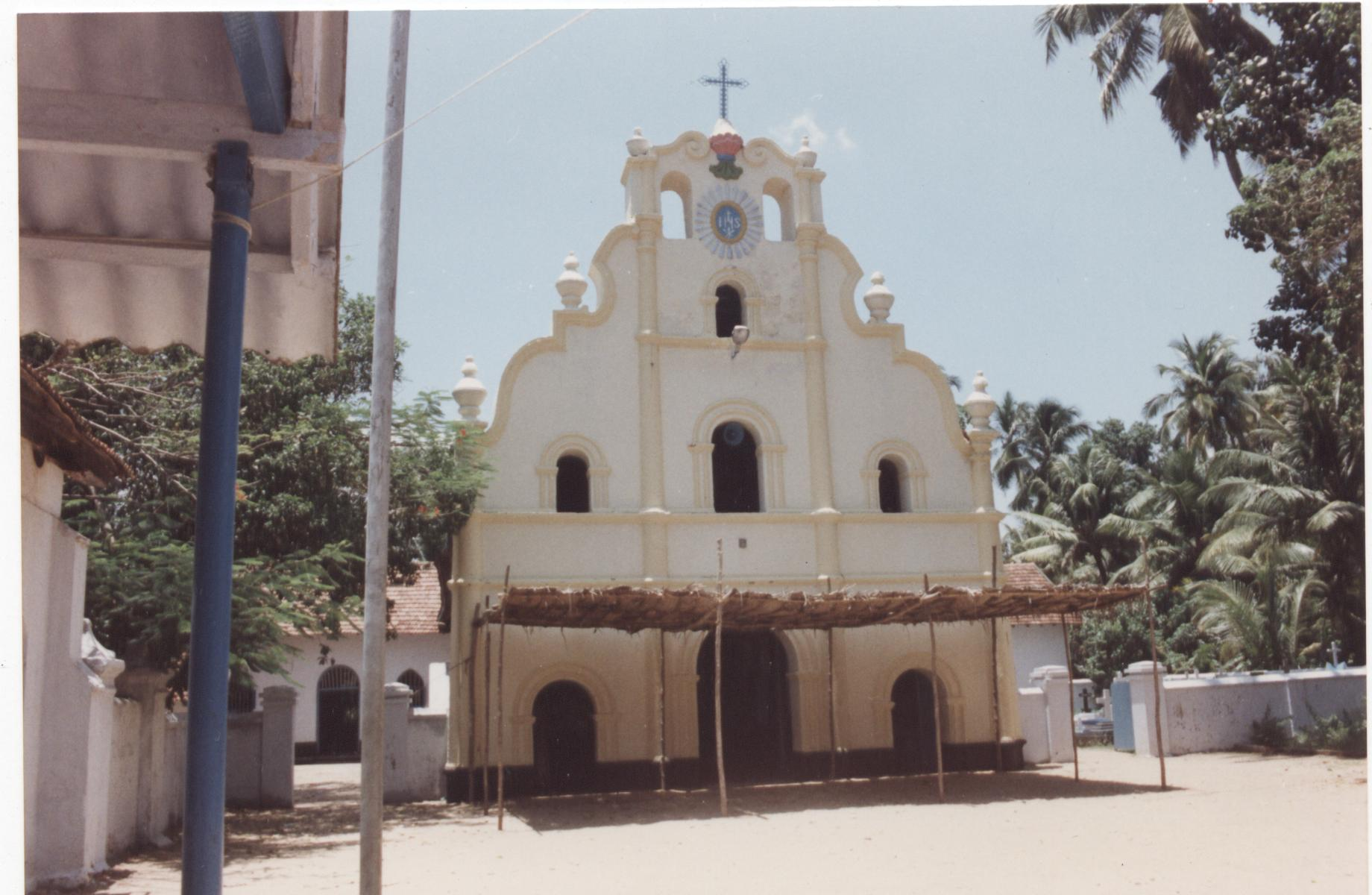
400-year-old Infant Jesus Cathedral at Quilon-Tangasseri. In 2006 it was demolished and replaced by a new building

Later in 1661, Dutch gained control of Tangasseri and started deteriorating churches and other structures built by Portuguese. But in 1789, the Carmelites missionaries, who have arrived at Quilon renovated this church and named it the Bom Jesu Church. In 1838 when Malabar Vicariate was erected with Verapoly as headquarters, Quilon was joined to it. Tangasseri retained its pivotal position in ecclesiastical parlance and became the base for Carmelite expeditions. Quilon vicariate was formed in 1845. Messenger Charles Hyacinth Valerga, pro-vicar Apostolic of Quilon died in Tangasseri on 24 December 1864 and was buried in the church. His successor Msgr. Maria Ephrem Carrelon was consecrated in Tangasseri in 1866.

Infant Jesus Church has been serving as the pro-cathedral of the Diocese of Quilon since 1886. Former Bishop of Quilon Jerome M. Fernandez is also buried in the Infant Jesus Cathedral.

As the old Pro-Cathedral was ageing, a plan for a larger building to accommodate the increasing congregation was put forward. The old church was demolished and the foundation stone was laid by bishop Joseph G Fernandez in 2000 during the tenure of Monsingor Paul Mullassery. Later in the year 2001 Stanley Roman became the Bishop of Quilon and continued construction. George Mathew took charge as the parish priest in 2002, taking an active part in the completion of the church in the year 2005.

The new structure was completed at a cost of ₹4,56,00,000 (US$845,000 in 2005) and was consecrated by Cardinal Telesphore Placidus Toppo, the Archbishop of Ranchi, on 3 December 2005, and elevated from pro-cathedral to cathedral. The church has mosaic paintings and glass paintings depicting various stages of Jesus's life. The biggest glass painting is that of the patroness of the Diocese of Quilon, Our Lady of Mount Carmel. A huge bell tower having 3 century-old bells is an adjacent structure to the cathedral, along with a small shrine dedicated to Saint Joseph. A new modern parish house with guest house is built adjacent to the cathedral to accommodate guests and as the residence of the parish priest. A small chapel is located under the cathedral and is used for small prayer meetings and masses. In 2015, the bell tower was renovated and three new shrines dedicated to various Catholic saints were concentrated. The saints whose statues are placed are Saint Anthony of Padua, Saint Sebastian, Saint Francis Xavier and Saint Devasahayam Pillai. In early 2016 one of the bells in the bell tower was automated.

The remains of Jerome M. Fernandez, the first native Bishop of Quilon, are buried in the prayer crypt below the Cathedral. Bishop Fernandez was elevated to the status of Servant of God—the first of four steps to sainthood—by Pope Francis on 25 February, 2019.

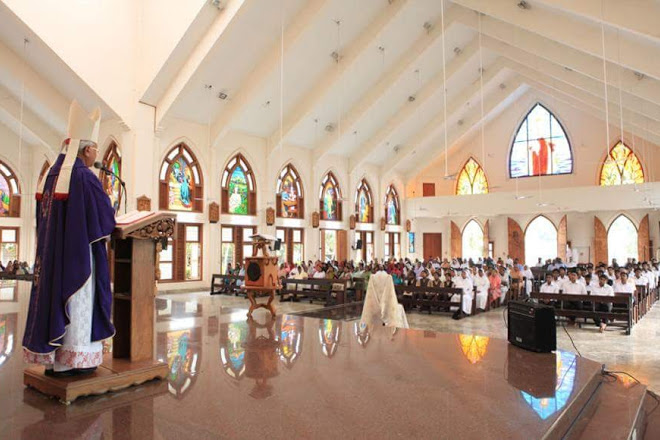
