= V. Seshasayee =

Indian businessman

V. Seshasayee (died 1958) was an Indian industrialist and the founder of the Seshasayee Group.

His cofounder R. Seshasayee, an amateur pilot, crashed and died in 1934 while flying a plane to drop flowers on Mahatma Gandhi, who was delivering a speech at the National College campus.
