= Aloysius Maria Benziger =

Swiss Catholic prelate (1864–1942)

Servant Of God Aloysius Maria Benziger
- Bishop of Quilon
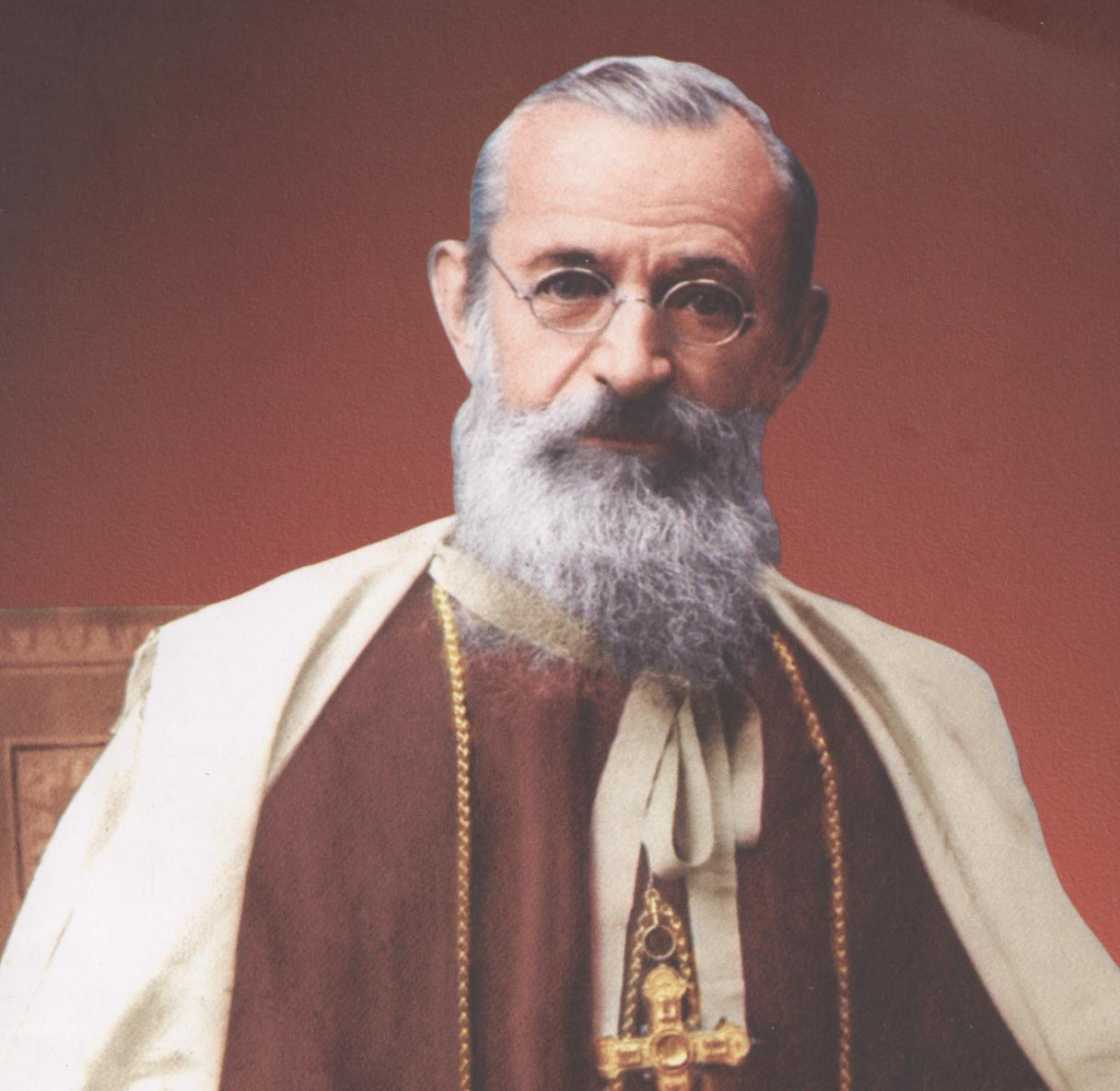
- Church: Catholic Church
- Diocese: Quilon
- Appointed: 16 August 1905
- Retired: 23 July 1931
- Predecessor: Ferdinand Maria Ossi
- Successor: Vincent Victor Dereere
- Other posts: Bishop Emeritus of Quilon (1931‍–‍1942); Titular Archbishop of Antinoë (1931‍–‍1942)
- Previous posts: Coadjutor Bishop of Quilon (1900‍–‍1905); Titular Bishop of Tabae (1900‍–‍1905)

Orders
- Ordination: 22 December 1888
- Consecration: 18 November 1900 by Ladislaus Michael Zaleski

Personal details
- Born: Adelrich Benziger; 31 January 1864 Einsiedeln, Switzerland
- Died: 17 August 1942 (aged 78) Trivandrum, India
- Buried: Carmel Hill Monastery, Trivandrum

Sainthood
- Venerated in: Catholic Church
- Title as Saint: Servant of God

Styles of Aloysius Maria Benziger
- Reference style: His Excellency; The Right Reverend
- Spoken style: Your Excellency
- Religious style: Bishop
- Posthumous style: Servant of God

Aloysius Maria Benziger (also known as Alois Benziger; 1864 – 1942) was a Swiss Catholic prelate, pioneer missionary, and Carmelite Father. He served as the Bishop of Quilon, Titular Bishop of Tabae, and Titular Archbishop of Antinoë.

== Early years and Formation ==
Aloysius Maria Benziger was born in Einsiedeln, Switzerland on January 31, 1864. His father was a distinguished citizen of the Swiss republic, a major in the army and the owner of a publishing house. His mother, Anna Maria née Koch, originally from Boswil, was the daughter of a farmer, and she had six children, of whom four were sons and two daughters. Benziger's first name was Adelrich and Benziger was his family name. When he joined the Carmelite first order, he took the name Aloysius Maria Benziger. Benziger went to primary school in Einsiedeln and then spent two years at the Benedictine abbey school. On the death of his elder brother, Louis Benziger, destined to take over the family business, in 1878, his father sent him to a business school in Frankfurt. Additionally, he took private lessons in theology and history from Johannes Janssen, a priest and historian. Likewise, he met Joseph Hergenröther in Frankfurt, a church historian who would later become a cardinal, and he chose him to be his confessor. The young student was greatly influenced by both of these people, and the desire to become a priest awoke in him. The father first objected to this request, so he sent his son to Downside College in Bath, England, to study languages after boarding school at the Institute Saint-Louis in Brussels.

The young Benziger had made up his mind to become a priest. He had met with the Discalced Carmelite order in Brussels and desired to join them. He joined the Bruges Carmelite convent in 1884 against his father's wishes, and on May 28, 1885, he professed his vows there, taking the name Alosiyus Maria Benziger. On December 22, 1888, Benziger was ordained as a priest at the St. Bavo Cathedral in Ghent.

== Bishop of Quilon ==
Benziger succeeded Bishop Ferdinand Ossi as Bishop of Quilon in 1906. His episcopate was marked by:

- Expansion of parishes and schools in Kollam and surrounding regions.
- Promotion of Carmelite spirituality and pastoral care among clergy and laity.
- Strengthening of Catholic institutions in coastal Kerala, particularly in Tangasseri, where he resided.

He served until his retirement in 1931.

== Role in the Syro-Malankara reunion ==
Benziger was a key figure in the discussions surrounding the reunion of Archbishop Mar Ivanios and the Malankara Church with Rome. In a letter to Apostolic Delegate Archbishop Edward Mooney, Benziger expressed his support for reunion, emphasizing its pastoral and ecclesial importance. His encouragement contributed to the eventual establishment of the Syro-Malankara Catholic Church in 1930.

== Later years and death ==
After retiring in 1931, Benziger continued to live in Kerala, dedicating himself to prayer and spiritual guidance. He died on 17 August 1942 in Trivandrum, India.

== Legacy ==
Benziger is remembered as a missionary bishop who combined pastoral zeal with ecumenical vision. His writings and letters reflect his commitment to unity and service. In 2018, the Diocese of Quilon initiated the cause for his canonization, declaring him a Servant of God.

In honor of his memory, Jerome M. Fernandez, the first Indian bishop of the Diocese of Kollam, established the Benziger Hospital in Quilon in 1948. The institution serves as a major healthcare facility in the region, reflecting the diocese's commitment to social service and pastoral care.

In continuation of this legacy of healing and service, the Diocese of Quilon later founded two major nursing institutions in Benziger's name. The Benziger School of Nursing was established in 1971, followed by the Bishop Benziger College of Nursing in 2004, which has since grown into one of South India's leading nursing colleges. Both institutions were created to honor Benziger's pioneering role in bringing trained nurse‑nuns from Switzerland to Travancore and promoting professional nursing education in Kerala.

== See also ==
- List of people declared Servants of God under Pope Francis
