= Diocese of Quilon =

Diocese in Kerala, India

Coordinates: 8.8843°N 76.5660°E

Diocese of Quilon Diœcesis Quilonensis
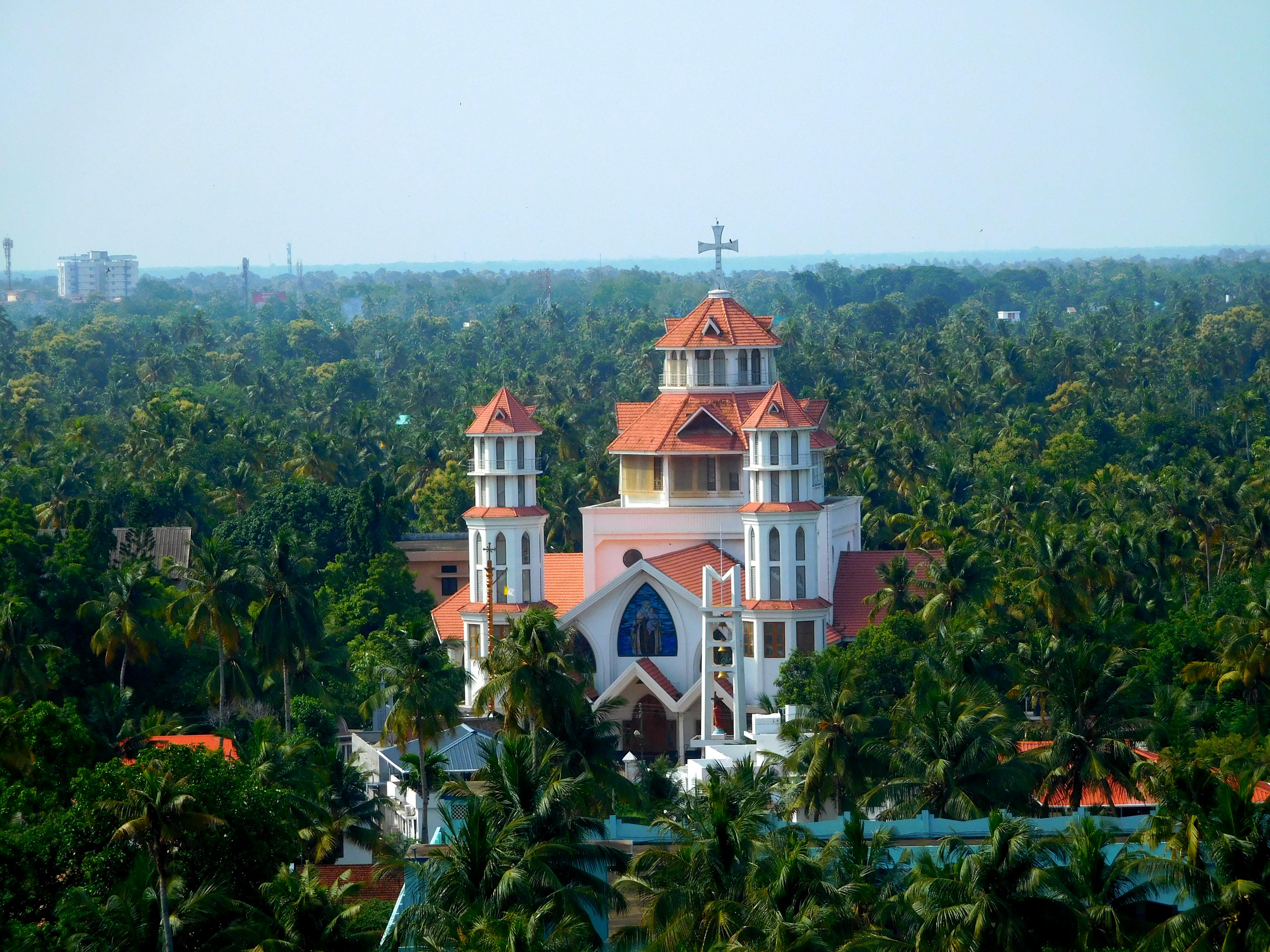
- Infant Jesus Cathedral in Thangassery

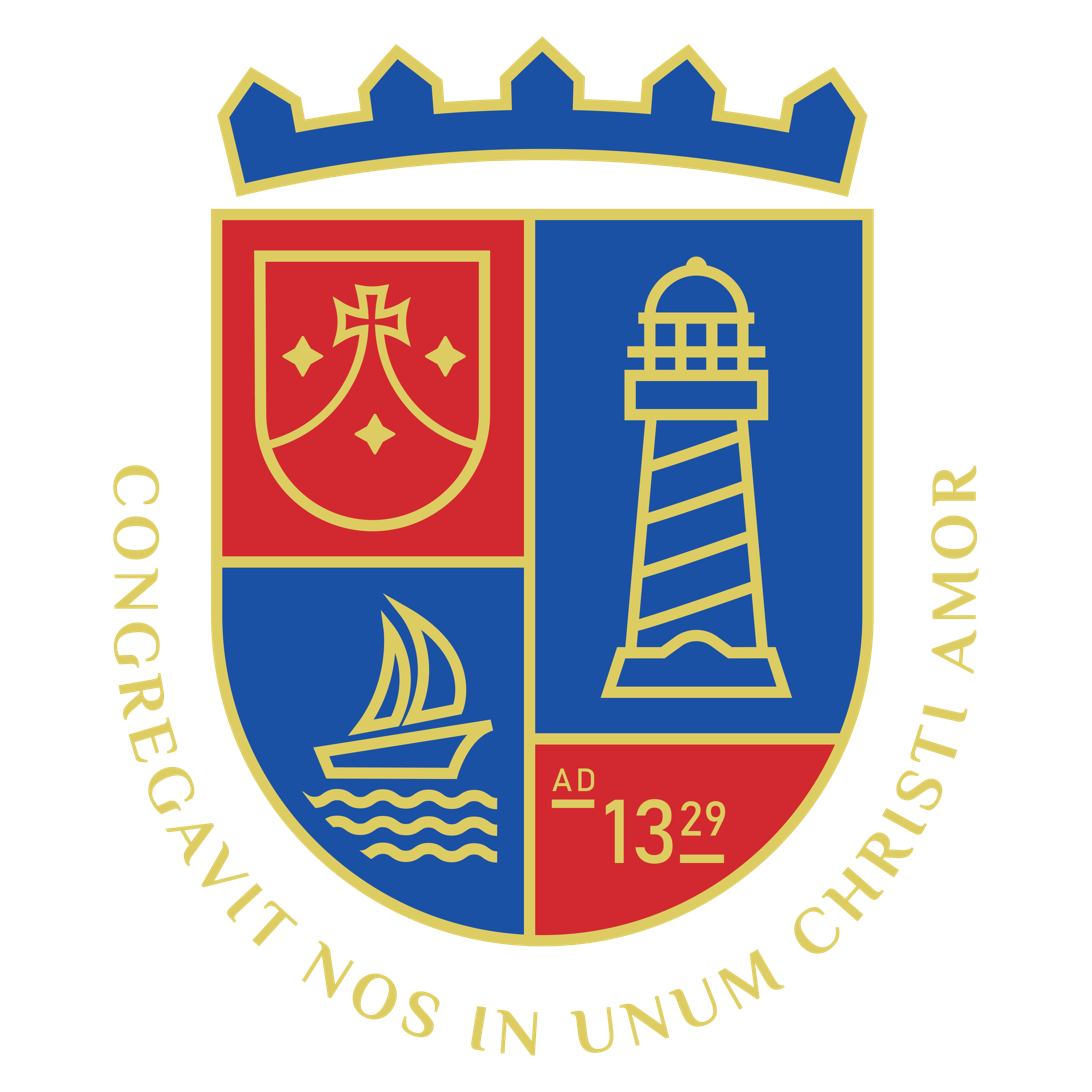
- Revised Coat of arms of the Diocese 2020

Location
- Country: India
- Ecclesiastical province: Trivandrum
- Headquarters: Bishop's House, Tangasseri, Kollam

Statistics
- Area: 1,950 km^{2} (750 sq mi)
- Population: Total; Catholics: (as of 2010); 5,309,000; 2,39,400 (4.5%)
- Parishes: 105

Information
- Denomination: Catholic Church
- Sui iuris church: Latin Church
- Rite: Roman Rite
- Established: 9 August 1329 (historical); 15 March 1853 (present diocese)
- Archdiocese: Roman Catholic Archdiocese of Trivandrum
- Cathedral: Infant Jesus Cathedral, Tangasseri, Kollam
- Patron saint: Our Lady of Mount Carmel
- Secular priests: 129
- Language: Malayalam

Current leadership
- Pope: Leo XIV
- Bishop: Rt.Rev.Dr Paul Antony Mullassery
- Metropolitan Archbishop: Thomas J. Netto
- Vicar General: Fr.Baiju Julian
- Episcopal Vicars: Fr.Joseph Detto Fernandez
- Judicial Vicar: Fr.Christopher Henry
- Bishops emeritus: Rt.Rev.Dr Stanley Roman

Website
- quilondiocese.com

The Diocese of Quilon (Latin: Diœcesis Quilonensis) is a Latin Church diocese of the Catholic Church based in the southern Indian city of Kollam. The diocese was created in 1329 but the Bishop did not take canonical possession and then Gregory XVI made Quilon as the new diocese suffragan of Verapoly on 1 September 1886. Then diocese was made as a suffragan in the ecclesiastical province of the metropolitan Archdiocese of Trivandrum. The Diocese of Quilon covers an area of 1,950 km^{2} (753 square miles) that contains a population of some 4.8 million. At least 4.8% of the people in the area are Catholic.

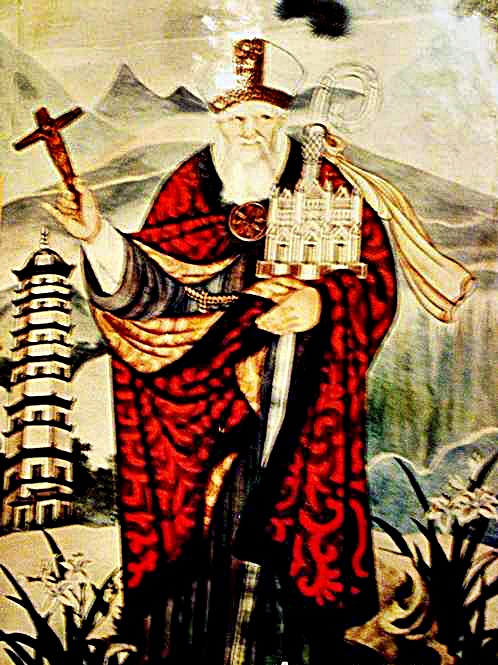
John De Marignolli, Papal legate in Quilon, 1348–1349.

The history of the Roman Catholic Church in Quilon begins with the erection of a diocese on 9 August 1329. This diocese was later suppressed. The present day Diocese of Quilon was established as an apostolic vicariate on 15 March 1853 by bifurcating the Apostolic Vicariate of Verapoly. It was elevated to a diocese on 1 September 1886.

As of 18 April 2018, Paul Antony Mullassery is the bishop of the Diocese of Quilon.

== History ==
=== Early history ===
According to tradition, St. Thomas the Apostle established seven churches along the southern part of west coast of India, and Quilon (pronounced Koy-lon) is the second in the list of the above seven churches. The official website of Kollam Diocese rejects the traditional claim that Thomas the Apostle founded churches in Kerala due to lack of historical proof, but accepts that he visited northwestern India near Taxila, was martyred there, and that his relics were later taken to Edessa in Turkey.

John of Monte Corvino, a member of the Societas Peregrinantium Pro Christo on his way to China, landed in Quilon in 1291 and ministered the Nestorian Christian community. The Venetian traveller Marco Polo who visited India in 1292 testified to the presence of a Christian community in Quilon.

=== Erection of the diocese its first bishop ===
Since the latter half of the 13th century, Quilon became the chief centre of Catholic missionary expeditions. Franciscan and Dominican Missionaries in the 13th and 14th centuries visited Quilon and their letters confirm the existence of a vibrant Nestorian Christian community in Quilon. The local adherents of Church of the East were later forcibly incorporated into the Catholic Church through the Synod of Diamper.

In 1329 Pope John XXII, from the Holy See then in Avignon (France), erected Quilon as the first Diocese in the whole of Indies as suffragan to the Archdiocese of Soltaniyeh in Persia through the decree "Romanus Pontifex" dated 9 August 1329 By a separate bull, "Venerabili Fratri Jordano", the same Pope, on 21 August 1329 appointed the French or Catalan Dominican friar Jordanus Catalani as the first Bishop of Quilon.

(Copies of the Orders and the related letters issued by Pope John XXII to Bishop Jordanus Catalani and to the diocese of Quilon are documented and preserved in the diocesan archives. Also reprinted in the Indian Church History Classics, Vol.I, The Nazranies, South Asia Research Assistance Services, Ed. Prof. George Menachery, Ollur, 1998.)

The ancient diocese of Quilon had extensive jurisdiction over modern nations of India, Pakistan, Afghanistan, Bangladesh, Burma and Sri Lanka.

Jordanus Catalani arrived in Surat in 1320. After his ministry in Gujarat he reached Quilon in 1323. He not only revived Christianity but also brought hundreds to the Christian fold. He might have come again to Quilon as the bishop in 1330 to build the church at Quilon, known as St. George of the Latins. George happened to be the patron saint of the Catalans, besides being popular among other Christian communities on the Malabar coast. His book "Mirabilia Descripta" is a rare work on plants, animals and the people of India and of other countries in Asia and this is an authoritative work on India dating 700 years back. This book is considered to be a landmark chronicle of its time written around 1327.

The first Latin Bishop of Quilon was received with great jubilation by the faithful of Quilon. And this Makes the St. George Church he build at Kollam a Cathedral, the first Cathedral church in India. He brought a message of good wishes from the Pope to the local rulers. As the first Latin bishop in India, he was also entrusted with the duty of spiritual nourishment of the Christian community in Calicut, Mangalore, Thane and Baruch (Gujarat). According to Portuguese sources, written more than two centuries later, he was martyred by Muslims in Bombay in 1336, as much as the four Franciscan friars that he had to bury, fifteen years before, in the very same place (one of them, Thomas of Tolentino, was beatified). In the year 1348 John De Marignoli, the Papal Legate to China on his way back to Rome sojourned here for 14 months. With the martyrdom of the first Latin Bishop, the See of Quilon remained vacant. There was a 'historic gap' with regard to ecclesiastical administration in India till the Portuguese landed here in 1498 AD.

It follows from the Friar Jordanus tradition that Catholicism – not just Christianity – is deep rooted in Quilon. It is now settled that Latin Catholicism was brought to Kerala in the early 14th century by this Catalan or Occitan speaking Dominican. It is now evident that while Bishop Jordanus introduced Latin Catholicism, the Portuguese popularized it. In the 1340s, an Italian friar called Marignolli called on Kollam and still found a Catholic church that he mentions as Saint George of the Latins, probably built by Jordanus (Saint George was popular among the Malabar Syrian Christians, but also happens to be the Patron Saint of Catalonia). The fact that Quilon is the founding seat of the Catholic Church in India is often found obscured in the midst of history.

=== Franciscan missionary activity ===
John De Marignolli (Giovanni de' Marignolli) of St. Lorenzo in Florence, joined the Franciscan order and was consecrated bishop in 1338 AD. He was chosen as legate to China by Pope Benedict XII (1334–1342). He preached in China and on his way back from China, he landed at Quilon and lived there for over a year, preaching in St. George's Church, which was founded by Jordanus.

In 1338 during the Pontificate of Pope Benedict XII (1334–1342) the great Khan of Peking in China sent a great delegation of ambassadors to the Pope at Avignon and were given a royal reception by the Pope. They requested the Pope to send a legate who would be wise, capable and virtuous to care for their souls. Responding to their request the Pope chose John De Marignolli as his legate to China and he accompanied the ambassadors of Great Khan on their homeward journey. Marignolli departed with a great number of friars and precious gifts for Khan, princes and sovereigns. They departed in March 1339 and after a long and perilous journey reached their destination, Khanbalique in 1342 and were received by the Great Khan, who was the last of the Mongol dynasty in China.

After three years of mission Marignolli decided to return to Europe. On his departure on 26 December 1345 he set out for Quilon where he arrived on 23 March 1346. The Christians of Quilon warmly welcomed him. He lived there for over a year, and preached in St. George's Church, founded by Jordanus.

He concentrated himself in the Latin Church of St. George founded by Bishop Jordanus. He preached in this Church and adorned the Church with paintings. He could not do much of missionary activity here since he became sick with dysentery during his stay at Quilon. When he recovered he visited Cape Comorin the extremity of Indian Peninsula where he erected a marble pillar mounted by a cross in full view of Ceylon. It seems that he was an ambitious man and was desirous that the good people of Quilon should never forget him and that was the intention of the erection of the marble pillar. The column, which was to endure till the world's end soon crumbled under the corroding influence of the elements and the inscriptions, were destroyed. Later a wrong tradition developed, attributing this column to St. Thomas. Marignolli set for Sumatra and Ceylon in July 1347. In September 1348 he came back to India. He left India in 1350 AD.

=== Portuguese control ===
The Portuguese missionaries made Quilon one of their most important centers of evangelization. Francis Xavier laboured here for several years. He established a seminary in Quilon, and his letters to Rome give testimony of a dynamic Christian community there.

The history of Quilon Diocese from the 16th century to the 20th century was linked to the battle of European empires for the control of the Malabar Coast. The Portuguese who arrived in Quilon in 1503 revived and strengthened the Christian community. They built several churches and monasteries and established new centers of Christianity. Quilon remained a territory under the Franciscans until 1533 AD, when the Diocese of Goa was established and Quilon became part of the new diocese. However, in the year 1557 AD, when Cochin was erected as a suffragan diocese of the Archdiocese of Goa, Quilon became part of Cochin Diocese.

The Portuguese tenure in Quilon has contributed much to its growth and development. Their primary concern was the abolition of the caste system. They made education available to all communities. They started presses, which made books available more cheaply, and thus people began to read and acquire knowledge. One of the oldest presses in India was established at Tangasseri. The press was attached to the San Salvador Seminary of the diocese established by a Jesuit Priest, Jao de Faria. The first book in Kerala, Doctrina Christa, was published from Quilon on 20 October 1578. The Harvard University library possesses a surviving copy of this book. It was printed in the neo-Tamil script of the time in Kerala. The one printed at Quilon, Doctrina Christs en Lingua Malabar Tamil, is a translation of Francis Xavier's work in Portuguese, translated by Henrique and Manual de San Pedro. The second page of the book mentions that it was printed on 20 October 1578 at the press of the "Saviour." Till today that place of the press is known in Tangasseri (near the Bishop's House) as "Achukuddom Parambu" (Press Place).

=== Suppression and reestablishment ===
In 1661 the Portuguese who tasted defeat from the Dutch, left Quilon. The Dutch who took control over Quilon, destroyed Catholic churches and persecuted Catholics. The Christians of Quilon went through a dark period till 1741. The Dutch, defeated by Marthandavarma, the King of Travancore, had to leave Quilon. Yet another dark period for the Church in Quilon was in 1808 when Velu Thampi Dalava unleashed a fierce persecution on Christians. The British accused him of having put to death three thousand native Christians, charged with no crime but their religion during the Travancore rebellion along with the brutal murder of a British Surgeon named Dr. Hume.

The Christian community of Quilon after remaining a long period without bishops became a part of the diocese of Goa in 1534, when Goa was made an Episcopal see, suffragan to Funchal in the Madeiras. When Goa was raised to an archbishopric on 4 February 1557, Cochin was made suffragan diocese to the Arch-diocese of Goa and Quilon became part of the Cochin diocese. Pope Gregory XVI created the Vicariate of Malabar by his bull Multa Praeclare of 24 April 1838 and suppressed the diocese of Cochin; and attached that territory along with Quilon to the Vicariate of Malabar (Verapoly). Later the Vicariate of Malabar was divided into three vicariates, Verapoly, Mangalore and Quilon by the Holy See on 12 May 1845. The apostolic vicariate of Quilon was extended from Arabian Sea to the 'Sahyan' Mountains and from Cape Comorin to Pamba River, which was provisionally entrusted to the Belgian discalced Carmelite missionaries.

The separation of Quilon, as a new Vicariate Apostolic, suffragan to Verapoly was decreed and was provisionally executed on 12 May 1845, entrusting it to the Belgian Carmelite Missionaries, and finally confirmed as a separate Vicariate Apostolic on 15 March 1853.

On 24 April 1838 the Holy See established the Vicariate of Malabar with headquarters at Verapoly and Quilon became part of the new vicariate. The separation of Quilon, as a new Vicariate Apostolic, suffragan to Verapoly was decreed and was provisionally executed on 12 May 1845, entrusting it to the Belgian Carmelite Missionaries, and finally confirmed as a separate Vicariate Apostolic on 15 March 1853. With the establishment of the Hierarchy in India, Quilon again became a Diocese on 1 September 1886 with jurisdiction over the territory from Cape Comerin to Pampa River, in the north.

This arrangement was effected in 1853, and on the establishment of the hierarchy in 1886 it was finally elevated into an episcopal see, suffragan to Verapoly.

== Parishes ==
=== Tangasseri Forane ===
Parish Church	Parish	Parish Priest	Assistant Parish Priests
St. George Church	Aravila	Fr. Lazar S Pattakadavu	
St. Joseph's Chapel, Valavilthoppe	Sakthikulangara	Fr. Rajesh Martin	Fr. Akhil B T
St. Peter's Church	Moothakara	Fr. Joseph Detto Fernandez	
Holy Family Church	Mukkad	Fr. John Paul C	Fr. Emmanuel Antony
Our Lady of Purification Church	Port Kollam	Fr. Franklin Francis	
St. John de Britto's Church	Sakthikulangara	Fr. Rajesh Martin	Fr. Akhil B T
Holy Cross Church	Tangasseri	Fr. Joseph Daniel	
Infant Jesus Cathedral	Tangasseri	Fr. Christopher Henry	
St. John the Baptist's Church	Thirumullavaram	Fr. Jolly Abraham	
St. Antony's Church	Vaddy	Fr. Jose Sebastian	Fr. John Samson
Our Lady of Assumption Church, Puthenthuruth	Sakthikulangara	Fr. Rajesh Martin	Fr. Akhil B T

=== Tuet Forane ===
Parish Church	Parish	Parish Priest	Assistant Parish Priests
Holy Family Church	Asramam	Msgr. Ferdinand Peter	
Viswa Rani Church	Ayathil	Fr. Joseph John	
St. Francis Xavier's Church	Chinnakada	Fr. Arun J Aradan	
St. John the Baptist's Church	Eravipuram	Fr. Benson Ben	Fr. Rijo Paul; Fr. Romario Jose
Bharatha Rajni Church	Pattathanam	Fr. Vinod Selastin	
St. Stephen's Church	Thope	Fr. Varghese Painadath	
St. Michael's Church	Thanni	Fr. Benet M V	
St. Sebastian's Church	Tuet	Fr. Leju Isaac	Fr. Aneesh Ansel

=== Kadavoor Forane ===
Parish Church	Parish	Parish Priest	Assistant Parish Priests
St. Elizabeth's Church	Aipuzha (Prakulam)	Fr. Joe Antony Alex	
Ashtajalarani Church	Ashtamudi	Fr. Saiju Simon	
St. Sebastian's Church	Chemmakkad	Fr. Isac Ouseph	
St. Antony's Church	Cherumood		
St. Mary's Church	Edachal		
St. Casmir's Church	Kadavoor	Fr. Anil Jose	
St. Thomas's Church	Kandachira	Fr. John Paul	
Little Flower Church	Kizhakkekara	Fr. George Rebeiro	
St. Joseph's Church	Kureepuzha	Fr. George Robbinson	
Holy Cross Church	Mangad	Fr. Binu Thomas	
Divine Hearts Chapel	Neeravil		
St. Joseph's Church	Perumon Mundackal	Fr. Libin C T	
Little Flower Church	Vellimon	Fr. Vimal kumar N	

=== Kottiyam Forane ===
Parish Church	Parish	Parish Priest	Assistant Parish Priests
St. Joseph's Church	Alummoodu		
St. Teresa of Avila Church	Chathanoor		
Sacred Heart Church	Kakkottumoola	Fr. Romance Antony	
Little Flower Church	Kalakode	Fr. Bibin J	
Our Lady of Dolourl's Church	Kannanalloor	Fr. Dixon Antony	
Nithyasahaya Matha Church	Kottiyam	Fr. Tomy Camance	
Good Shephered Church	Kureeppally	Fr. Shajan Varghese	
St. Jude Church	Kurumandal		
St. Jacob's Church	Mayyanad	Fr. Alphonse S	
St. George's Church	Mylakkad	Fr. Sanu Francis	
Christ the King Church	Parippally		
Karmalarani Church	Pazhangalam		
Holy Redeemer Church	Perumpuzha		
Immaculate Conception Church	Pullichira	Fr. Joyson Joseph	
St. Paul's Church	Thazhuthala		

=== Kanjiracode Forane ===
Parish Church	Parish	Parish Priest	Assistant Parish Priests
Blessed Virgin Mary's Church	Eruthanagad		
St. George's Church	Kaithakody	Fr. Bose A Fernandez	
St. Antony's Church	Kanjiracode	Fr. Rozario B J	Fr. Sony Charles
Carmel Giri Church	Karikuzhy	Fr. joy louis	
Mary Rani Church	Keralapuram	Fr. Pravees Mathias C. M.	
St. Francis Xavier's Church	Koduvila	Fr. Jijo Jose	Fr. Joby Philip
Christ the King Church	Kottappuram	Fr. Abhilash gregory	
St. Michael's Church	Kumbalam	Fr. Mary John	
St. Joseph's Church	Mandrothuruthu		
St. Rita's Church	Nanthirickal	Fr. rijo paul	
St. Joseph's Church	Padappakkara	Fr. Francis John	
St. Antony's Church	Thekkemuri		

=== Neendakara Forane ===
Parish Church	Parish	Parish Priest	Assistant Parish Priests
St. Sebastian's Church	Azheekal	Fr. Prasanth George	
St. George's Church	Clappana	Fr. Xavier Lazar	
St. Francis Assisi Church	Karithura	Fr. Paul Antony	
St. Josephs Church	Kochuthuruthu	Fr. Filson Francis	
St. Andrew's Church	Kovilthottam	Dr. Milton G	Dr. Francis Prem Henry
Velamkanni Matha Church	Kulangarabhagam	Dr. Augustin Saviour	
Three King's Church	Maruthoorkulangara		
St. Sebastian's Church	Neendakara	Dr. Rolden Jacob	
Sreyas	Pannackalthuruthu		
Three King's Church	Vadakkumthala	Fr. Saju Vincent	

=== Chavara Forane ===
Parish Church	Parish	Parish Priest	Assistant Parish Priests
St. George's Church	Arinalloor	Fr. Dixon	
St. Antony's Church	Koivila	Dr. Francis George	
Church of Our Lady of Lourdes	Lourdepuram	Fr. Bibin C T	
St. Mary's Church	Mariapuram	Fr. Jaison Joseph	
St. Andrew's Church	Pattakadavu	Fr. Manoj Antony F	
St. Francis Xavier's Church	Pavumba	Fr. Joseph S Kadavil	
Our Lady of Assumption Church	Perungalam		Fr. Tomy Thomas
St. Sebastian's Church	Rajagiri	Fr. Jaison Joseph	
St. Thomas Church	Sasthamkotta	Fr. Biju	
St. Augustine's Church	Thalamukil		
St. Joseph's Church	Thekkumbhagam	Fr. George Sebastian	
St. Jerome's Church	Vadakkumbhagom	Fr. Regison Richard	

=== Mavelikkara Forane ===
Parish Church	Parish	Parish Priest	Assistant Parish Priests
Our Lady of Fathima Church	Chennithala		
St. Mary's Church	Cherukole	Fr. Shani C F	
St. Michael's Church	Ennakkad		
St. Antony's Church	Eramathur		
St. Sebastian's Church	Kallikkad		
St. Joseph's Church	Kallumpuram		
Holy Family Church	Karichal	Fr. Lenin Leon	
Sagaramatha Church	Karuvatta		
St. Antony's Church	Kayamkulam	Fr. Sepherin K B	
St. Joseph's Church	Krishnapuram		
Holy Family Church	Kuttamperoor		
St. Joseph's Church	Muthukulam	Fr. Prince S	
Christ the King Church	Muttam		
St. Joseph's Church	Pallippad		
St. Francis Xavier's Church	Parumala	Fr. Nidhin Francy	
St. Peter's Church	Pavukkara	Fr. Joy Louis Fernandez	
St. Anne's Church	Ulunthy	Fr. Saiju George	
St. Sebastian's Church	Valiaperumpuzha	Fr. Sajan Walter	
St. Thomas Church	Vempuzha	Fr. Prince S	

== List of bishops ==
Latin Rite

- Jordanus Catalani (1329–1336)
- Bernardino Baccinelli of St. Teresa, (pro-vicar Apostolic, 1845–1853)
- Bernardino Pontanova of St. Agnes (1853)
- Maurice of St. Albert (1854)
- Charles Hyacinth Valerga (1854–1864)
- Ephrem-Edouard-Lucien-Théoponte Garrelon (20 June 1868 - 3 June 1870)
- Ferdinand Maria Ossi (23 September 1883 - 16 August 1905)
- Aloysius Maria Benziger (16 August 1905 - 23 July 1931)
- Vincent Victor Dereere (10 February 1936 - 1 July 1937)
- Jerome Maria Fernandez (25 September 1937 - 30 January 1978)
- Joseph Gabriel Fernandez (30 January 1978 - 16 October 2001)
- Stanley Roman (16 October 2001 - 18 April 2018)

== Saints and causes for canonisation ==
- Servant of God Aloysius Maria Benziger
- Servant of God Jerome Maria Fernandez

== Ministries ==
Ministry	Commission	Director
Faith Formation Ministry	Commission for Bible	Fr. Linson K Aradan
Faith Formation Ministry	Commission for Liturgy	Bishop of Quilon
Faith Formation Ministry	Commission for Catechetics	Fr. Linson K Aradan
Faith Formation Ministry	Commission for Vocations, Seminary & Clergy	Fr. Zion Alfred
Faith Formation Ministry	Commission for Religious	Vicar General
Faith Formation Ministry	Commission for Proclamation	Fr. Arun J Aradan
Faith Formation Ministry	Commission for Ecumenism	Fr. Abhilash Gregory
Faith Formation Ministry	Commission for Dialogue	Fr. Joe Antony Alex
Faith Formation Ministry	Commission for Theology & Doctrine	Fr. Rolden Jose Jacob
Faith Formation Ministry	Commission for Canon Law	Fr. Christopher Henry
Family Ministry	Commission for family	Fr. Shajan Varghese
Family Ministry	Commission for children	Fr. Joe Antony Alex
Social Ministry	Commission for Justice, Peace & Development	Fr. Baiju Julian
Social Ministry	Commission for Labour	Fr. Jijo Jose
Social Ministry	Commission for Health	Fr. John Britto
Social Ministry	Commission for Migrants	Fr. Jose Puthenveedu
Social Ministry	Commission for Temperance	Fr. Milton George
Education Ministry	Commission for Education	Fr. Manoj Antony
Education Ministry	KCSL ( Kerala Catholic Students League )	Fr. Jijo Jose
Education Ministry	Commission for Media	Fr. Libin C T
Education Ministry	Commission for Heritage	Fr. George Robinson
Youth Ministry	Jesus Youth	Fr. Sanu Francis
Youth Ministry	KCYM ( Kerala Catholic Youth Movement )	Fr. Joe Antony Alex
Laity Ministry	KLCA ( Kerala Latin Catholic Association )	Fr. George Sebastian
Laity Ministry	Commission for Women	Fr. Jolly Abraham
Laity Ministry	DCMS ( Dalit Catholic Mahajana Sabha )	Fr. Jolly Abraham
Laity Ministry	PMO ( Pontifical Mission Organisation)	Fr. Arun J Aradan
Laity Ministry	Jesus Fraternity	Fr. Jinson Earnest
Laity Ministry	Vincent De Paul	Fr. Silvy Antony
Laity Ministry	Legion of Mary	Fr. Baiju Julian
Laity Ministry	Confraternity	Fr. Jolly Abraham
Laity Ministry	Holy Childhood	Fr. Rijo Paul
Laity Ministry	CLC ( Christian Living Communities )	Fr. Francis John
Laity Ministry	Family Unit	Fr. Jose Sebastian
