= Stanley Roman =

21st-century Indian Catholic bishop

His Excellency, The Right Reverend Dr. Stanley Roman
- Bishop Emeritus of Quilon
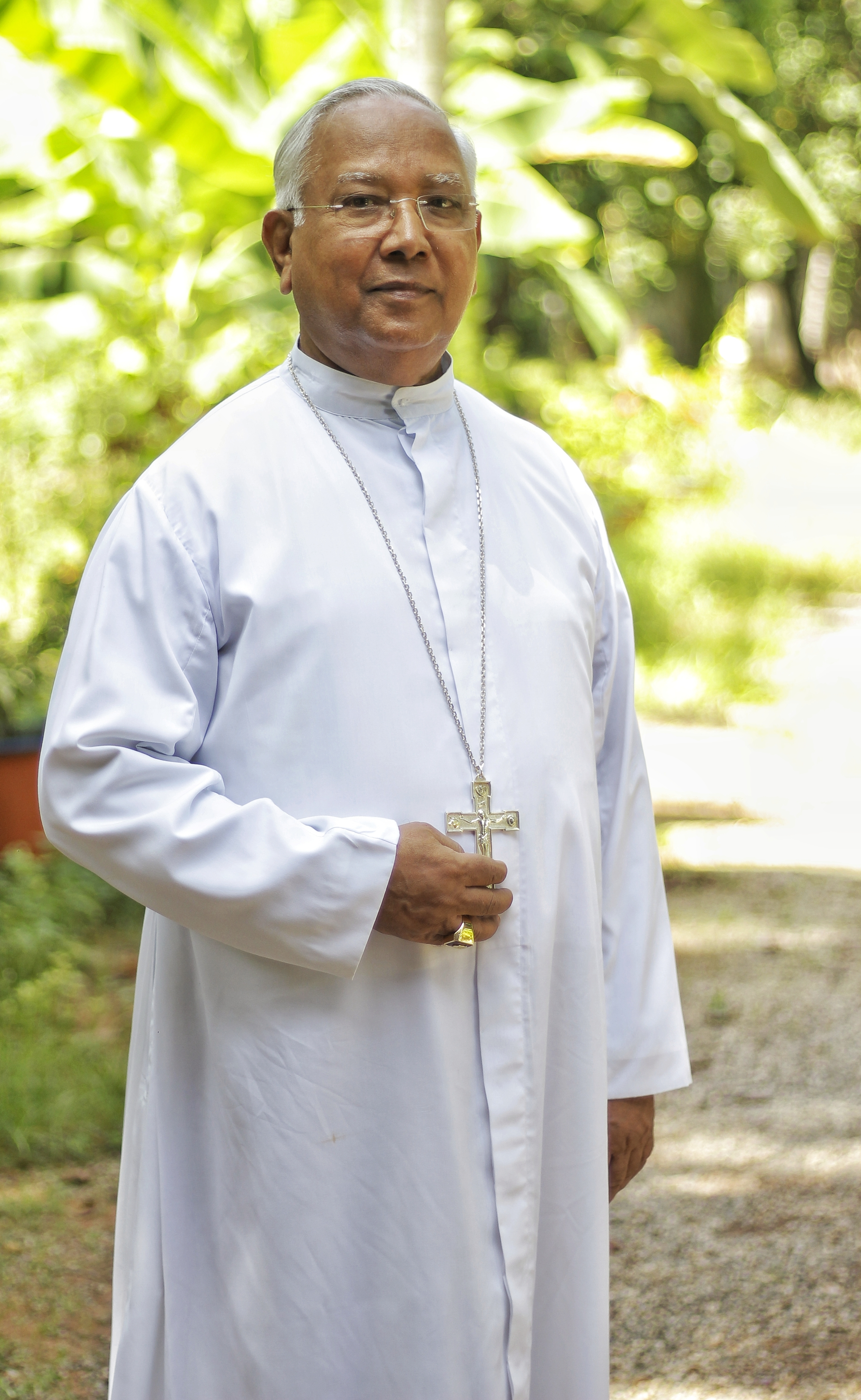
- Church: Catholic Church
- Diocese: Quilon
- Appointed: 29 October 2001
- Retired: 18 April 2018
- Predecessor: Joseph Gabriel Fernandez
- Successor: Paul Antony Mullassery
- Previous posts: Chairman - KCBC Education Commission; Chairman - KRLCC Education Commission; Chairman - KRLCC Women's Commission; Rector - Carmel Giri Major Seminary; Principal - Fatima Mata National College

Orders
- Ordination: 16 December 1966 by Gregorio Pietro Cardinal Agagianian
- Consecration: 16 December 2001 by Rt. Rev. Dr. Joseph Gabriel Fernandez

Personal details
- Born: 4 June 1941 (age 85) Punalur Kollam Kerala India
- Denomination: Roman Catholic
- Parents: Mr. Roman Fernandez; Mrs. Elizabeth Fernandez
- Education: Pontifical Urban University, Rome
- Motto: To serve in holiness and justice

Styles of Stanley Roman
- Reference style: His Excellency; The Right Reverend
- Spoken style: Your Excellency
- Religious style: Bishop

Stanley Roman (born 4 June 1941) is an Indian prelate of the Catholic Church. He was Bishop of Quilon, India, from 2001 to 2018. He also chaired the education committee of the Kerala Catholic Bishops' Council.

== Biography ==
Stanley Roman was born on 4 June 1941 at Punalur in Kollam district. He is the 10th of the eleven children of Roman Fernandez and Elizabeth (7 boys and 4 girls).

After Roman's primary education at St. John's L.P. School and Government U.P. School, Akkara at Punalur, he joined St. Raphael's Minor Seminary at Kollam, where he was later to be vice rector, for religious studies and simultaneously completed his schooling from St. Aloysius School, Kollam.

In 1959, Roman commenced philosophy studies at St. Joseph's Pontifical Seminary, Aluva. After 2 years, he was chosen to pursue priestly studies at the Pontifical Urban University, Rome, where he received a master's degree in Philosophy and Theology. He was ordained priest by Cardinal Agagiani, the Prefect of the Congregation for the Evangelization of Peoples at St. Peter's Basilica, Rome on 16 December 1966.

When Roman returned to Kollam, he was initially appointed as the prefect of St. Raphael's Seminary. Along with his ministry he took his time to learn the Indian musical instrument "Veena", despite his deep knowledge of Western Music. He continued his studies and received a Master of Arts in English language and literature from the University of Kerala. He then joined Fatima Mata National College, Kollam as an English instructor and the bursar, and later became its principal. After holding various posts in the diocese, he was appointed the first rector of Carmel Giri Major Seminary, Latin rite, when St. Joseph's Pontifical Seminary was re-organized on the basis of rites.

Roman was appointed as the 13th Bishop of Quilon on 29 October 2001, while he was serving as the rector of Carmelgiri Seminary. Roman was ordained on 16 December 2001. In 2004, Roman founded the Pradhibhodayam education program, for scholastically gifted, but financially challenged members of the diocese. In 2007, Roman inaugurated Jagat Jyoti Mandir (House of the Light of the Universe), which is a Christian church incorporating Hindu cultural elements.

Pope Francis accepted his resignation on 18 April 2018.
