= Joseph Gabriel Fernandez =

Indian priest (1925–2023)

His Excellency, The Right Reverend Joseph Gabriel Fernandez
- Bishop Emeritus of Quilon
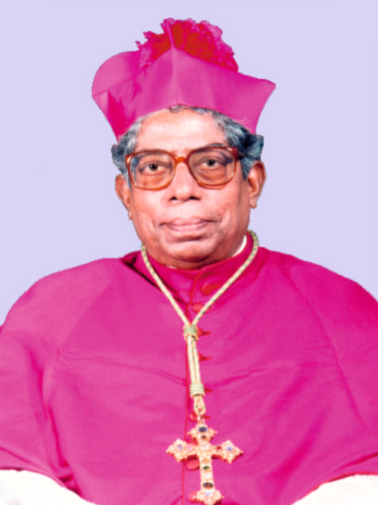
- Metropolis: Trivandrum
- Diocese: Quilon
- Appointed: 30 January 1978
- Term ended: 16 October 2001
- Predecessor: Jerome Maria Fernandez
- Successor: Stanley Roman

Orders
- Ordination: 19 March 1949
- Consecration: 14 May 1978 by Jerome Maria Fernandez

Personal details
- Born: 16 September 1925 Maruthurkulangara, British Raj
- Died: 4 March 2023 (aged 97)
- Buried: Infant Jesus Cathedral
- Denomination: Roman Catholic

Styles of Joseph Gabriel Fernandez
- Reference style: His Excellency; The Right Reverend
- Spoken style: Your Excellency
- Religious style: Bishop
- Posthumous style: None

Joseph Gabriel Fernandez (16 September 1925 – 4 March 2023) was an Indian Roman Catholic prelate and the emeritus bishop of Quilon.

Fernandez died whilst undergoing treatment for pneumonia on 4 March 2023, at the age of 97.

Catholic Church titles
Preceded by Jerome M. Fernandez	Bishop of Quilon; 1978–2001	Succeeded by Stanley Roman
