= KCBC =

Radio station in Manteca, California

- Manteca, California; United States
- Broadcast area: Northern California
- Frequency: 770 kHz (HD Radio)

Programming
- Format: Christian radio

Ownership
- Owner: Crawford Broadcasting Company; (Kiertron, Inc.)

History
- First air date: April 5, 1987
- Former call signs: KPLA (1987–1993)
- Call sign meaning: Crawford Broadcasting Company

Technical information
- Licensing authority: FCC
- Facility ID: 34587
- Class: B
- Power: 50,000 watts (day); 4,100 watts (night)
- Transmitter coordinates: 37°47′50.7″N 120°53′4.8″W
- Translator: 94.7 K234CV (Modesto)

Links
- Public license information: Public file; LMS
- Webcast: Listen live
- Website: 770kcbc.com

KCBC (770 AM) is a commercial radio station broadcasting a Christian format, licensed to Manteca, California, United States, with studios and offices in Oakdale. The station is owned by the Crawford Broadcasting Company with the license held by subsidiary Kiertron, Inc.

Programming is also heard over low-power FM translator K234CV (94.7 FM) in Modesto.

== History ==
On April 5, 1987, the station first signed on the air. Its original city of license was Riverbank, California, and its first call sign was KPLA. It was owned by the KPLA Partnership, airing a Christian format. The studios and offices were in Oakdale, as they are now.

KPLA had a talk radio format from 1991 until 1993. It is the former home to conservative talk show host Geoff Metcalf. It later changed its city of license to Manteca, returning to Christian radio when acquired by Crawford Broadcasting.
