= Perayam, Thiruvananthapuram =

Perayam, Palode, Thiruvananthapuram
- Town
- Country: India
- State: Kerala
- District: Thiruvananthapuram

Languages
  - Official: Malayalam, English
- Time zone: UTC+5:30 (IST)
- PIN: 695562
- Telephone code: 0472
- Vehicle registration: KL21

Perayam is a village located near Palode in Thiruvananthapuram District of Kerala State of south India.

== Location ==
The hamlet is located about 35 Kilometres away from Thiruvananthapuram City. The village is located in Nedumangad Taluk. Nedumangad Town is about 15 km away from Perayam. Chellanchy, Panavoor, Anakulam, Thannimood, Nanniyode, Palode are some nearby places from Perayam.
