= Kollam district =

Kollam district Quilon district
- District
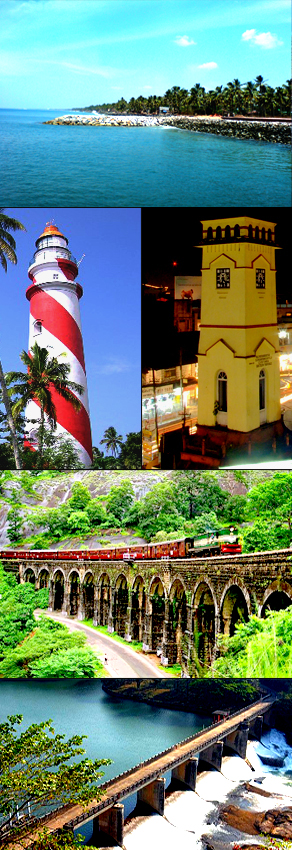
- From top: Paravur estuary, Light house and clock tower in Kollam city, 13 Ring bridge of Thenmala, Check dam across Kallada river
- Nickname: Cashew capital of the world
- Location in Kerala
- Interactive map of Kollam district
- Coordinates: 8.8°N 76.6°E
- Country: India
- State: Kerala
- Revenue divisions: 2: Kollam Revenue Division; Punalur Revenue Division
- Taluks: 6: Kollam; Karunagappally; Kunnathur; Kottarakkara; Punalur; Pathanapuram
- Established: 1956
- Headquarters: Kollam

Government
  - Collector: Devidas.N IAS
  - City Police Commissioner: Aswathy Jiji IPS
  - District Police Chief Kollam Rural SP: Vishnu pratheep IPS

Area
  - Total: 2,491 km^{2} (962 sq mi)
  - Rank: 8th

Population (2011)
  - Total: 2,635,375
  - Density: 1,058/km^{2} (2,740/sq mi)

Languages
  - Official: Malayalam, English
- Time zone: UTC+5:30 (IST)
- Postal code: 691XXX
- Vehicle registration: KL-02 Kollam; KL-23 Karunagappally; KL-24 Kottarakkara; KL-25 Punalur; KL-61 Kunnathur; KL-80 Pathanapuram; KL-82 Chadayamangalam
- HDI (2005): ▲0.787 ( High)
- Sex ratio: 1113 ♂/♀
- Local governments: 85: 1 Municipal Corporation: Kollam; 4 Municipalities: Paravur, Punalur, Karunagappally, Kottarakkara; 68 Grama Panchayats; 11 Block Panchayats; 1 District Panchayat
- Literacy: 93.77%
- Website: www.kollam.gov.in, www.kollam.nic.in

Kollam district (Malayalam: [kolːɐm]) (formerly known as Quilon district) is one of 14 districts of the state of Kerala, India. The district has a cross-section of Kerala's natural attributes; it is endowed with a long coastline, a major Laccadive Sea seaport and an inland lake (Ashtamudi Lake). The district has many water bodies. Kallada River is one among them, and land on the east bank of the river is East Kallada and that on the west bank is West Kallada. The district headquarters is Kollam.

== Etymology ==
In 825 CE, the Malayalam calendar, or Kollavarsham, was created in Kollam at meetings held in the city. The present Malayalam calendar is said to have begun with the re-founding of the town, which was rebuilt after its destruction by fire.

The city was known as Koolam in Arabic, Coulão in Portuguese, and Desinganadu in ancient Tamil literature.

== Overview ==
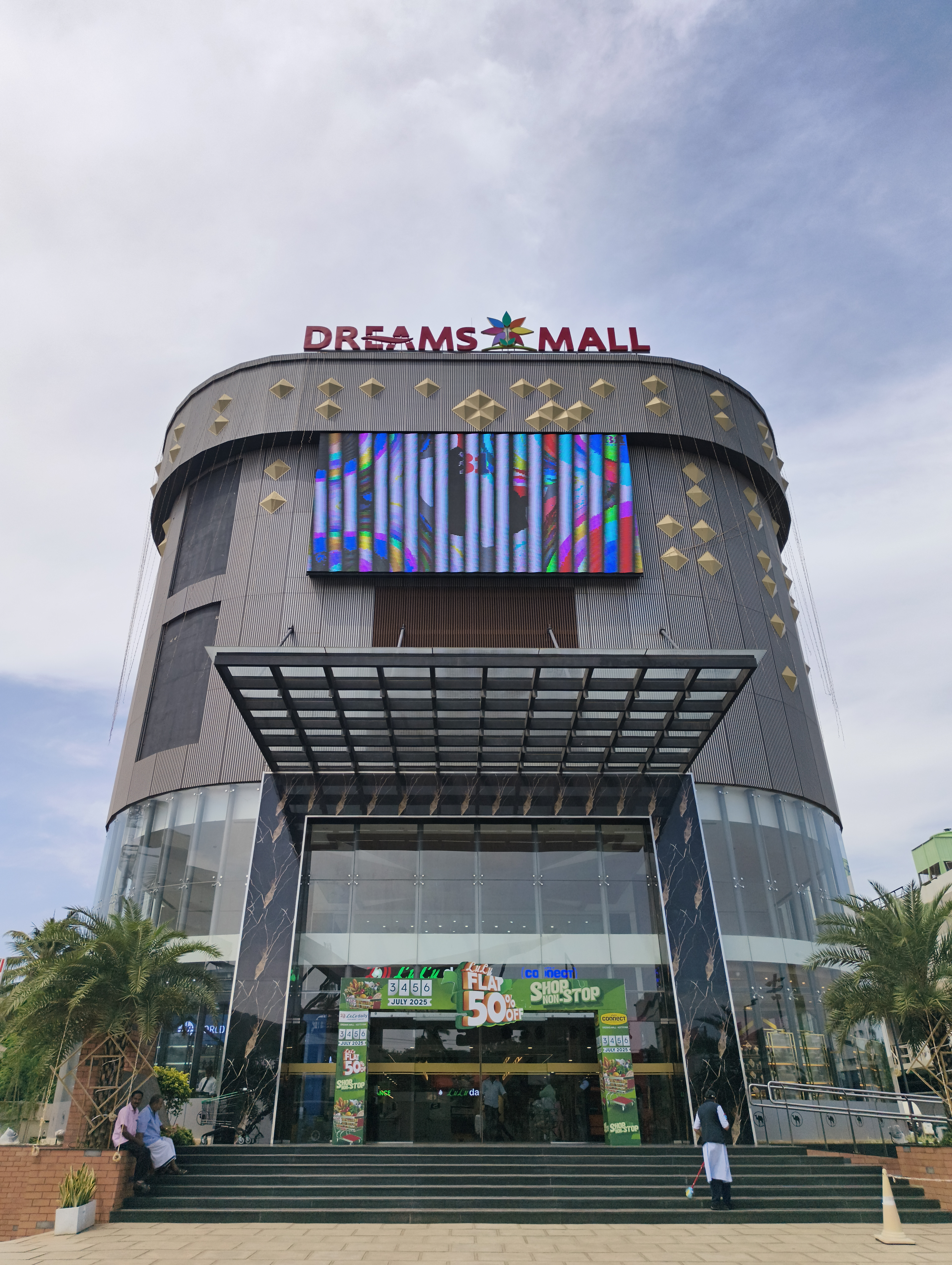
Dreams Mall (Lulu Hyper Market), Kottiyam in Kollam District

Kallada Boat race is one of the famous festival events of the district. Even though it is a competition between two land sides of the river, many boat clubs from various places, even beyond the district participate in the event. Kollam is known as the capital of Kerala's cashew industry. Plains, mountains, lakes, lagoons, and backwaters, forests, farmland and rivers make up the topography of the district. The area had trading relationships with Phoenicia and Ancient Rome.

== Climate ==
Kollam

Climate chart (precipitation, max. and min. temperature)
J	F	M	A	M	J	J	A	S	O	N	D
24 32 22	31 33 23	78 33 24	160 33 25	247 33 25	459 30 24	409 30 23	259 30 23	211 31 24	333 31 24	231 31 23	65 32 23
- █ Average max. and min. temperatures in °C
- █ Precipitation totals in mm
- Source: Govt. of Kerala
Imperial conversion
J	F	M	A	M	J	J	A	S	O	N	D
1 90 72	1.2 91 73	3.1 91 75	6.3 91 77	9.7 91 77	18 86 75	16 86 73	10 86 73	8.3 88 75	13 88 75	9.1 88 73	2.6 90 73
- █ Average max. and min. temperatures in °F
- █ Precipitation totals in inches

Kollam's temperature is almost steady throughout the year. The average temperature ranges from 25 to 32 degrees Celsius. Summer usually runs from March until May; the monsoon begins by June and ends by September. Kollam receives an annual average rainfall of around 2,700 millimetres (110 in).

It receives both southwest and northeast monsoons. Winter is from November to February; the temperature is moderately cool, ranging from 18 to 25 degrees Celsius.

Climate data for Kollam (Quilon)
Month	Jan	Feb	Mar	Apr	May	Jun	Jul	Aug	Sep	Oct	Nov	Dec	Year
Mean daily maximum °C (°F)	32 (90)	33 (91)	33 (91)	33 (91)	33 (91)	30 (86)	30 (86)	30 (86)	31 (88)	31 (88)	31 (88)	32 (90)	33 (91)
Mean daily minimum °C (°F)	22 (72)	23 (73)	24 (75)	25 (77)	25 (77)	24 (75)	23 (73)	23 (73)	24 (75)	24 (75)	23 (73)	23 (73)	22 (72)
Average precipitation mm (inches)	24.4 (0.96)	30.9 (1.22)	77.7 (3.06)	159.5 (6.28)	246.9 (9.72)	458.8 (18.06)	408.9 (16.10)	258.9 (10.19)	211.2 (8.31)	332.5 (13.09)	230.8 (9.09)	65.4 (2.57)	2,700 (106.30)
Source 1:
Source 2:

== Demographics ==
Historical population
Year	Pop.	±% p.a.
1901	406,013	—
1911	465,684	+1.38%
1921	552,333	+1.72%
1931	698,041	+2.37%
1941	856,585	+2.07%
1951	1,110,362	+2.63%
1961	1,461,103	+2.78%
1971	1,839,265	+2.33%
1981	2,175,339	+1.69%
1991	2,407,566	+1.02%
2001	2,585,208	+0.71%
2011	2,635,375	+0.19%

According to the 2011 census Kollam district has a population of 2,635,375, roughly equal to the nation of Kuwait or the US state of Nevada. This gives it a ranking of 155th in India (out of a total of 640 districts). The district has a population density of 1,056 inhabitants per square kilometre (2,740/sq mi) . Its population growth rate over the decade 2001-2011 was 1.72 percent. Kollam has a sex ratio of 1113 females for every 1000 males. The total literacy rate of Kollam district was 94.09%. The male literacy rate was 96.09% and the female literacy rate was 92.31% in Kollam district. 45.05% of the population lives in urban areas. Scheduled Castes and Scheduled Tribes make up 12.46% and 0.41% of the population respectively.

Malayalam is the predominant language, spoken by 99.10% of the population. Small minorities of Tamil speakers live in Koovakkad village and bordering areas

=== Urban structure ===
The Kollam Urban Agglomeration (UA) is the 6th most populous UA in the state. Kollam is placed 49th in the list of most populous urban agglomerations in India. The total urban population of the entire district is 1,187,158. The metropolitan area of Kollam includes Adichanalloor, Adinad, Ayanivelikulangara, Chavara, Elampalloor, Eravipuram (part), Karunagappally, Kollam, Kundara, Kulasekharapuram, Mayyanad, Meenad, Nedumpana, Neendakara, Oachira, Panayam, Panmana, Paravur, Perinad, Poothakkulam, Thazhuthala, Thodiyoor, Thrikkadavoor, Thrikkaruva, Thrikkovilvattom, and Vadakkumthala.

=== Religion ===
Religions in Kollam district (2011)
Religion	Percent
Hinduism	64.42%
Islam	19.30%
Christianity	16.00%
Other or not stated	0.28%

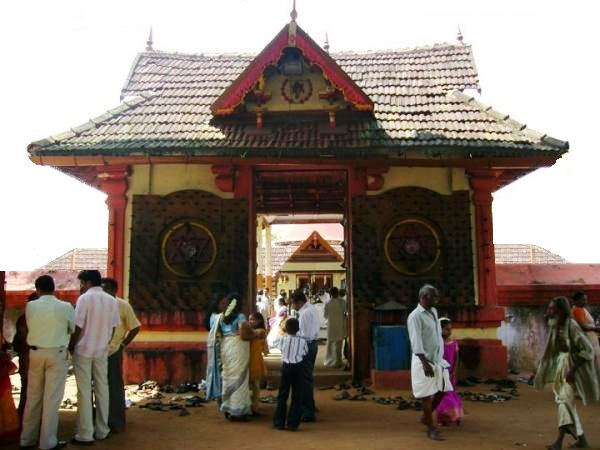
Anandavalleeshwaram Sri Mahadevar Temple in Kollam

Hinduism (64.42%) is practised by majority of the people in Kollam district of which Nair (32%) and Ezhava (30.5%) are the largest sub groups. Islam (19.3%) is the second largest religion. Kollam is the only district in Southern Kerala where Muslims outnumber Christians. Despite this Kollam has a significant Christian population too (16%) among this the Latin Catholics (38.5%), Malankara Orthodox (Note: Includes both the Malankara Orthodox Syrian Church and Malankara Jacobite Syrian Church.) (36.1%) and Marthoma Church (15.8%) form the majority.

Percentage distribution of Castes, Denominations, and Sects in Hindu, Christian, and Muslim population of the District respectively(average 2008-2014)
Hindu Castes	Percentage	Christian Denominations	Percentage	Muslim Sects	Percentage
Nair	32			Sunni	100
Ezhava	30.5	Syro-Malankara Catholics	4.3		
Brahmin	2	Latin Catholics	38.5		
Nadar	0.4				
Viswakarma	7.7	Malankara Orthodox	36.1		
Schedule Caste	16.9	Mar Thoma	15.8		
Schedule Tribe	2.1	Dalit Christians	1.3		
Others	8.4	Others	4.0		
TOTAL	100%		100%		100%

== Largest cities & towns ==
Largest cities or towns in Kollam district of Kerala (Indian state)
Rank		Taluk	Pop.
1	Kollam*	Kollam	397,419
2	Karunagappally	Karunagappally	49,604
3	Punalur	Punalur	46,702
4	Chavara	Karunagappally	42,655
5	Mayyanad	Kollam	40,039
6	Paravur	Kollam	37,245
7	Kundara	Kollam	33,959
8	Kottarakkara	Kottarakkara	29,788
9	Ochira	Karunagappally	28,412
10	Chathannoor	Kollam	28,029

*In 2015, the area of Kollam municipal corporation increased by merging Thrikkadavoor panchayat *The area of Karunagapally municipality has expanded by merging Ayanivelikulangara village.

== Administration ==
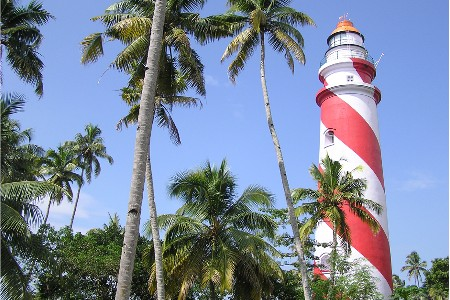
Lighthouse, Thangasseri, Kollam

The history of the district's administration can be traced back to 1835, when the Travancore state consisted of two revenue divisions with headquarters at Kollam and Kottayam. When Travancore and Cochin were combined into Travancore-Cochin, Kollam was one of the three revenue divisions. When the state of Kerala was formed in 1957, half portion of Chenkotta taluk was merged with the state of Madras. Later in 1957, the Cherthala, Ambalapuzha, Mavelikara, Karthikapalli, Chengannur and Thiruvalla taluks (formerly in Kollam district) were united to form the new district of Alappuzha. In 1983, Pathanamthitta taluk and Adoor taluk and seven villages of Kunnathur taluk were removed from Kollam district to form the new Pathanamthitta district.

=== Revenue Divisions (RDO) ===
Administratively Kollam District is composed of two Revenue Divisions, viz Kollam and Punalur with three Taluks each under them.

1) Kollam
- Kollam taluk
- Karunagapally taluk
- Kunnathur taluk

2) Punalur

- Punalur taluk
- Pathanapuram taluk
- Kottarakkara taluk

=== Taluks ===
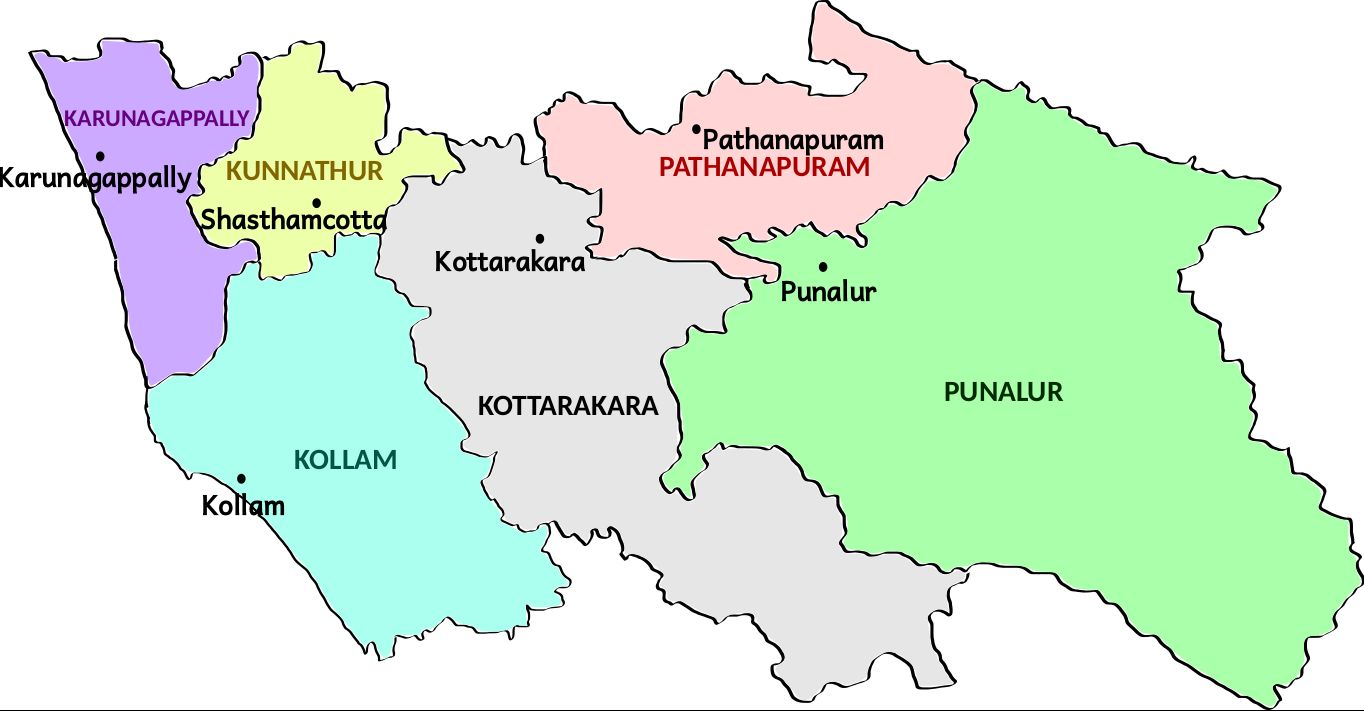
Talukwise map of Kollam district

Kollam is administratively divided into 6 taluks. They are Kollam, Karunagappally, Kunnathur, Kottarakkara, Punalur and Pathanapuram, which are subdivided into 104 villages. The tahsildar is the revenue official in charge of each taluk.

Taluk	Headquarters
Kollam Taluk	Kollam
Karunagappally Taluk	Karunagappally
Kunnathur Taluk	Sasthamkotta
Kottarakkara Taluk	Kottarakkara
Punalur Taluk	Punalur
Pathanapuram Taluk	Pathanapuram

=== Police administration ===
Police administration in Kollam is divided into two districts: urban and rural. The City Police is headed by a City Police Commissioner, an IPS (Indian Police Service) officer with the rank of SP; its headquarters is at Kollam. The rural police is headed by the Rural Superintendent of Police (SP), with its headquarters at Kottarakkara. Both heads report to the Deputy Inspector General of Police (DIGP), Thiruvananthapuram Range (Kerala).

The Kollam City Police is divided into three subdivisions, each under an Assistant Commissioner of Police (ACP): Karunagappally, Kollam and Chathannoor. Each subdivision is divided into circles, headed by the Circle Inspector of Police. Each circle is divided into a number of police stations, headed by a Sub-Inspector of Police. The Kollam Rural Police District is divided into two subdivisions, each under an Assistant Superintendent of Police (ASP)/ Deputy Superintendent of Police (DySP): Kottarakkara and Punalur. There are a total of 29 police stations, in 13 circles. Kollam city traffic is controlled by the City Traffic Police, with a Traffic Police Station located near the Asramam Ground. Kerala's first coastal police station was established in Neendakara, Kollam.

The first police museum in India-The Sardar Vallabhbhai Patel Police Museum has a large collection of police artefacts and rare photographs. The museum has a room dedicated to officers martyred in the line of duty. The forensic section has a large collection of photographs. The museum is located at the Kollam East Police Station.

== Local Governments ==
=== Panchayats ===
Kollam district has 68 grama panchayats (village-level panchayats) as part of its rural local self-government structure. Along with these, the district also has 11 block panchayats and one district panchayat. Each of these panchayats is governed by an elected council, headed by a President and Vice-President.

=== Municipalities ===
Corporations & Municipalities in Kollam district

There are four municipalities in Kollam District. Punalur, Paravur, Karunagappally and Kottarakkara are the municipalities. There is a long-standing demand for upgrading Pathanapuram & Anchal panchayaths into municipal status.

== Elected representatives ==
=== Assembly representatives ===
District	No.	Constituency	Name	Party	Alliance	Remarks
Kollam	116	Karunagapally	C. R. Mahesh	INC	UDF	
Kollam	117	Chavara	Shibu Baby John	RSP	UDF	Minister of Forests & Widlife Protection
Kollam	118	Kunnathur (SC)	Ullas Kovoor	RSP	UDF	
Kollam	119	Kottarakkara	K. N. Balagopal	CPI(M)	LDF	
Kollam	120	Pathanapuram	Jyothi Kumar Chamakkala	INC	UDF	
Kollam	121	Punalur	C. Ajayaprasad	CPI	LDF	
Kollam	122	Chadayamangalam	M. M. Naseer	INC	UDF	
Kollam	123	Kundara	P. C. Vishnunadh	INC	UDF	Minister of Tourism, Culture & Cinema
Kollam	124	Kollam	Bindu Krishna	INC	UDF	Minister of Labour, Dairy Development, Women & Child Development & Animal Husbandry
Kollam	125	Eravipuram	Vishnu Mohan	RSP	UDF	
Kollam	126	Chathannoor	B. B. Gopakumar	BJP	NDA	BJP parliamentary party leader of Kerala.

=== Lok Sabha constituencies ===
Kollam district has three Lok Sabha (lower house) constituencies. They include the Chavara, Kundara, Eravipuram, Kollam, Chathannoor, Chadayamangalam and Punalur assembly constituencies. While the Kunnathur, Kottarakkara and Pathanapuram constituencies are in the Mavelikara Lok Sabha constituency, the Karunagapally assembly constituency is in the Alappuzha Lok Sabha constituency.

== Transportation ==
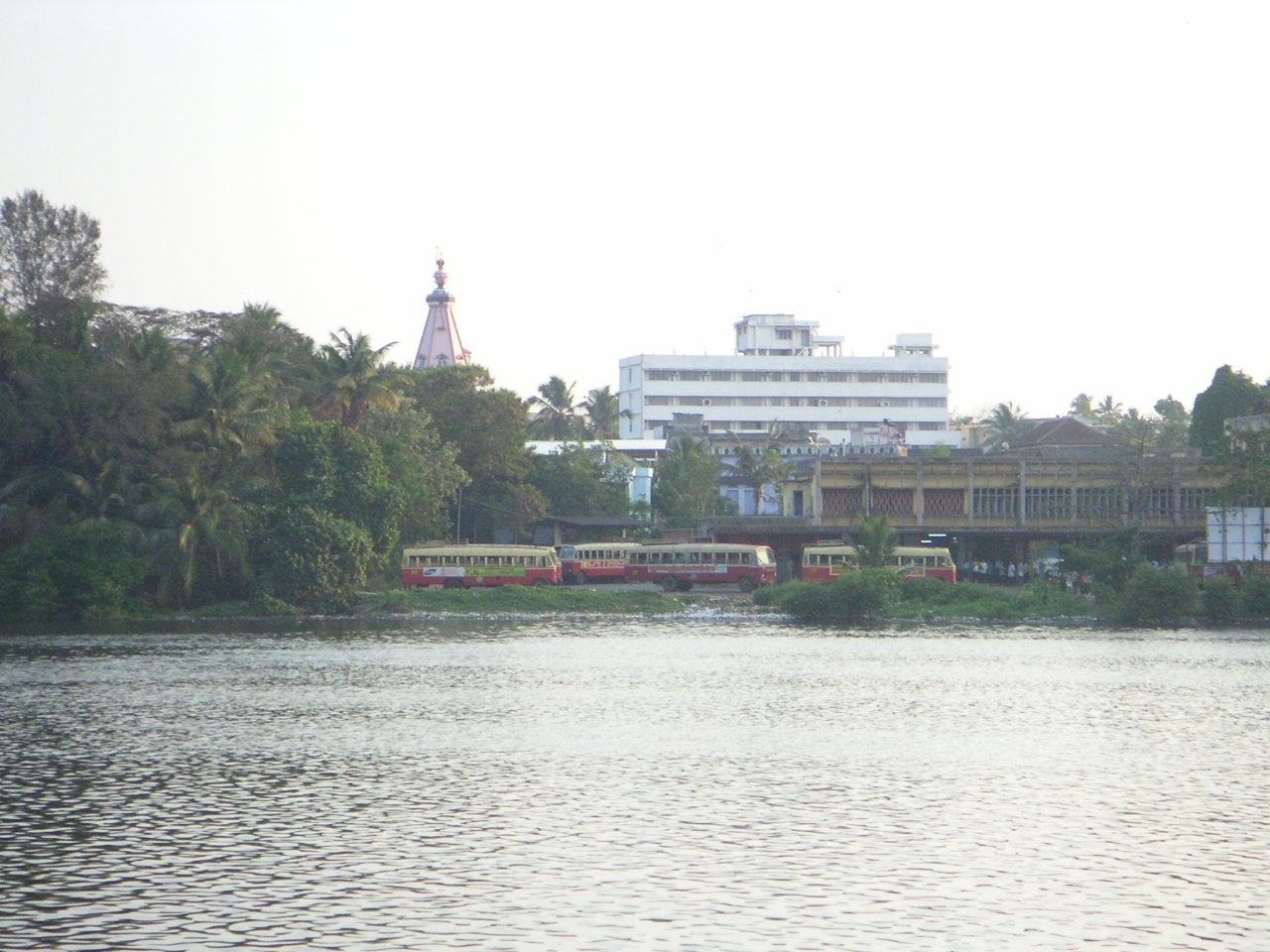
View of Kollam KSRTC Bus Station from Ashtamudi Lake

=== Road ===
Kollam is connected by bus and train service. It is also connected to neighbouring states by bus service operated by the Kerala State Road Transport Corporation (KSRTC) and Indian Railways. These are the KSRTC Depots & Sub Depots & Operating Centres (OC) in the district:

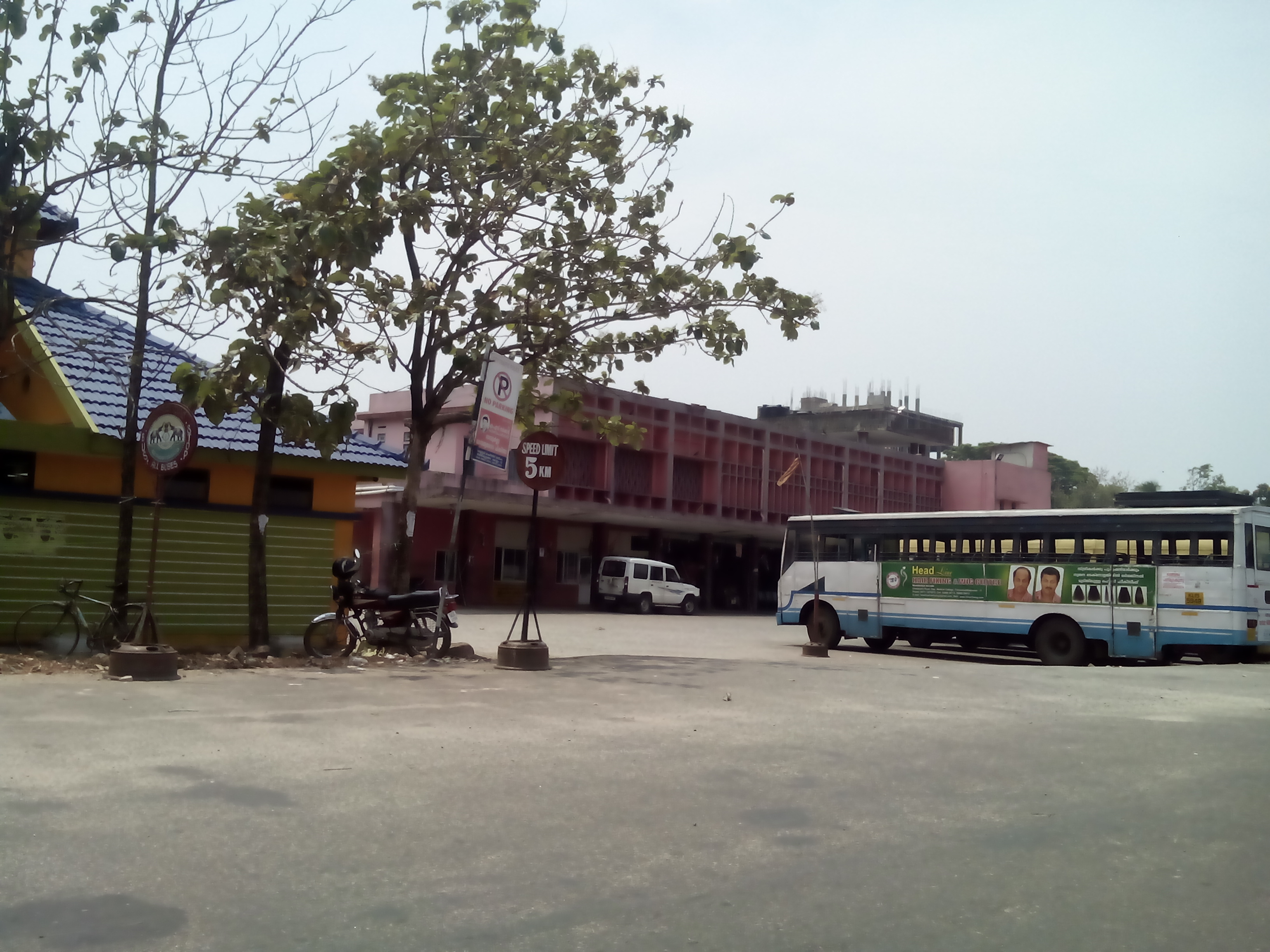
Kollam KSRTC Bus Station

- Kollam
- Chathannoor
- Karunagappally
- Ochira
- Punalur
- Kottarakkara
- Chadayamangalam
- Pathanapuram
- Sasthamkotta
- Aryankavu (OS)
- Kulathupuzha (OS)

The district is connected to other parts of Kerala and India through the National Highways – NH 66 (earlier NH 47), NH 183 (earlier NH 220), NH 744 (earlier NH 208). The state highway - Main Central Road (MC Road) and Punalur-Pathanamthitta-Muvattupuzha Main Eastern Highway — connects Kollam with other districts. Intrastate road transportation is served by the KSRTC, Tamil Nadu State Transport and Karnataka State Transport Companies. KSRTC Interstate bus service operates from the Kollam and Kottarakkara KSRTC bus stations. Kollam zone of KSRTC is now the second most revenue generating zone in Kerala.

=== Rail ===
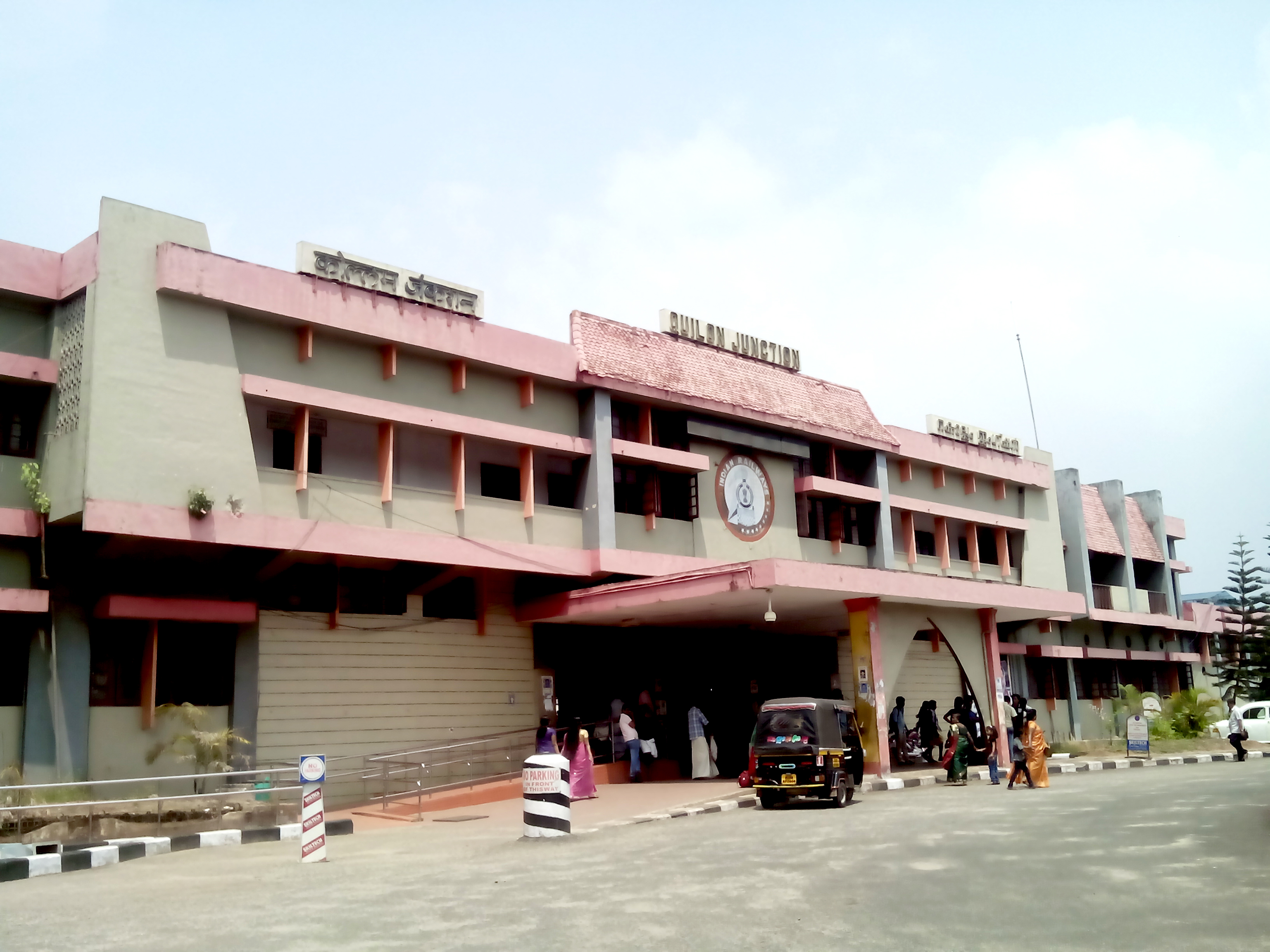
Entrance of Kollam Junction railway station

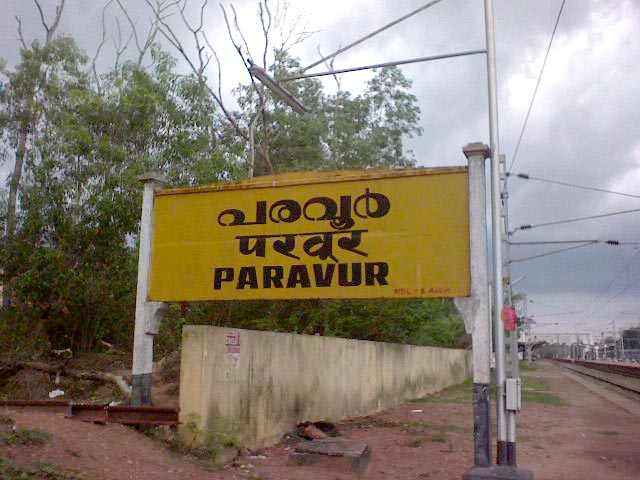
Paravur railway station

Kollam Junction railway station (QLN) is the one and only rail head in the district. A total of 128 short & long-distance services (including weekly) and 10 services of MEMU are running through Kollam Junction railway station. A most modern MEMU maintenance shed is working in the railway station premises of Kollam city. In addition to that, there are some other major railway stations in the district namely Punalur (PUU), Karunagappalli (KPY), Paravur (PVU), Sasthamkotta (STKT), Kottarakara (KKZ) and Kundara (KUV). The district has a good railway network, with 25 stations and about 132 kilometres (82 mi) of track. Kollam district boasts the record of having most numbers of railway stations in the state.

Railway stations in Kollam District
Ochira	Karunagapalli	Sasthamkotta
Munrothuruthu	Perinad	Kollam Junction
Eravipuram	Mayyanad	Paravur
Kilikollur	Chandanathoppe	Kundara
Kundara East	Ezhukone	Kottarakkara
Kuri	Avaneeswaram	Punalur
Edamon	Ottakkal	Thenmala
Kazhuthurutty	Edappalayam	Aryankavu

Trains from here connect the city of Kollam to major cities of India, including New Delhi, Bangalore, Chennai, Indore, Bhopal, Hyderabad, Thiruvananthapuram, Mumbai, Madurai, Vizag, Jammu, Howrah, Guwahati, Madgaon, Itarsi, Hubli, Ahmedabad, Kanyakumari, Gwalior, Nagpur, Pune, Kota, Bhubaneswar, Gorakhpur, Kochi, Kozhikode, Amritsar, Vijayawada, Coimbatore, Chandigarh and Mangalore. There are also passenger services running in Kollam–Thiruvananthapuram, Kollam–Ernakulam and Kollam–Punalur routes.

=== Water ===
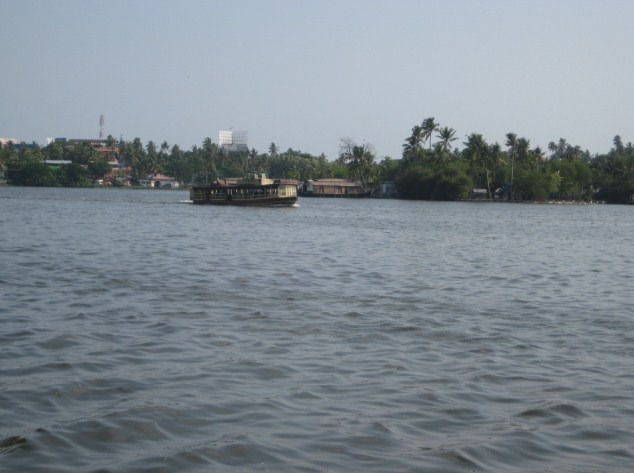
Kollam-Dalavapuram boat service

The district is having a fairly good network of waterways. The State Water Transport Department operates boat services to West Kallada, Munroe Island and Alappuzha. Double decker luxury boats run between Kollam and Allepey daily. Luxury boats, operated by Government and private owners, operate from the main boat jetty during the tourist season. The west coast canal system, which starts from Thiruvananthapuram in the south and ends at Kanhangad in the north, passes through Paravur, the city of Kollam and Karunagappally taluk. The Thiruvananthapuram-Shornur canal, which forms a part of the Thiruvananthapuram-Hosdurg system, runs a distance of about 62 km. The other canal systems include the Paravur Kayal, Kollam Canal and Chavara canal. The waterways are popular attractions and scenic tourist destinations in the area. The Kerala State Water Transport Department (KSWTD) has an operating centre near the KSRTC bus stand. Tourists may hire motorised country boats and houseboats with amenities (Kettavulam in Malayalam) to cruise along the waterways.

== Cashew industry ==
The cashew industry is centralised in this district. Kollam is approved by the central government as a "centre of cashew industry". Most workers in this industry are women; among them, a majority comes from the poorer sections of the society. There are several cashew-processing units in the district. The Kerala State Cashew Development Corporation Ltd., a Government of Kerala undertaking, has its headquarters in Kollam and serves as a model agency for the cashew-processing industry. The corporation has 30 cashew factories and employs more than 20,000 workers. Another government organisation in this field is CAPEX, which is part of the cooperative sector and has 10 cashew factories. Coir production, handloom industry, clay and wood-based industries contribute to the industrial health of the region.

== Forests and wildlife ==
According to the Government of Kerala estimates 81,438 hectares (314.43 sq mi) of land is under forest cover, mainly in the eastern portion of the district (including the Thenmala, Punalur, and a portion of the Achencoil forest divisions). The Thenmala Range, Aryankavu Range, and Shendurney Wildlife Sanctuary comprise the Thenmala division and the Achencoil, Kallar, and Kanayar Ranges make up the Achencoil division. The Pathanapuram and Anchal Ranges constitute the Punalur division.

The Shendurney Wildlife Sanctuary, 66 kilometres (41 mi) from Kollam, is situated on the southern part of the Western Ghats (8°50' and 8°55'N; 77°5'and 77°15'E) in the Punalur taluk of the district. The name "Shenduruny" is derived from the name of a tree species locally called "Shenkuruny" or "Chenkuruny" (Gluta travancorica), a tree mainly found in this area. An artificial lake of about 26 square kilometres (10 sq mi) has developed following the construction of a dam across the Kallada River. Remnants of Stone Age culture from a large cave situated at the northwestern part of the Shenduruny River were excavated from this sanctuary. These remains belong to the Mesolithic period.

This tropical rain forest has a wide variety of wildlife, and some endangered species are found here. Species found in the sanctuary include tiger, bonnet and lion-tailed macaques, Nilgiri langur, gaur (or Indian bison), sambar deer, muntjac (or barking deer), Indian spotted chevrotain (or mouse deer), wild boar, Indian elephant and different species of squirrels, such as the Indian giant and Indian palm squirrels.

== Fishing ==
The western portion of Kollam is bordered by the Laccadive Sea. Kollam's coastline is 37.3 kilometres (23.2 mi), 6.3 percent of Kerala's total coastline. Neendakara and Sakthikulangara are important fishing villages. There are an estimated 26 villages whose livelihood depends entirely on fishing. Cheriazheekkal, Alappad, Pandarathuruthu, Puthenthura, Neendakara, Thangasseri, Eravipuram and Paravoor are among the prominent fishing villages. One-third of Kerala's fish production (including 60 percent of its prawn catch) is contributed by Kollam, whose average fish production is estimated at 5,275 tonnes. Nearly 3,000 mechanised boats operate out of its fishing harbour.

== Tourism ==
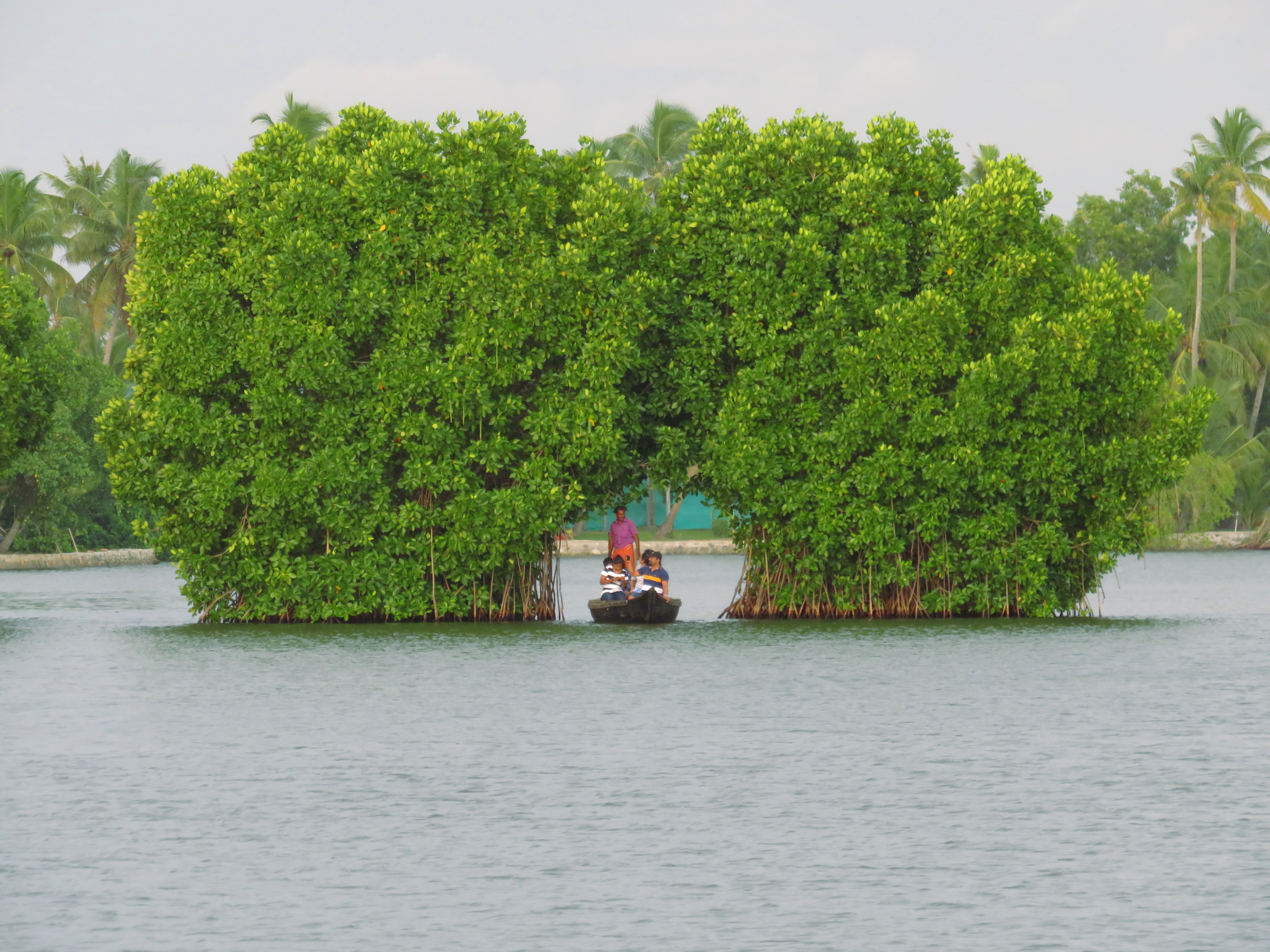
Tourism in Munroe Island

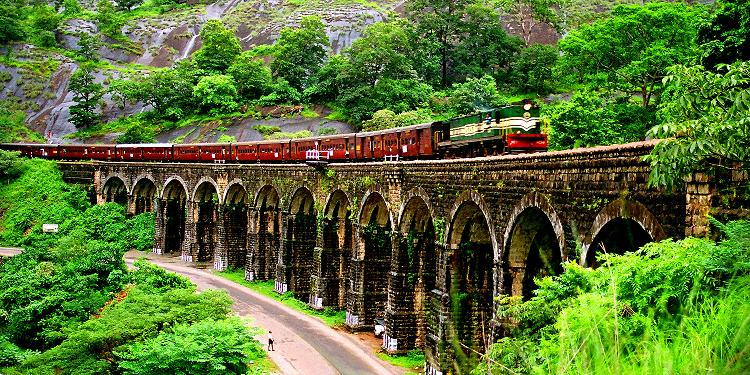
Thirteen-ring bridge, Punalur

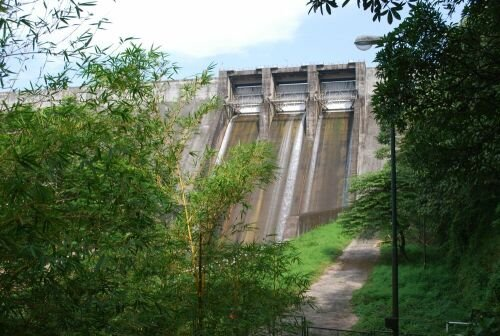
Thenmala Dam

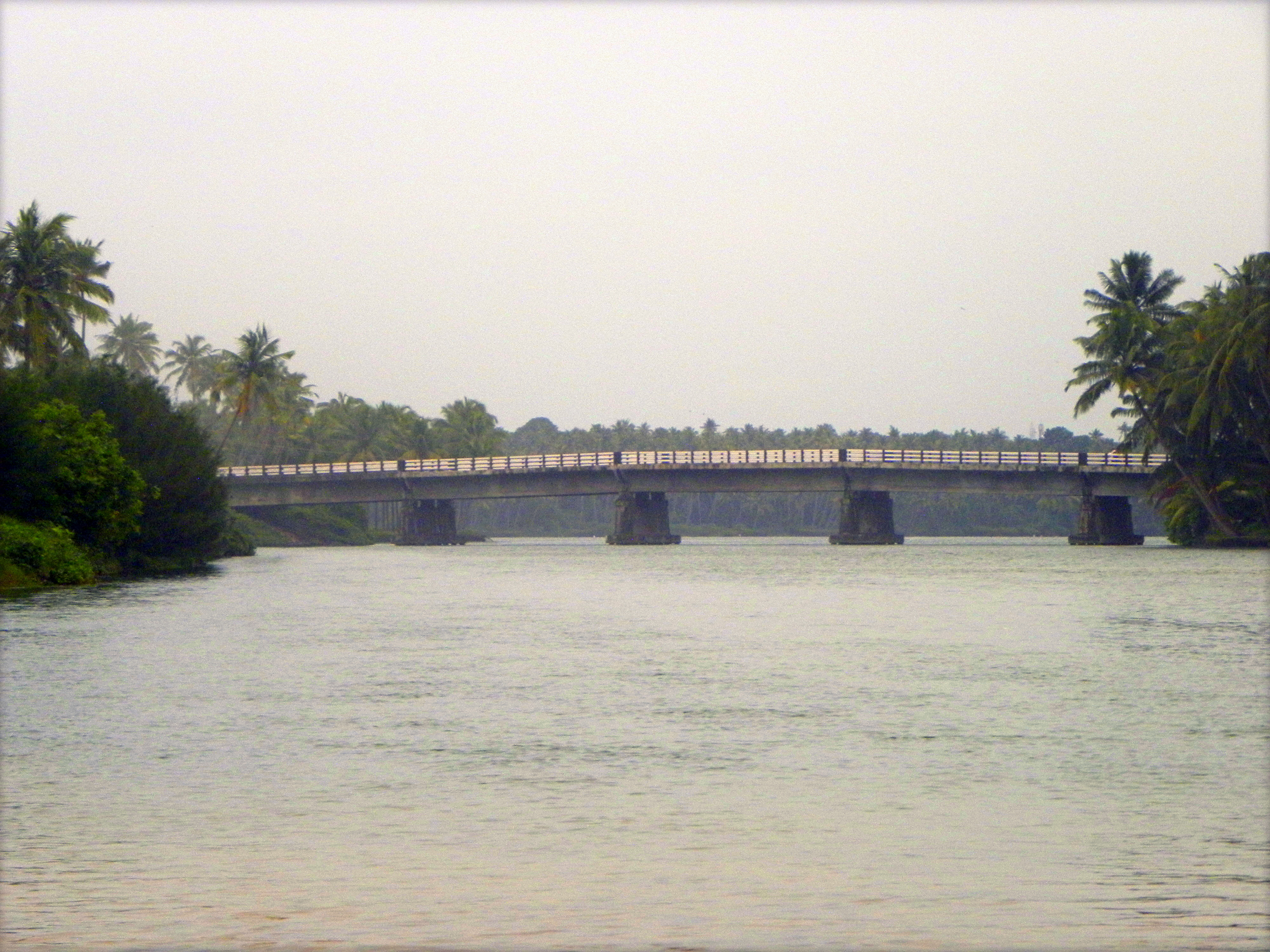
Thekkumbhagam bridge, Paravur

Jadayu earth centre, Palaruvi Falls, Thenmala (forests and reservoir), the Agasthyamalai Biosphere Reserve, Ashtamudi (backwater) and beaches at Kollam, Thirumullavaram and Thangassery are scenic areas.

Ashramam Tourist Village is a well-known tourist destination in Kollam city; the tourist village is located on the banks of Ashtamudi Lake. Ashramam is a hub of tourism activities in Kollam, and the District Tourism Promotion Councils (DTPC) office is located within the village.

The Asramam Maidan (Ashramam ground), adjacent to the tourist village, is the largest open space within a Kerala municipal corporation. It is used for events, sports, as a helipad, for Kollam Pooram and by driving schools. It covers over 60 acres (24 ha) in an oval.

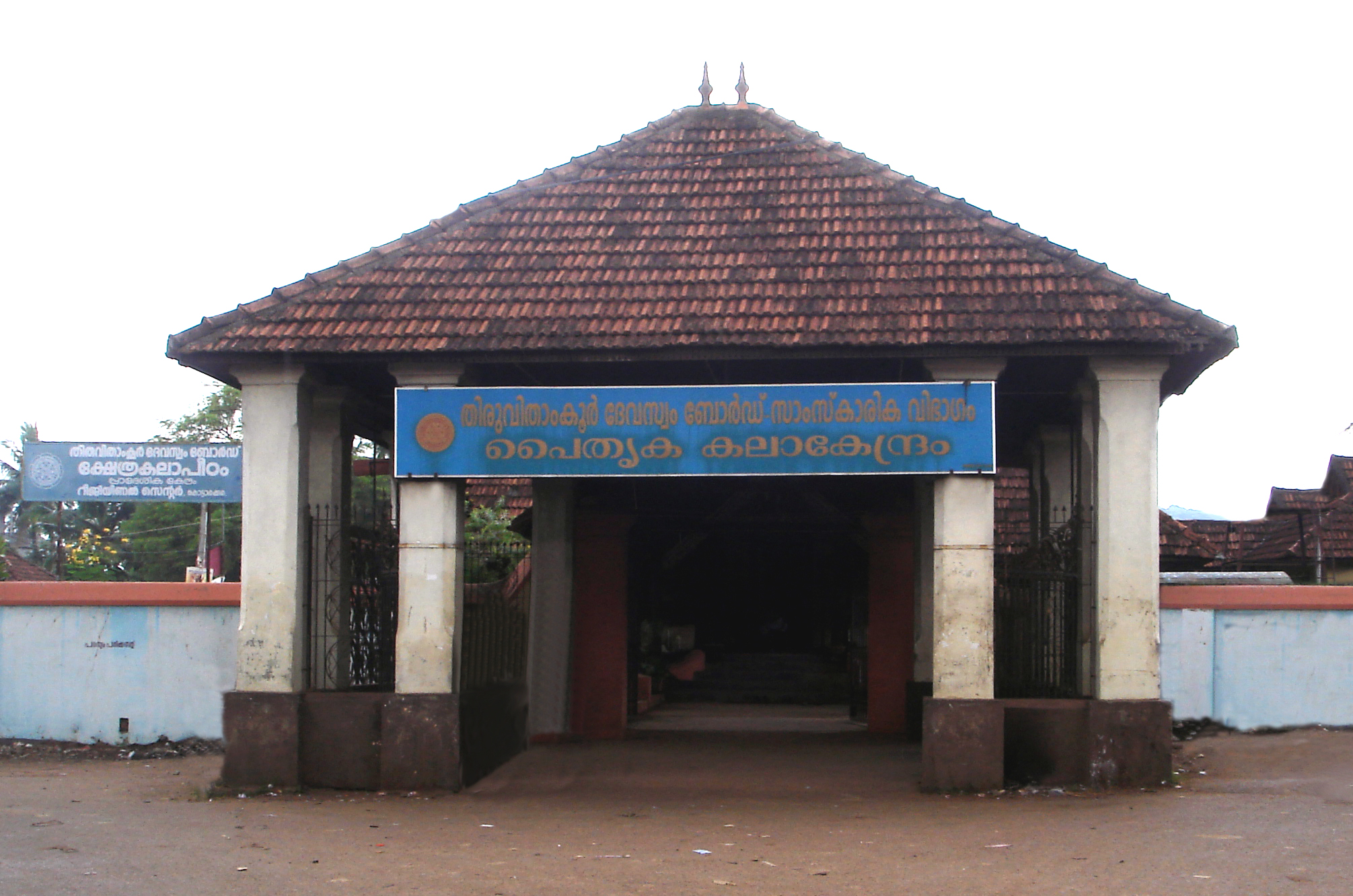
Kottarakkara Palace

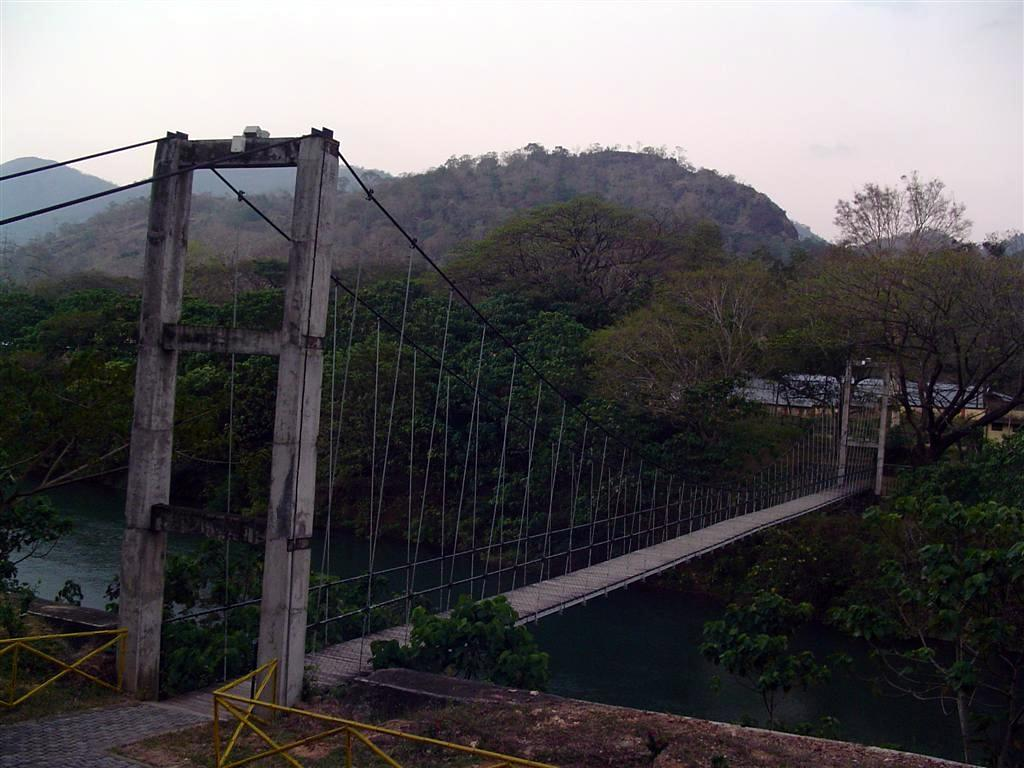
Suspension bridge at Thenmala

The first community tourism program in the state is being established on the Munroethuruth islands. Backwater tourism is an activity enjoyed in Kollam; Ashtamudi Lake, Paravur, Munroe Island, and Alumkadavu are the main backwater destinations. Accommodation is in resorts and on houseboats.

Thenmala, located 66 kilometres (41 mi) east of Kollam, is the first ecotourism project in India and run by the Thenmala Ecotourism Promotion Society.

Kollam was the seat of the Desinganad kings. Kottarakara is well known as the place where a new version of the classical dance form of Kathakali was conceived. It was also the capital of the Elayidath Swaroopam. Kundara is known for the 1812 proclamation against the British by Velu Thampi Dalawa.

Alappad village, located on the seashore, was impacted by the 2004 Indian Ocean earthquake and tsunami. Varkala Beach (also known as Papanasham) is 26 kilometres (16 mi) south of Kollam. The Duriyodana Temple is in Kunnathur Taluk. The Sakthikulangara Dharma Sastha Temple-Sree Ayyappa Swamy Temple is known for its Utsavam in the month of Makaram (between mid-January and mid-February).

Polachira, in Chirakkara Gramapanchayat, is a sightseeing destination. The Anathavalam is near here where one can see domestic elephants, touch and ride them. Mannathippara is at Polachira, 4 kilometres (2.5 mi) south of Chathannoor. Sasthamcotta Lake, about 19 kilometres (12 mi) from Kollam, is the largest freshwater lake in Kerala and a domestic tourist destination.

Jetayu Para, a large boulder, is located in Chadayamangalam; it is named for a mythical character in the Ramayana. It is believed that Jatayu fell here, after his failed attempt to stop Ravana.

Kulathupuzha Forest Museum, a forestry museum in Kulathupuzha, is the first and largest forest museum in Kerala. Kerala Forest Minister A. K. Saseendran inaugurated the museum and opened to public in August 18, 2023.

== See also ==
- Alumpeedika
- Asramam Maidan
- Educational Institutions in Kollam District
- Fatima Mata National College
- Karunagappalli railway station
- Kollam
- Kollam Beach
- Kollam Junction Railway Station
- Kollam MEMU Shed
- Kollam pooram
- Kollam Port
- Kureeppally
- List of Hindu temples in Kerala
- List of Sree Narayana Institutions
- Malumel
- Nadakkal
- Paravur Kayal
- Paravur
- Paravur Railway Station
- President's Trophy Boat Race
- Protected areas of Kerala
- Punalur
- Punalur Railway Station
- Punalur Suspension Bridge
- Roman Catholic Diocese of Quilon
- Thazhathu Kulakkada
- University of Kerala
- Valacode
