= Cutchery =

Cutchery Taluk Cutchery
- Neighbourhood
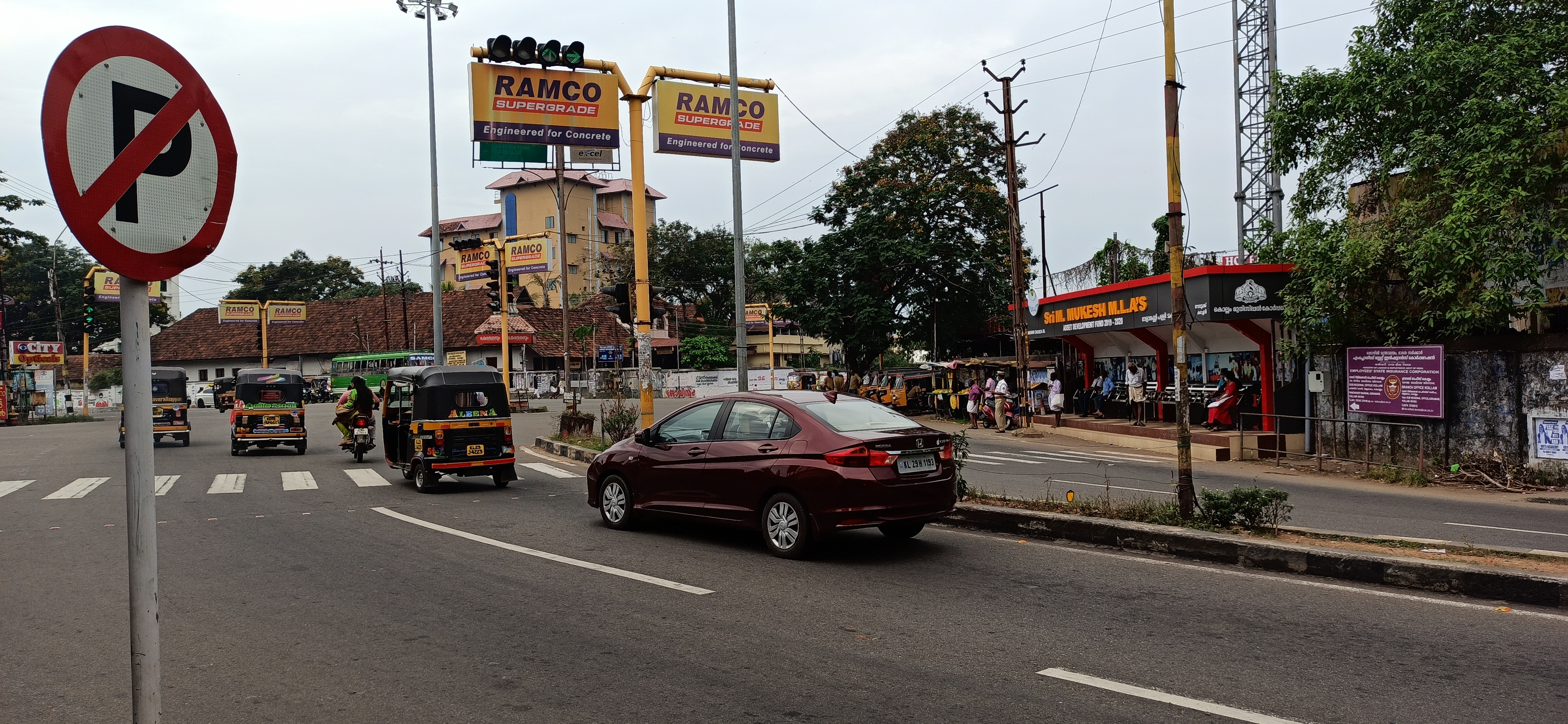
- Taluk Cutchery Junction

- Location in Kollam, India Cutchery (Kerala) Cutchery (India)
- Coordinates: 8.889989°N 76.584362°E
- Country: India
- State: Kerala
- City: Kollam

Government
  - Body: Kollam Municipal Corporation(KMC)

Languages
  - Official: Malayalam, English
- Time zone: UTC+5:30 (IST)
- PIN: 691013
- Vehicle registration: KL-02
- Lok Sabha constituency: Kollam
- Civic agency: Kollam Municipal Corporation
- Avg. summer temperature: 34 °C (93 °F)
- Avg. winter temperature: 22 °C (72 °F)
- Website: http://www.kollam.nic.in

Cutchery or Taluk Cutchery or Taluk Kacheri is a neighbourhood of the city of Kollam. It is the 49th ward in Kollam Municipal Corporation. The place got the name Cutchery from a similar word in Malayalam: കച്ചേരി which means office/court. Kollam Taluk office is situated at Cutchery.

== Importance ==
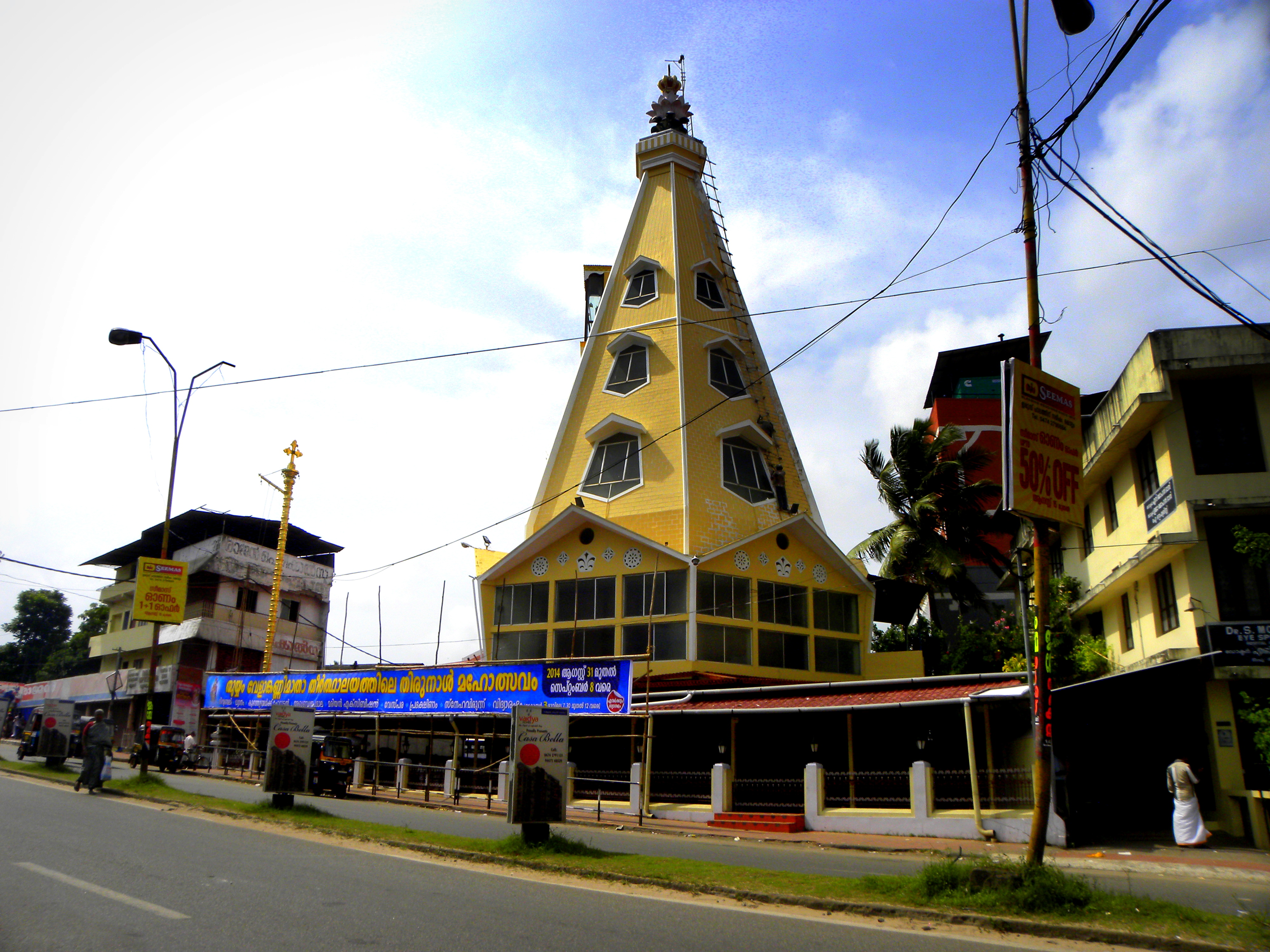
Our Lady of Velankanni Shrine in Kacheri

The place Cutchery got this name because of the presence of Kollam Taluk office situated at this place. A multi-level new Taluk office complex is under construction here. Cutchery is under the Central Zone-II of Kollam city corporation. The headquarters of Kollam Taluk is situated at Cutchery. Historic Iron Bridge in Kollam city is situated at Cutchery. Cutchery junction is an important road junction connecting the present National Highway-66 with Downtown road and Asramam Link Road. Kollam District Hospital, Kollam KSRTC Bus Station and garage are very close to Cutchery. Our Lady of Velankanni Shrine is situated at Cutcehry. A good number of residential apartments and hotels are there in Cutchery. Famous Mahatma Gandhi Peace Foundation is situated at Cutchery in Kollam city.

=== Cutchery: An emerging transport hub of Kollam ===
Cutchery junction (Taluk office junction/Taluk Kacheri junction) is an emerging transport hub of Kollam city as the place is the meeting point of Kerala State Water Transport Department's boat yard and Kerala State Road Transport Corporation's only bus station in the city. Taluk Kacheri junction has been included into the city's junction improvements project along with Chinnakada junction. Kollam Municipal Corporation has a plan to improve the road from Kappalandi Mukku (near Polayathode) – Taluk Kacheri junction via Asramam as one among the 3 inner ring roads in the city. As per the research report done by CRISIL for Draft City Development Plan of Kollam-2041, the passenger car equivalent (pce/pcu) in Taluk Kacheri junction during peak hours is 6,366 which is highest in the city and its average per day value is 53,522. The road section from Taluk office junction to High School junction in Kollam city is over-utilized to the extent of 311% of its capacity. As per the National Transportation Planning and Research Centre (NATPAC), Taluk office junction is one of the most accident-prone areas in Kollam city. To avoid the traffic woes in Cutchery junction, now the Government of Kerala is constructing a new bridge parallel to the historic Iron bridge in Kollam city.

== Major Public/Private institutions situated near Cutchery ==
- Kollam KSRTC Bus Station & Garage
- KSWTD Boat Jetty, Kollam
- Kollam Taluk Office
- Post Office - 691013
- KTDC Tamarind Hotel
- House boats yard, Kollam
- Hotel See Bee

== See also ==
- Kollam
- Chinnakada
- RP Mall
- Downtown Kollam
