= Alumpeedika =

- Village
- Location within Kerala Location within India
- Coordinates: 9°03′17″N 76°32′07″E
- Country: India
- State: Kerala
- Division: South Kerala
- District: Kollam
- Sub District: Karunagappalli
- City: Oachira
- Time zone: UTC+5:30 (IST)
- Pin code: 690547

Alumpeedika is a small village/hamlet of Oachira in the Kollam district of Kerala, India. It comes under Clappana Panchayath and belongs to South Kerala division. It is located 31 km North of the district headquarters, Kollam, 1 km from Oachira, and 101 km from the state capital, Thiruvananthapuram. Nearby towns include Kayamkulam, Oachira, and Karunagappalli. Alumpeedika is near the border of the Kollam and Alappuzha districts. It is near to Arabian Sea.

== Transportation ==
Ochira and Kayamkulam Junction railway stations are nearby; however, Quilon Junction railway station is 32 km from Alumpeedika.
