= RP Mall, Kollam =

RP Mall
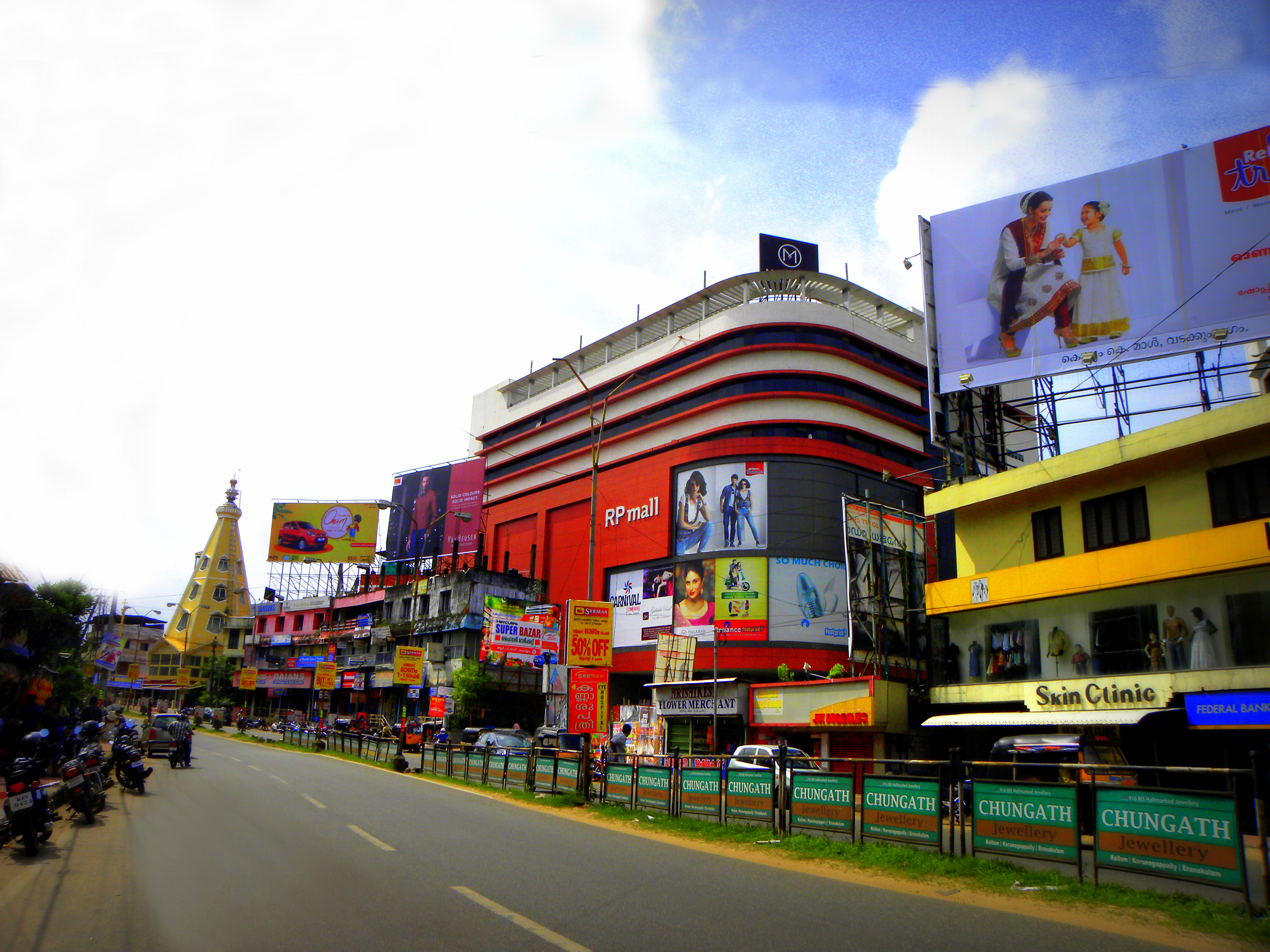
- A distant view of RP Mall, Kollam
- Location: Kollam, Kerala, India
- Coordinates: 8.889702°N 76.585810°E
- Address: Off Chinnakada
- Opened: 2012
- Owner: RP Group (owned by B. Ravi Pillai)
- Architect: Fort-in Infra developers Pvt. Ltd.
- Floor area: 205,000 square feet (19,000 m^{2})
- Floors: 6
- Parking: Underground
- Public transit: Kollam KSRTC - 400 m Kollam Junction - 1.7 km Kollam KSWTD - 400 m
- Website: www.malabardevelopers.com/project/K-Mall

The RP Mall is a shopping mall in the city of Kollam, Kerala, owned by one of the business tycoons in India, B. Ravi Pillai's RP Group. The Mall is located on Kollam's high street. RP Mall was formerly known as K-Mall (Kollam Mall).

RP Mall has about 295,000 sq ft (27,400 m^{2}) of retail space, spread on seven floors. There is a 2,700 sq ft (250 m^{2}) McDonald's restaurant.
