= EKN (disambiguation) =

EKN is the National Export Credits Guarantee Board of Sweden (Swedish: Exportkreditnämnden).

EKN may also refer to:

- Eine kleine Nachtmusik, a 1787 composition by Wolfgang Amadeus Mozart
- Ezhukone railway station, Kerala, India (station code: EKN)
- Eestlaste Kesknõukogu Kanadas, a Canadian organisation for Estonians
