= Valacode =

- village
- Interactive map of Valacode
- Country: India
- State: Kerala
- District: Kollam
- Talukas: Pathanapuram

Languages
  - Official: Malayalam, English
- Time zone: UTC+5:30 (IST)
- PIN: 691331
- Vehicle registration: KL-

Valacode (Village) is a village in Kollam district in the state of Kerala, India.
