= Ezhukone railway station =

Railway station in Kerala, India

Ezhukone
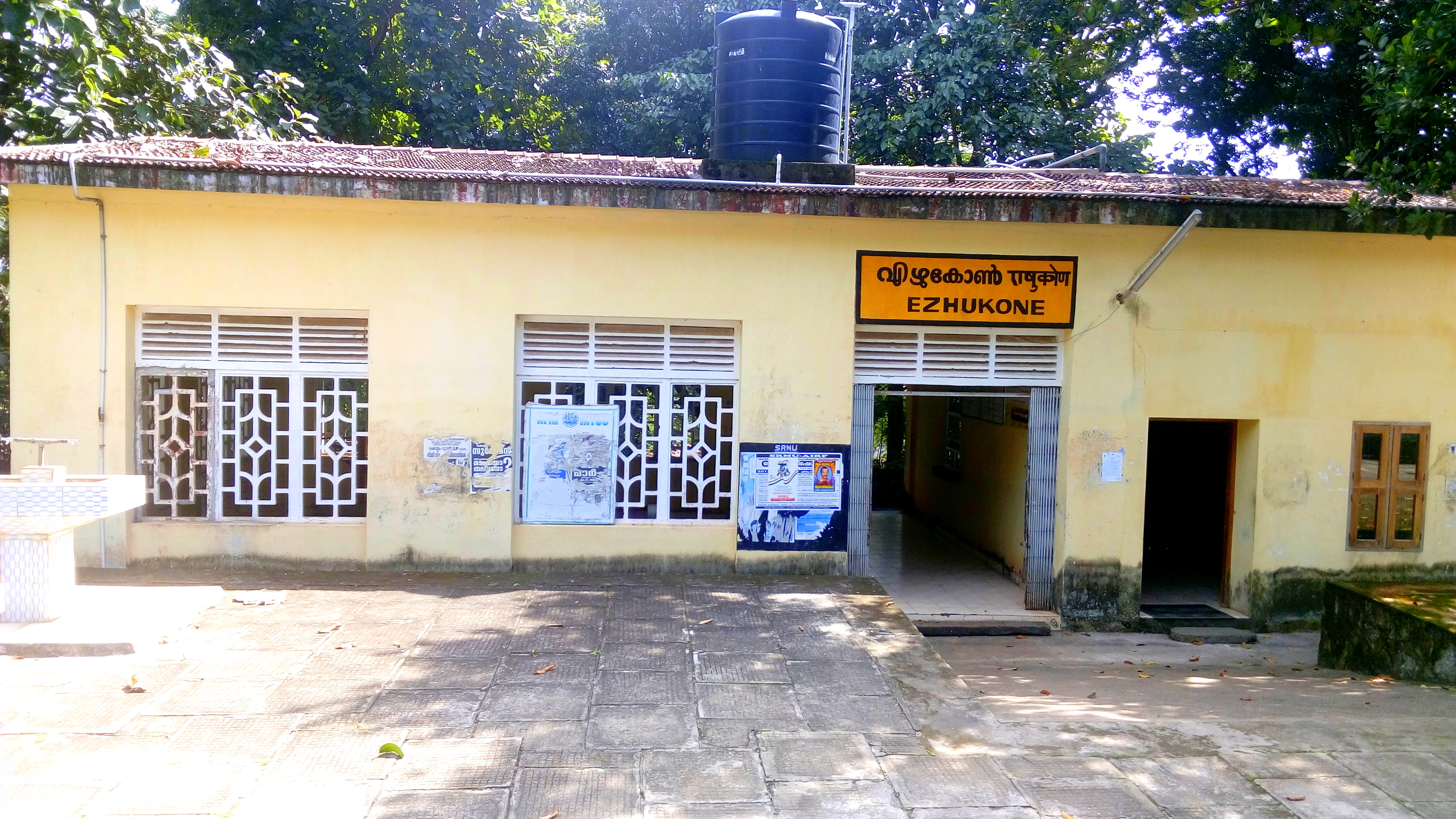

General information
- Location: Ezhukone, Kollam, Kerala; India
- Coordinates: 8.979390°N 76.715308°E
- System: Regional rail, Light rail & Commuter rail station
- Owner: Indian Railways
- Operator: Southern Railway zone
- Line: Kollam–Sengottai branch line
- Platforms: 1
- Tracks: 1

Construction
- Structure type: At–grade
- Parking: Available

Other information
- Status: Functioning
- Station code: EKN
- Zone(s): Southern Railway zone
- Division(s): Madurai
- Fare zone: Indian Railways

History
- Opened: 1904; 122 years ago

Passengers
- 2022–23: 137847 per day 378 per year
Route map
Location

Ezhukone railway station (station code:EKN) is an NSG–6 category Indian railway station in Madurai railway division of Southern Railway zone. It serves Edamann, located in Kollam district of the Indian state of Kerala.

The nearest railway stations are Kundara East and Kottarakara. All seven pairs of trains passing through have halts at Ezhukone railway station.

== Performance and earnings ==
For the FY 2022–23, the annual earnings of the station was ₹1,305,382 (US$14,000) and daily earnings was ₹3,576 (US$37). For the same financial year, the annual passenger count was 137,847 and daily count was 378. While, the footfall per day was recorded as 504.

== See also ==
- List of railway stations in India
