= Nadakkal =

Nadakkal Kadamantottam
- village
- Location in Kerala, India Nadakkal (India)
- Coordinates: 8°50′59″N 76°45′11″E
- Country: India
- State: Kerala
- District: Kollam

Government
  - Body: Kalluvathukkal Panchayath

Languages
  - Official: Malayalam, English
- Time zone: UTC+5:30 (IST)
- PIN: 691579
- Telephone code: 0474
- Vehicle registration: KL-02
- Nearest city: Kollam
- Lok Sabha constituency: Kollam
- Civic agency: Kalluvathukkal Panchayath

Nadakkal is a small village, 2 km from Kalluvathukkal in Kollam, Kerala, India. It is near National Highway 47.
