= Kollam taluk =

Kollam Taluk
- Taluk
- Interactive map of Kollam Taluk
- Coordinates: 8.85°N 76.65°E
- Country: India
- State: Kerala
- District: Kollam

Languages
  - Official: Malayalam, English
- Time zone: UTC+5:30 (IST)

Kollam Taluk is one among the five taluks, or administrative areas, of Kollam district in Kerala State, India. This taluk contains the city area of Kollam and the municipal area of Paravur. Compared with other taluks, Kollam taluk is fairly developed.

Kollam Taluk is bounded by Karunagappally and Kunnathur Taluks to the north, Kottarakkara Taluk to the east, the Arabian Sea to the west, and Thiruvananthapuram District to the south.

== See also ==
- Kollam
- Peringad
