= Malumel =

- village
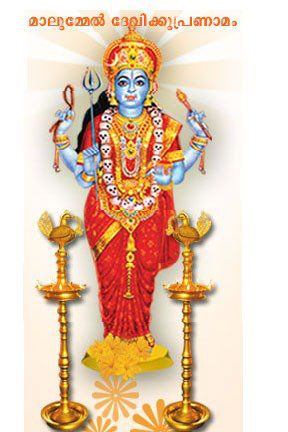
- Malumel Bhagavathy
- Interactive map of Malumel
- Country: India
- State: Kerala
- District: Kollam

Languages
  - Official: Malayalam, English
- Time zone: UTC+5:30 (IST)
- PIN: 690523
- Vehicle registration: KL-23
- Climate: moderate (Köppen)
- Website: www.malumeldevaswom.org.in

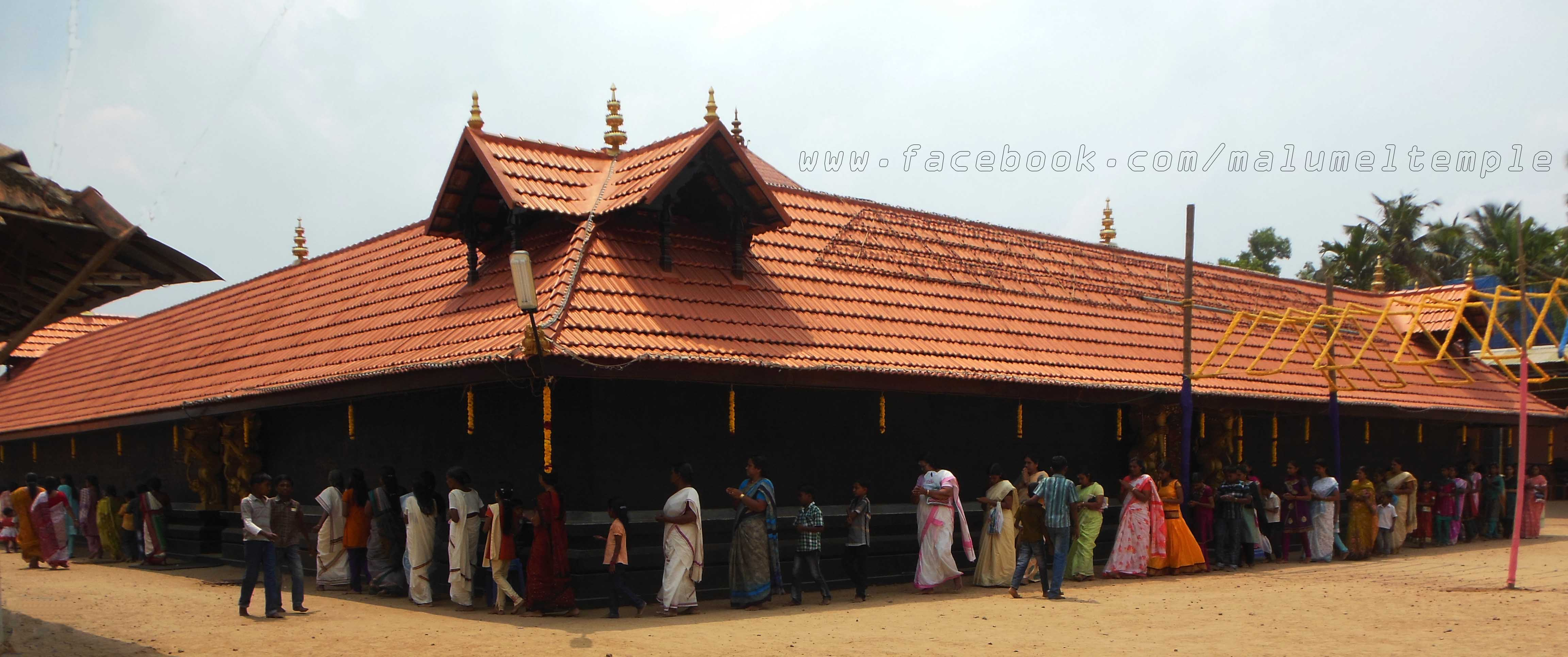
Malumel Temple

Malumel is a locality in the Thodiyoor Panchayat of Kollam district, Kerala, India. The village belongs to Karunagappally Taluk.
