= Ochira railway station =

Railway station in Kerala, India

Ochira
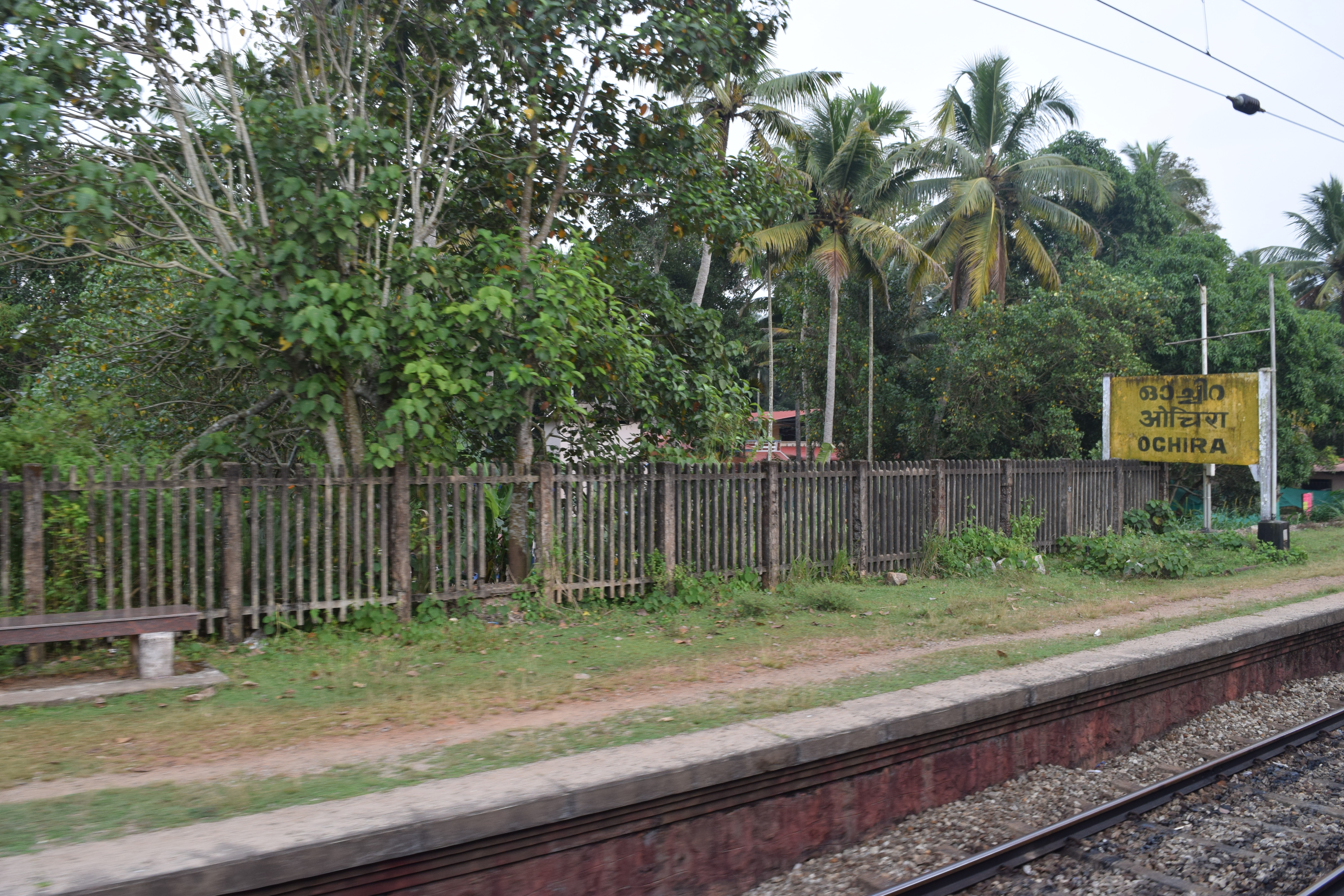

General information
- Location: Ochira, Kollam, Kerala; India
- Coordinates: 9.131808°N 76.525223°E
- Owner: Indian Railways
- Operator: Southern Railway zone
- Line: Ernakulam–Kottayam-Kollam line
- Platforms: 2
- Tracks: 4

Construction
- Structure type: At–grade

Other information
- Status: Functioning
- Station code: OCR
- Zone(s): Southern Railway zone
- Division(s): Thiruvananthapuram
- Fare zone: Indian Railways

History
- Opened: 1958; 68 years ago
- Electrified: 25 kV AC 50 Hz
Route map
Location
- Location within India Location within Kerala

Ochira railway station (station code: OCR) is an NSG–6 category Indian railway station in the Thiruvananthapuram railway division of the Southern Railway zone. It is situated near the city of Kollam in Kollam district of Kerala. Ochira railway station is situated at the borders of Kollam district. The railway station is situated between Karunagappalli and Kayamkulam. The nearest rail head is Kollam Junction railway station. The other major railway stations near Ochira are Kayamkulam Junction railway station and Karunagappalli railway station.

== Significance ==
Ochira is well connected with various cities in India, such as Kollam, Trivandrum, Kochi, Thrissur, and Kottayam through Indian Railways. It is the nearest railway station to Oachira Parabrahma Temple, an ancient temple located at the borders of Kollam district. Ochira railway station is under the list of Indian Railways to be developed as world class railway stations along with other 11 Kerala railway stations.

== Services ==
Trains stopping at Ochira railway station.

No.	Train no	Origin	Destination	Train name
1.	56300/56301	Kollam Junction	Alappuzha	Passenger
2.	56391/56392	Kollam Junction	Ernakulam	Passenger
3.	56305	Kottayam	Kollam Junction	Passenger
4.	56304	Nagercoil Junction	Kottayam	Passenger
5.	66300/66301	Kollam Junction	Ernakulam	MEMU
6.	66307/66308	Ernakulam	Kollam Junction	MEMU
7.	56393/56394	Kottayam	Kollam Junction	Passenger
8.	66302/66303	Kollam Junction	Ernakulam	MEMU
9.	56365/56366	Guruvayur	Punalur	Fast Passenger
10.	16791/16792	Thoothukudi	Palakkad Junction	Palaruvi Express

== See also ==
- Kollam Junction railway station
- Karunagappalli railway station
- Kayamkulam Junction railway station
- Paravur railway station
