= Kollam KSWTD Ferry Terminal =

Ferry terminal in Kollam, Kerala, India

Kollam KSWTD Boat Jetty കൊല്ലം KSWTD ഫെറി ടെര്‍മിനല്‍
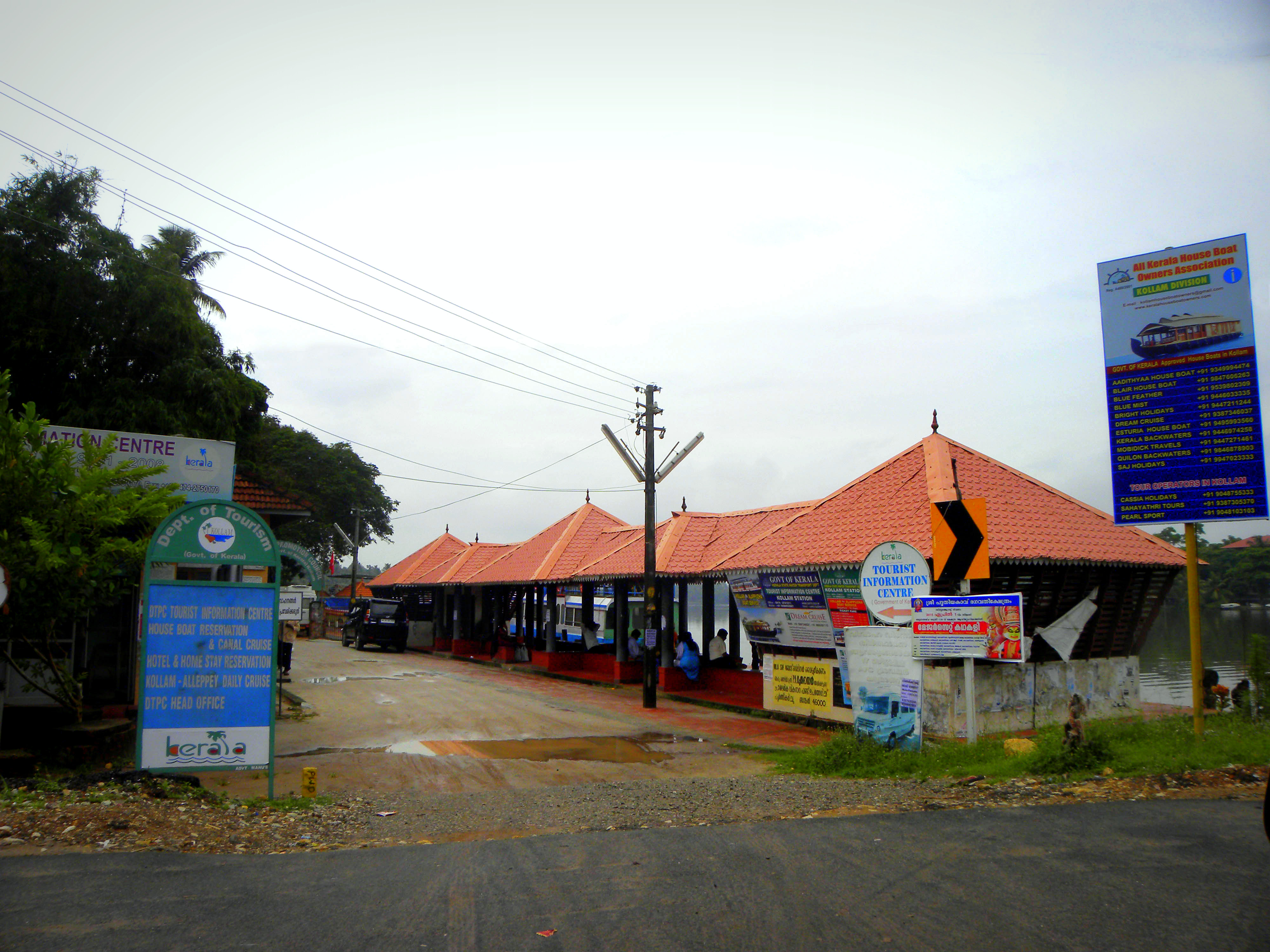
- Kollam KSWTD Ferry Terminal

General information
- Location: Cutchery, Kollam, Kerala; India
- Coordinates: 8.891826°N 76.585269°E
- Owner: Kerala State Water Transport Department(KSWTD)
- Operator: Kerala State Water Transport Department

Services
Passenger Ferries
Location

Kollam KSWTD Boat Jetty or Kollam KSWTD Ferry Station is an transport hub in the city of Kollam in Kerala, India, one of 14 ferry stations owned by the Kerala State Water Transport Department.

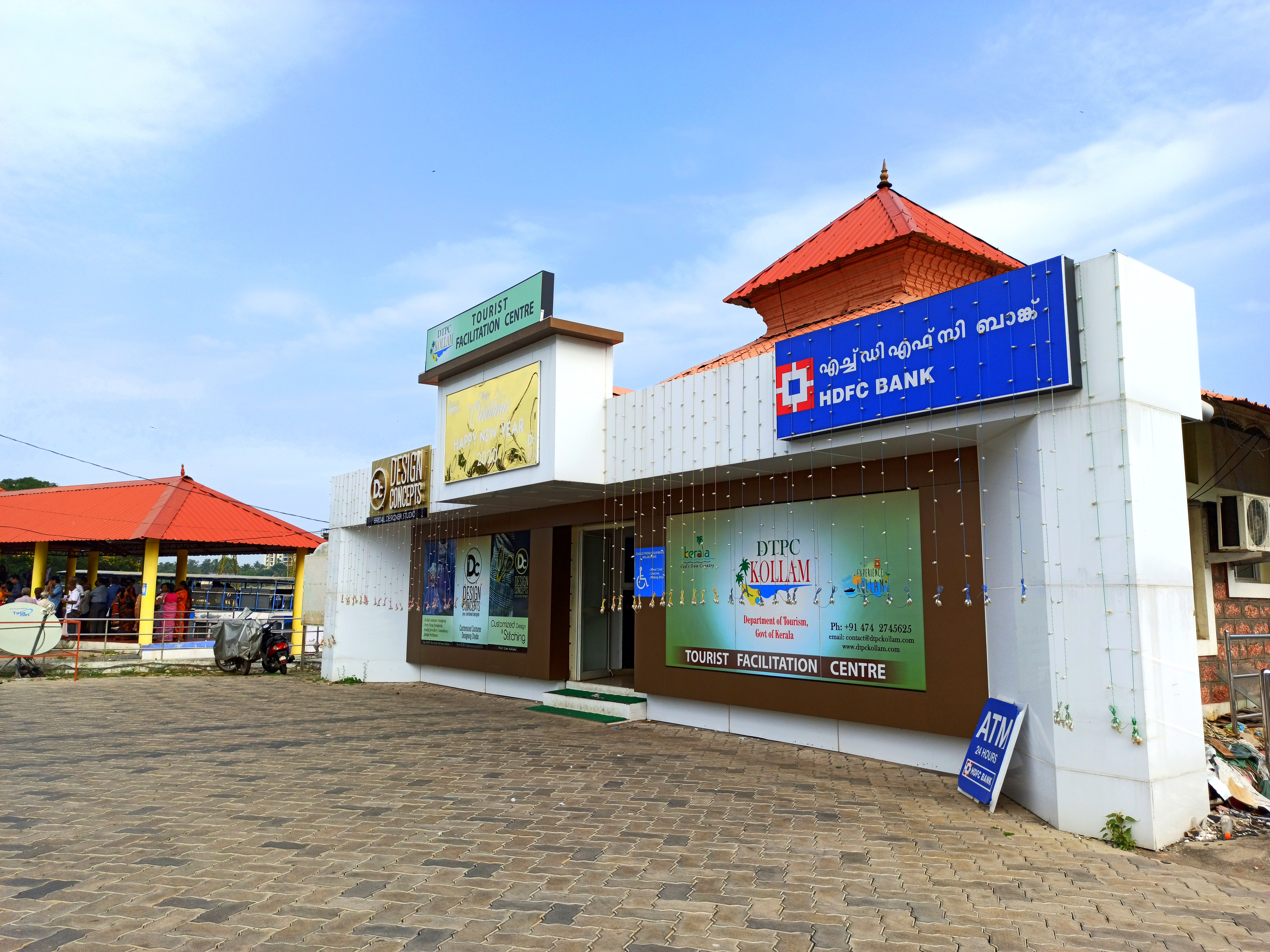
Tourist Facilitation Centre near Kollam Ferry Terminal

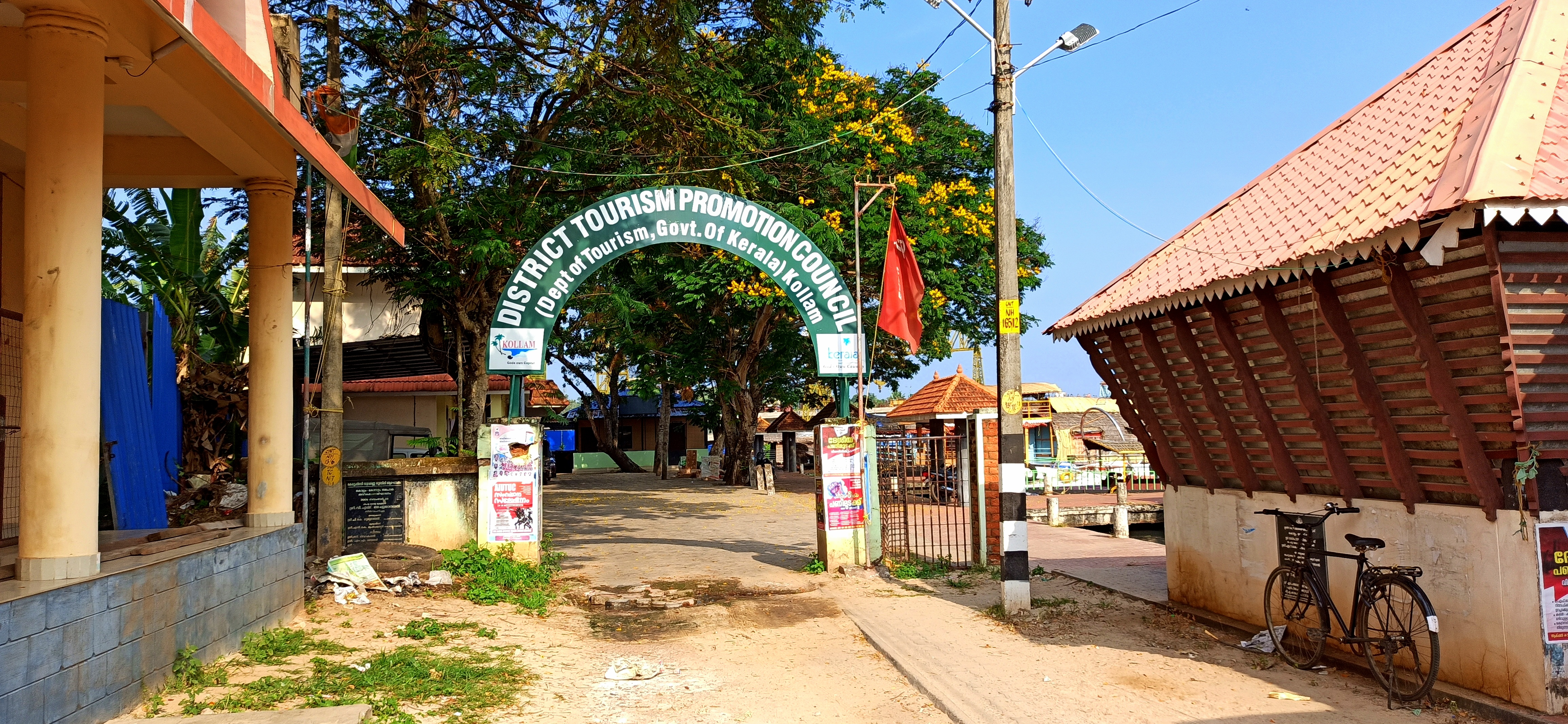
DTPC Office near Kollam Ferry Terminal

== Importance ==
Kollam is one of the few cities in Kerala which is reachable by rail, road or water transportation. The city of Kollam (Quilon) was the commercial capital of the princely state of Travancore. Kollam Port was founded by Mar Abo at Tangasseri in 825. The district's major waterways include Ashtamudi Lake, Paravur Kayal, Sasthamcotta Lake and the historic Kollam Canal. The Kerala State Water Transport Department (KSWTD) operates ferries from Kollam to the following destinations:

- Sampranikkodi
- Guhanandapuram
- Pezhumthuruthu
- Muthiraparamb (West Kallada)
- Ayiramthengu
- Munroe Island
- Alappuzha

== Location ==
The KSWTD jetty is situated near Kollam KSRTC Bus Station in Cutchery. The ferry station is situated on the side of Asramam Link Road. Kollam has two gateways to the backwaters of Kerala.

- Kollam Junction railway station - 2.2 km
- Kollam Port - 2.0 km
- Kollam Beach - 3.3 km

== Kollam-Alappuzha Tourist Boat Service ==
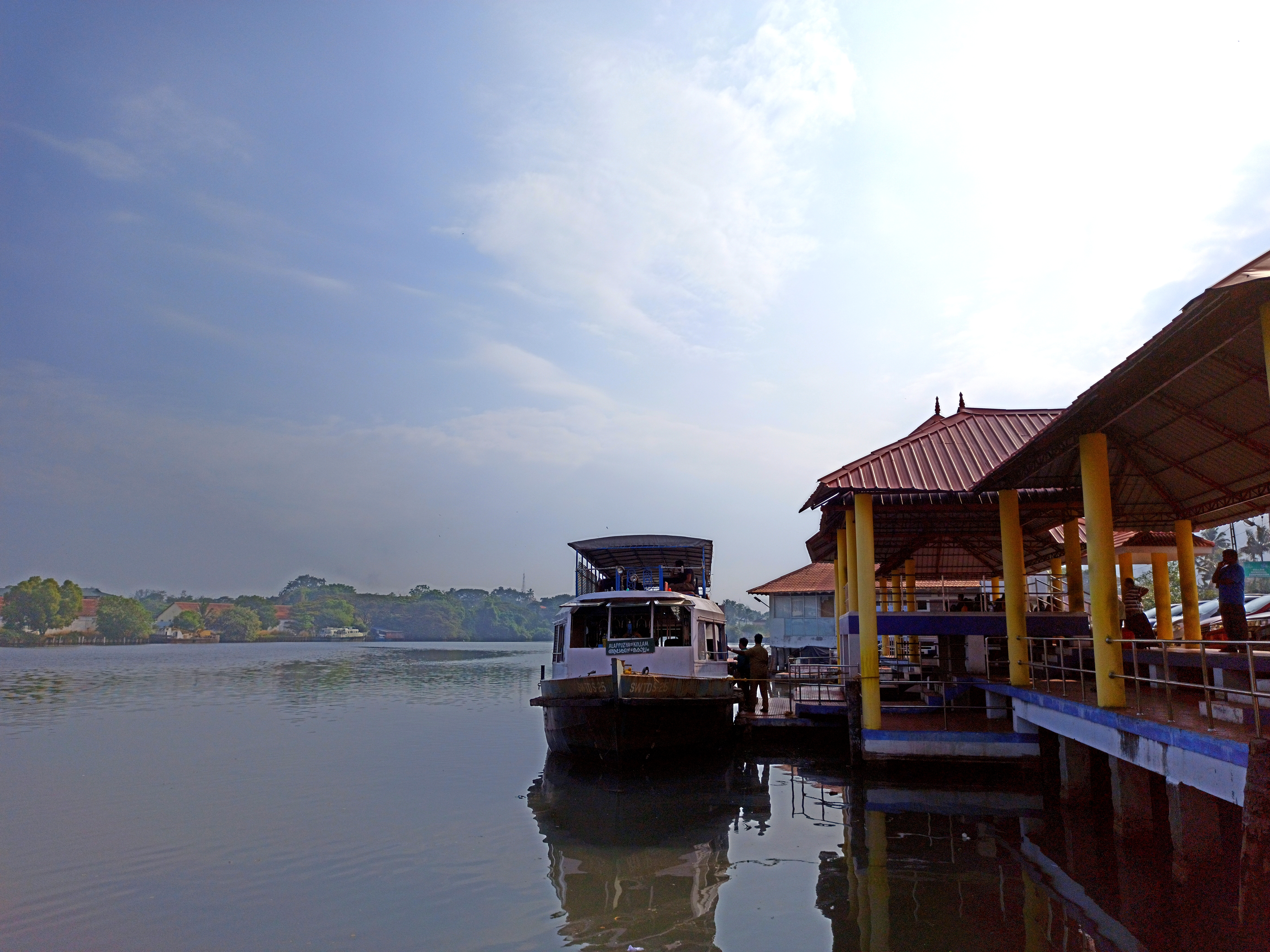
Kollam-Alappuzha tourist boat at Kollam Ferry Terminal

The Kollam-Alappuzha route is the longest service operated by KSWTD within Kerala. The eight-hour-long journey passes through Ashtamudi Lake, Kayamkulam Lake and Vembanad Lake and through narrow canals. The route also passes through the settlements in Amritapuri, Tharayilkadavu, Alumkadavu, Kovilthottam, Chavara, Pallikkodi & Kavanad.

== See also ==
- Kollam KSRTC Bus Station
- Kollam Junction railway station
- Andamukkam City Bus Stand
- Kollam Port
- Kerala State Water Transport Department
- Cutchery
- Asramam Link Road
- Kochi Water Metro
