= Kottarakara railway station =

Railway station in Kerala, India

Kottarakara
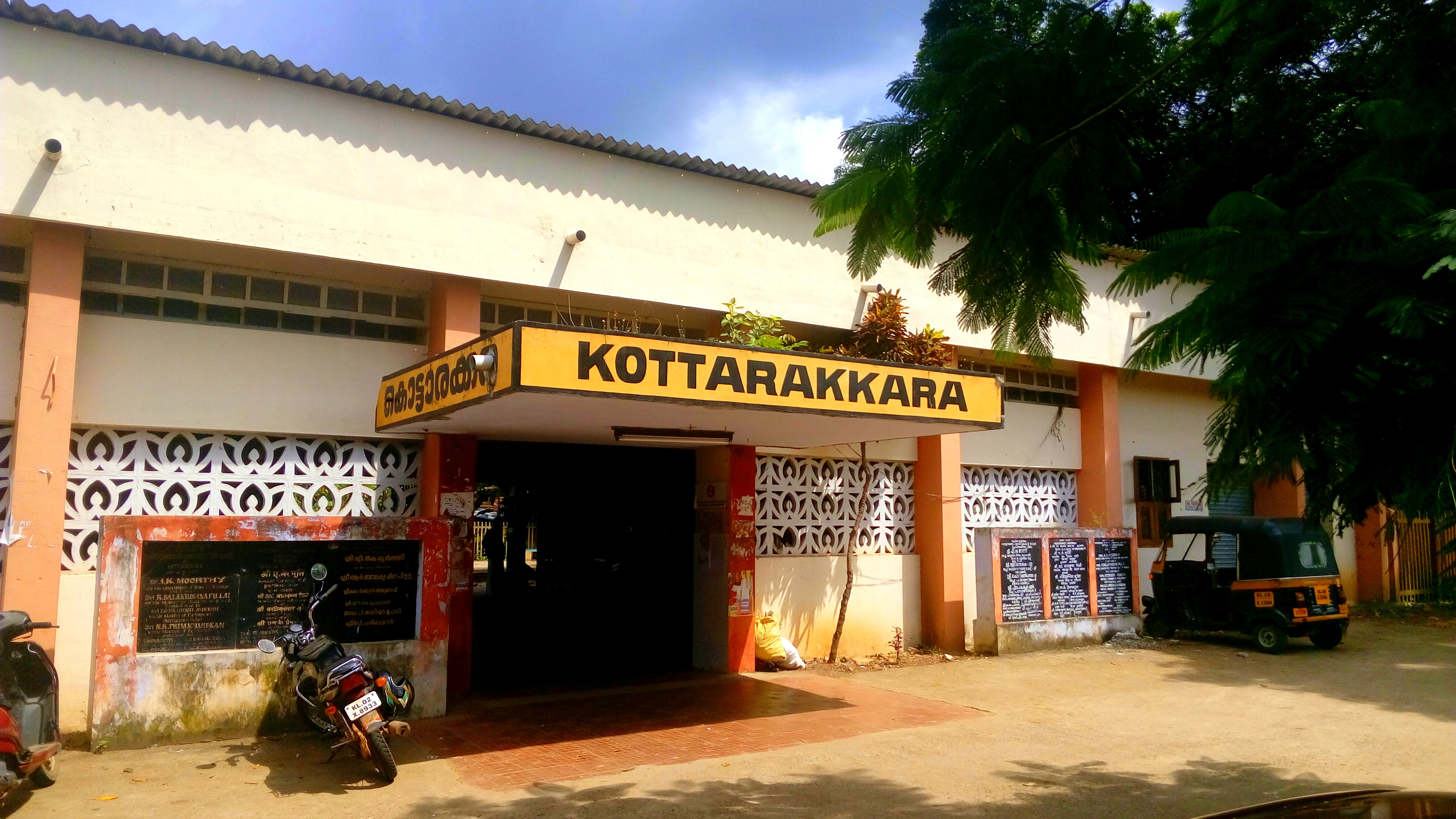

General information
- Location: Beside NH-744, Kottarakkara, Kollam, Kerala; India
- Coordinates: 9.0003°N 76.7659°E
- System: Regional rail, Light rail & Commuter rail station
- Owner: Indian Railways
- Operator: Southern Railway zone
- Line: Kollam–Sengottai branch line
- Platforms: 2
- Tracks: 2

Construction
- Structure type: At–grade
- Parking: Available

Other information
- Status: Functioning
- Station code: KKZ
- Zone(s): Southern Railway zone
- Division(s): Madurai
- Fare zone: Southern Railway zone
- Classification: NSG-5

History
- Opened: 1904; 122 years ago

Passengers
- 2022–23: 259,448 per year 711 per day
Route map
Location
- Location within India Location within Kerala

Kottarakara railway station (station code:KKZ) is an NSG–5 category Indian railway station in Madurai railway division of Southern Railway zone. It serves Kottarakkara, located in Kollam district of the Indian state of Kerala.

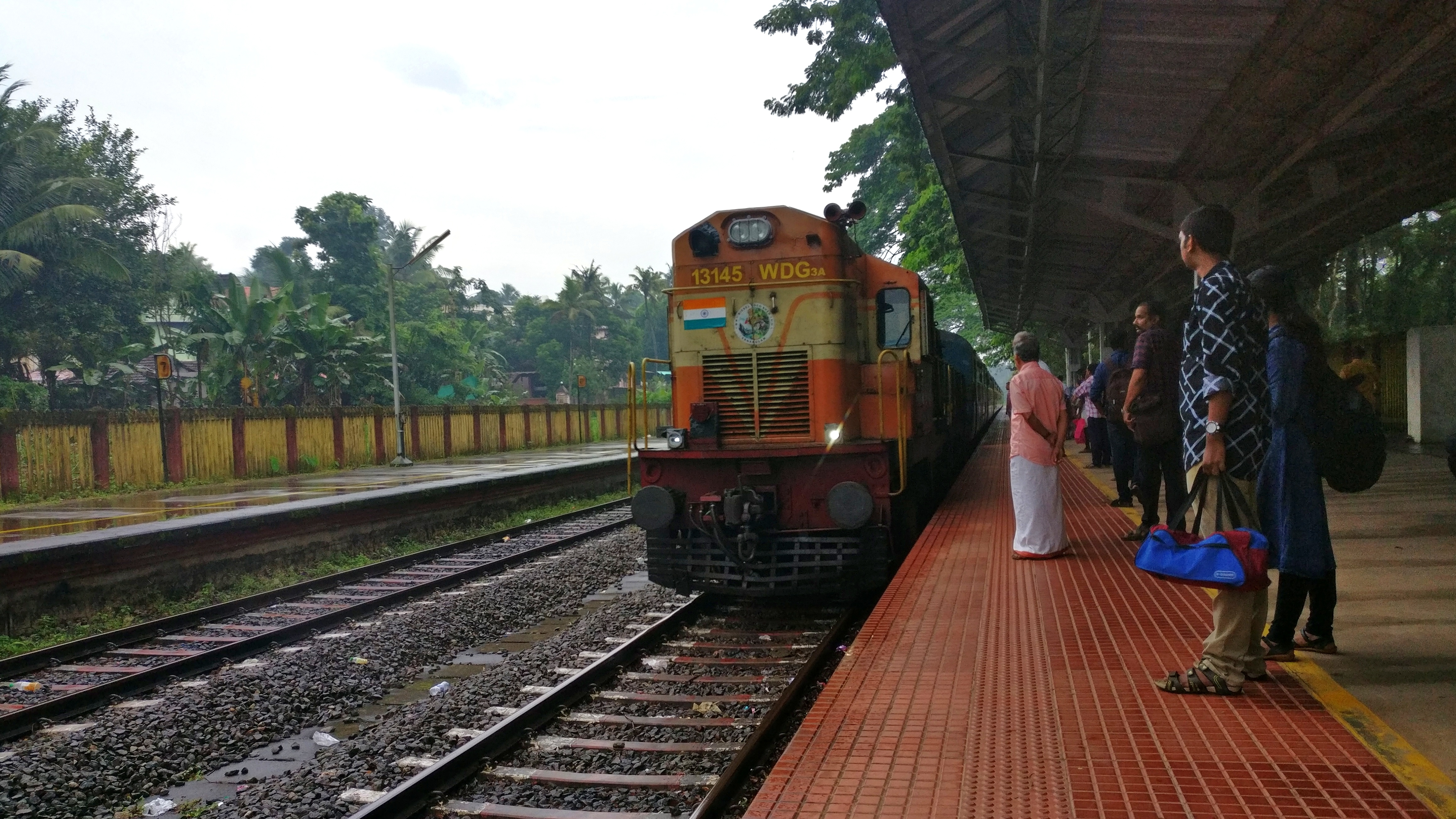
Punalur-Kanyakumari passenger at Kottarakkara

== Performance and earnings ==
For the FY 2022–23, the annual earnings of the station was ₹6,613,959 (US$69,000) and daily earnings was ₹18,120 (US$190). For the same financial year, the annual passenger count was 259,448 and daily count was 711. While, the footfall per day was recorded as 1005.

== See also ==
- List of railway stations in India
