= Oachira =

Main district border between Alappuzha & Kollam in Kerala

Oachira Dakshina Kashi
- Town
- Location in Kerala, India Oachira (India)
- Coordinates: 9°8′0″N 76°30′0″E
- Country: India
- State: Kerala
- District: Kollam

Languages
  - Official: Malayalam, English
- Time zone: UTC+5:30 (IST)
- PIN: 690526
- STD Code: 0476
- Vehicle registration: KL23 & KL29
- Nearest city: Kollam (32 km)
- Lok Sabha Constituency: Alappuzha
- Legislative Assembly: Karunagapally (Kollam District)

Oachira or Ochira (Ōcciṟa) is in the Karunagapally taluk of Kollam district. Oachira Grama Panchayat came into existence in 1953.

Oachira is the seat of the ancient Oachira Temple. It is considered a sacred place and hence called Dakshina Kashi.

Oachira is on the border of Kollam and Allappuzha districts on the National Highway 66 served by KSRTC bus services and Oachira railway station served by Indian Railways Southern Railway zone.

== Culture ==
Oachira carries significant cultural importance in the religious traditions of Kerala. It is home to the Oachira Parabrahma Temple, which is known for its significance to Shiva mythology and for its open-air idol worship, where idols are not housed in a typical nada. Multiple native festivals such as 28am Onam, Oachirakali and Oachira Vrishchikotsavam revolve around this temple.

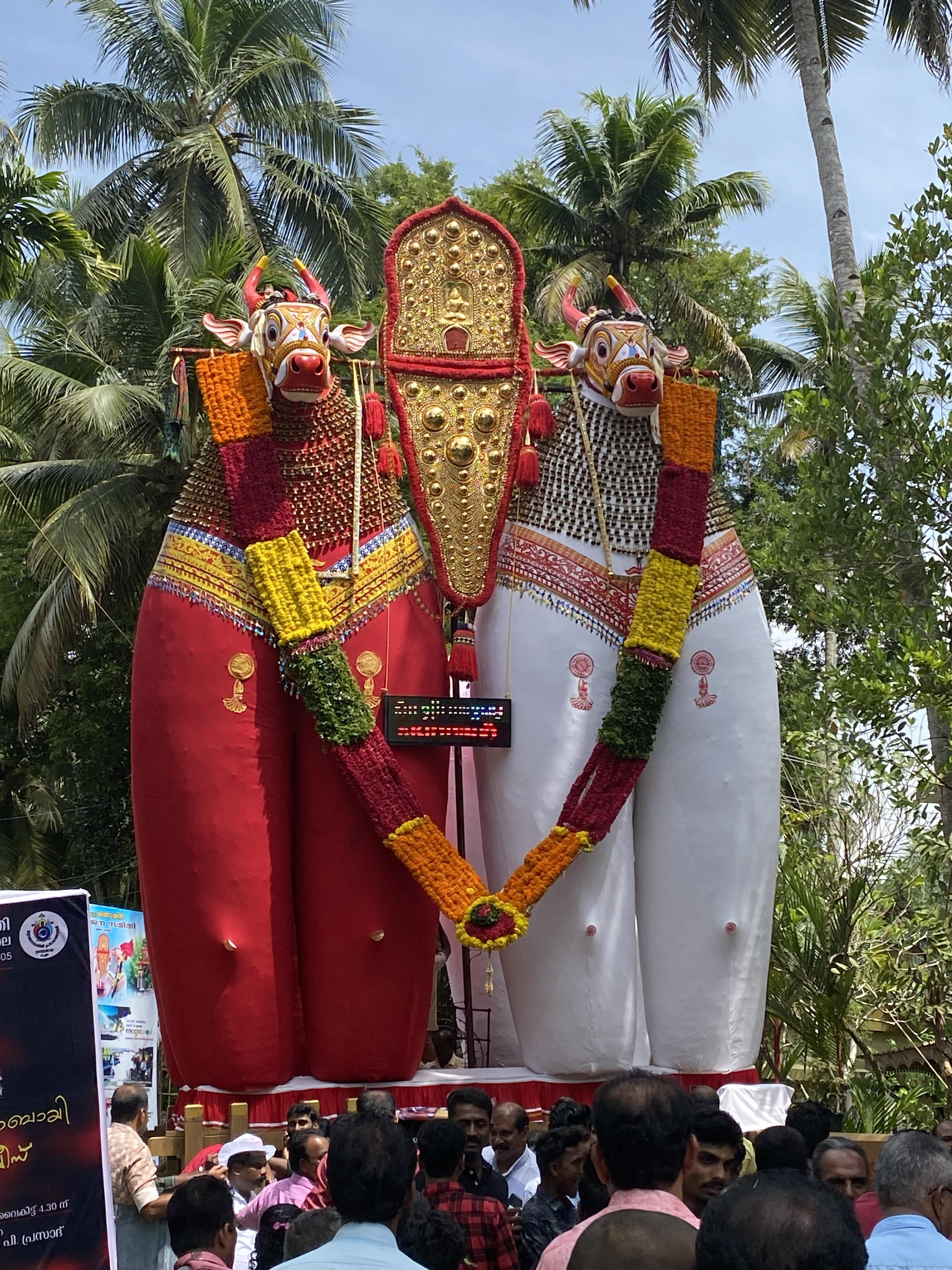
A nandikeshan being winched to the temple during 28am Onam

=== 28am Onam ===
28am Onam or Oachira Kalakettu falls on the Thiruvonam day of Malayalam month of Kanni, or 28 days after the festival of Onam. The history of this festival dates back centuries where worshippers build nandikeshans (oxen) out of the leftover hay from monsoon harvest of rice as an offering to Shiva. Over the years, this festival has evolved to become of the largest celebrations in Kerala, today participated by hundreds of karas or factions, each with a nandikeshan with sizes varying from microscale to hundreds of feet. Some of these Nandikeshans boasts a metal endoskeleton to support their large structure and requires construction-grade cranes to be winched from their build site in their respective karas to the temple.

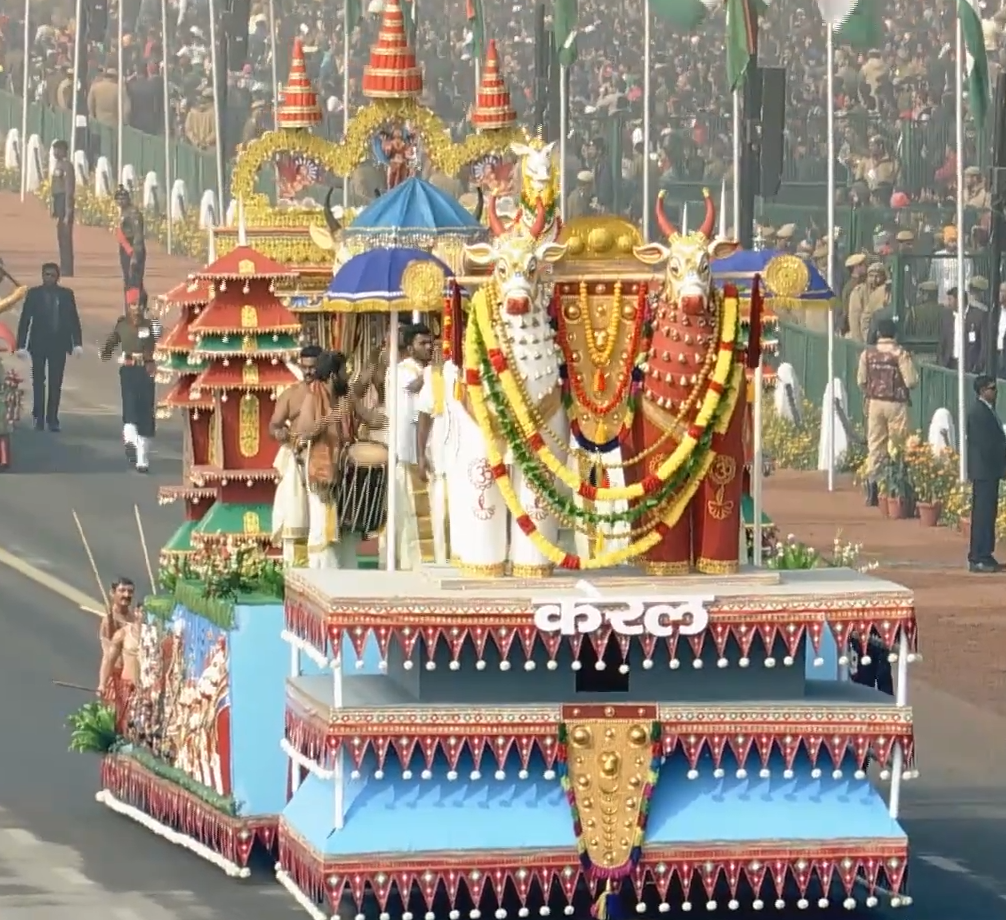
Oachira Kalakettu being the center-piece of Kerala's 2018 Republic Day parade tableau

=== Oachirakali ===
Oachirakali is a ritualized martial art reenactment that takes place in the waterlogged padanilams (battlefeilds) of Oachira Parabrahma Temple during the month of Mithunam.

The history of Oachirakali dates back to the 12^{th} century, where warriors from 52 karas under the Kayamkulam Kingdom, takes part in wargames. They utilize sticks, swords and shields to practice offensive and defensive moves while being watched by thousands of spectators coming from all across South India. The wargames will be led by kaliaasaans and the players yell their warcry, "thee thee theai" while engaging their enemies.

=== Vrishchikotsavam ===
Vrishchikotsavam or pandrandu-velakku or 12 lamps is a festival celebrated during the first twelve days of the month Vrishchikam. During this time period, the devotees sit, pray and meditate in the Oachira Parabrahma Temple to wash their sins away. They live in huts within the temple during the time of this festival.

== Notable people ==
- Abdul Sathar Kunju, 21st Chief of Kerala Police
- K. P. Nambiathiri, Indian cinematographer who has worked in a number of 3-D films
- K. Surendran, Malayalam writer and Vayalaar Award winner
- Ochira Velukkutty, Indian dramatist in the early days of Malayalam theatre
- S. Guptan Nair, Malayalam writer, literary critic, scholar, orator, essayist, lexicographer, translator and educator
- S. Ramachandran Pillai, C.P.I (M) Politburo Member
- Geetha Salam, Film Actor
