= Peringad =

Village in Kollam District, Kerala, India

Coordinates: 10°33′N 76°04′E

Peringad is a village near to puvathur Town in thrissur District, Kerala, India.

== Chithara Estate ==
The famous oil palm "Chithara Estate" is here.
