= Thazhathu Kulakkada =

Village in Kollam District, Kerala, India

Thazhathu Kulakkada is a small village in Kollam district of Kerala state in India. It is near another place named Kulakkada

== Economy ==
The people of this village are mainly farmers. Educated youths within the village travel outside of the state and overseas to seek better jobs. But the trend is now slowly changing. This is quiet evident from the number of agricultural farms situated there.

== Temples ==
There is a big playground and two big temples (Thiru Amin Kunnathu Bhagawathi Temple & Puthiyidathu Sree Mahadevar Temple) is located in the centre of the village.
