= Kollam KSRTC bus station =

Bus station in Kollam, Kerala

Kollam KSRTC bus station കൊല്ലം കെ.എസ്സ്.ആര്‍.ടി.സി ബസ്സ്‌ സ്റ്റേഷന്‍
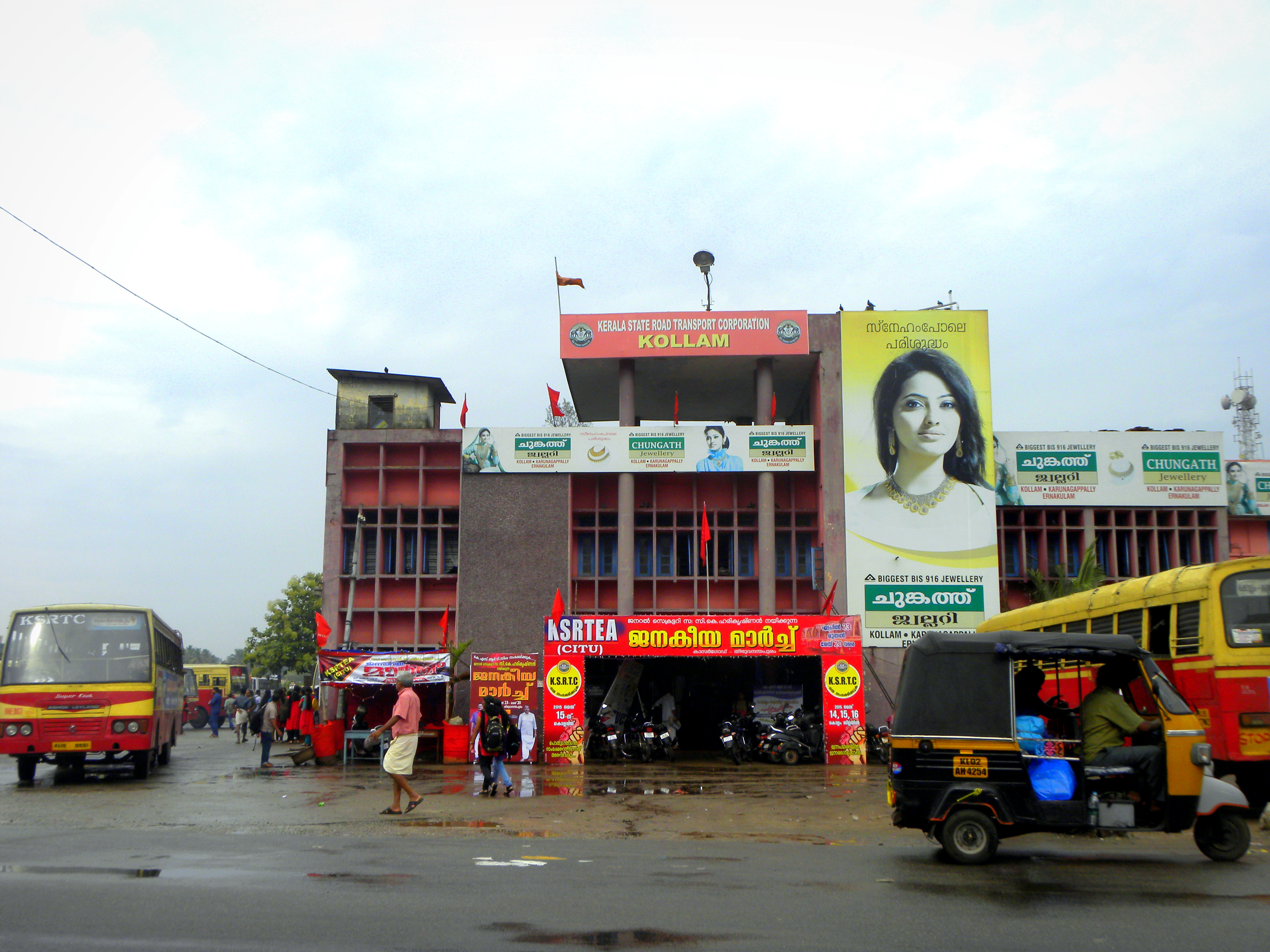
- A view of Kollam KSRTC bus station from Asramam Link Road

General information
- Location: Cutchery, Kollam, Kerala; India
- Coordinates: 8.891194°N 76.585128°E
- System: Bus station
- Owner: Kerala State Road Transport Corporation(KSRTC)
- Operator: KSRTC
- Bus stands: 4 (Towards TVM, EKM, PLR & ADR)
- Bus operators: Services from Kollam: KSRTC (Interstate & Intrastate); Karnataka RTC & SETC (Interstate only)
- Connections: Bus; Ferry

Construction
- Structure type: At grade
- Parking: No

Other information
- Station code: KLM
- Fare zone: Kollam Zone
Location

Kollam KSRTC bus station is an important transport hub in the Indian city of Kollam, owned and operated by the Kerala State Road Transport Corporation (KSRTC) under the depot code KLM. The bus station is located in Taluk Cutchery and is close to Kerala State Water Transport Department's Kollam City water transport terminal. Long distance intrastate, inter-state and city buses run regularly from the bus station. The bus station comes under Kollam Zone of Kerala State Road Transport Corporation.

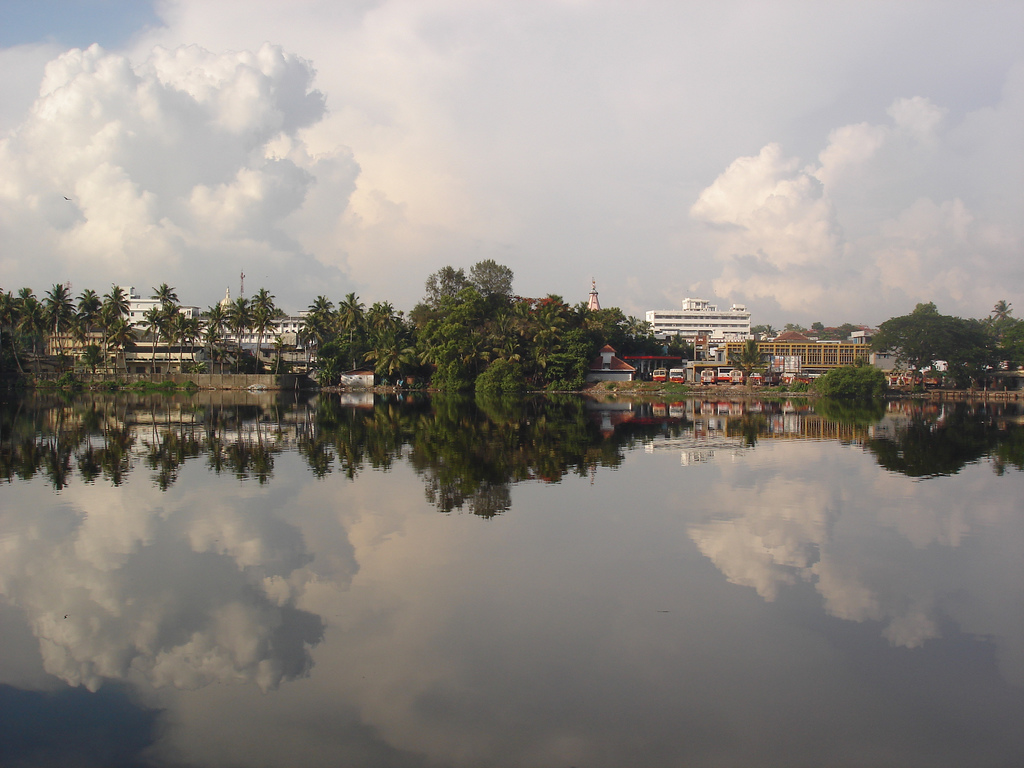
View of Kollam KSRTC Bus Station from Adventure Park

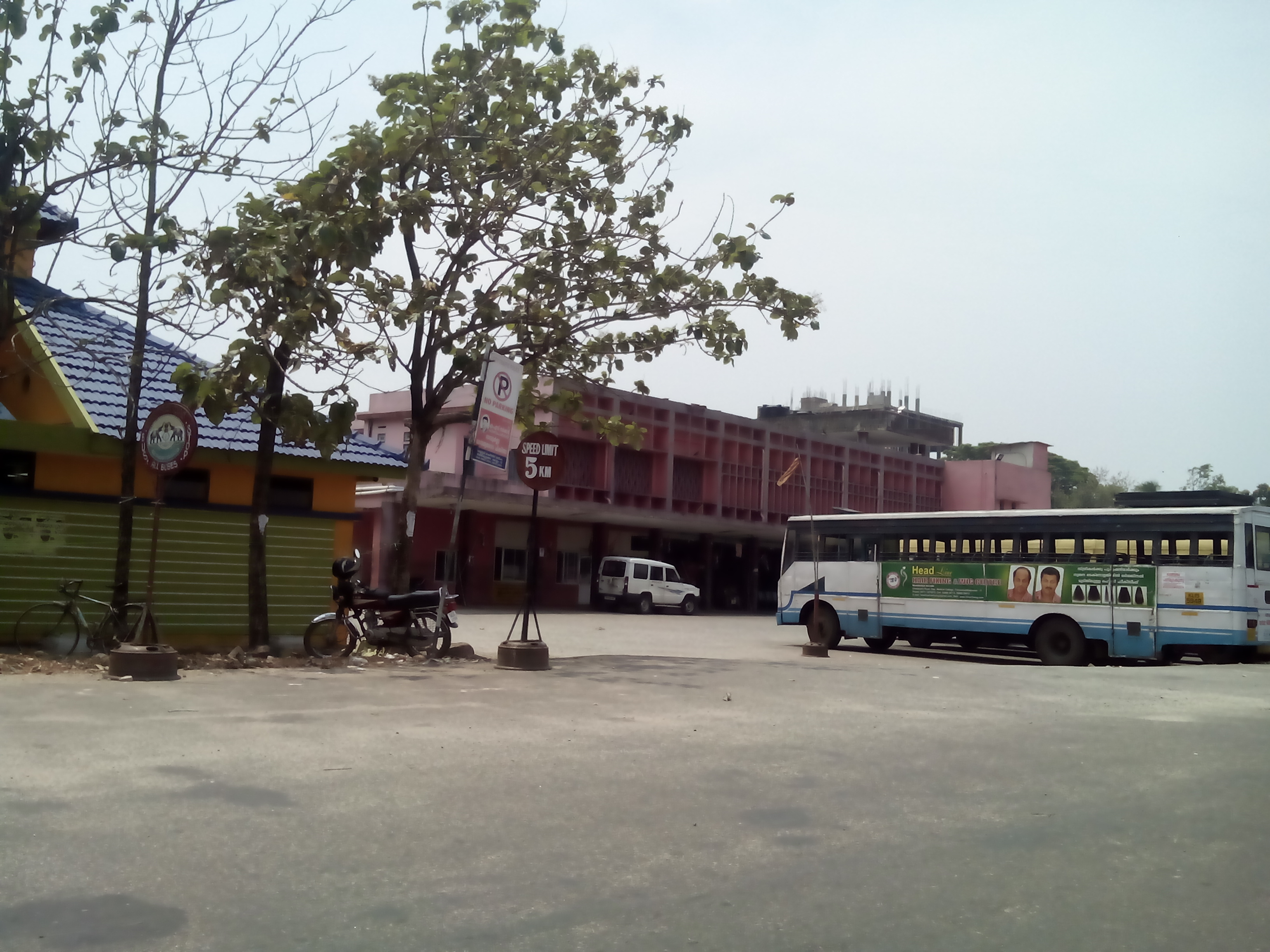
View of Kollam KSRTC Bus Station from Asramam Link Road

== Services ==
Kollam KSRTC bus station is one among the major KSRTC depots in the state. Because of the geographical position of Kollam, the depot is easily handling service through National Highways – NH 66 (formerly NH 47), NH 183 (formerly NH 220), NH 744 (formerly NH 208) of Kerala. Inter-state service towards Thoothukkudi, Madurai, Tirunelveli, Tenkasi also run from here. KSRTC's A/C low-floor buses, A/C multi-axle buses, Super Deluxe, Super Express, Super Fast, Limited Stop, Fast Passenger, Ordinary and other services ply through this depot. Kollam zone is KSRTC's second most revenue generating zone in Kerala.

On 8 January 2018, Kollam KSRTC Zone set a record in ticket collection by generating ₹1,92,12,134 (RTC ₹ 1,57, 97,932 and JNNURM ₹34,14,202); ₹7.44 was the total collection of KSRTC for that day.

== Modernization ==
- Kollam Depot will soon become a part of KSRTC's real-time booking system. The facility will allow booking of ticket online from a boarding point other than the starting centre and destination if seats are available after the bus begins its service, with the help of a new set of electronic ticket machines (ETMs) that would have the technology to alert headquarters about vacant seats on a running bus.
- As part of the modernization and qualitative improvement of KSRTC, total computerization and e-governance systems, data centre, GPRS control rooms at five centres, integration of control room, computers in the main office etc. would be setting-up in the Kollam depot, along with Thiruvananthapuram, Ernakulam, Thrissur and Kozhikode.

KSRTC also have a plan to start an operating centre in the Andamukkam City bus stand situated at Downtown Kollam area.

== See also ==
- Kollam Junction railway station
- Chinnakada
