= Administration of Kollam district =

Local government in Kerala, India

Kollam District has four types of administrative hierarchies:

- Taluk and Village administration managed by the provincial government of Kerala
- Panchayath Administration managed by the local bodies
- Parliament Constituencies for the federal government of India
- Assembly Constituencies for the provincial government of Kerala

== Administration of Kollam city ==
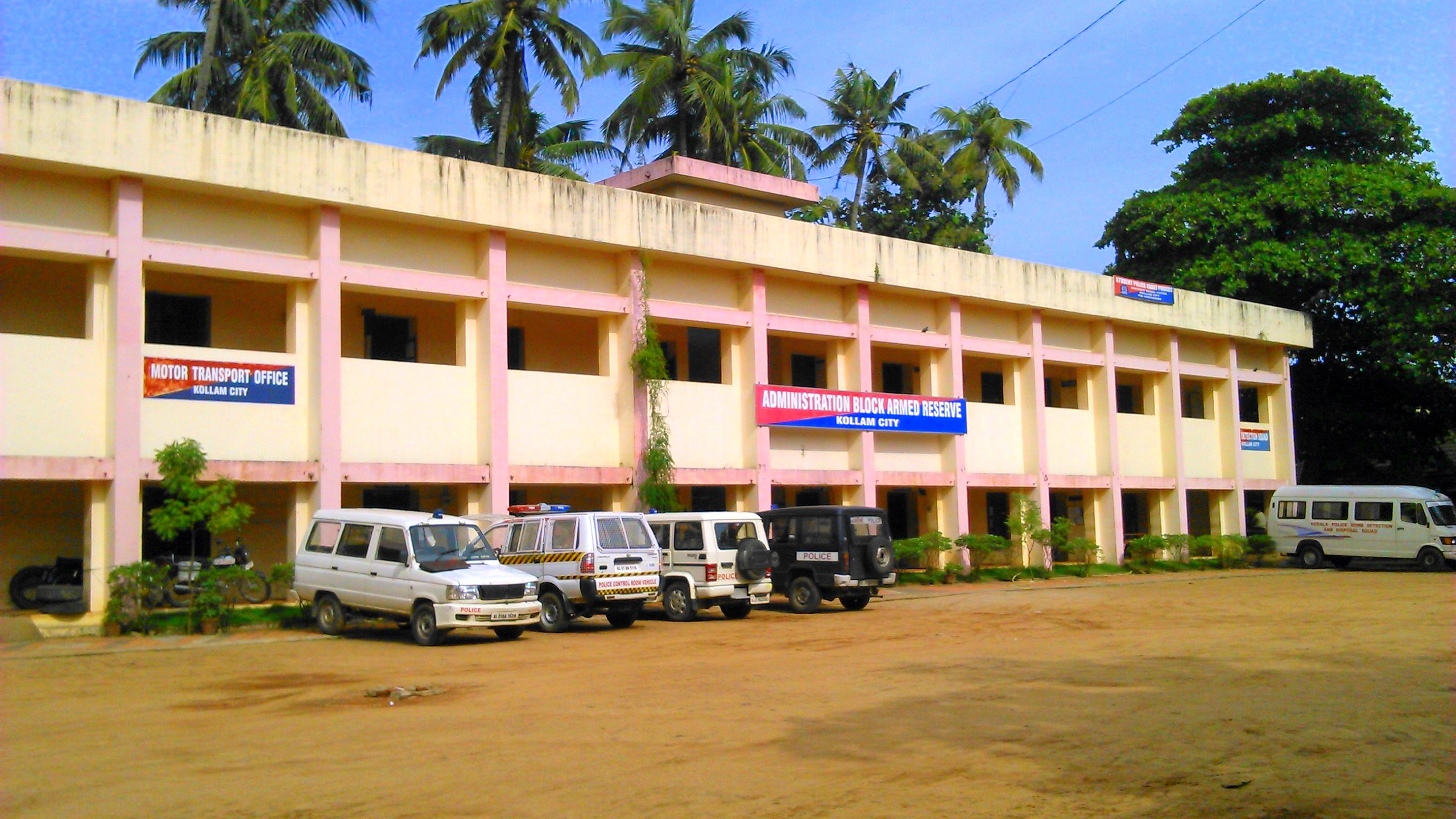
Armed Reserve Police Camp, Kollam

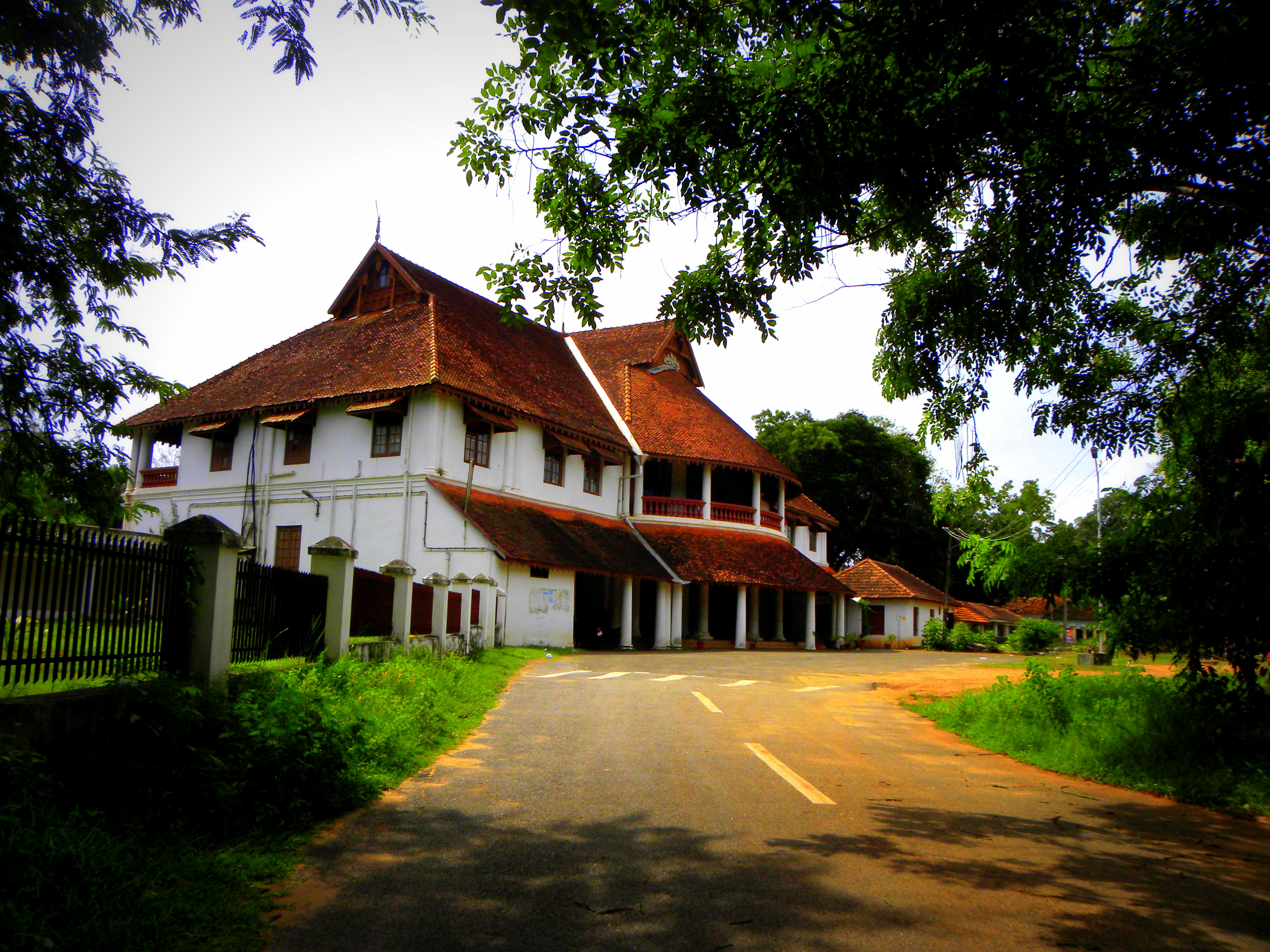
British Residency in Asramam, Kollam - Till 1829, Quilon was the capital of the Travancore State with the headquarters of the British Residency situated here

Kollam City is a Municipal Corporation with elected Councillors from its 55 divisions. The Mayor, elected from among the councillors, generally represents the political party holding a majority. The Corporation Secretary heads the office of the corporation.

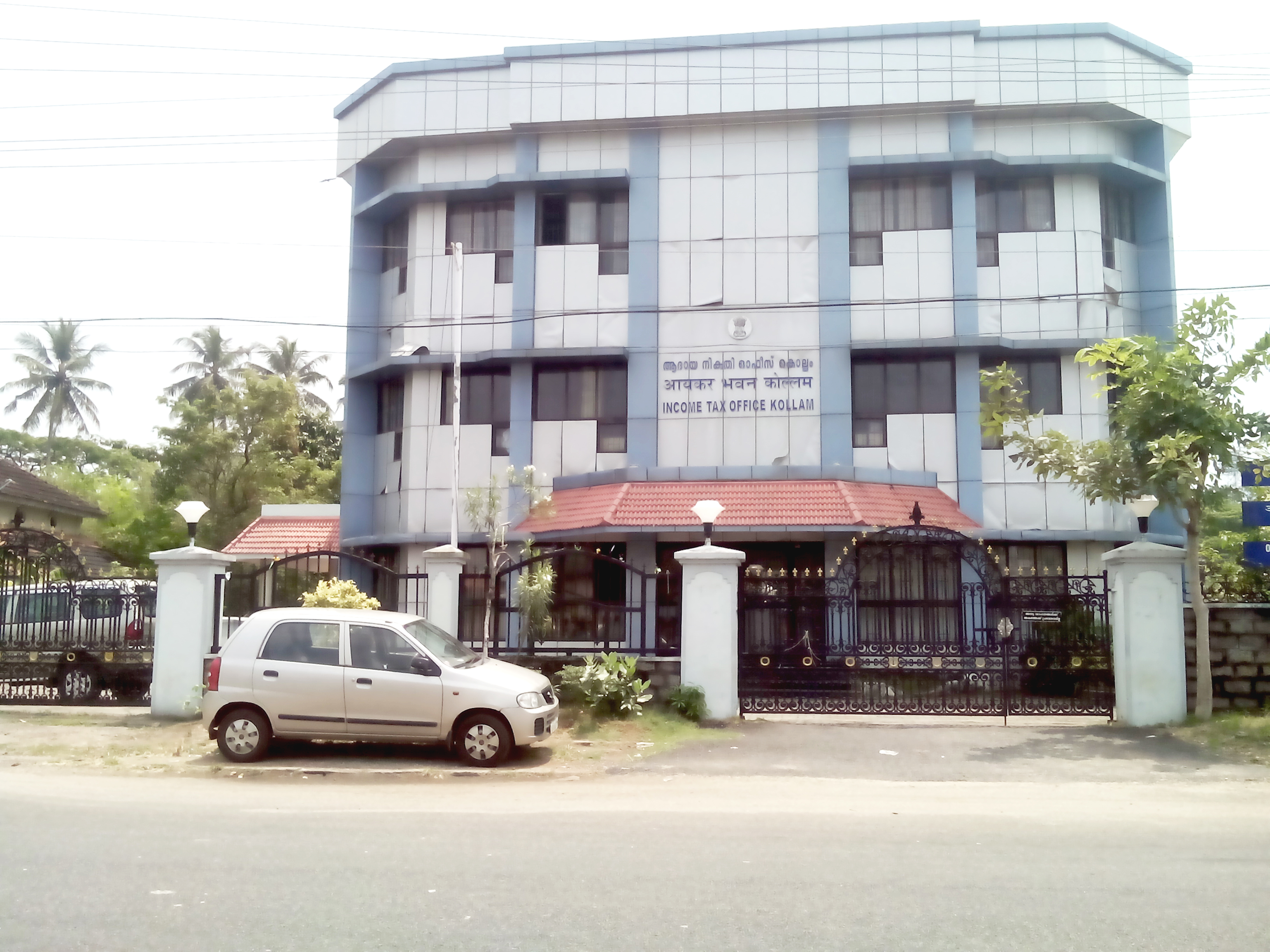
Kollam Income Tax Office

The present Mayor of Kollam Corporation is Honey Benjamin of CPI.

The police administration of the city falls under the Kollam City Police Commissionerate which is headed by an IPS (Indian Police Service) cadre officer and he reports to the Inspector General of Police (IGP) Thiruvananthapuram Range. The police administration comes under the State Home Department of the Government of Kerala. Kollam City is divided into three subdivisions, Karunagappally, Kollam and Chathannoor, each under an Assistant Commissioner of Police.

=== Urban structure ===
With a total urban population of 1,187,158 and 349,033 as city corporation's population, Kollam is the fourth most populous city in the state and 49th on the list of the most populous urban agglomerations in India. As of 2011 the city's urban growth rate of 154.59% was the second highest in the state. The Metropolitan area of Kollam includes Uliyakovil, Adichanalloor, Adinad, Ayanivelikulangara, Chavara, Elampalloor, Eravipuram (Part), Kallelibhagom, Karunagappally, Kollam, Kottamkara, Kulasekharapuram, Mayyanad, Meenad, Nedumpana, Neendakara, Oachira, Panayam, Panmana, Paravur, Perinad, Poothakkulam, Thazhuthala, Thodiyoor, Thrikkadavoor, Thrikkaruva, Thrikkovilvattom, and Vadakkumthala.

The Kerala Government has decided to develop the City of Kollam as a "Port City of Kerala". Regeneration of the Maruthadi-Eravipuram area including construction of facilities for fishing, tourism and entertainment projects will be implemented as part of the project

== Kollam district ==
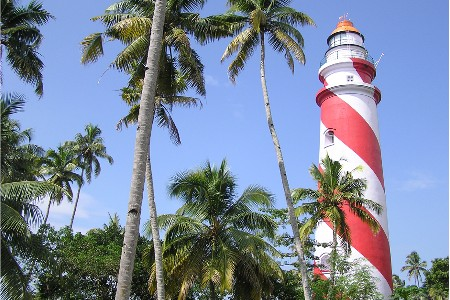
Lighthouse, Thangasseri, Kollam

The history of the district's administration can be traced back to 1835, when the Travancore state consisted of two revenue divisions with headquarters at Kollam and Kottayam. When Travancore and Cochin were combined into Travancore-Cochin, Kollam was one of the three revenue divisions. When the state of Kerala was formed in 1957, Chenkotta taluk was merged with the state of Madras. Later in 1957, the Cherthala, Ambalapuzha, Mavelikara, Karthikapalli, Chengannur and Thiruvalla taluks (formerly in Kollam district) were united to form the new district of Alappuzha. In 1983, Pathanamthitta taluk and nine villages of Kunnathur taluk were removed from Kollam district to form the new Pathanamthitta district.

=== District administration ===
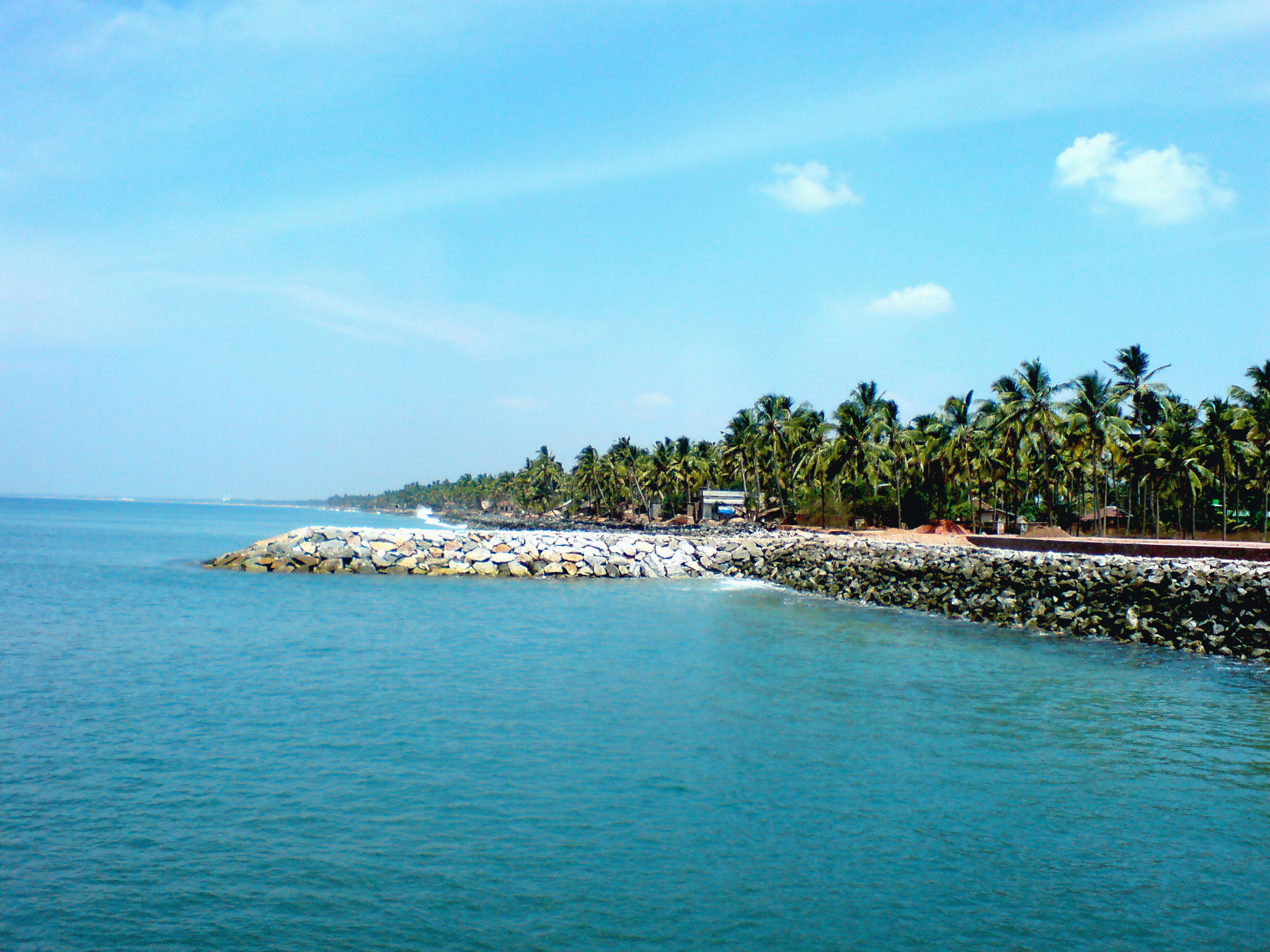
Paravur estuary: Scenic beauty of backwaters and beaches

Kollam district has six administrative subdivisions (taluks): Pathanapuram (new taluk), Punalur, Kunnathur, Kottarakkara, Karunagappally and Kollam. The district collector, a key functionary of the government, heads the district administration. The district collector is the agent of government and chief administrator of the district and reports to the state government. Among other tasks, maintaining law and order is a priority for district collector. The district collector is also the head of the Land Revenue Department of the district. The district has one revenue division, with its headquarters at Quilon. For administrative purposes, Kollam district is divided into 6 taluks, 11 blocks, 68 Panchayats, 1 corporation, 4 municipalities and 104 villages. The Kollam Civil Station was built in 1956 to incorporate all government offices in one place.

=== Police administration ===
Police administration in Kollam is divided into two districts: urban and rural. The City Police is headed by a City Police Commissioner, an IPS (Indian Police Service) officer with the rank of SP; its headquarters is at Kollam. The rural police is headed by the Rural Superintendent of Police (SP), with its headquarters at Kottarakkara. Both heads report to the Inspector General of Police (IGP), Thiruvananthapuram Range (Kerala)

The Kollam City Police is divided into three subdivisions, each under an Assistant Commissioner of Police (ACP): Karunagappally, Kollam and Chathannoor. Each subdivision is divided into circles, headed by the Circle Inspector of Police. Each circle is divided into a number of police stations, headed by a Sub-Inspector of Police. The Kollam Rural Police District is divided into two subdivisions, each under a Deputy Superintendent of Police (DySP): Kottarakkara and Punalur. There are a total of 29 police stations, in 13 circles. Kollam city traffic is controlled by the City Traffic Police, with a Traffic Police Station located near the Asramam Ground. Kerala's first coastal police station was established in Neendakara, Kollam.

The first police museum in India (The Sardar Vallabhbhai Patel Police Museum ) has a large collection of police artefacts and rare photographs. The museum has a room dedicated to officers killed in the line of duty. The forensic section has a large collection of photographs. The museum is located at the Kollam East Police Station.

=== Taluks ===
Kollam is administratively divided into 6 taluks. They are Kollam, Karunagappally, Kunnathur, Kottarakkara, Punalur and Pathanapuram, which are subdivided into 104 villages. The tahsildar is the revenue official in charge of each taluk.

Taluk	Headquarters
Kollam Taluk	Kollam
Karunagappally Taluk	Karunagappally
Kunnathur Taluk	Sasthamkotta
Kottarakkara Taluk	Kottarakkara
Punalur Taluk	Punalur
Pathanapuram Taluk	Pathanapuram

=== Municipalities ===
There are four municipalities in Kollam District. Punalur, Paravur, Karunagappally and Kottarakkara are the municipalities. There is a long-standing demand for upgrading Pathanapuram & Anchal panchayaths into municipal status.

== Kollam (Lok Sabha constituency) ==
Kollam Lok Sabha constituency (Malayalam: കൊല്ലം (ലോക്‌സഭാ നിയോജകമണ്ഡലം) (formerly Quilon Lok Sabha constituency) is one of the 20 Lok Sabha constituencies in Kerala state in southern India.

== Assembly segments ==
Before delimitation of parliamentary constituencies, Kollam Lok Sabha constituency was composed of the following assembly segments:

1. Kunnathur (SC)
2. Karunagapally
3. Chavara
4. Kundara
5. Kollam
6. Eravipuram
7. Chathanoor

After delimitation of parliamentary constituencies in 2008, presently Kollam Lok Sabha constituency comprises the following assembly segments:

1. Chavara
2. Punalur
3. Chadayamangalam
4. Kundara
5. Kollam
6. Eravipuram
7. Chathannoor

=== Corporations and municipalities coming under Kollam Lok Sabha constituency ===
- Kollam - Corporation
- Paravur - Municipality
- Punalur - Municipality

== Members of Parliament ==
From Quilon cum Mavelikara constituency in Travancore-Cochin:

- 1951: N. Sreekantan Nair, Revolutionary Socialist Party

From Quilon/Kollam constituency in Kerala:

- 1957: Kodiyan, Communist Party of India
- 1962: N. Sreekantan Nair, Revolutionary Socialist Party
- 1967: N. Sreekantan Nair, Independent
- 1971: N. Sreekantan Nair, Revolutionary Socialist Party
- 1977: N. Sreekantan Nair, Revolutionary Socialist Party
- 1980: B.K. Nair, Indian National Congress (I)
- 1984: S. Krishna Kumar, Indian National Congress
- 1989: S. Krishna Kumar, Indian National Congress
- 1991: S. Krishna Kumar, Indian National Congress
- 1996: N. K. Premachandran, Revolutionary Socialist Party
- 1998: N. K. Premachandran, Revolutionary Socialist Party
- 1999: P. Rajendran, Communist Party of India (Marxist)
- 2004: P. Rajendran, Communist Party of India (Marxist)
- 2009: N. Peethambarakurup, Indian National Congress
- 2014: N. K. Premachandran, Revolutionary Socialist Party

== Indian general election, 2014 ==
2014 Indian general election : Kollam
Party	Candidate	Votes	%	±%
RSP	N K Premachandran	408,528	46.47%	N/A
CPI(M)	M A Baby	370,879	42.19%	−3.00%
BJP	P M Velayudhan	58,671	6.67%	+2.27%
NOTA	None of the above	7,876	0.90%	−−−
Margin of victory		37,649	4.28%	+1.95%
Turnout		879,056	72.12	
UDF hold		Swing		

== See also ==
- Kollam district
- List of constituencies of the Lok Sabha
- Indian general election, 2014 (Kerala)
- 2014 Indian general election
