= Kollam metropolitan area =

Kollam metropolitan area Kollam urban agglomeration
- Urban agglomeration
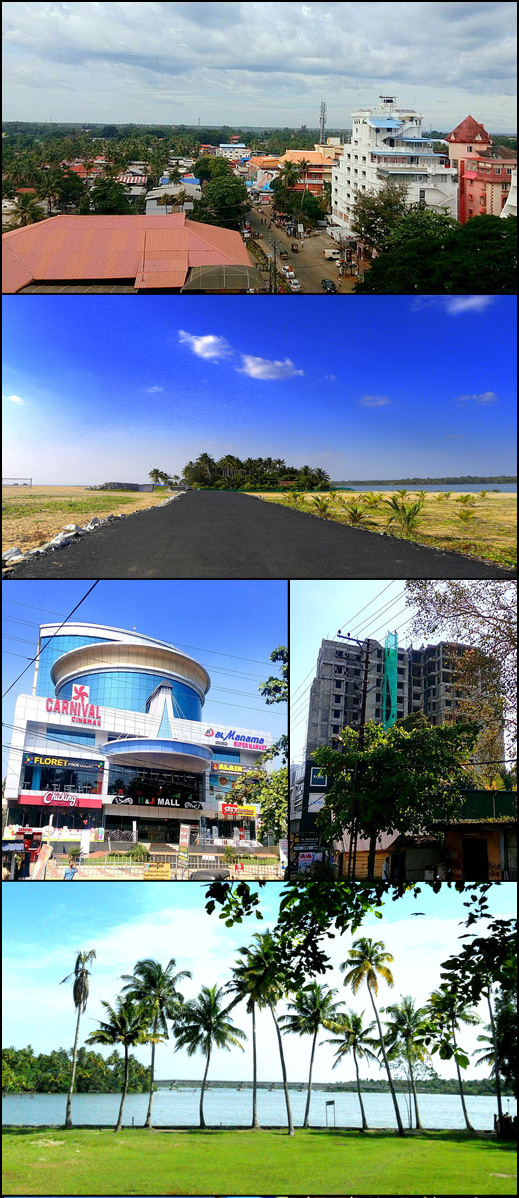
- From top clockwise: Aerial view of Residency Road in Kollam city, Coastal Road in Paravur, A high-rise apartment building in Ramankulangara, Ashtamudi Lake view from Chavara, H&J Shopping Mall in Karunagappally
- Nickname: KMA
- Location in India
- Coordinates: 8.88°N 76.60°E
- Country: India
- State: Kerala
- District: Kollam

Government
  - Body: City Corporation of Kollam

Area
  - Total: 364.51 km^{2} (140.74 sq mi)

Population (2015)
  - Total: 1,351,000
  - Density: 3,706/km^{2} (9,599/sq mi)
  - Metro rank: 48th

Languages
  - Official: Malayalam, English
- Time zone: UTC+5:30 (IST)
- Vehicle registration: KL-02(Kollam), KL-23(Karunagappalli), KL-24(Kottarakkara), KL-25(Punalur), KL-61(Kunnathur), KL 15(KSRTC)
- GDP: ▲$13 Billion
- Sex ratio: 1095 ♂/♀
- Lok Sabha constituencies: Kollam, Mavelikkara(Part), Alappuzha(Part)
- Planning agency: Kollam Development Authority (KDA)
- Civic agency: City Corporation of Kollam

Kollam Metropolitan Area is the 4th largest Metropolis in Kerala and 14th largest urban agglomeration in South India. It is one of the 10 fastest growing cities in the world covering an area of 364.51 km^{2} (2015) with a 31.1% urban growth between 2015 and 2020 as per the survey conducted by Economist Intelligence Unit (EIU) based on urban area growth during January 2020.

The metropolitan area, constituted on the basis of 2011 census data, consists of Kollam Municipal Corporation (Quilon), 2 municipalities, 22 Panchayaths and parts of 2 Panchayaths. The two municipalities are Paravur and Karunagappalli. The 21 Panchayaths are Adichanalloor, Adinad, Ayanivelikulangara, Chavara, Elampalloor, Kallelibhagom, Kottamkara, Kulasekharapuram, Mayyanad, Meenad, Nedumpana, Oachira, Panayam, Panmana, Perinad, Poothakkulam, Thazhuthala, Thodiyoor, Thazhava, Thrikkaruva, Thrikkovilvattom, and Vadakkumthala. Outgrowth of Neendakara, Eravipuram and Thrikkadavoor panchayaths are also included in the Kollam metropolitan area.

== Constituents of the urban agglomeration ==
No.	Location	Type
1	Kollam	City corporation
2	Thrikkadavoor	Outgrowth (Merged to city corporation)
3	Eravipuram	Outgrowth (Merged to city corporation)
4	Neendakara	Outgrowth
5	Paravur	Municipality
6	Karunagappalli	Municipality
7	Adichanalloor	Census Town
8	Adinad	Census Town
9	Ayanivelikulangara	Census Town
10	Chavara	Census Town
11	Elampalloor	Census Town
12	Kallelibhagom	Census Town
13	Kottamkara	Census Town
14	Kulasekharapuram	Census Town
15	Mayyanad	Census Town
16	Meenad	Census Town
17	Nedumpana	Census Town
18	Oachira	Census Town
19	Panayam	Census Town
20	Panmana	Census Town
21	Perinad	Census Town
22	Poothakkulam	Census Town
23	Thazhuthala	Census Town
24	Thodiyoor	Census Town
25	Thrikkaruva	Census Town
26	Thrikkovilvattom	Census Town
27	Vadakkumthala	Census Town

== See also ==
- List of million-plus urban agglomerations in India
- List of most populous urban agglomerations in Kerala
- List of cities and towns in Kerala
