= Pallikkal River =

River in Kerala, India

Pallickal (also known as Pallikkal River) is a river in Kerala, India. It rises from the lower foothills of the Western Ghats near Kodumon at an elevation less than +60 MSL, north-east of Adoor. The river has a length of 42 km with a drainage area of 220 square kilometres and falls into the Vattakayal Lake near Karunagappally. The Pallikkal Ri-ver originates from Kodumon in Pathanamthitta and ends at Kannetti Lake in Kar-unagappally flowing over 42 km.

== Course ==
The Pallickal River originates from the lower foothills of the Western Ghats near Kodumon, Pathanamthitta district. It initially flows through several towns towards the west. It passes through the towns of Adoor, Vadakkathukavu, Peringanad, Nellimukal, Nooranad, Pallickal, Sooranad, Pavumpa, Pavumpa-Churuli, Thodiyur, Vadakkumthala, Kuttivattom, Mynagapally, Karunagapally, Ayanivelikulangara and Kandathil. at reaching Ponmana near Karunagapally the river empties into the Arabian Sea through Ashtamudi Lake.

The flow of Pallikkal River and Pavumpa stream together forming the Vattakayal Lake which is surrounded by Pavumpa, Pavumpa - Churuli, Pavumpa-Manappally and Thodiyur. Pavumpa-Churuli, one of the most beautiful places Karunagappaly is lying in between the Vattakkayal and Pallikal river (Pallikkalaru).

In October 2022, the Kerala government's Major Irrigation department rejuvenated the river in Kollam district. The 42-km long river passes through the district. In the first phase, 200 metres from Thazhava and Sooranadu North were proposed to be cleaned. The large mud banks formed during floods at many parts from Manalikkal polder to Erottu canal and thick bushes that were affecting the flow of the river will be cleard.

=== Accident ===
In July 2023, three people from Kollam district including a newly married couple died after falling off from a cliff into the Pallikkal river.
