= Kollam City Police =

Law enforcement agency in the Indian city of Kollam

Kollam City Police കൊല്ലം സിറ്റി പോലീസ്
- Official logo of Kollam City Police

- The official flag of Kerala Police
- Motto: "മൃദു ഭാവെ, ദൃഢ കൃത്യേ"; Mridu Bhave Dhrida Kruthye; Soft Temperament, Firm Action

Agency overview
- Formed: 1 March 2011
- Preceding agency: Kollam District Police
- Employees: 439

Jurisdictional structure
- Operations jurisdiction: Kollam Metropolitan Area (Kollam city, Karunagappally and Chathannoor divisions), Kollam, India
- Population: 1,110,668
- Legal jurisdiction: Kollam Metropolitan Area (Kollam City, Karunagappally & Chathannoor)
- General nature: Local civilian police

Operational structure
- Overseen by: Government of Kerala
- Headquarters: The Office of the Commissioner of Police, Udayamarthandapuram, Kollam
- Elected officer responsible: Ramesh Chennithala, Minister for Home and Vigilance, Govt of Kerala
- Agency executive: Hemalatha M IPS, Commissioner of Police (District Police Chief, Kollam City)
- Parent agency: Kerala Police
- Units: List: Anti-Goonda Squad; City Special Branch; Coastal Police Station; Control Room; Crime Detachment; Custodial facilitation Centre; District Armed Reserve; District Crime Records Bureau; Dog Squad; Foreigners Registration Office; Forensic Science Lab; Marine Enforcement Unit; Special Branch (SB); Traffic Enforcement Unit; Women Police (Vanitha Cell)
- Sub Divisions: 3: Kollam City; Karunagappally; Chathannoor

Facilities
- Police Stations: 18
- District Jails: 1
- Sniffer Dogs (Bomb and Narcotics)s: 3

Notables
- Award: ISO 9001 certification for excellence in office functioning and maintaining high levels of quality control in day-to-day activities (Jan 2018)

Website
- Kollam City Police – Official website

The Kollam City Police is the law enforcement agency concerned with the maintenance of law and order in the Indian city of Kollam and the municipalities of Karunagappalli (Karunagappally division) and Paravur(Chathannoor division) along with several towns in Kollam district. Kollam City Police is the first ISO 9001 certified law enforcement agency in Kerala state and second one in India. The Kollam City Police has about 2,200 officers and handles an average of 35000 cases per year.

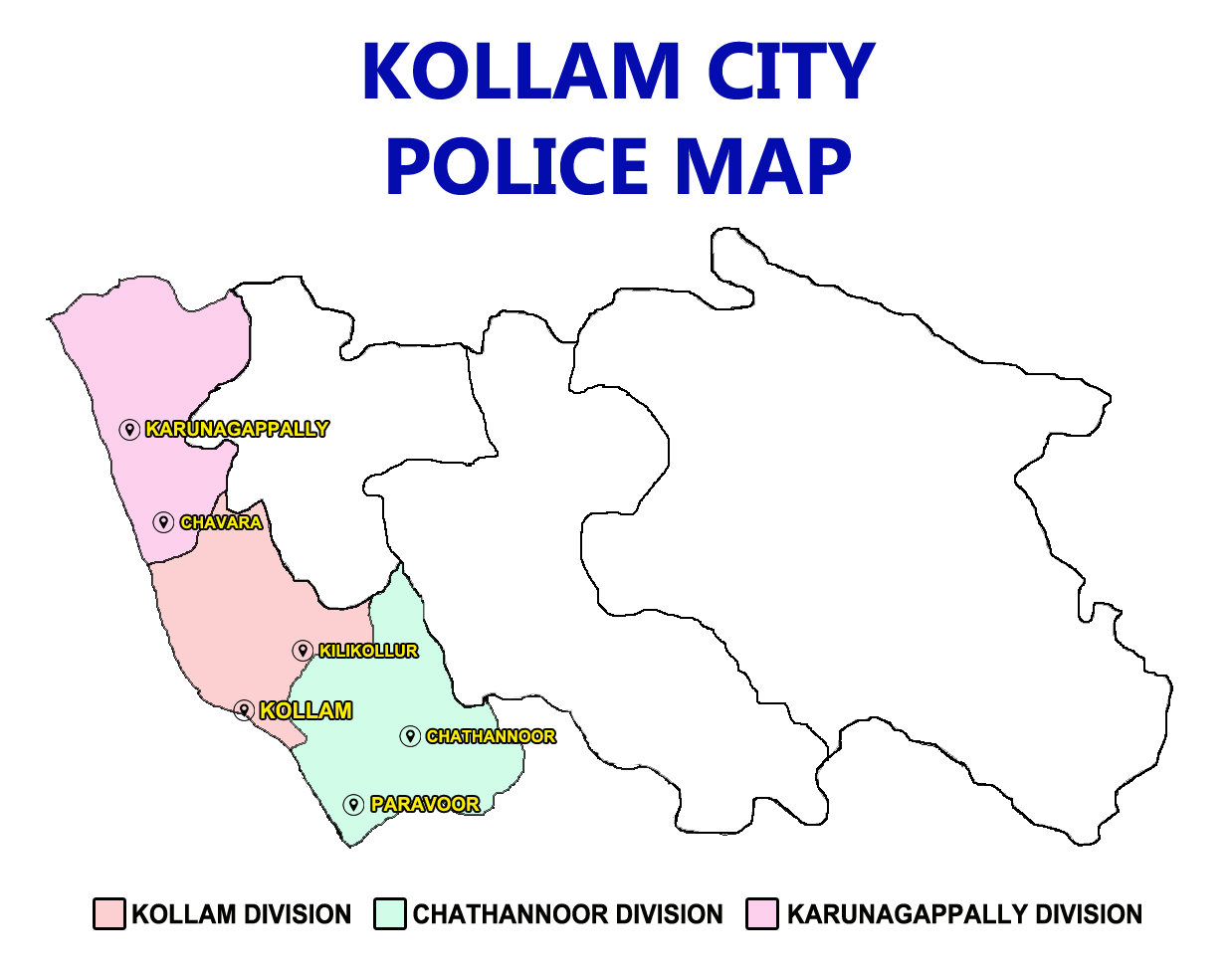
Jurisdiction area map of Kollam City Police

== History ==
In the pre-independence era, Kerala was divided into princely states of Travancore and Cochin and the Malabar region for the smooth administration. There was no Commissionerate in Kollam until 2011. The whole district police was administered by DySP of Kollam, Karunagappally, Kottarakkara and Punalur. As per the Government Order no 32/2011/Home dated 5 February 2011, Kollam district police was divided into Kollam Urban Police District (Kollam City Police) and Kollam Rural Police District. The City Police is headed by a City Police Commissioner(CP), with its headquarters at Kollam. The Police Commissioner holds the rank of Superintendent of Police (SP) and is from the IPS cadre. The rural police is headed by the District Police Chief (DPC), with its headquarters at Kottarakkara. Both heads report to the Deputy Inspector General of Police (DIGP), Thiruvananthapuram Range (Kerala). The Kollam City Police came into existence on 1 March 2011 following the division of the Kollam District Police force into the Kollam City Police and the Kollam Rural Police.

== Location ==
The office of the Kollam's City Police Commissioner is situated near the Armed Reserve Police Force camp in Kollam Cantonment.

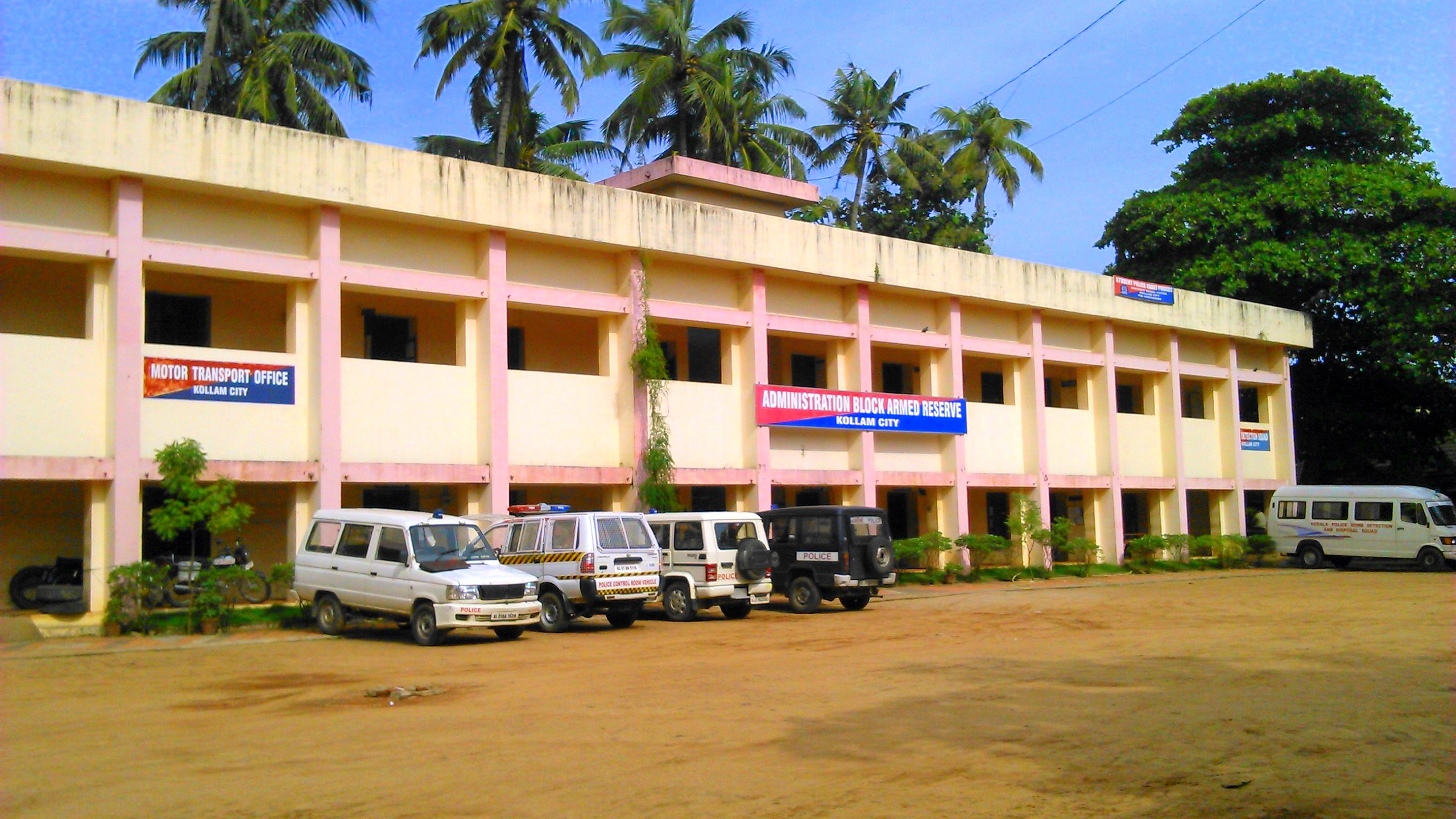
Armed Reserve Police Camp

== Administrative divisions ==
There are a total of 20 police stations under the control of Kollam City Police, 11 of which are under the control of the Kollam Division with 5 further stations under Chathannoor division and 4 under Karunagappally division.

=== Kollam Sub Division ===
- Kollam East Police Station
- Kollam West Police Station
- Pallithottam Police Station
- Anchalummoodu Police Station
- Sakthikulangara Police Station
- Eravipuram Police Station
- Kilikollur Police Station
- Kollam Traffic Enforcement Unit
- Kollam East Women Police Station
- Cyber Crime Police Station
- Neendakara Coastal Police Station

=== Chathannoor Sub Division ===
- Paravur Police Station
- Chathannoor Police Station
- Kottiyam Police Station
- Kannanalloor Police Station
- Parippally Police Station

=== Karunagappally Sub Division ===
- Karunagappally Police Station
- Oachira Police Station
- Chavara Police Station
- Chavara Thekkumbhagom Police Station

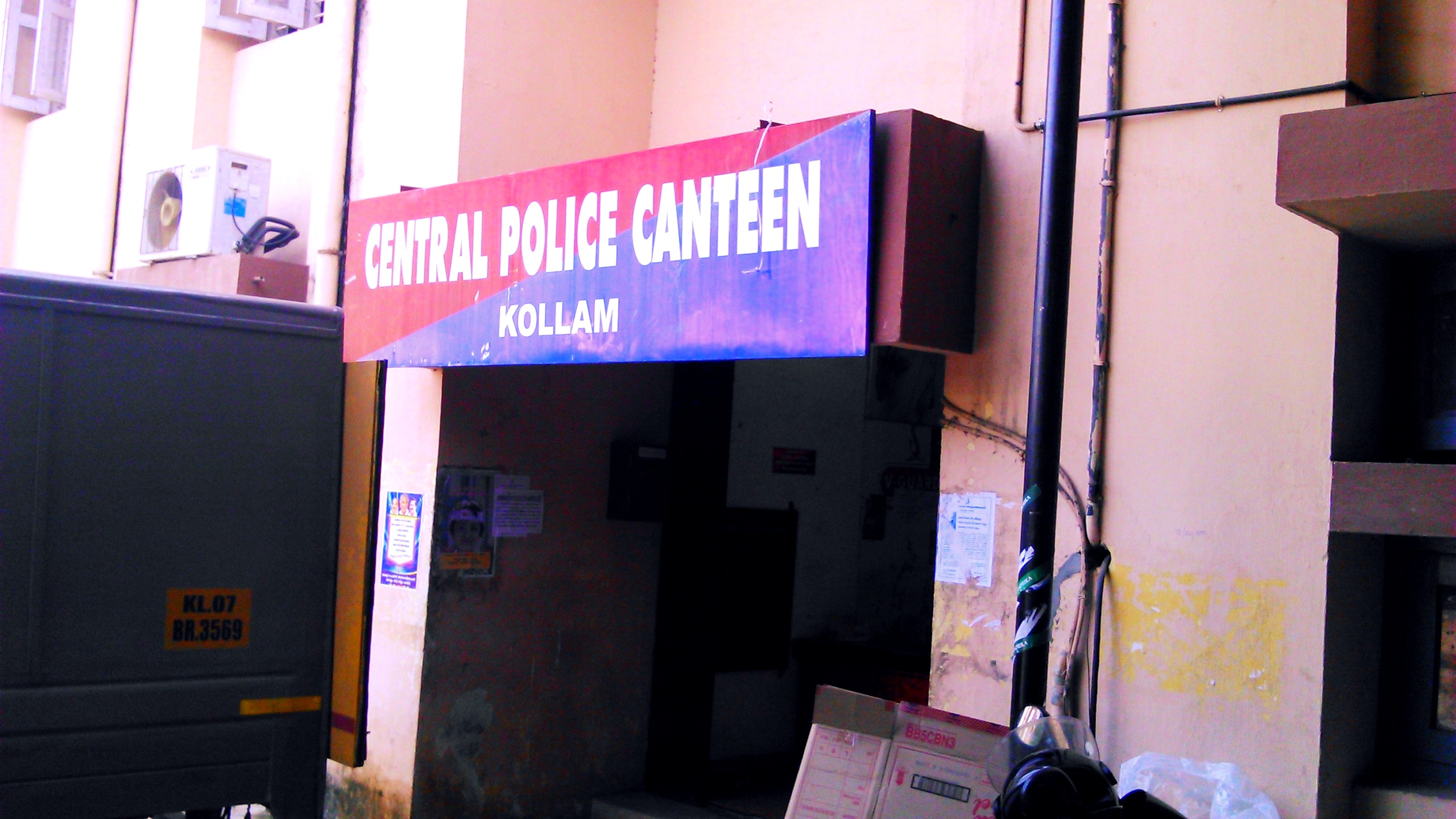
Central Police Canteen in Kollam City

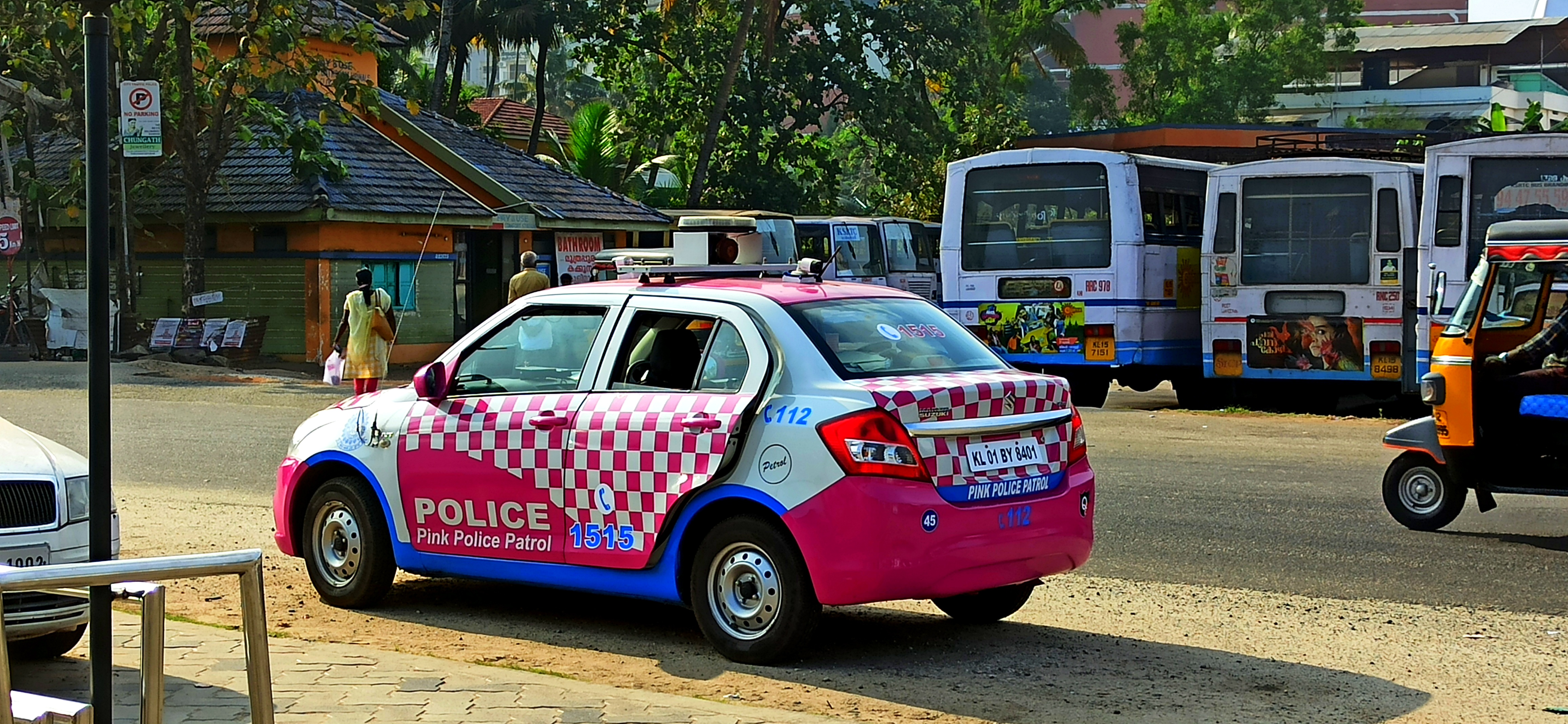
Pink Patrol team

== Special Units ==
- District Headquarters Camp (DHQ) - Armed Reserve Police of the Kollam City Police, headed by a Deputy Commandant. It mainly deals with crowd control, escort duty, personal security, etc.
- District Special Branch (DSB) - Intelligence wing of the Kollam City Police, headed by an Assistant Commissioner.
- C-Branch (formerly known as Dist. Crime Branch) - Special crime investigation wing of the Kollam City Police, headed by an Assistant Commissioner.
- District Crime Records Bureau (DCRB) - Maintains and analyses district crime and criminal data, headed by an Assistant Commissioner.
- Police Control Room - Coordinates police response and emergency communications, headed by an Assistant Commissioner (Special Branch). There are Control Room Vehicles (CRVs) for responding emergencies and police assistance.
- Narcotics Cell - Investigates and prevents drug-related offences, headed by an Assistant Commissioner.
  - DANSAF - Operational wing of the Narcotics Cell.
- City Traffic Police - Regulates traffic and enforces road safety laws in city limits.
  - Traffic Enforcement Units (TEU) - field level unit of the traffic police, headed by an Inspector of Police.
- Pink Police Patrol - Special patrol unit consisting of women officers, ensuring safety of women and children.
- Highway Police - Road safety enforcement unit in national and state highways.
- Coastal Police Stations - Responsible for coastal security, headed by an Inspector/SHO.
- Cyber Crime Police Station - Responsible for cyber crime investigation, headed by an Inspector/SHO.

== City Police Commissioners ==
The Office is presently headed by Smt. Kiran Narayanan IPS, (Note: The administrators are subject to change from time to time. The Commissioner of Police, Kollam City, holds the rank of Superintendent of Police (SP), as per the government. The official designation of the Commissioner is District Police Chief, Kollam City.) Commissioner of Police, who is an Indian Police Service (IPS) officer, as administrative control vests with the Home Ministry of Kerala.

Departments such as administration, the District Crime Records Bureau (DCRB), District Crime Branch, District Special Branch and Narcotic Cell are each headed by an Assistant commissioner.

- N. Gopalakrishnan IPS (1 March 2011 – 20 June 2011)
- T.J Jose IPS [DIG] (20 June 2011 – 9 January 2012)
- Gopesh Agrawal IPS [DIG] (9 January 2012 – 4 February 2012)
- Sam Christy Daniel [Addl. Charge] KPS (4 February 2012 – 21 February 2012)
- Debesh Kumar Behera IPS (21 February 2012 – 27 August 2014)
- V. Suresh Kumar IPS (27 August 2014 – 29 April 2015)
- P. Prakash IPS (29 April 2015 – 13 June 2016)
- S. Satheesh Bino IPS (13 June 2016 – 6 June 2017)
- Ajeetha Begum IPS (7 June 2017 – 17 January 2018)
- A. Sreenivas IPS (17 January 2018 – 8 May 2018)
- Arul B. Krishna IPS (8 May 2018 – 8 October 2018)
- P. K. Madhu IPS (8 October 2018 – 8 June 2019)
- Merin Joseph IPS (8 June 2019 – 18 September 2019)
- P. K. Madhu IPS (20 October 2019 – 17 January 2020)
- T. Narayanan IPS (18 January 2020 – 10 July 2022)
- Merin Joseph IPS (11 July 2022 – 10 November 2023)
- Vivek Kumar IPS (11 November 2023 – 14 August 2024)
- Chaitra Teresa John IPS (15 August 2024 – 31 December 2024)
- Kiran Narayanan IPS (1 January 2025 – present)

== Developments ==
- A dedicated complex at Asramam for the district police dog squad was inaugurated by Harshita Attaluri, the then Superintendent of Police on 2 March 2010. The facility cost ₹7 lakh (US$7,500) and can accommodate four dogs. The dog squad currently consists of three dogs. On 3 November 2016, a 10-member team of anti-goonda squad has been formed in Kollam city police. The team will supposedly be headed by a sub inspector.
- On 2 February 2021, Kerala's first district forensic science laboratory started functioning at Chathannoor in Kollam district. Physics, Biology and Chemistry, divisions started initially and a cyber forensic division will also be started in the lab shortly.

The first ISO 9001 accredited School in Kollam District, Kerala is Kalima International school .This Educational Institution located at Oyoor Roaduvila, Near Travancore Engineering College.
