= Pannisseri Nanu Pillai =

Indian writer

Pannisseri Nanu Pillai (September 11, 1885 - August 20, 1942) was an Indian poet, researcher, ascetic, critic, and artist specializing in the Indian classical dance-drama genre known as Katakali.

== Biography ==
He was born in 1885 to Padmanabha Kurup and Bhavaniamma at Pannissery house, South Maruthoorkulangara village in Karunagappalli taluk, Kollam District, Kerala. His father died when Pillai was eight and after his mother died, when he was eleven, he was raised by his brother and his uncle. He was educated in the village primary school and then in Kollam High School, until his brother death. Outside school, he was taught Sanskrit by Karingattil Nanu Asan and he learned as an autodidact logic, grammar, poetics and drama. He eventually became a polyglot, with proficiency in different languages such as Malayalam, Sanskrit, English, Tamil, Hindi, Telugu, Kannada, Bengali, and Arabic.

In 1913 Pillai became a disciple of Neelakanda Teerthapada Swami and later he followed Chattampi Swami and was also close to Narayana Guru. Pillai could attain ‘Jnana Nishta’ by virtue of his acquired enlightenment of salvation. He secured the title ‘Vidyapanan’ after his treatise "The Objectivity of the Spirit".

By the initiative of Pillai, a mosque was established in Maruthoor Kulangara; moreover he also funded a village school, the temple renovation and the Sanskrit School at Puthiyakavu. He fought for low castes' right to enter in temples and against the partisan movement of Punnasseri Neelakanta Sharma.

He married Lakshmikuttyamma and had two children named Srinivasa Kurup and Thankamma.

He died on 20 August 1942. Mankompu Sivasankara Pillai is his disciple. A documentary of his life has been broadcast by Kairali TV.

== Literary contributions ==
Pillai composed four Kathakali attakathas - Nizhalkuttu, Bhadrakali Vijayam, Paduka Attabhishekam and Sankaravijayam - succeeding in radically changing and popularising the art form. Nizhalkuthu was enacted in temples and was a daring experiment, with two unheroic rustic characters, the ‘Malayan' and ‘Malayathi’, when convention dictated the use only of mythical characters of heroic dimensions.

Paduka Pattabhishekam, which tells a story from Ramayana, was one of the subject of Malayalam textbooks and Sanskrit Pancham at school level in the 1940s.

Pillai's Bhadrakali Vijayam was influenced by Thottampattu - an ancient lyrical story told in folk song in Bhadrakali temples - and the Tamil epic Silappatikaram. Beyond the scripts for stage performance, he had also mastered stagecraft and had given training in stage performance for aspirants.

Pillai and his friend Vardhanam Krishna Pillai wrote the first Malayalam biography of Neelakanda Theertha Pada Swami, "The Complex History of Sree Neelakanda Theertha Pada Swami". He also did the Malayalam translation of the Sanskrit work Surya Satakam. He also wrote

- Markendeyam Prakaranam
- Sooryasatakam (translation)
- Chitrodayamani Bhashakavyam (translation)
- Vimarsana Sanchika
- Kathakali Prakaram, a seminal theoretical text for Kathakali. A. D. Boland referred this book while writing his book named "A guideto Kathakali"

He also focused on scripts concerning spiritual topics such as the translation of Chattampi Swamikal's Adibhasha from Tamil to Malayalam. His Sankara Vijayam (1941) records significant events in the life of Sankaracharya, the founder of Advaita philosophy. As a social reformer, Pillai had close ties with Islam and Xi'an theologists.
