= S. Saraswathi Amma =

Indian Radio Presenter and Program Producer (1933 - 2020)

- Born: February 19, 1933; Thazhava, Travancore, British India
- Died: January 15, 2020 (aged 86); Thiruvananthapuram, Kerala
- Occupations: Writer, Radio Presenter and Programme Producer
- Known for: Mahilalayam Radio programme
- Spouse: Yeshodharan
- Children: 3
- Parent(s): Kottukoyikal Velayudhan, Saradamma
- Awards: National Award for a Radio Programme (1985)

S. Saraswathi Amma (February 19, 1933 – January 14, 2020) was a Malayalam language writer, radio anchor and producer of the women's section programme on All India Radio in Kerala, India. Her popular radio series, “Manaswini Manavathi”, received the “National Award for a Radio Programme” in 1985.

== Biography ==
S. Saraswathi Amma was born on February 19, 1933, at Thazhava in present-day Karunagappalli, Kollam district to Kottukkoyikkal Velayudhan, who was a freedom fighter, and a disciple, and biographer, of Sree Narayana Guru, and Saradamma.

Saraswathi Amma studied at S. N. College, Kollam for intermediate course in 1948 and later joined for BA Economics at the same college. She later studied law at Government Law College, Thiruvananthapuram which functioned at Ernakulam during the first year of her course. She was active in the arts and culture sector during her college days. Before getting graduation certificate from law college, she worked among women for a year and formed a women's association called “Mahila Samajam”. After completing her training in law, in 1957 she enrolled as an advocate, practicing in Kollam.

=== Personal life and death ===
Saraswathi Amma was married to Yeshodharan, with whom she had and raised three children: Maya Priyadarshini, K. K. Y. Harikrishnan and Gopi Krishnan. She died on January 14, 2020, at the age of eighty-six at their residence in Thiruvananthapuram while undergoing treatment for age-related ailments.

== Career ==
Saraswathi Amma joined All India Radio, Thiruvananthapuram station in 1965 as the producer of the women's section programs. She got the job at All India Radio while she was gaining fame as a lawyer. She came to All India Radio at a time when programs for women were minimal. She introduced the idea of a special program for women on All India Radio and started a program called Sthreekalkk Mathram [For Women Only]. Later, she revived the Mahilalayam a women's program in the All India Radio, and became the producer and presenter of it. At a time when programs for women were rare, she was reimagining the program Mahilalayam, including women's literary works, plays, and success stories of famous women in various fields. After becoming the presenter of Mahilalayam, people affectionately called her Mahilalayam Chechi (meaning elder sister).

Saraswathi Amma received national award in 1985 for her radio program Manaswini Manavathi. It was a program to identify and involve the underprivileged working class women in the society. After presenting this program from the Delhi station, it was proposed to be broadcast on radio stations in other states of India.

At a time when Malayali women who were active in the literary field were rare, Saraswathi Amma started the radio program 'Masika', through which she provided an opportunity for unknown ordinary women writers to grow.

Saraswathi Amma was also behind the formation of children's choirs in schools under the leadership of All India Radio. She later became deputy station director of All India Radio, and retired in 1987.

== Contributions ==
Akasathile Nakshatrarangal [Stars in the Sky] is a memoir written by S. Saraswathi Amma about her twenty-six-year career at All India Radio. She has also authored books such as, Pookkalum Kunjungalum [Flowers and Kids], Kuppichillum Rosadalamnum [broken glass pieces and Rose Petals], and Ammamar Arinjirikkan [For mothers to know].

Saraswathi Amma wrote Vanithakalkk Mathram [For Women Only], a column for women in Mangalam Weekly and also wrote the Vanithavedi column, another female-centric column, in the Malayala Manorama weekly for two decades.

== Awards and honors ==
The program Manaswini Manavathi by her received a national award in 1985.
