= Karunagappally LPG Tanker Accident =

The Karunagappally LPG Tanker Accident occurred on December 31, 2009, at Puthentheruvu Junction on National Highway 47 (now NH 66) near Puthentheruvu near Karunagappally in the Kollam district of Kerala, India.

== Accident ==
A bullet tanker lorry carrying 18 tonnes of Liquefied Petroleum Gas (LPG) from Kochi to the Indian Oil Corporation (IOC) bottling plant in Parippally collided with a car travelling from Trivandrum International Airport toward Ochira. The impact caused the lorry to overturn, detaching the driver's cabin from the storage tank. The outlet safety valve cracked during the crash, leading to a major high-pressure gas leak that blanketed the immediate area in a thick vapor cloud

Local residents, police officers, and fire personnel rushed to the scene to conduct rescue operations. Shortly after, a spark—believed to have been generated when a police jeep ignition was turned on—ignited the gas cloud, triggering a massive vapor cloud explosion. Flames rose to an estimated 50 feet.

14 people died (three on impact, with others succumbing to severe burn injuries later), and over 20 individuals suffered injuries. National Highway 47 was blocked for over 10 hours following the explosion. Eighteen shops and four houses were destroyed in the explosion. Forty-five second-hand motorcycles that were kept for sale at one of the shops in the vicinity and a police jeep were burnt.
