= Samuel Gnanamanickam =

Indian agriculture scientist

Samuel S. Gnanamanickam
- Born: 18 July 1945 (age 81); Kannanallur, Tamil Nadu, India
- Education: Agricultural College and Research Institute Coimbatore, India; University of Hawaiʻi
- Known for: Studies in Plant pathology
- Scientific career
- Fields: Plant pathology
- Workplaces: National Academy of Agricultural Sciences; American Phytopathological Society; Indian Council of Agricultural Research

Samuel S. Gnanamanickam (born July 18, 1945) is an Indian plant pathologist. He is known for his research on diversity of rice pathogens, molecular breeding of indica rices for disease resistance and for developing superior strains of beneficial strains of rhizosphere bacteria for biological control of rice diseases. He is a fellow of the National Academy of Agricultural Sciences and National Academy of Biological Sciences of India and was chair of the biological control committee at the American Phytopathological Society.

== Early life and education ==
Gnanamanickam was born in Kannanallurr, Tamil Naduu, India, on July 18, 1945. He acquired a bachelor's and master's degree from Agricultural College and Research Institute Coimbatore, India, class 1969, and obtained his PhD degree in Plant Pathology from the University of Hawaiʻi in Honolulu, class 1976. He then earned a postdoctoral fellowship from Natural Sciences and Engineering Research Council of Canada, and worked for Agri-Food Canada.

== Career ==
Gnanamanickam has been associated with the University of Madras and was professor of plant pathology since 1898. He was also among the visiting scientists and a professor on a Biotechnology Career Fellowship visits to University of Hawaiʻi, Kansas State University, and University of Wisconsin. Since 2004, he has been recognized as an adjunct professor of plant pathology at the University of Arizona, Tucson.

== Selected publications ==
=== Articles ===
- PATIL, SURESH S.; GNANAMANICKAM, SAMUEL S. (1976). "Suppression of bacterially-induced hypersensitive reaction and phytoalexin accumulation in bean by phaseotoxin". Nature. 259 (5543). Springer Science and Business Media LLC: 486–487. Bibcode:1976Natur.259..486P. doi:10.1038/259486a0. ISSN 0028-0836. S2CID 4219301.
- Sakthivel, N.; Gnanamanickam, S. S. (1987). "Evaluation of Pseudomonas fluorescens for Suppression of Sheath Rot Disease and for Enhancement of Grain Yields in Rice (Oryza sativa L.)". Applied and Environmental Microbiology. 53 (9). American Society for Microbiology: 2056–2059. Bibcode:1987ApEnM..53.2056S. doi:10.1128/aem.53.9.2056-2059.1987. ISSN 0099-2240. PMC 204057. PMID 16347428.
- Rajebhosale, M. D.; Chowdari, K. V.; Ramakrishna, W.; Tamhankar, S. A.; Gupta, V. S.; Gnanamanickam, S. S.; Ranjekar, P. K. (1997). "DNA fingerprinting of Indian isolates of Xanthomonas oryzae pv. oryzae". Theoretical and Applied Genetics. 95 (1–2). Springer Science and Business Media LLC: 103–111. doi:10.1007/s001220050537. ISSN 0040-5752. S2CID 46126601.
- Krishnamurthy, K; Gnanamanickam, S.S (1998). "Biological Control of Rice Blast byPseudomonas fluorescensStrainPf7–14: Evaluation of a Marker Gene and Formulations". Biological Control. 13 (3). Elsevier BV: 158–165. doi:10.1006/bcon.1998.0654. ISSN 1049-9644.
- Viji, G.; Gnanamanickam, S.S.; Levy, M. (2000). "DNA polymorphisms of isolates of Magnaporthe grisea from India that are pathogenic to finger millet and rice". Mycological Research. 104 (2). Elsevier BV: 161–167. doi:10.1017/s095375629900194x. ISSN 0953-7562.
- Narayanan, N. N.; Baisakh, N.; Vera Cruz, C. M.; Gnanamanickam, S. S.; Datta, K.; Datta, S. K. (2002). "Molecular Breeding for the Development of Blast and Bacterial Blight Resistance in Rice cv. IR50". Crop Science. 42 (6). Wiley: 2072–2079. doi:10.2135/cropsci2002.2072. ISSN 0011-183X.
- Narayanan, Narayanan N.; Baisakh, Niranjan; Oliva, Norman P.; VeraCruz, Casiana M.; Gnanamanickam, Samuel S.; Datta, Karabi; Datta, Swapan K. (2004). "Molecular breeding: marker-assisted selection combined with biolistic transformation for blast and bacterial blight resistance in Indica rice (cv. CO39)". Molecular Breeding. 14 (1). Springer Science and Business Media LLC: 61–71. doi:10.1023/b:molb.0000037995.63856.2d. ISSN 1380-3743. S2CID 21969308.
- Velusamy, Palaniyandi; Immanuel, J Ebenezar; Gnanamanickam, Samuel S; Thomashow, Linda (2006-01-01). "Biological control of rice bacterial blight by plant-associated bacteria producing 2,4-diacetylphloroglucinol". Canadian Journal of Microbiology. 52 (1). Canadian Science Publishing: 56–65. doi:10.1139/w05-106. ISSN 0008-4166. PMID 16541159.
- Taheri, Parissa; Gnanamanickam, Sam; Höfte, Monica (2007). "Characterization, Genetic Structure, and Pathogenicity of Rhizoctonia spp. Associated with Rice Sheath Diseases in India". Phytopathology. 97 (3). Scientific Societies: 373–383. doi:10.1094/phyto-97-3-0373. hdl:1854/LU-362279. ISSN 0031-949X. PMID 18943659.

=== Books ===
- Gnanamanickam, S. S. (2002). Biological control of crop diseases. New York: Marcel Dekker, Inc. ISBN 0-203-91095-8. OCLC 49529926..
- Gnanamanickam, S. S. (2006). Plant-associated bacteria. Dordrecht: Springer. ISBN 978-1-4020-4536-3. OCLC 209936037.
- Gnanamanickam, S. S. (2009). Biological control of rice diseases. Dordrecht London: Springer. ISBN 978-90-481-2464-0. OCLC 437346580.
- Gnanamanickam, S. S. (2023). Rice Blast Disease: Contributions to Biological Disease Management and the Biopesticide Industry. Copyright (c) 2023. Samuel Gnanamanickam.

== Honors ==
Gnanamanickam is the recipient of the Tamil Nadu Scientist Award.
