= H&J Mall =

Shopping Mall in Karunagapally, Kerala

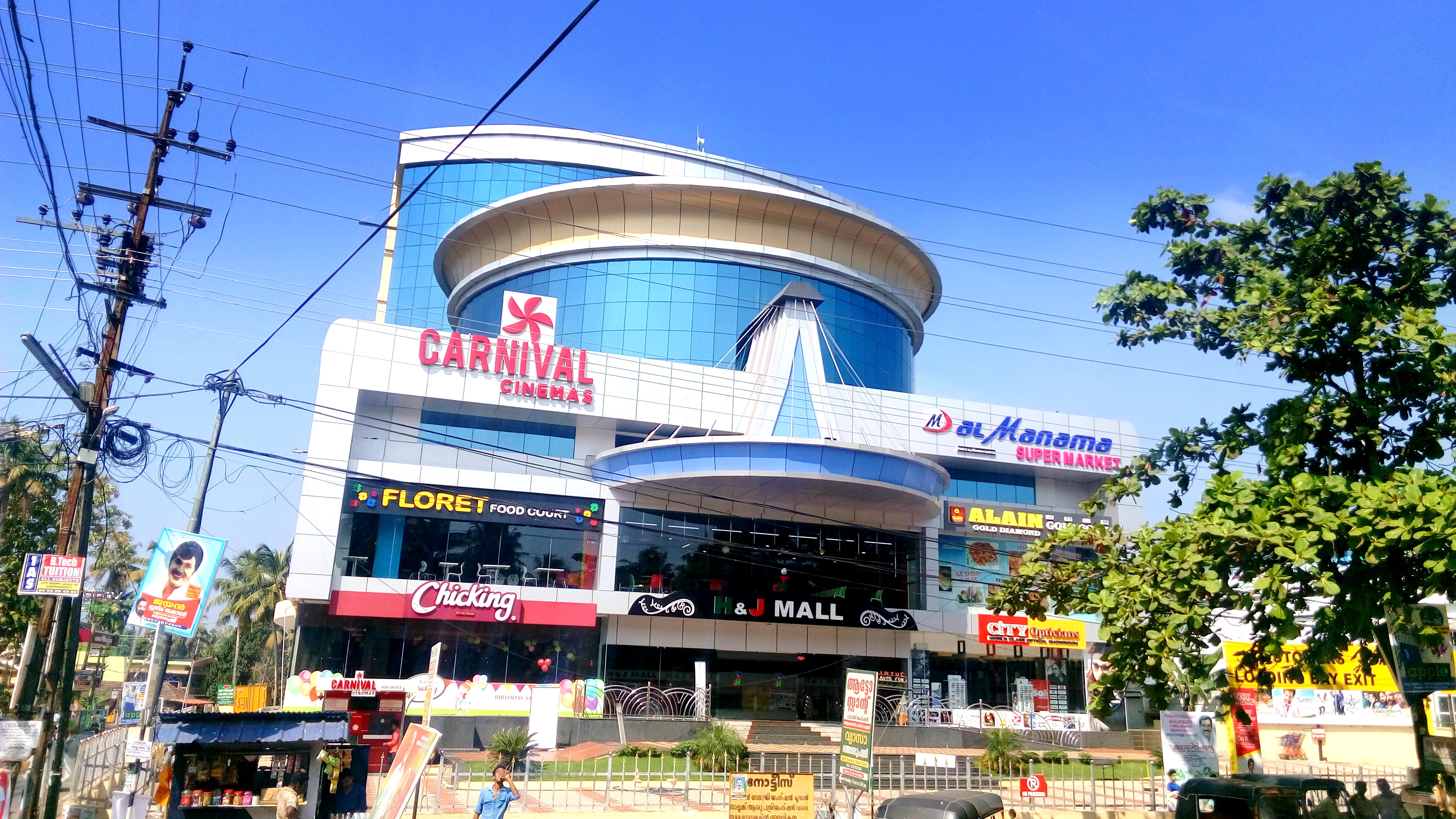
- H&J Mall
- Location: Karunagappally, Kollam, India
- Coordinates: 9.049393°N 76.535552°E
- Address: Lalaji Junction
- Owner: Hameedu Kunju
- Num. of stores: 25 +
- Floor area: 130,000 sq ft (12,000 m^{2})
- Floors: 10
- Website: www.hnjmall.com

The H&J Mall is a shopping mall in Karunagappally in Kollam Metropolitan Area, India. The mall is owned by the NRI business man from the Karunagappally, Mr. Hameed Kunju. The Mall is standing on the centre of the bustling trading town Karunagappally. It is the second shopping mall in Kollam Metropolitan Area. H&J Mall was inaugurated by film actor Mammootty on 29 March 2015. The 130,000 sq ft (12,000 m^{2}) 10-story mall is one of the important shopping destinations in Karunagappally. It features a My Cinemas theater, dining area, escalator and two lifts.
