= Pulimukham Devi Temple =

Hindu temple in Kerala, India

Pulimughathu Sree Bhadra Bhagavathi Temple
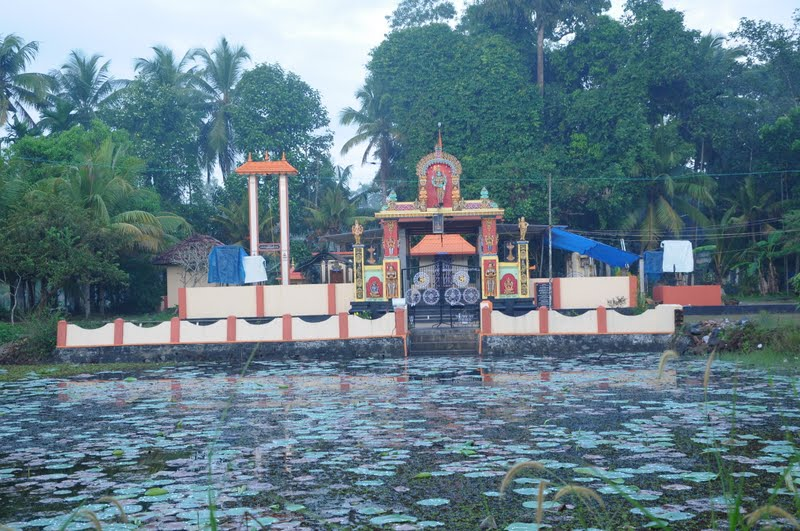

- Pulimukhathu Sree Bhadra Bhagavathy Temple, Thazhava, Kollam, Kerala

Religion
- Affiliation: Hinduism
- District: Kollam
- Deity: Bhadra Bhagavathi
- Festivals: Parayeduppu, Meena Bharani, Pongala
- Governing body: Pulimukham Temple Trust

Location
- Location: Thazhava
- State: Kerala
- Country: India
- Interactive map of Pulimughathu Sree Bhadra Bhagavathi Temple
- Coordinates: 9°05′35.0″N 76°33′12.7″E

Architecture
- Type: Traditional Kerala style
- Completed: 400 years old

Specifications
- Temple: One
- Elevation: 33.74 m (111 ft)

Pulimukam Temple is a Hindu temple located in Thazhava neighbourhood in the Kollam district of Kerala, India. Bhadra Bhagavathi is the presiding deity of the temple. The temple is situated at about 5 km north of Karunagappally and is reachable by National Highway 47.

== Upadevatas ==
There are many Upadevathas (Sub-deities) adjacent to the temple, and a few Prathishtas were either revamped or added according to the Deva Prashnam by expert astrologers recently. The main upadevathas in the temple premises are Yakshi, Ganesha, Nagaraja, Naga Yakshi and Rekshas.

A Kavu (a patch of small forest which houses the serpent Gods), Karimbana tree and Ezhilam Pala tree are also worshipped on the belief that they house Gandharvas and Yakshis.

== Festivals ==
The temple celebrates a number of festivals as follows:

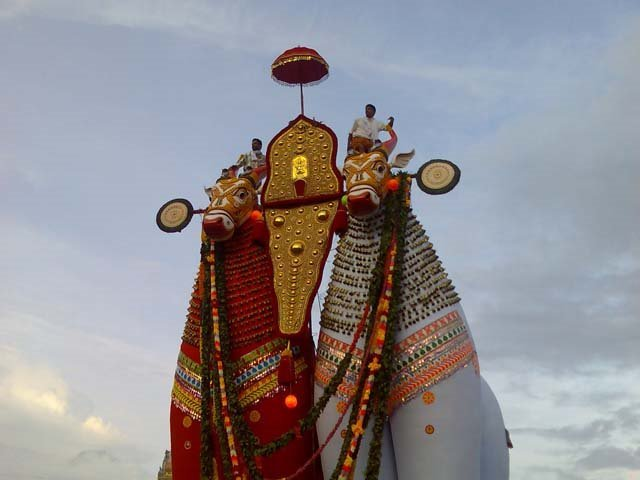
Kettukazhcha

Parayeduppu

In the numerous temples of Onattukara, the Parayeduppu period is the festive season. It all begins when the deity of Pulimukham temple is taken out in procession for Parayeduppu. The main part of Parayeduppu is the Jeevatha constructed in the model of the temple structure itself. This box-like carriage for the deity rests on two teakwood poles about two meters long, and is in the form of a palanquin. The front resembles Thidambu behind which is a kind of pettakam (small chest) built as per Thachusaasthra calculations. Up front is a woollen cloth embroidered with shining, colourful pictures and gold trinkets. Behind that is kept the deity's holy dress, starched and pleated, and decorated with small golden pieces. 3days long visit to the homes of people who lives in her Karas.

The rhythms used during Jeevatha Ezunnallathu (procession) are quite noteworthy. Starting with very slow beats, it builds up a crescendo and ends in fast beats.

Meena Bharani

The major festival at Pulimukham is Meena Bharani. This is in the month of march or April. The date is determined according to the Malayalam Calendar KollaVarsham. The "Pulimukham Bharani" is in the month of Meenam and the day which has the star Bharani and hence the name Meena Bharani. The highlight of the festival is Kuthiyottam and Kettukazhcha and Khosha Yatra and Pongala.

Pongala

Pongala festival.

A morning visit to the temple will give you impressions of the festival, from the glowing faces of the devotees who throng the temple since the dawn.

== See also ==
- List of Hindu temples in Kerala
- Temples of Kerala
- Thazhava
