= Kureeppally =

Village in Kollam District, Kerala, India

Kureeppally is a small village in Kollam district, India. It is exactly 6 km from both Kottiyam and Kundara, and lies on the Kundara-Kottiyam road. It consists of areas under the Thrikkovilvattom and Nedumpana Panchayats.

The "pally" in the name translates as "church", and there are more than seven churches in a 2 kilometres (1.2 mi) radius. It also has many temples and mosques nearby. The landmark of Kureeppally is Mukhathala Saint Stephen's Orthodox Church, which is almost 100 years old.

Mukhathala Marthoma Church is another main Syrian Christian church in Kureeppally.

Earlier, the place was called Kurishupalli, and gradually it became Kureeppally, by word of mouth.

The people there consist of Hindus, Muslims and Christians.
