= Kannanalloor =

Village in India

Kannanalloor കണ്ണനല്ലൂർ
- Village
- Location within Kerala
- Coordinates: 9.0927°N 76.8612°E
- Country: India
- State: Kerala
- District: Kollam
- Taluk: kollam

Government
  - Type: local self government
  - Body: Panchayath

Languages
  - Official: Malayalam
- Time zone: UTC+5:30 (IST)
- PIN: 691576
- Telephone code: 0474
- Vehicle registration: KL-02
- Kollam: Kollam, Paravoor, Varkala, Attingal
- Lok Sabha constituency: Kollam
- Assembly constituency: Kundara
- Literacy: 93.63%

Kannanalloor (Malayalam: കണ്ണനല്ലൂർ) is a village situated in Thrikkovilvattom gramapanchayat in Kollam District, Kerala, India.

== Politics ==
Kannanalloor is a part of Kundara assembly constituency in Kollam (Lok Sabha constituency). Shri. P. C.Vishnunadh is the current MLA of Kundara. Shri.N. K. Premachandran is the current member of parliament of Kollam. CPM, INC, RSP, SDPI, BJP etc. are the major political parties.

== Geography ==
Kannanalloor is a small village in Thrikkovilvattom panchayat. It is 13 km from Kollam, 2 km from Mukhathala and 62 km from Thiruvananthapuram. It connects places Mylakkad, Nedumpana, Kottiyam, Palathara, Adichanalloor, etc.

== Demographics ==
Malayalam is the native language of Kannanalloor.
