= Pavumba =

- village
- Location in Kerala, India Pavumba (India)
- Coordinates: 9°3′35″N 76°53′20″E
- Country: India
- State: Kerala
- District: Kollam

Population (2011)
  - Total: 17,230

Languages
  - Official: Malayalam, English
- Time zone: UTC+5:30 (IST)
- Vehicle registration: KL-23
- Nearest city: Karunagappally (11 km)

Pavumba is a village in the outskirts of Kollam district, Pavumba is a village in Thazhava Panchayat located in the north-east of Karunagapalli taluk. It is bordered by Vallikunnam in the north, Todiyur in the south, Sooranad in the east, and Thazhava village in the Thazhava panchayat in the west. It is known as the place of weaving "Thãzhappaya" in the rural culture of Kerala. It is a border village of Kollam district and Alappuzha in the north starts from here. The name Pavumba is derived from the name "Pampin waa". Its history can still be seen in the Thrippavumba Mahadeva temple. Thrippavumba Mahadeva Temple is one of the major temples in Kerala. Other major temples in Pavumba are Azhakiyakavu Sreebhadrakalee temple Manappally North, Chirakkal Devi Temple,Manappally Parambathukulangara Sree Mahadevar (Pavumpa Kali) Temple, and Palamoodu Manikanda Sannidhi. Besides, a lot of family temples are also located here. The Ilavana Devi Temple (also known as the Ilavana Shri Durga Bhadra Devi Temple), situated in Pavumba North, Pavumba, Karunagappally, Kerala, is a prominent ancestral family temple associated with the Kaippally Kudumbam (Tharavadu), Pavumba North. The temple complex comprises Sarppakkavu, Moorthikkavu, and Mambra Malanada-which is dedicated to Maladaivam. Malakkuda Mahotsavam, a significant annual festival, is celebrated at Mambra Malanada and attracts a large number of devotees who participate in the festivities each year. The temple serves as an important spiritual and cultural center for the members of the Kaippally Tharavadu and the wider Hindu community. The temple and its associated properties are administered and governed by nominated and elected representatives chosen from among the members of the Kaippally Tharavadu. While the temple, its affiliated shrines, and sacred groves (kavus) are managed by members of the family, it remains open to all devotees of the Hindu faith. Members of the Kaippally Tharavadu and its devotees are primarily located across the districts of Alappuzha, Kollam, Pathanamthitta, and Thiruvananthapuram in Kerala, as well as in various other parts of India and abroad.

== Demographics ==
As of 2011 India census, Pavumba had a population of 17230 with 8059 males and 9171 females.
