= Vallikavu =

- Village
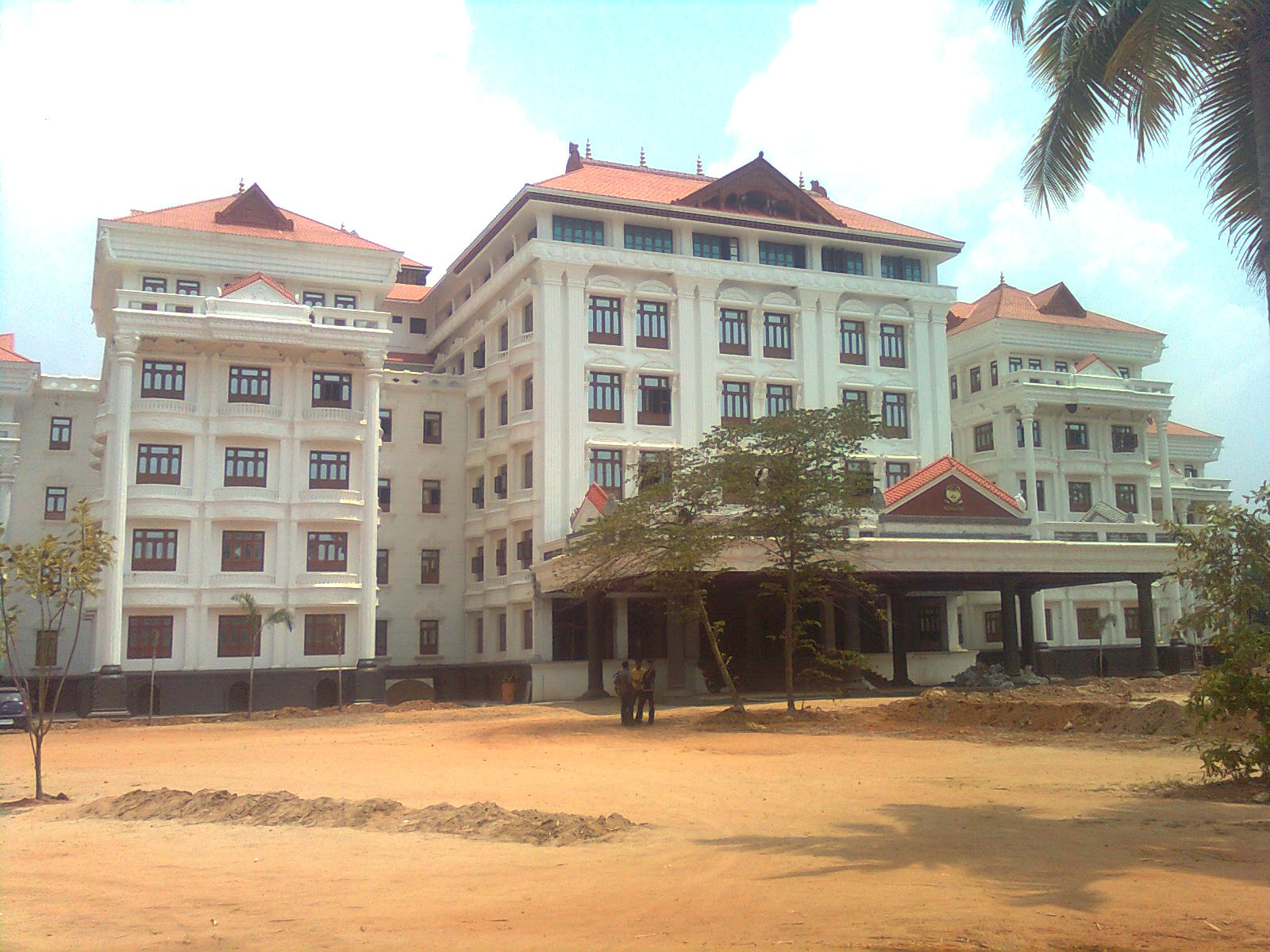
- Amrita Vishwa Vidyapeetham, Amritapuri Campus
- Interactive map of Vallikavu
- Coordinates: 9°8′0″N 76°38′0″E
- Country: India
- State: Kerala
- District: Kollam

Languages
  - Official: Malayalam, English
- Time zone: UTC+5:30 (IST)
- PIN Code: 690525
- Vehicle registration: KL-23
- Nearest city: Kollam
- Lok Sabha Constituency: Alappuzha
- Climate: Tropical Wet (Köppen)

Vallikavu is a small village in Kollam District of Kerala. Vallikavu is chiefly inhabited by farmers and fishermen. Fishermen here were traditional canoe builders, skilled at making Changadam Vallam (the present House-Boats) using planks and coir ropes to tie the planks together and coating the Vallam with melted pith. The Vallam making artisans have died and with the advent of motor transport the industry died.<fact>

Based in the village is a school on the Amritapuri campus.

The women used to collectively manufacture coir from the coconut, while few were engaged in making mats out of Screw Pine. The community and is located about 10 kilometres (6.2 mi) north-west of Karunagappally and 35 kilometres (22 mi) north of Kollam.

Vallikavu became world famous by the birth of Mata Amritanandamayi, the Hindu spiritual leader. Amrita Vishwa Vidyapeetham's Amritapuri Campus is situated here. Many people from different states and countries comes here for Amma's Dharshan. As many people came, Vallickavu developed to a small town in a short time span and shops, markets, textiles, etc. began to flourish. Many commercial banks set up their branches and the major one is the State Bank of India Vallikavu Branch on Cherukara Building.

== Transportation ==
Trivandrum International Airport is the nearest airport. Karunagappally railway station serves Vallikavu as the nearest Railway station. Regular buses connect the village with Ernakulam, Alappuzha, Karunagappally, Ochira and Kayamkulam.
