= KERAFED =

Indian federation of coconut farmers

Kerala Kerakarshaka Sahakarana Federation, Ltd.
- Company type: Public company
- Industry: Coconut products
- Founded: 1987; 39 years ago
- Headquarters: Thiruvananthapuram, Kerala, India
- Key people: M. A. Francis (Managing Director)
- Products: Coconut oil; Coconut Mash (Pinnacku); Desiccated coconut
- Revenue: ▲₹1.92 billion (US$20 million) (2009–2010)
- Net income: ▲₹54.3 million (US$570,000) (2009–2010)
- Number of employees: ~670
- Website: www.kerafed.com

KERAFED is the top-level co-operative federation of coconut farmers in the southern Indian state of Kerala. KERAFED is also a producer and marketer of products based on coconut. It is the third largest producer of coconut oil in India.

In July 2019, Minister for Agriculture V. S. Sunil Kumar launched the State-Level Raw Coconut Procurement Drive with the support of around 190 primary agriculture co-operative societies in Kerala. The latest procurement initiative would assure coconut farmers a supportive price of ₹27 per kilogram.

== History ==
The Government of Kerala established KERAFED in 1987 with the aim of assisting coconut farmers by procuring their produce and regulating marketing operations to address the price challenges they were facing

A production unit relating to the sector was created in 1991 to crush and market copra procured from the farmers at remunerative price to relieve the section of price crunch and to cater the edible oil requirement of the society by maintaining high quality standards.

During the financial year 2009–2010, KERAFED procured 24,500 metric tonnes of copra for its operations.

== Current operations ==
KERAFED has two expeller oil extraction facilities—one at Karunagappalli, Kollam and the other at Naduvannur, Kozhikode—and caters to about 500,000 consumers in Kerala through 14,000 retail outlets.

The oil complex in Karunagappalli, is the largest coconut oil mill in the sub-continent with an installed capacity of 20 tonnes per day (TPD) (7504 TPA, 2009–2010). The facility at Naduvannur provides a production of 7.5 TPD (2693 TPA, 2009–2010). Total production was about 10,000 metric tonnes during the year 2009–2010.

During this period, the facilities used 15,887 metric tonnes of copra and generated 5,111 metric tonnes of "pinnack" by-product.

== Products ==
Previous logo

"KERA" brand of coconut oil is sold in HDPE bottles of 100 ml, 200 ml and 500 ml; PET bottles of 1000 ml; and polythene pouches of 500 ml and 1000 ml.
