= Mukhathala =

- town
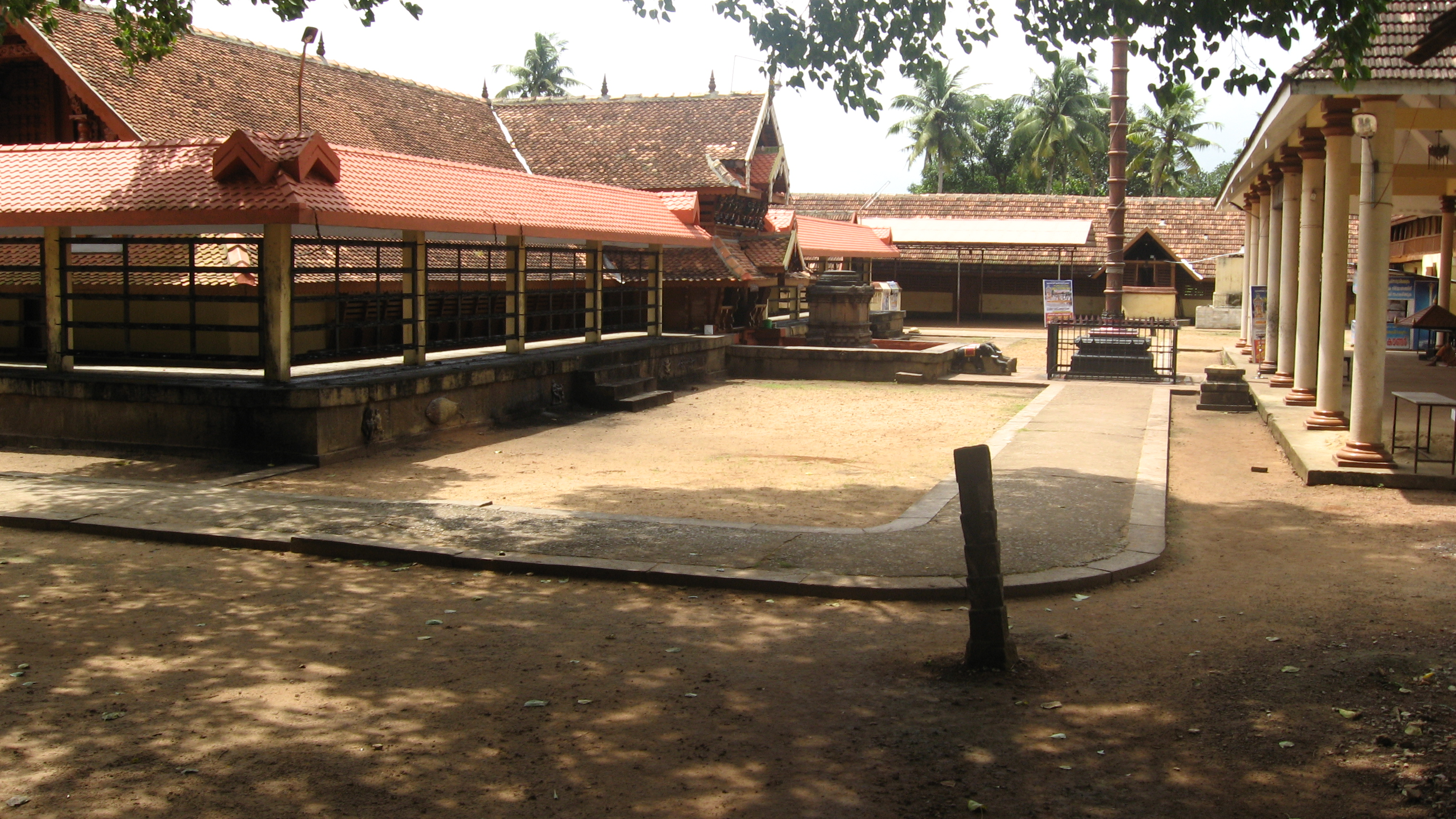
- Mukathala MurariTemple
- Interactive map of Mukhathala
- Coordinates: 8°53′49″N 76°40′2″E
- Country: India
- State: Kerala
- District: Kollam

Languages
  - Official: Malayalam, English
- Time zone: UTC+5:30 (IST)
- PIN: 691577
- Telephone code: 0474
- Vehicle registration: KL-02
- Nearest city: Kollam
- Sex ratio: 1012 ♂/♀
- Literacy: 90.82%
- Lok Sabha constituency: Kollam
- Climate: normal (Köppen)

Mukhathala is a small town and block panchayat in Kollam district of Kerala, India. As an important area in Kollam, the region is rich in agriculture products like, cashew nuts, coconuts, tapioca, pepper, areca, vegetables and most importantly, paddy. The region holds ‘Perumkulam ela' (second largest paddy field in the state).

The Mukhathala area's ancestry is historic, as attested to by the presence of temples such as Olayilkavu, Udayankavu, Kottavaidehikavu, Kulathoorkavu, Kandolikavu, Vamanankavu (Kavu is a grove connected with a temple of great ancestry) and of families like Thekkadath, Vadakkadath, Chittilakkad and Perumathi.

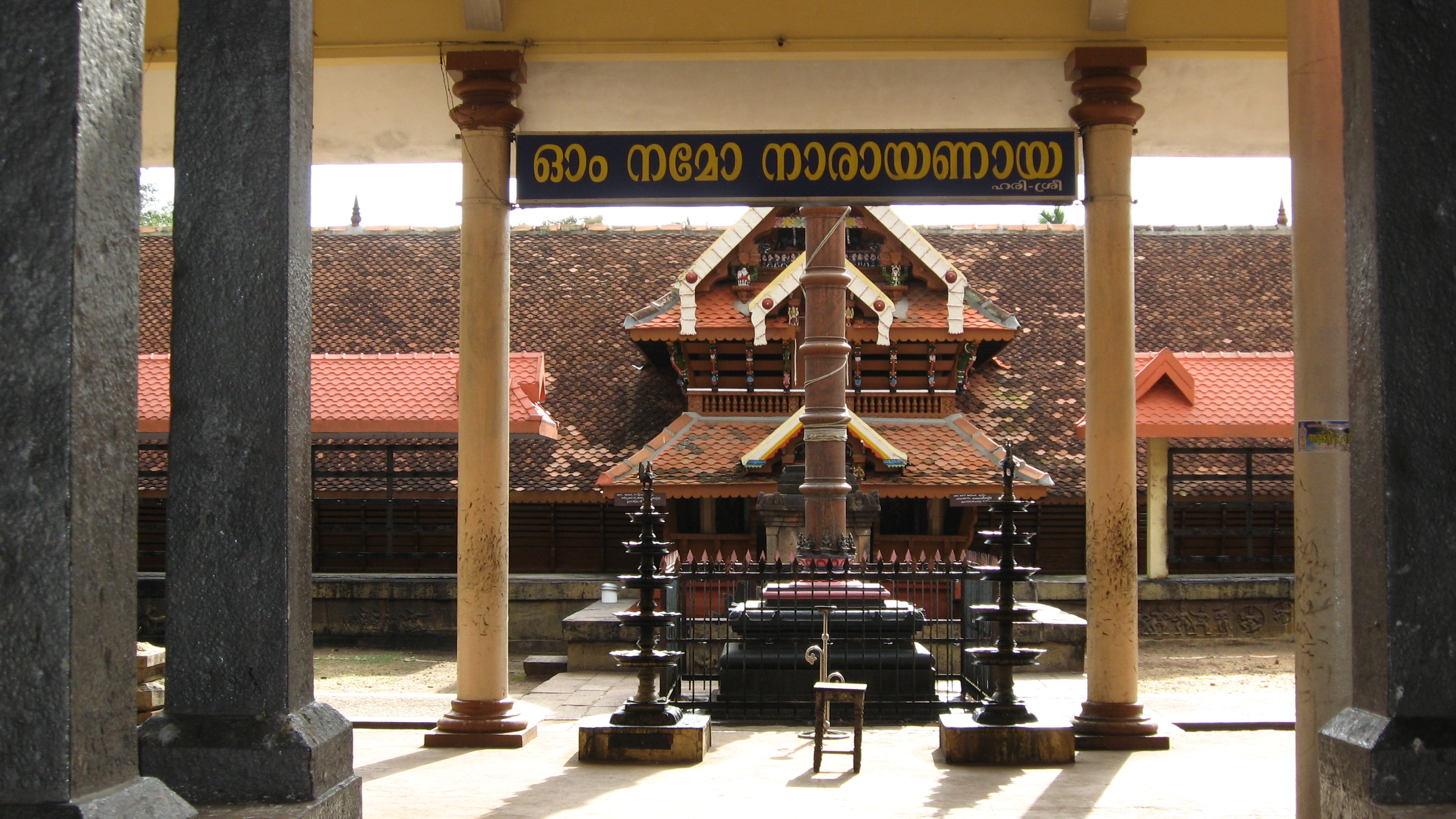
Mukhathala Murari temple

== Administration ==
Sam K. Varghese is the present President of the Mukhathala block panchayat. The panchayath includes 5 Grama panchayats and 18 divisions. The Grama panchayats include:

1. Mayyanad
2. Thrikkovilvattom
3. Kottamkara
4. Elampalloor
5. Nedumpana

The current president of the Thrikkovilvattom gram panchayath is Ajithkumar A.P.

== Transport ==
The nearest railway stations are Kilikkollur Station, 6 km Kollam junction station, 8 km Kerala State Road Transport Corporation bus services to nearby towns are available regularly. There is a Kollam-Kulathupuzha limited stop chain service every 20 min.

=== Schools ===
- St. Jude Higher Secondary School Kureeppally
- Mukhathala Gramodharana Trust High School
- National Public School
- Navdeep Public School
- Upasana Nursing College
- Indian Public School
- NSS School
- Govt. LP School
- Swaralaya Music & Dance school. Murahari junction.

== Places of worship ==
- The Pentecostal Mission Church (TPM Faith home), Mukhathala
- St Stephen Jacobite Syrian Orthodox Church Kureeppally
- Vamanankavu Kshethram, Panakkalam, Mukhathala.
- Mukhathala Sreekrishna Swami Temple
- Udayan Kaavu, Murari Jn, Mukhathala
- Ayyappa Temple, Opp. M.G.T.H.S, Mukhathala
- Mukhathala Marthoma Church Kureeppally
- Masjid Kannanalloor
- St George Orthodox Syrian Church (Kunnuvila pally)
- St Jude Church, mukhathala
- kalkulath shankara narayana temple thattarkonam

== Mukhathala Murari Temple ==
The Mukhathala village is known for the famous Murari Temple which holds a unique position in the cultural history of Travancore. The only Murari temple in Kerala, it houses a unique divine spirit and a single idol. This famous Sree Krishna Swami temple held a prominent position under the rule of Desinganadu king. The temple is approximately three thousand years old. The temple is situated in the 'Thrikkovilvattom' village on the Kollam-Kulathoorpuzha state highway side, nearly eight kilometers from the Kollam town.

Mukhathala Sreekrishnaswami Temple has its own glory and greatness, mainly because of the divinity enshrined in the Sanctum-Sanctorum (Sreekovil) of the temple, and the unique charm of the idol installed in it. The strength of the deity here is believed to be stronger than in other temples as no Upadevatas (subsidiary deities) are enshrined here. There is only a Yakshi Amma on the northern side of the temple.

The presiding deity in the 'Garbhagraha' (central shrine) is MahaVishnu. The people at large, however, invoke the Lord as "Murari". Mura-hari is Lord Vishnu after the slaying of ‘Muraasuran’. The surrounding area came to be known as Mukhathala as it was the place where the ‘Mukham’ (face) and the ‘Thala’ (head) of the Asura fell.

Some of its most prominent features include a large outer wall, the Anapanthal where, as part of traditional rituals, a caparisoned elephant stands bearing the idol of the Lord, and a copper-covered flag pole. There is also a special Balikkalpura, a square-shaped enclosure that is famous for maintaining an even temperature throughout the day. It never gets too hot or too cold because of its unique structure. The Vilakkumadam, where ceremonial lamps are fixed, and the Mandapam or the platform in front of the sanctum sanctorum, are other salient hallmarks of this mystical site.
