= Pallithottam =

- Neighbourhood
- Location within Kerala
- Coordinates: 8.875459°N 76.591302°E
- Country: India
- State: Kerala
- City: Kollam
- Time zone: UTC+5.30 (IST)
- Postal code: 691006
- Area code: 0474
- Lok Sabha constituency: Kollam
- Civic agency: Kollam Municipal Corporation
- Avg. summer temperature: 34 °C (93 °F)
- Avg. winter temperature: 22 °C (72 °F)
- Website: http://www.kollam.nic.in

Pallithottam is a neighbourhood of Kollam city situated at the coastal region. It is the 46th ward in Kollam Municipal Corporation. Pallithottam is totally depending on fishing activities and operations of Kollam Port.

== Significance ==
Pallithottam is considered as one among the 27 fishing villages in Kollam district. It is coming under the Central Zone-II of Kollam Municipal Corporation. The fisherman community of Pallithottam is using modern amenities for easing their work. As per the result of a survey conducted among the fishing villages of Kollam by Cochin University of Science and Technology in 2011, fisherman community from Pallithottam is the most educated fisherman community in Kollam. Global Positioning System(GPS), Sonars and Echo sounders, ICT gadgets, Mobile phones and updates from Radio Benziger 107.8 FM(a Kollam based FM radio) are used by this fishing community The Fishing villages of Pallithottam having a mixed picture of tradition and modernity.

Pallithottam is situated in a cluster of five fishing villages along a five kilometre coastline around a natural bay just south of Neendakara—the largest trawler harbour in Kerala. A full-fledged boat yard is functioning at Pallithottam. Few numbers of small plywood dinghies are working there at Pallithottam for fishing in the backwaters with the use of sails. The fisherman community of Pallithottam have demanded separate fish landing and auction hall facilities within the Tangassery harbour complex. Kollam Development Authority(KDA) had taken up a housing colony project for Pallithottam. A considerable number of members in South Indian Federation of Fishermen Societies(SIFFS) is from Pallithottam. A good number of the city's cable TV networking companies are based on Pallithottam One among the 17 police stations coming under the jurisdiction of Kollam City Police is situated at Pallithottam.

== Location ==
- Kollam Port - 2.2 km
- Kollam Beach - 300 m
- Kollam Junction railway station - 2 km
- Kollam KSRTC Bus Station - 2.7 km
- Andamukkam City Bus Stand - 1.4 km
- Paravur railway station - 12.7 km

== See also ==
- Chinnakada
- Kollam
- Kollam Beach
- Kollam Port
- Mundakkal
