= Elampalloor =

- Census Town
- Location in Kerala, India Elampalloor (India)
- Coordinates: 8°57′0″N 76°40′0″E
- Country: India
- State: Kerala
- District: Kollam

Area
  - Total: 13.99 km^{2} (5.40 sq mi)

Population (2011)
  - Total: 33,959
  - Density: 2,427/km^{2} (6,287/sq mi)

Languages
  - Official: Malayalam, English
- Time zone: UTC+5:30 (IST)
- Vehicle registration: KL-02

Elampalloor is an census town in Kollam district in the state of Kerala and is a part of Kollam Metropolitan Area, India. It is 12 km away from Kollam city, 23 km away from Paravur and 13 km away from Kottarakkara.

== Demographics ==
As of 2011 India census, Elampalloor had a population of 33959 with 16198 males and 17761 females.

== Public/Private Institutions near Elampalloor ==
- Kollam Technopark
- Aluminium Industries Limited (ALIND)
- The Kerala Ceramics Limited
- Kerala Electrical and Allied Engineering Co. Ltd. (KEL)
- Lakshmi Starch Ltd
