= Central Police Canteen =

State-owned retail chain in India

- Company type: State-owned
- Industry: Retail
- Founded: 26 September 2006
- Headquarters: East Block-07 (Level-II), Sector-1, Rama Krishna Puram, Delhi, India
- Area served: India
- Owner: Ministry of Home Affairs
- Website: cpcmha.gov.in

The Central Police Canteen (commonly abbreviated as the CPC), officially known as the Kendriya Police Kalyan Bhandar (transl. Central Police Welfare Stores), is a retail chain in India serving the active and retired personnel of the Central Armed Police Forces, the Central Police Organisations, and different state police forces and their families. Established on 26 September 2006 by an order of the Ministry of Home Affairs, the CPC works as an independent department under the Ministry. There are 119 master canteens and over 1,778 subsidiary canteens in the CPC system. Headed by an additional director general-rank officer, who is appointed by the Home Ministry on a rotation basis from the six CAPFs, the CPC is headquartered at Rama Krishna Puram, New Delhi. The routine affairs related to it are handled by its chief executive officer, who is a deputy inspector general-rank officer.

The products available at the CPC subsidiary canteens are not tax-exempt as they are in the Canteen Stores Department of the Ministry of Defence, and many petitions to the government have been made by different central and state organisations to extend such tax rebates to the CPC.

The CPC is in the process of promoting indigenous products following the call for Atmanirbhar Bharat by Prime Minister Narendra Modi.

== History ==
The Canteen Stores Department (CSD) under the Ministry of Defence provides its facilities primarily to the personnel of the Indian military. The Ministry of Home Affairs had proposed to expand its scope to include the members of different Central Armed Police Forces during the Atal Bihari Vajpayee government. Though the proposal was acceptable to the Prime Minister, it was opposed and rejected by the Ministry of Defence. In 2006 then-Prime Minister Manmohan Singh agreed with and acted upon a proposal to establish a new retail chain scheme for the personnel of CAPFs similar to the CSD. The Kendriya Police Kalyan Bhandar system was inaugurated on 26 September 2006 under the Ministry of Home Affairs.

== Structure ==
The Central Police Canteen comes under the control of the Ministry of Home Affairs and works as an independent department. It is governed by the Central Administrative Committee (CAC) headed by an additional director general-rank officer and includes six inspectors general from six different CAPFs. The primary objective of the CAC is to prepare and implement the standard operating procedures related to the functioning of the Kendriya Police Kalyan Bhandar system; it also works as a monitoring agency of the whole system. The Central Purchase Committee of the system is headed by an inspector general and includes five members of the rank of deputy inspector general. The purchase committee negotiates prices of the items retailed at CPCs with the different firms.

The heads of both the committees are appointed by the Ministry on a rotation basis from among the different CAPFs. Each committee is constituted for a period of two years, with members coming from different CAPFs nominated by their respective directors general. An officer of the rank of deputy inspector general discharges the role of chief executive officer to handle the routine affairs of the system and preside over the headquarters, known as the Central Office, situated at Rama Krishna Puram, New Delhi. There are a total of 119 master canteens directly under the Central Office and 1,778 subsidiary canteens throughout the country are at the end of the CPC system hierarchy which deal with customers.

== Beneficiaries ==
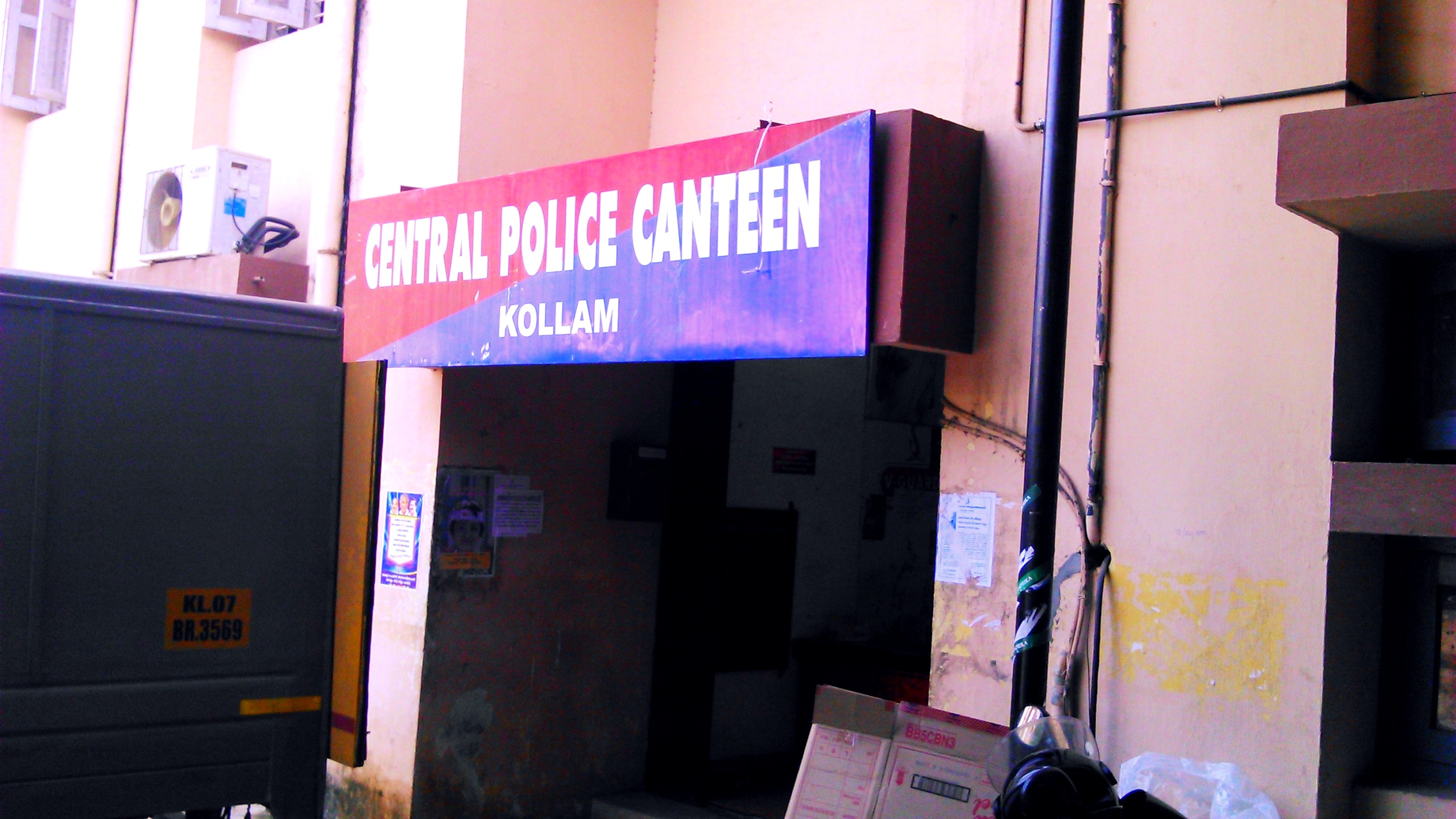
Subsidiary canteen at the Kerala Police Armed Reserve Police Camp, Kollam

After its inception in 2006, the Central Police Canteen provided its services only to the active and retired personnel of the different CAPFs and their family members. However, different police organisations in the country approached the Ministry of Home Affairs every so often to extend the facility of the CPC to include their personnel as well. Keeping such requests under consideration, the Ministry promulgated an order on 18 October 2011 to enlarge the scope of beneficiaries of the CPC facility to include active and retired members of the various Central Police Organisations, including the Intelligence Bureau, the Bureau of Police Research and Development, the National Crime Records Bureau and the National Investigation Agency, the Special Protection Group, the National Disaster Response Force and the Central Bureau of Investigation, various state police forces, and the employees of the Home Ministry with service times of not less than five years.

== Tax exemption ==
The products sold at the subsidiary canteens of the Central Police Canteen do not receive a special tax exemption as is provided for the same products available at the Canteen Stores Department. The lack of a tax exemption makes the products available at the CPC costlier in comparison to the CSD. Many organisations, including different CAPFs, different state police forces, and the Confederation of Ex-Paramilitary Forces Welfare Association have petitioned the Central Government from time to time to provide a Goods and Services Tax exemption for the products available at the CPC in line with the CSD. However, the Home Ministry refused to provide such rebate in October 2019 and decided to instead "compensate the CPCs through budgetary support to that extent".

== Indigenous products ==
Prime Minister Narendra Modi addressed the nation on 12 May 2020 to announce a special economic package among other measures taken by the government during the coronavirus pandemic. He underscored the importance of indigenous products and the local supply chain and appealed to the nation to "be vocal for [the country's] local products [and] not just buy but also publicise them". The day after the appeal of the Prime Minister, the Union Home Minister Amit Shah announced that Central Police Canteens throughout the country would only sell either Indian products or made in Indian products, and this order was supposed to go into effect beginning on 1 June 2020.

Proceeding with the direction of the Ministry of Home Affairs, the chief executive officer of the CPC, CRPF DIG R. M. Meena, issued a list of 1,026 items on 29 May which he found non-indigenous and which were required to be banned for sale in the CPC subsidiary canteens. The list created a controversy, as many products made by Indian companies and products manufactured in India by foreign companies appeared on it. The Ministry withdrew the order issued by Meena on 1 June, stating that he prepared and issued the list without receiving approval from the competent authority. The Kendriya Police Kalyan Bhandar issued an order on 2 June to recall the order issued on 29 May "with immediate effect", saying that it would "re-scrutinise the lists of products under different categories". Meena was removed from his post as CEO and repatriated to the CRPF on 3 June, and another CRPF DIG, Rajeev Ranjan Kumar, was appointed as his replacement.
