= Kulasekharapuram =

Coordinates: 8°09′N 77°30′E

- Census Town
- Nickname: K.S Puram
- Interactive map of Kulasekharapuram
- Country: India
- State: Kerala
- District: Kollam
- Taluk: Karunagappally

Government
  - Type: Panchayat Raj
  - Body: Kulasekharapuram Grama Panchayat

Area
  - Total: 9.5 km^{2} (3.7 sq mi)

Population (2011)
  - Total: 26,907
  - Density: 2,800/km^{2} (7,300/sq mi)

Languages
  - Official: Malayalam, English
- Time zone: UTC+5:30 (IST)
- Vehicle registration: KL-23
- Kollam: Karunagappally

Kulasekharapuram is a census town in Kollam district in the state of Kerala, India. It is part of Karunagappalli taluk and Karunagappally Assembly constituency. Places like Puthiyakavu, Vallickavu, Vavvakkavu, Puthentheruvu are some major places within Kulasekharapuram Village.

== Demographics- Census Data 2011 ==
Information	Figure	Remark
Population	26,907	
Males	12,691	
Females	14,216	
0-6 age group	2833	10.53% of population
Female sex ratio	1120	state av=1084
literacy rate	93.07%	state av=94.0
Male literacy	95.93%	
Female literacy	90.57%	
Hindu	71.79%	
Muslim	25.96%	
Christian	2.14%	
Scheduled Caste	6.03%	
scheduled tribe	0.19%	
