= Kodumon =

Kodumon Pathanamthitta
- village
- Location in Kerala, India Kodumon (India)
- Coordinates: 9°11′30″N 76°48′0″E
- Country: India
- State: Kerala
- District: Pathanamthitta

Population (2011)
  - Total: 15,542

Languages
  - Official: Malayalam, English
- Time zone: UTC+5:30 (IST)
- PIN: 691555
- Telephone code: 04734
- Vehicle registration: KL-26(Adoor sub RTO)
- Nearest city: Adoor
- Lok Sabha constituency: Pathanamthitta
- Legislative Assembly constituency: Adoor and Konni

Kodumon (pronounced ko-du-mann) is a village in Adoor Taluk of Pathanamthitta district in the state of Kerala, India.

== Demographics ==
As of 2011 India census, Kodumon had a population of 15542 with 7227 males and 8315 females.
