= Thazhava =

- Village
- Location in Kerala, India Thazhava (India)
- Coordinates: 9°5′0″N 76°32′0″E
- Country: India
- State: Kerala
- District: Kollam

Population (2011)
  - Total: 23,341

Languages
  - Official: Malayalam, English
- Time zone: UTC+5:30 (IST)
- PIN: 690523,690539
- Telephone code: 0476
- Vehicle registration: KL-23
- Nearest city: Kollam (33.5 km)

Thazhava is a village in Karunagappally taluk, Kollam district in the state of Kerala, India.

== Demographic-Census Data 2011 ==
Information	Figure	Remark
Population	23341	
Males	10818	
Females	12523	
0-6 age group	2339	10.02% of population
Female sex ratio	1158	state av=1084
literacy rate	93.80 %	state av=94.0
Male literacy	96.46%	
Female literacy	91.54 %	
Scheduled Caste	7.81%	
scheduled tribe	0.20%	

Here many seek a livelihood based on Thazha or screw pine. Screw pine weaving of mats is one of the oldest crafts popular in Thazhava. Even though now the weaving of screw pine mats have been comparatively reduced than the earlier times, there exists few traditional weavers who still continue this profession. Mats are now being exported within as well as outside India.

In the ancient times, screw pine mats were weaved and distributed in bulk to various provinces within Kerala including Travancore province.

== See also ==
- Pulimukham Devi Temple

Thazhava Sree krishna swamy Temple

== Transport ==
Main transport is provided by state-owned Kerala State Road Transport Corporation (KSRTC) and private transport bus operators.

Karunagappally railway station is the nearest railway station.

Trivandrum International Airport is the nearest airport.
