= Panayam =

- village
- Location in Kerala, India Panayam (India)
- Coordinates: 8°56′0″N 76°37′0″E
- Country: India
- State: Kerala
- District: Kollam

Population (2011)
  - Total: 25,607

Languages
  - Official: Malayalam, English
- Time zone: UTC+5:30 (IST)
- Postal code: 691312
- Vehicle registration: KL-
- Coastline: 0 kilometres (0 mi)
- Climate: Tropical monsoon (Köppen)
- Avg. summer temperature: 35 °C (95 °F)
- Avg. winter temperature: 20 °C (68 °F)

Panayam is a village in Kollam district in the state of Kerala, India.

== Demographics ==
As of 2011 India census, Panayam had a population of 25607 with 12267 males and 13340 females.
