= Thrikkaruva =

Thrikkaruva Thiruvudal karuvaya desham
- village
- Nickname: karuva
- Location in Kerala, India Thrikkaruva (India)
- Coordinates: 8.943792°N 76.603933°E
- Country: India
- State: Kerala
- District: Kollam

Population (2011)
  - Total: 25,432

Languages
  - Official: Malayalam, English
- Time zone: UTC+5:30 (IST)
- Vehicle registration: KL-

Thrikkaruva is a village in Kollam district in the state of Kerala, India.

== Demographics ==
As of 2011 India census, Thrikkaruva had a population of 25432 with 12087 males and 13345 females.
