= Kallelibhagom =

Kallelibhagom Mararithotam
- Census Town
- Location in Kerala, India Kallelibhagom (India)
- Coordinates: 9°3′0″N 76°33′0″E
- Country: India
- State: Kerala
- District: Kollam

Area
  - Total: 8.95 km^{2} (3.46 sq mi)

Population (2011)
  - Total: 21,723
  - Density: 2,430/km^{2} (6,290/sq mi)

Languages
  - Official: Malayalam, English
- Time zone: UTC+5:30 (IST)
- PIN: 690519
- Vehicle registration: KL-23
- Nearest city: Kollam
- Nearest town: Karunagapally

Kallelibhagom is a census town in Kollam district in the state of Kerala, India.

== Demographics- Census Data 2011 ==
Information	Figure	Remark
Population	21,723	
Number of households	5477	
Males	10,417	
Females	11,306	
0-6 age group	2232	10.27% of population
Female sex ratio	1085	state av=1084
literacy rate	93.46%	state av=94.0
Male literacy	95.95	
Female literacy	91.21%	
Hindu	70.04%	
Muslim	26.85%	
Christian	2.72%	
