= Puthiyakavu =

- town
- Country: India
- State: Kerala
- District: Thiruvananthapuram

Languages
  - Official: Malayalam, English
- Time zone: UTC+5:30 (IST)
- PIN: 695601
- Telephone code: 0470
- Vehicle registration: KL-01, KL-16
- Coastline: 0 kilometres (0 mi)
- Climate: Tropical monsoon (Köppen)
- Avg. summer temperature: 35 °C (95 °F)
- Avg. winter temperature: 20 °C (68 °F)

Puthiyakavu is located in Kilimanoor (Kilimanoor) city, in Kerala in southern India. The puthiyakavu devi temple, choottayil juma masjid kilimanoor GHSS, RRV GIRLS HSS, RRV BOYS VHSS, kilimanoor market, BSNL office and the head post office are located here.
