= Adinad =

Village in Kerala, India

Adinadu
- village
- Location in Kerala, India Adinadu (India)
- Coordinates: 9°4′0″N 76°30′0″E
- Country: India
- State: Kerala
- District: Kollam

Population (2011)
  - Total: 22,250

Languages
  - Official: Malayalam, English
- Time zone: UTC+5:30 (IST)
- Vehicle registration: KL-23

Adinadu is a village in Kollam district in the state of Kerala, India. Adinadu is included in the Kulasekharapuram panchayath.
