= Thazhuthala =

- village
- Location in Kerala, India Thazhuthala (India)
- Coordinates: 8°52′0″N 76°40′0″E
- Country: India
- State: Kerala
- District: Kollam

Government
  - Body: Grama panchayathu

Population (2011)
  - Total: 37,517

Languages
  - Official: Malayalam, English
- Time zone: UTC+5:30 (IST)
- Postal code: 691571
- Vehicle registration: KL-

Thazhuthala is a peaceful and serene village located two kilometres north of Kottiyam junction in Kollam district in the state of Kerala, India. The village is known by the Sree Maha Ganapathi temple and the famous 'Gajothsavam' equivalent to the Thrissur Pooram.
