= Meenad =

Meenad Chathannoor
- Village
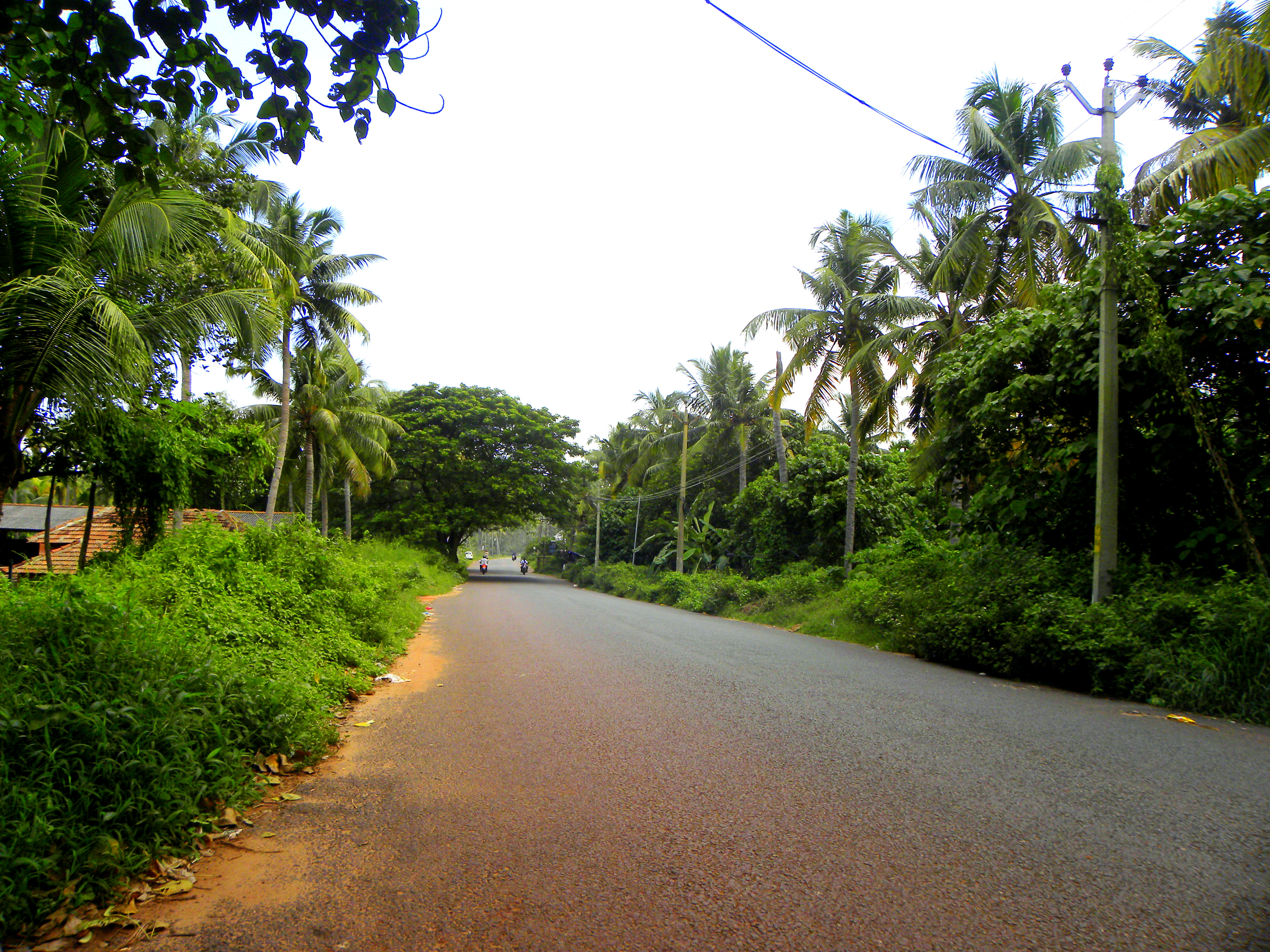
- Paravur-Chathannoor road at Meenad

- Location in Kerala, India Meenad (India)
- Coordinates: 8°51′0″N 76°41′45″E
- Country: India
- State: Kerala
- District: Kollam

Population (2011)
  - Total: 29,716

Languages
  - Official: Malayalam, English
- Time zone: UTC+5:30 (IST)
- Vehicle registration: KL-

Meenad is a village in Kollam district in the state of Kerala, India. It is just 6 km away from Paravur.

== Demographics ==
As of 2011 India census, Meenad had a population of 29,716 with 13,785 males and 15,931 females.

== Transport ==
Meenad is well connected with Paravur and Chathannoor. The well furnished Paravur-Chathannoor road is passing through Meenad. The proximity of this place to Paravur Railway Station and National Highway 47 makes Meenad a major residential area in the district.

Paravur Railway Station is an 'Adersh Railway Station', so a good number of important daily trains have halts here.
