= Kottamkara =

- Census Town
- Location in Kerala, India Kottamkara (India)
- Coordinates: 8°55′0″N 76°38′0″E
- Country: India
- State: Kerala
- District: Kollam
- Established: 1953

Government
  - Type: Panchayat Raj
  - Body: Kottamkara Grama Panchayat

Area
  - Total: 11.32 km^{2} (4.37 sq mi)

Population (2011)
  - Total: 44,402
  - Density: 3,922/km^{2} (10,160/sq mi)

Languages
  - Official: Malayalam, English
- Time zone: UTC+5:30 (IST)
- Vehicle registration: KL-

Kottamkara is a census town in Kollam district in the state of Kerala, India.

== Demographics ==
As of 2011 India census, Kottamkara had a population of 44402 with 21458 males and 22944 females.
