= Vadakkumthala =

- Village
- Location in Kerala, India Vadakkumthala (India)
- Coordinates: 9°1′0″N 76°33′0″E
- Country: India
- State: Kerala
- District: Kollam

Area
  - Total: 8.31 km^{2} (3.21 sq mi)

Population (2011)
  - Total: 20,993
  - Density: 2,530/km^{2} (6,540/sq mi)

Languages
  - Official: Malayalam, English
- Time zone: UTC+5:30 (IST)
- PIN: 690536
- Vehicle registration: KL-23
- Nearest city: kollam
- Nearest town: Karunagapally

Vadakkumthala is a village in Kollam district in the state of Kerala, India. Vadakkumthala is coming under the Kollam UA.

== Demographics – Census Data 2011 ==
Information	Figure	Remark
Population	20,993	
Number of households	5,084	
Males	10,002	
Females	10,991	
0–6 age group	2,326	11.08% of population
Female sex ratio	1.099	state av=1.084
literacy rate	93.66 %	state av=94.0
Male literacy	96.24%	
Female literacy	91.35 %	
Hindu	47.10%	
Muslim	45.10%	
Christian	7.61%	
Scheduled caste	12.62%	
scheduled tribe	0.34%	
