= Ayanivelikulangara =

- village
- Location in Kerala, India Ayanivelikulangara (India)
- Coordinates: 9.043615°N 76.519918°E
- Country: India
- State: Kerala
- District: Kollam

Government
  - Body: Karunagapally municipality

Population (2011)
  - Total: 24,268

Languages
  - Official: Malayalam, English
- Time zone: UTC+5:30 (IST)
- Vehicle registration: KL-

Ayanivelikulangara is a village in Karunagapally municipality of Kollam district in the state of Kerala, India.

== Demographics- Census 2011 ==
Information	Figure	Remark
Population	24268	
Males	11664	
Females	12604	
0-6 age group	2517	10.37% of population
Female sex ratio	1081	state av=1084
literacy rate	93.83 %	state av=94.0
Male literacy	93.1	
Female literacy	91.76 %	
Hindu	68.12%	
Muslim	25.63%	
Christian	6.12%	
Scheduled Caste	9.63%	
scheduled tribe	0.09%	
