= Thodiyoor =

- Village
- Interactive map of Thodiyoor
- Country: India
- State: Kerala
- District: Kollam

Population (2011)
  - Total: 25,884

Languages
  - Official: Malayalam, English
- Time zone: UTC+5:30 (IST)
- PIN: 690523
- Telephone code: 0476
- Vehicle registration: KL-23
- Nearest city: Karunagappally
- Lok Sabha constituency: Alappuzha Lok Sabha constituency
- Vidhan Sabha constituency: Karunagapally

Thodiyoor is a village in Kollam district in the state of Kerala, India.

== Demographics- Census 2011 Data ==
Information	Figure	Remark
Population	25884	
Males	12333	
Females	13551	
0-6 age group	2872 11.10% of population	
Female sex ratio	1099	state av=1084
literacy rate	92.80 %	state av=94.0
Male literacy	95.49%	
Female literacy	90.39 %	
Hindu	55.01%	
Muslim	42.25%	
Christian	2.55%	
Scheduled Caste	9.47%	
Scheduled tribe	0.14%	

As of 2011 India census, Thodiyoor had a population of 25884 with 12333 males and 13,551 females. The famous temple Malumel Sree Bhagavathi is located in this village.
