= Panmana =

- village
- Location in Kerala, India Panmana (India)
- Coordinates: 9°0′28.174″N 76°32′28.27″E
- Country: India
- State: Kerala
- District: Kollam

Population (2011)
  - Total: 29,008

Languages
  - Official: Malayalam, English
- Time zone: UTC+5:30 (IST)
- Postal code: 691583
- Vehicle registration: KL 23
- Nearest city: Kollam City (19 km)
- Climate: Tropical monsoon (Köppen)
- Avg. summer temperature: 35 °C (95 °F)
- Avg. winter temperature: 20 °C (68 °F)

Panmana is a village in Kollam district in the state of Kerala, India.

== Demographics ==
As of the 2011 Indian census, Panmana had a population of 29,008.

== See also ==
- St. Andrew's Church, Kovilthottam
