= Thrikkovilvattom =

- village
- Location in Kerala, India Thrikkovilvattom (India)
- Coordinates: 8°54′0″N 76°39′0″E
- Country: India
- State: Kerala
- District: Kollam

Government
  - Type: panchayat

Area
  - Total: 18.66 km^{2} (7.20 sq mi)

Population (2011)
  - Total: 41,609
  - Density: 2,230/km^{2} (5,775/sq mi)

Languages
  - Official: Malayalam, English
- Time zone: UTC+5:30 (IST)
- Vehicle registration: KL-

Thrikkovilvattom is a panchayat in Kollam district in the state of Kerala, India. It is situated 9 km (5.6 mi) east of Kollam.

== Demographics ==
As of the 2011 Indian census, Thrikkovilvattom had a population of 41,609 with 20,012 males and 21,597 females.

== Places of interest ==
Murari Temple is a famous place of worship here. The last uthsavam (or festival) of the Malayalam year in all of Kerala takes place here.
