= Nedumpana =

- Grama Panchayath
- Location in Kerala, India Nedumpana (India)
- Coordinates: 8°54′50″N 76°41′20″E
- Country: India
- State: Kerala
- District: Kollam
- Established: 1953

Area
  - Total: 28.06 km^{2} (10.83 sq mi)

Population (2011)
  - Total: 29,454 (Male - 14,106 Female - 15,348)
  - Density: 1,831/km^{2} (4,740/sq mi)

Languages
  - Official: Malayalam, English
- Time zone: UTC+5:30 (IST)
- PIN: 691576
- Vehicle registration: KL-02
- Website: nedumpanagp.blogspot.in

Nedumpana is a grama panchayath in Kollam district in the state of Kerala, India. It is a part of Mukhathala Block Panchayath.

== Demographics ==
As of 2011 India census, Nedumpana had a population of 29454 with 14106 males and 15348 females.

== Geography ==
Nedumpana is a countryside in Kollam district featuring a typical kerala village consisting of paddy fields, wetlands, river channels and highlands. The area can be categorised into Ida Nadu (Mid land or plains) with an average elevation of 108 meter above mean sea level. Laterite soil and Alluvial Soil constitutes the major soil types. Major rainy season is the South West Monsoon, which bring about 130 cm of rain. Out of the total area, 6276 acres of land is culturable.

== Civic administration ==
Nedumpana panchayat is ruled by left democratic front since the formation of panchayat. Panchayat received Swaraj Trophy for the best panchayat in the State for many times. Apparel park started by Gramapanchayath along with Kudumbasree mission was a huge success and is still providing livelihood opportunities for women in the area.
