= Karunagappalli =

Municipality in Kerala, India

Karunagappally
- Municipality
- Location in Kerala, India Karunagappally (India)
- Coordinates: 9°3′16″N 76°32′7″E
- Country: India
- State: Kerala
- District: Kollam

Government
  - Type: Municipality
  - Chairman: Kottayil Raju
  - Vice Chairman: Sakeena Salam

Area
  - Total: 18.65 km^{2} (7.20 sq mi)
- Elevation: 14 m (46 ft)

Population (2011)
  - Total: 49,604
  - Density: 2,660/km^{2} (6,889/sq mi)
- Demonym: Karunagapallikkaran

Languages
  - Official: Malayalam, English
- Time zone: UTC+5:30 (IST)
- PIN: 690518
- Telephone code: +91 (0)4762
- ISO 3166 code: IN-KL
- Vehicle registration: KL-23
- Nearest city: Kollam (24 km)
- Sex ratio: 999 ♂/♀
- Literacy: 94.26%
- Civic agency: Karunagappally Municipality
- Climate: Am/Aw (Köppen)
- Avg. annual temperature: 27.2 °C (81.0 °F)
- Avg. summer temperature: 35 °C (95 °F)
- Avg. winter temperature: 24.4 °C (75.9 °F)

Karunagappally is a municipality in the Kollam district of Kerala, India. It is 24 km north of Kollam and 60 km (37 mi) south of Alappuzha. Karunagappally taluk consists of Alappad, Ochira, Adinad, Karunagappally, Thazhava, Pavumba, Thodiyoor, Kallalibhagom, Thevalakkara, Chavara, Neendakara, Clappana, Kulasekharapuram, Thekkumbhagam, Ayanivelikulangara, Panmana, Ponmana and Vadakumthala. The taluk is bound on the north by Kayamkulam, on the east by Kunnathur taluk, on the south by Kollam and on the west by the Arabian Sea. It is one of the fastest developing towns in Kerala and is part of Kollam metropolitan area.

Karunagappally is the location of a government engineering college named the College of Engineering Karunagappally, also known as CEK, and a Government Arts & Science College under the University of Kerala. Europeans called Karunagappally Martha. It is also home to renowned Amrita Vishwa Vidyapeetham University's campus.

== Tourist attractions ==
- Azheekal Beach– A coastal beach located about 10 km from Karunagappally town. Known for its scenery, clean sands, and sunset views.
- Alumkadavu Backwaters and Houseboat Facility – The village of Alumkadavu (3 km from Karunagappally) offers backwater views and houseboat services.
- Oachira Temple – Dedicated to Parabrahmam, this temple is a pilgrimage site and known for the Oachirakkali festival (June–July) and the Panthranduvilakku Utsavam in November–December. The temple is about 8 km away from Karunagappally and falls under the Karunagappally Taluk (sub-district)
- Vallickavu / Amritapuri Ashram – Located within Karunagappally Taluk, this spiritual campus (Amrita Vishwa Vidyapeetham's presence) draws many visitors.
- Kannetty(Pallickal) River Boat Race – Sree Narayana Trophy – An annual boat race held in the Pallickal / Kannetty river during Onam festival season.

== Demographics ==
As of 2011 India census, Karunagappalli Municipality had a population of 25,336 where 12,219 are males and 13,117 are females. 75% of the population is Hindu; Muslims, the second-largest community having 19%. Christians are scattered and spread over Panchayths and Municipality limits, and account for 6% of the population. In the coastal panchaythat Azheekal, almost 100% of the population is Hindu. The high literacy of Kerala is reflected in Karunagappalli as well with 94.23% of the population classified as literate as against the national average of 74.04%.

== Economy ==
Karungappalli used to be an agrarian economy until the late 19th century with coconut, banana, tapioca and paddy as the main crops grown. With rapid urbanization and the consequent pressure on land, the reliance on agriculture has dwindled. Several cottage and small industries have now come up in the area including brick making, engineering and electronics. Proximity to Kollam (27 km) and the excellent road and rail infrastructure have helped in this transition.

Fishing is the major source of livelihood for the coast dwellers. Foreign remittances from gulf countries are also an important source of income. Many prominent business centers in Kerala have started opening their branches here.

== Environment ==
Karunagappalli is known for high background radiation from thorium-containing monazite sand. In some coastal panchayats, median outdoor radiation levels are more than 4 mGy/yr and, in certain locations on the coast, it is as high as 70 mGy/yr.

== Transport ==
=== Road ===
Karunagappally is on the Kanyakumari-Kochi-Panvel National Highway 66 route. In taluk, Oachira to Neendakara is accessible through this same highway.

Main road transport is provided by State owned Kerala State Road Transport Corporation (KSRTC) and private transport bus operators. KSRTC Bus Station is situated in the heart of the town, on the National Highway 66. Buses are available from Karunagappally to Kollam, Thiruvananthapuram, Alappuzha, Ernakulam, Thrissur, Kottayam, Kayamkulam, Shasthamkotta, Harippad, Kottarakkara, Kodungallur, Guruvayur, etc. Local services are also available to destinations throughout the district. The station operates Super Fast, Fast Passenger, Non AC low-floor, Venad and Ordinary buses.

Road transport is also supported by private taxis and autorickshaws, also called as autos.

=== Rail ===
Karunagappalli railway station, (KPY) is a NSG 4 category railway station situated in Edakkulangara. It lies on the Kollam-Kayamkulam rail route of the Thiruvananthapuram-Ernakulam railway line and is only 1.5 km far from the KSRTC bus station. Auto rickshaws are available from and to the railway station. Buses are available to railway station bus stop every 15 minutes (150 meters from station). Also buses are available from town to Alumoodu Jn. bus stop every 5 minutes, which is only 700 meters away from KPY railway station. There are 32 express and 18 passenger trains are available from here.

Mumbai (Lokamanyathilak)-Thiruvananthapuram-Lokamanyathilak Netravati Express, Kanyakumari-Bangalore-Kanyakumari Island Express, TVC-Hydrabad-TVC Sabari Express, Kanyakumari-Mumbai-Kanyakumari Jayanthy Janatha Express, Nagarcoil-mangalur-Nagarcoil Ernad Express, TVC-Mangalur-TVC Maveli Express, TVC-Ernakulam-TVC Vanchinad Express, Nagarcoil-mangalur-Nagarcoil Parasuram Express, TVC-Shornur-TVC Venad Express, TVC-Mangalur-TVC Malabar Express, TVC-palakkad-TVC Amritha Express, Rajya Rani Express, Thiruvananthapuram-Guruvayoor-TVC Intercity Express, Kollam - Visakhapatnam Express, Trivandrum-Mangalapuram-Trivandrum Express and Punalur Palakkad Palaruvi Express are the main train connections. Around 50 trains have stop here in both directions. Station Code: KPY.

=== Air ===
Trivandrum International Airport is the nearest airport and is accessible via the National Highway 66.

== Politics ==
Karunagapalli assembly constituency is part of Alappuzha Lok Sabha constituency and the major political parties in Karunagappally municipality and nearby panchayaths were CPI[M], CPI, Congress, BJP.

Including Neendakara, Thevalakkara, Chavara and Panmana Panchayaths, Chavara assembly constituency is part of Quilon Lok Sabha constituency. CPI(M), RSP, CPI, BSP, BJP, are major political parties there.

== Industries ==
The major industries in the public sector are Indian Rare Earths Limited (IRE) and Kerala Minerals and Metals Limited (KMML) in Shankaramangalam. KERAFED in Puthiyakavu, house-boat manufacturing in Alumkadavu, the state owned Kerala Feeds Ltd in Kallelibhagom are also major industries.

The cashew nut industry plays a role in the local economy. Western India cashews in Puthiyakavu and Latha cashews processing, imports and exports in Charamurimuk are the major cashew processing units in town limits. Coconut, paddy, tapioca and banana are the other main agricultural crops. Other small scale and cottage industries are based on bricks, well rings making, engineering, electronics items and handicrafts.
