= List of hospitals in Kollam =

Kollam or Quilon is one of the oldest port cities in India. It is also an ancient civilization in the country. Kollam city is home to a population of more than 3.5 Lakh (350,000) people. The city has population density of 6199/km^{2}, which is the second highest in Kerala next to Kollam Metropolitan Area with a total population of 11.10 Lakh.

Kollam's healthcare sector is considered one of the most developed in the state of Kerala. There were hospitals giving free Modern medical treatment (Dharmasupathris) in Quilon since ME 995. The Metropolitan Area of Kollam has 3 Medical Colleges and a good number of multi-speciality and super-speciality hospitals. At present, the healthcare industry is witnessing stiff competition among these hospitals.

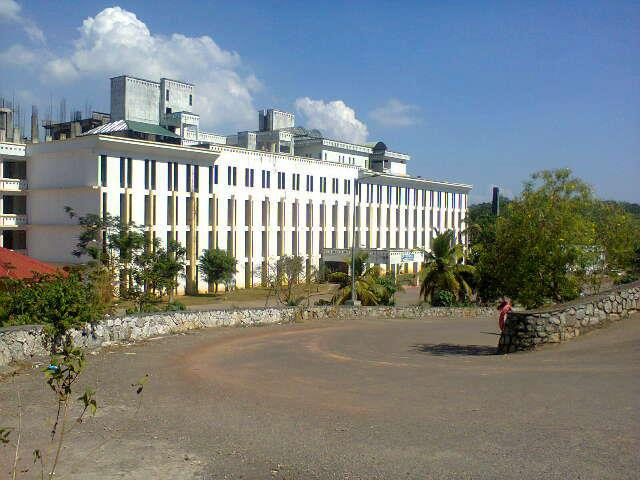
Azeezia Medical College & Hospital, Meeyannoor

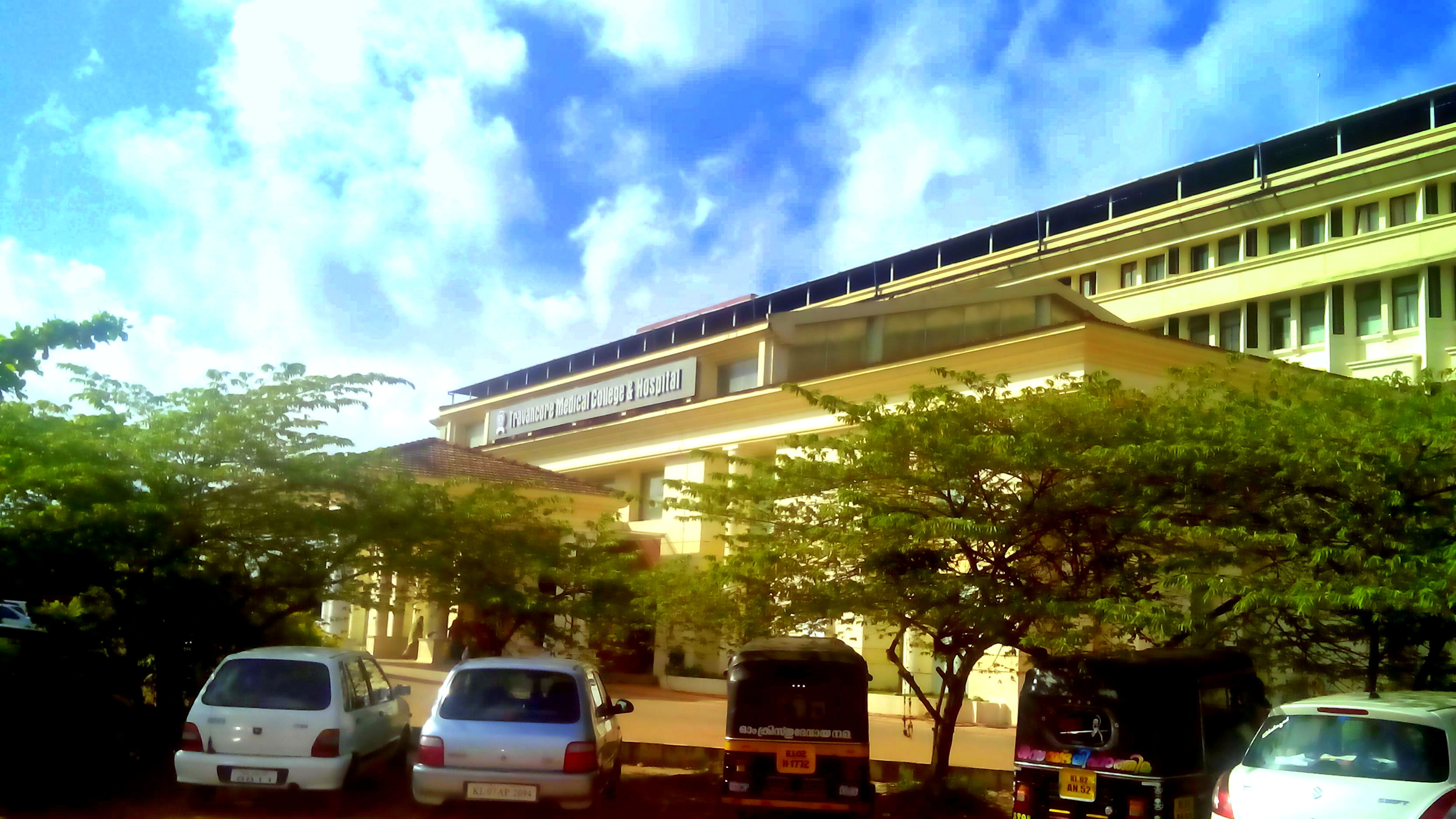
Travancore Medicity Medical College Hospital, Palathara

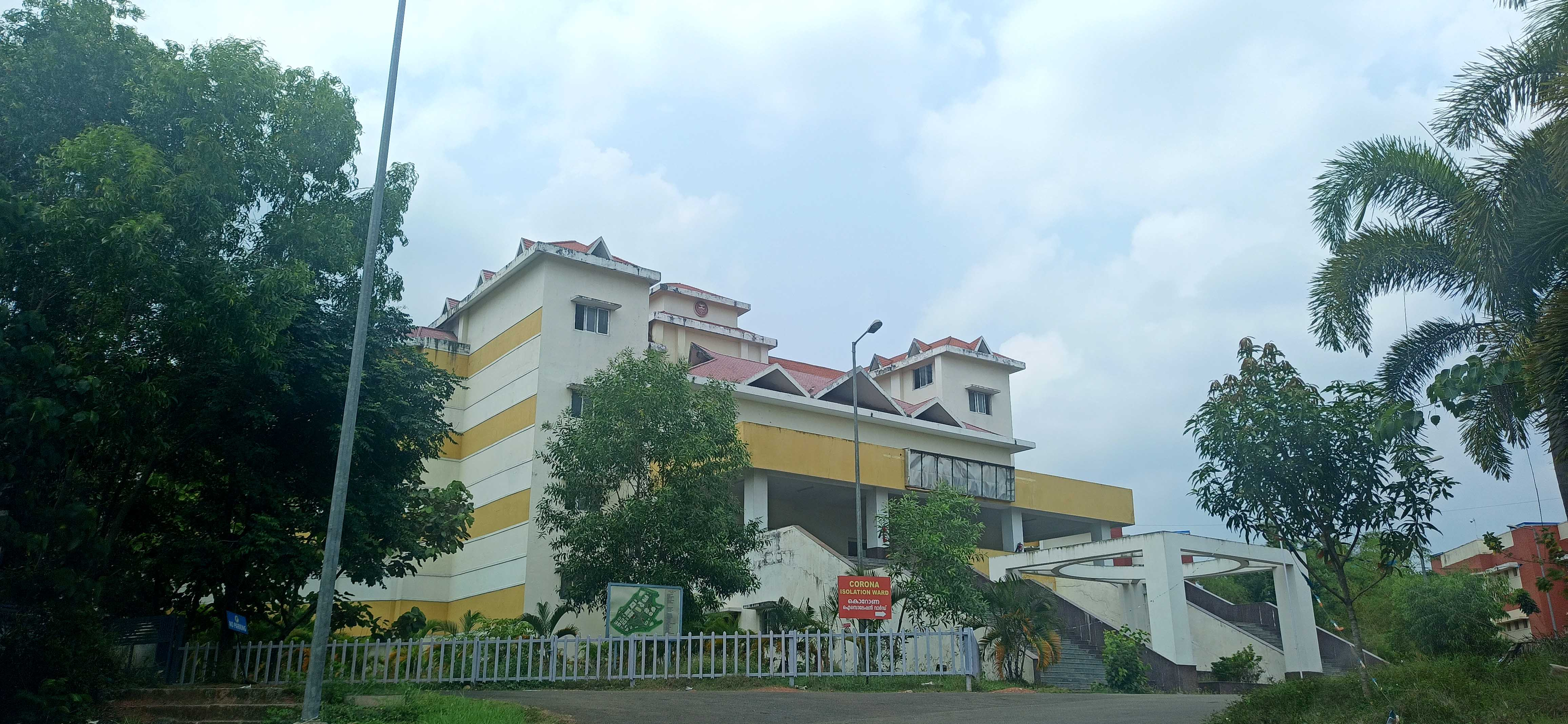
Government Medical College, Kollam

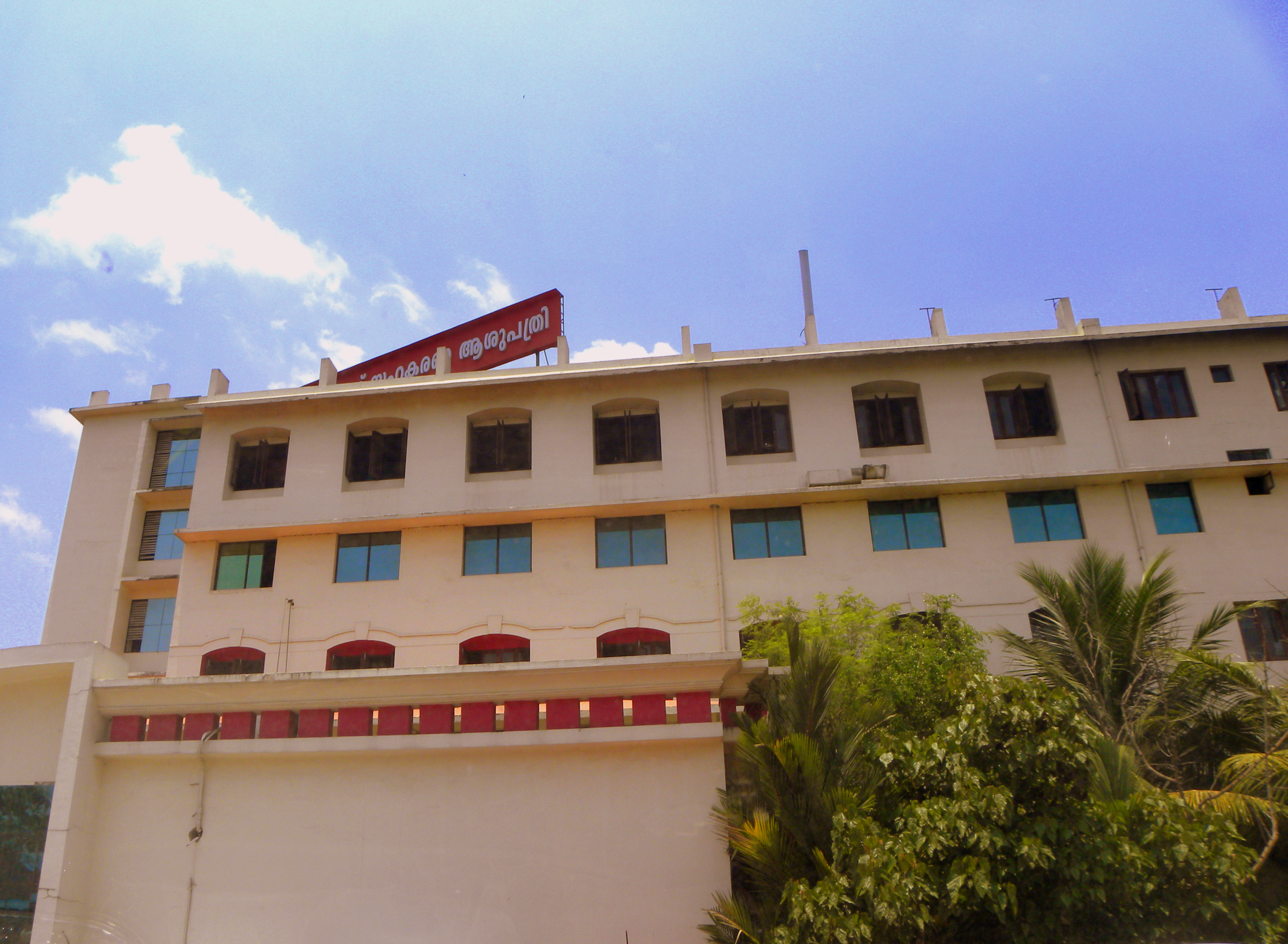
N. S. Memorial Institute of Medical Sciences, Palathara

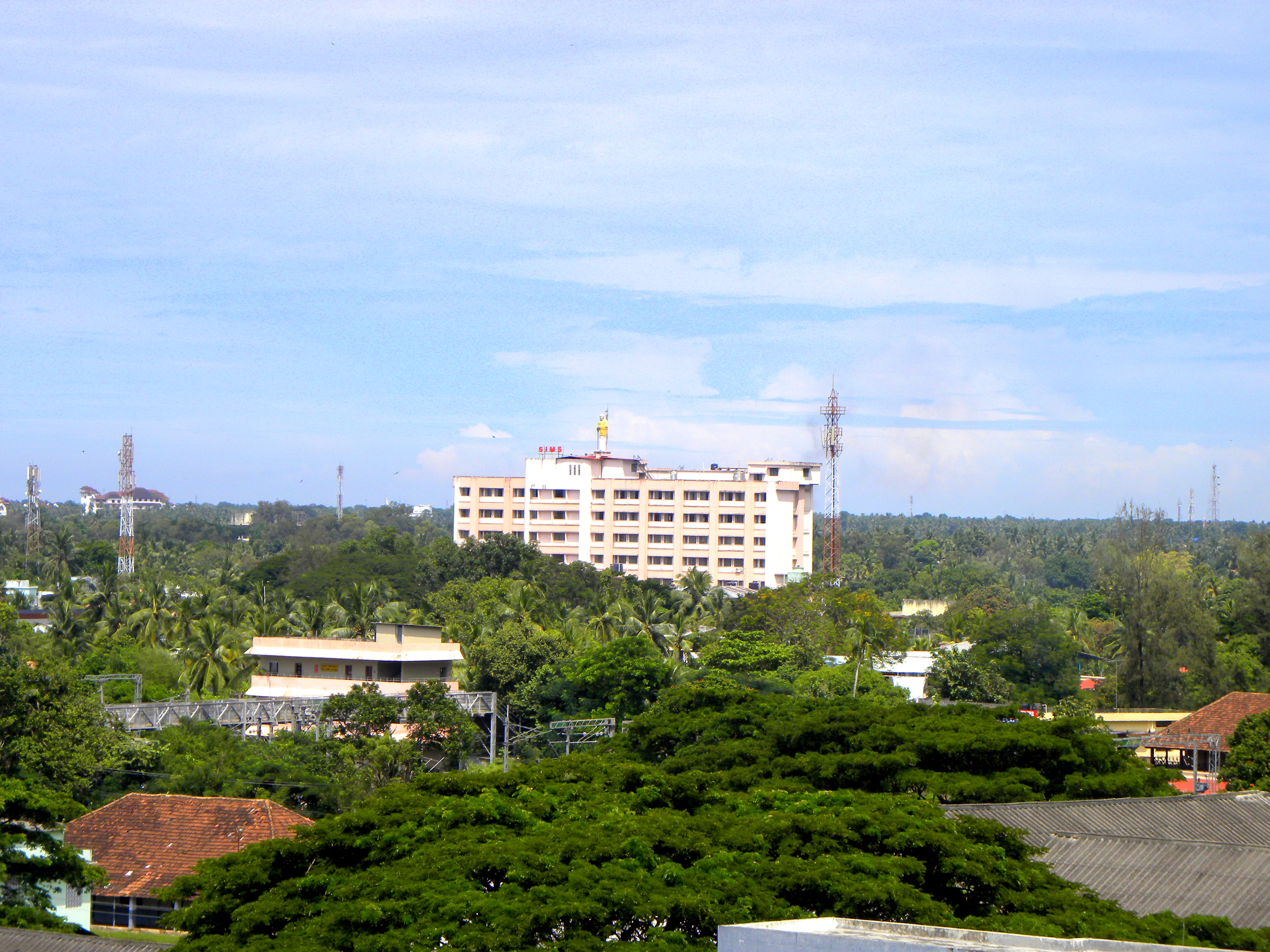
Aerial view of Sankar's Institute of Medical Sciences(SIMS) in Asramam, Kollam

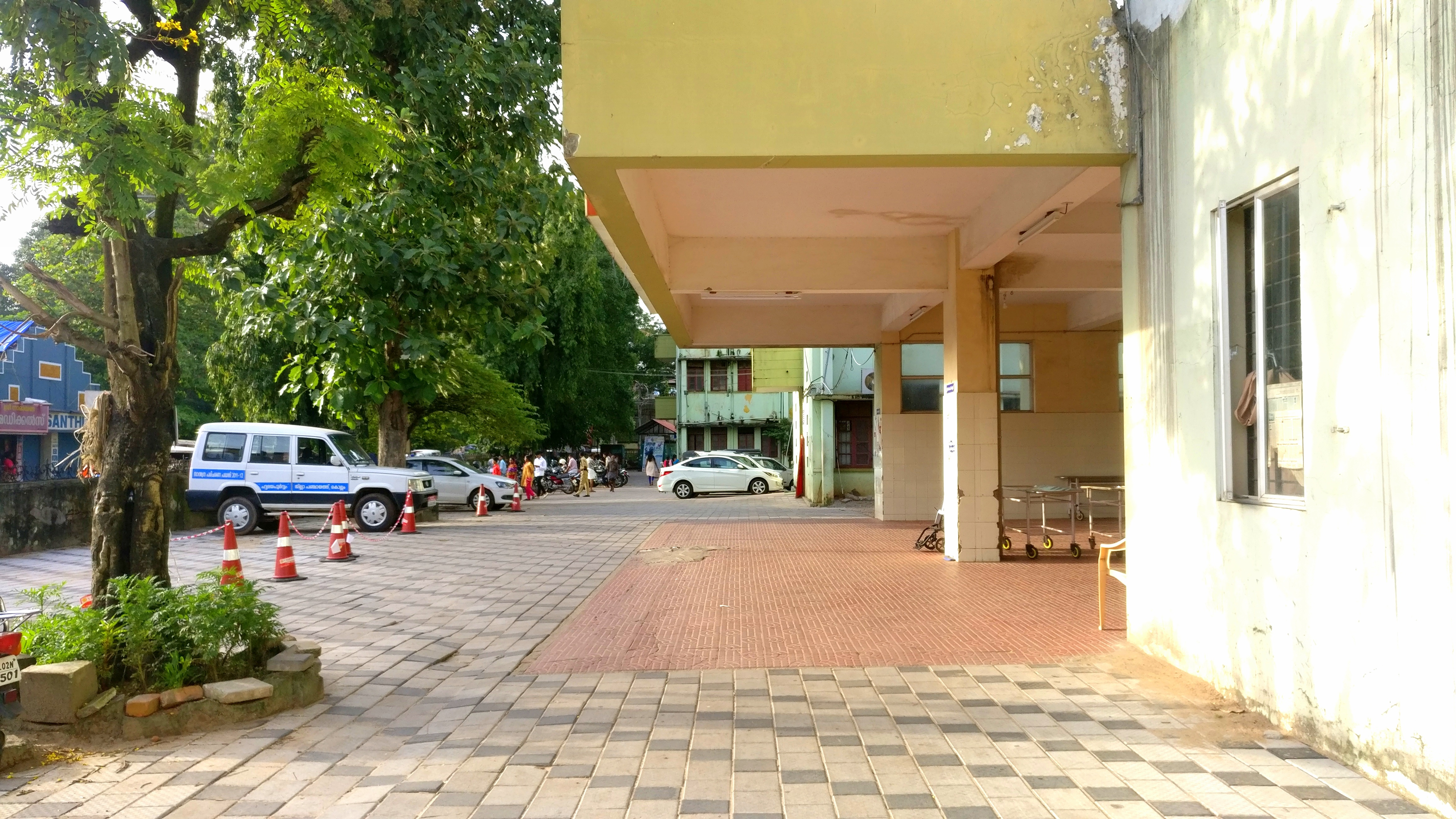
Entrance of Government District Hospital in Cutchery, Kollam

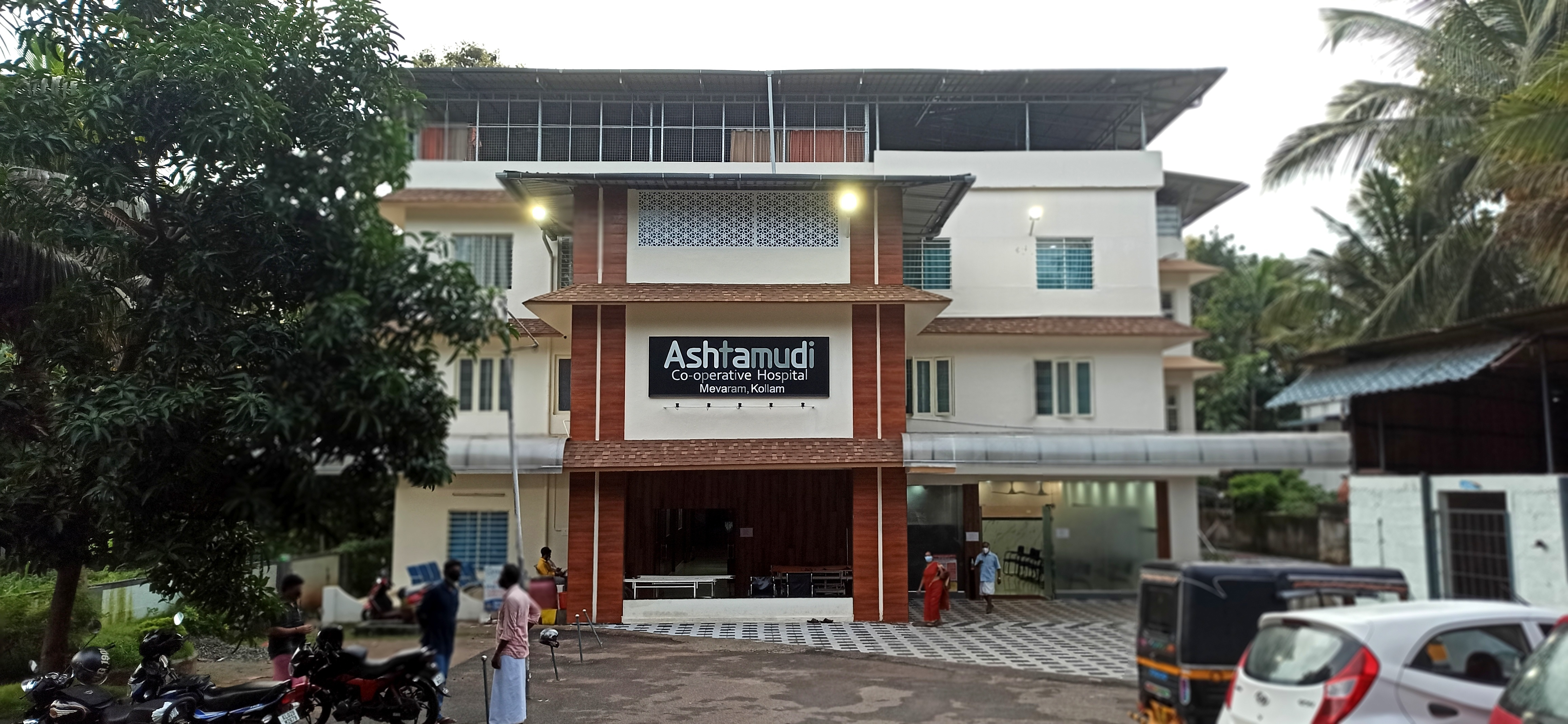
Ashtamudi Hospital, Mevaram

== Medical College Hospitals ==
- Government Medical College Hospital, Kollam
- Azeezia Medical College Hospital, Meeyannoor
- Travancore Medical College Hospital, Mevaram

== Multi-specialty/Super-specialty Hospitals ==
- KIMSHEALTH Hospital, Kottiyam -Kollam
- Meditrina Hospital, Ayathil
- N. S. Memorial Institute of Medical Sciences, Palathara
- ESIC Model & Super Speciality Hospital, Asramam
- ESIC Hospital, Ezhukone
- Padmavathy Medical Foundation, Sasthamkotta
- Holy Cross Super Speciality Hospital, Kottiyam
- Dr. Nairs Hospital, Asramam
- Shankar's Institute Of Medical Science (SIMS), Kadappakada
- Upasana Hospital, Chinnakada
- Bishop Benziger Hospital, Beach Road
- Ashtamudi Hospital & Trauma Care Centre, Mevaram
- Kerala Institute of Medical Sciences (KIMS), Kottiyam
- Valiyath Institute of Medical Sciences, Karunagappally
- Parabrahma Hospital and Research Centre, Oachira
- EMS Co-Operative Hospital, Pathanapuram
- Sree Sathya Sai Super Speciality Hospital, Kottarakkara
- Vijaya Hospital, Kottarakkara
- Poyanil Hospital, Punalur
- Matha Medical Centre, Kadavoor, Kollam

- BR Hospital & Research Centre, Nedungolam

== Other Government Hospitals ==
- Government District Hospital, Downtown
- Government Victoria Hospital (for Women & Children), Downtown
- District TB Centre, Chinnakada
- Government Taluk Hospital, Neendakara
- Government TB Centre, Karunagappally
- Government Taluk Headquarters Hospital, Karunagappally
- Government Taluk Hospital, Kadakkal
- Ramarao Memorial Government Taluk Hospital, Nedungolam, Paravur
- Government Taluk Hospital, Kundara
- Government Taluk Headquarters Hospital, Kottarakkara
- Govt Taluk Headquarters Hospital, Punalur
- Government Taluk Headquarters Hospital, Sasthamkotta

== Private Hospitals ==
- Kumar Hospital, High School Jn.
- P.N.N Memorial Hospital, Anchalumoodu
- C. Achutha Menon Co-Operative Hospital, Palathara
- Kerala ENT Research Foundation, Thevally
- Amardeep Eye Hospital, Kilikollur
- Mar Theodosius Memorial Medical Mission Hospital, Sasthamcotta
- K. Damodaran Memorial Hospital, Chinnakada
- PMR Hospital, Valathungal
- Prathiba Hospital, Tangasseri
- Christ Church Hospital, Pallithottam
- Chaithanya Eye Hospital, Pallimukku
- C.Achutha Menon Co-operative Hospital, Decent Jn.
- Devans Hospital, Keralapuram
- SSR Hospital, Keralapuram
- London Missionary Society Boys' Brigade Hospital (LMS), Kundara
- Assisi Atonement Hospital, Kottamkara
- Lekshmi Trust Hospital, Kundara
- Star Hospital, Oachira
- Pranavam Hospital, Punalur
- St Thomas Hospital, Punalur
- A.M Hospital, Karunagappally
- Pearl Hospital, Karunagappally
- S.B.M Hospital, Karunagappally
- Ideal Clinic, Karunagappally
- Royal Hospital, Chathannoor
- MKM Hospital, Kuttivattom
- Paravur Hospital, Paravur
- Captain Mathews Hospital, Mulavana
- Christhuraj Hospital, Kottarakara
- Lotus Heart Hospital, Kottarakara
- MGM Hospital, Puthoor
- Yogakshema Hospital, Veliyam
- Thettikkuzhy Hospital, Kunnikodu
- St Joseph Hospital, Anchal
- Shanker's Eye Hospital, Kadakkal
- Kadakkal Institute of Medical Sciences & Technology Hospital, Kadakkal
- Arafa Medical Mission Hospital, Kadakkal
- SM Hospital, Kadakkal
- PVS Hospital, Kadakkal
- Dr K Damodaran Memorial Hospital, Kollam
- The Lifeline Fertility and Well Woman Centre, Prathibha Jn, Kadappakkada
