= Thattamala =

- Neighbourhood
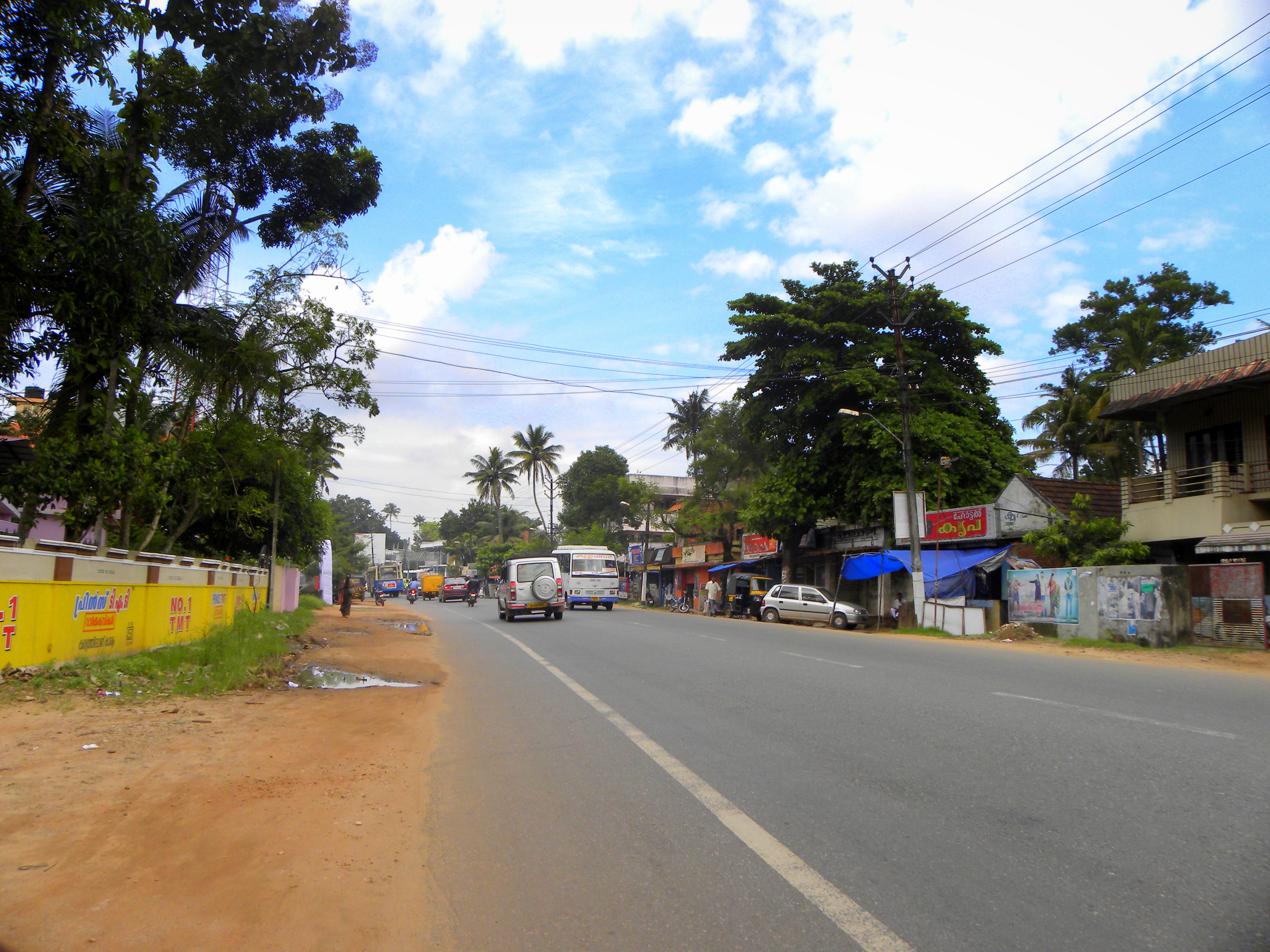
- National Highway-66 at Thattamala

- Location in Kollam, India Thattamala (Kerala) Thattamala (India)
- Coordinates: 8.871725°N 76.639020°E
- Country: India
- City: Kollam
- Zone: Eravipuram

Government
  - Body: Kollam Municipal Corporation(KMC)

Languages
  - Official: Malayalam, English
- Time zone: UTC+5:30 (IST)
- PIN: 691020
- Vehicle registration: KL-02
- Lok Sabha constituency: Kollam
- Civic agency: Kollam Municipal Corporation
- Avg. summer temperature: 34 °C (93 °F)
- Avg. winter temperature: 22 °C (72 °F)
- Website: http://www.kollam.nic.in

Thattamala is a neighbourhood situated at the southeast border of Kollam city in state of Kerala, India. It is situated at National Highways – NH 66 (Earlier NH 47). Kerala Police have identified Thattamala as one of the traffic black spots in the state.

Thattamala was a part of old Vadakkevila panchayath before the constitution of Kollam as a city. In 2000, Kollam was upgraded by the Government of Kerala as the 4th Municipal Corporation of Kerala by merging Vadakkevila, Kilikollur, Sakthikulangara and Eravipuram panchayaths with Kollam Municipality.

== Major Public/Private Institutions near Thattamala ==
- Thattamala Post Office
- BSNL Telephone Exchange
- United Electrical Industries Limited...

Schools & Colleges

- Government Vocational Higher secondary school, Thattamala
- Sree Narayana Public School
- VVVHSS Ayathil
- Devi Vilasam Lower Primary School
- Grace International School
- AKM Higher Secondary School
- Mannam Memorial Residential Public School
- The Oxford School, Kollam
- Vimala Hridaya ISC School
- Sree Narayana Institute of Technology
- Younus College Of Engineering & Technology
- N.S. Memorial College Of Nursing
- Travancore Nursing College
- Travancore Nursing College
- Fathima Memorial Training College
- Bemax Academy
- Edugarnet Academy
- Maria Day Care Center
- SN Kids World
- Creative Indian School
- Little Hearts School
- Sanfort Kids Palathara...

Clinical Laboratory & Hospitals

- Government Community Health Centre Palathara
- Government Homoeo Dispensary - Kootikada
- Government Ayurveda dispensary - Pallimukku
- Travancore Medicity Medical College Hospital
- NS Cooperative Hospital
- Ashtamudi Hospital
- NS Ayurveda hospital
- OUSHADHI - Ayurveda Shop
- Jaya Clinical Laboratory
- Kamala Clinic- Super speciality ENT center and Pediatric kidney clinic
- SRM Hospital
- AIMS Diagnostic Centre
- RMG Clinic
- Hayat Clinic
- Devi Clinical Laboratory
- Dr Sruthy's Dental Lounge
- D care Dental Clinic
- Shifa Dental Clinic
- SPM Homoeopathy
- Thottathil Medicals
- Adithya Medicals
- Alchemy Healthcare
- Neethi Medical Store
- Akshaya Medical shop...

Bank, ATM & Financiers

- Canara Bank Thattamala branch
- South Indian Bank Branch
- Vadakkevila service co-operative bank
- Kerala Bank Branch
- Kollam District Co-operative Bank - Branch
- Canara Bank - ATM
- SBI ATM
- Federal Bank ATM - Inside Medicity
- Axis Bank ATM - Inside Medicity
- Muthoot FinCorp Gold Loan
- Muthoottu Mini Financiers
- Manappuram Finance Limited
- Thayyil Financiers...

Automotive Shops

- Anantheswara Motors
- NEXA (Sarathy Autocars, Kollam, Pallimukku)
- NCS KIA KOLLAM
- KTM Kollam
- MG ESN Kollam
- Sarathy Bajaj
- Hercules Maruthi
- Popular Megamotors
- Tata Motors passenger and commercial vehicles
- Tata Motors Cars Showroom - Muthoot Automotive, Kollam Bypass
- Denz Motors Ape Piaggio
- Mahindra First Choice
- Maruti Suzuki TRUE VALUE (Sarathy Autocars)
- Jawa kollam
- Vahini Honda
- Aprilia Vespa
- Volkswagen Kollam...

Auditoriums / Halls

- Lalas Convention Centre
- Preethi Auditorium
- Govt Community Hall Vadakkevila
- La-thansa Auditorium
- Rajadhani Auditorium
- Grand Auditorium
- Royal Auditorium
- Brothers Auditorium...

Daily needs shops

- Thattamala Market
- Supplyco Supermarket
- Ration Shops
- Thumpattu Store
- Raj agency
- Fresh Cart Supermarket
- Lakshmi Bakery
- Apple bakery
- Chothy Bakery
- FRUITBAE
- Smoothie Juice Corner and Bakera
- St Jude Gas Service
- Pulimoottil Stores - Beauty Centre
- Rahul Beauty Centre
- Farm Store...

Shops

- Royaloak Furniture Kollam
- Dimos Furniture
- Damro Furniture
- BAS Furniture
- Madathil jewellery
- Mangalya Jewellery
- Mahindra pumps...

Health & wellness

- KS Multi Gymnasium
- Las Vegas fitness centre
- SNPS swimming pool
- Maithanam Football Turf
- Soccerz Football Turf...

== See also ==
- Kollam
- Mevaram
- Kollam Junction railway station
- Kollam Bypass
