= Ayathil =

- Neighbourhood
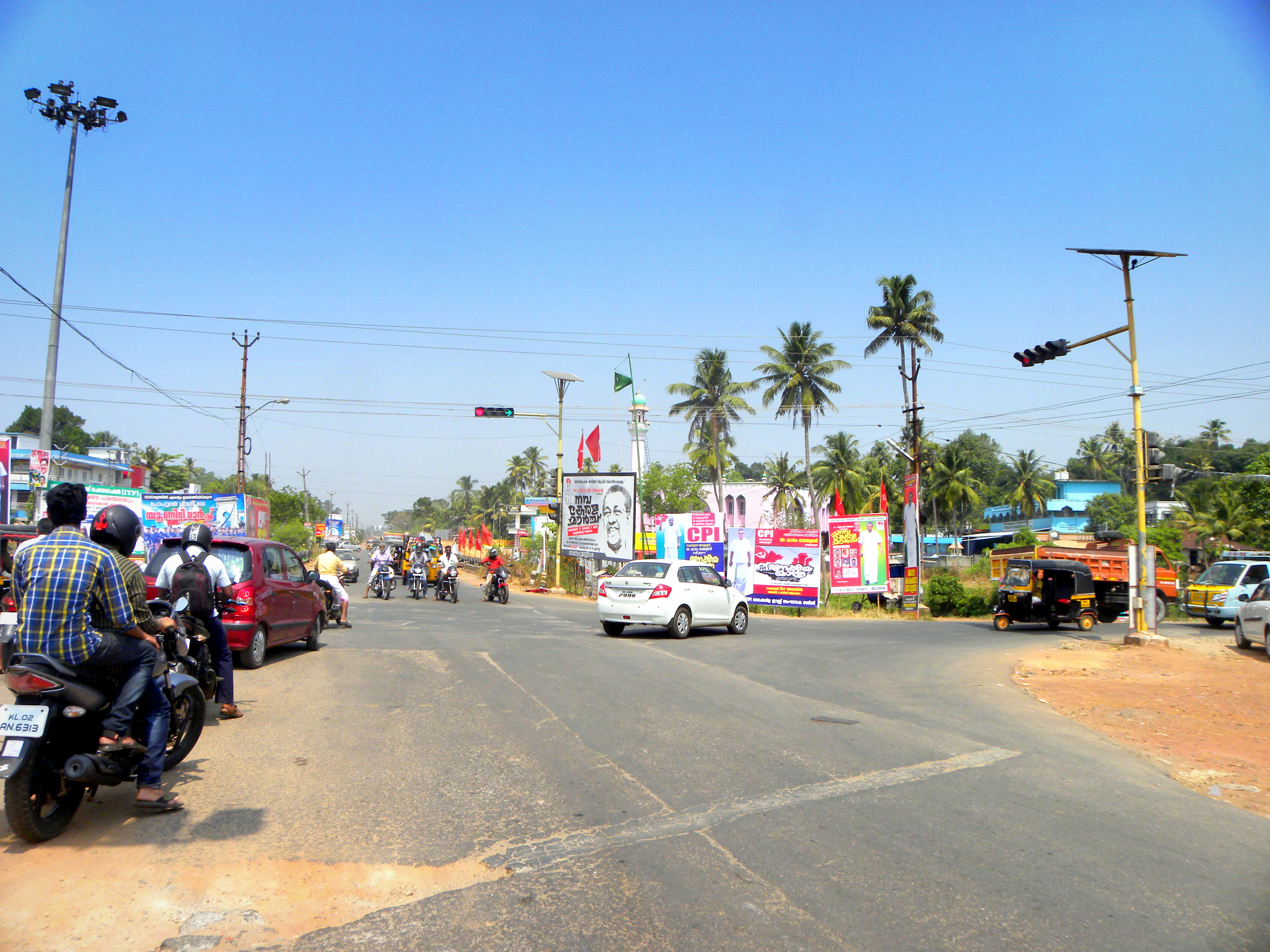
- Kollam Bypass at Ayathil

- Location within Kerala
- Coordinates: 8.892101°N 76.630069°E
- Country: India
- State: Kerala
- City: Kollam

Government
  - Body: Kollam Municipal Corporation(KMC)

Languages
  - Official: Malayalam, English
- Time zone: UTC+5:30 (IST)
- PIN: 691021
- Vehicle registration: KL-02
- Lok Sabha constituency: Kollam
- Civic agency: Kollam Municipal Corporation
- Avg. summer temperature: 34 °C (93 °F)
- Avg. winter temperature: 22 °C (72 °F)
- Website: http://www.kollam.nic.in

Ayathil is a neighbourhood in Vadakkevila zone of Kollam city, Kerala, India. It is the 36th ward in Kollam Municipal Corporation. It is one of the cashew processing hubs in Kollam city. Kerala State Cashew Development Corporation Limited has a factory there. Kollam Bypass passes through Ayathil.

== Importance ==
Ayathil is a healthcare hub of Kollam city. Ayathil junction connects National Highway 66 with Kollam-Kulathupuzha road and Ayathil-Pallimukku road. There are four multi-speciality hospitals situated in Ayathil-Mevaram stretch of National Highway 66 in Kollam city. Sree Narayana Institute of Technology a college in Kollam city that runs Master of Computer Applications courses. Younus College of Engineering & Technology is another professional college situated close to Ayathil.

Ayathil is one of the major power suppliers of Kollam city. LDF ruled Kerala Government have upgraded 66kV Electrical substation in Ayathil to 110kV for boosting the power supply in Kollam. Now it is one among the 116 Electrical substations in Kerala with 110kV power. The Government of Kerala has laid the foundation stone for Rs.30 crore Gas Insulated Substation (GIS) project to supply power to Kollam city. Kollam is the fourth city in Kerala (after Ernakulam, Thiruvananthapuram and Kozhikode) to receive a Gas Insulated Substation (GIS) project for uninterrupted power supply in the city. Underground cables from Kavanad and Ayathil substations feed the Kollam GIS.

== Major institutions near Ayathil ==
- Travancore Medical College Hospital, Kollam
- N.S Co-operative Multispeciality Hospital
- N.S Ayurveda Hospital
- Meditrina Hospital
- Ashtamudi Hospital
- Popular Maruti
- Popular Hyundai
- AMW
- Daiwik Fiat
- Mohandas TATA

== Government Offices, Central and State ==
Post Office. Pin. 691021 (type Branch Office)
