= Kallumthazham =

Kallumthazham Kallumthaazham
- Neighbourhood
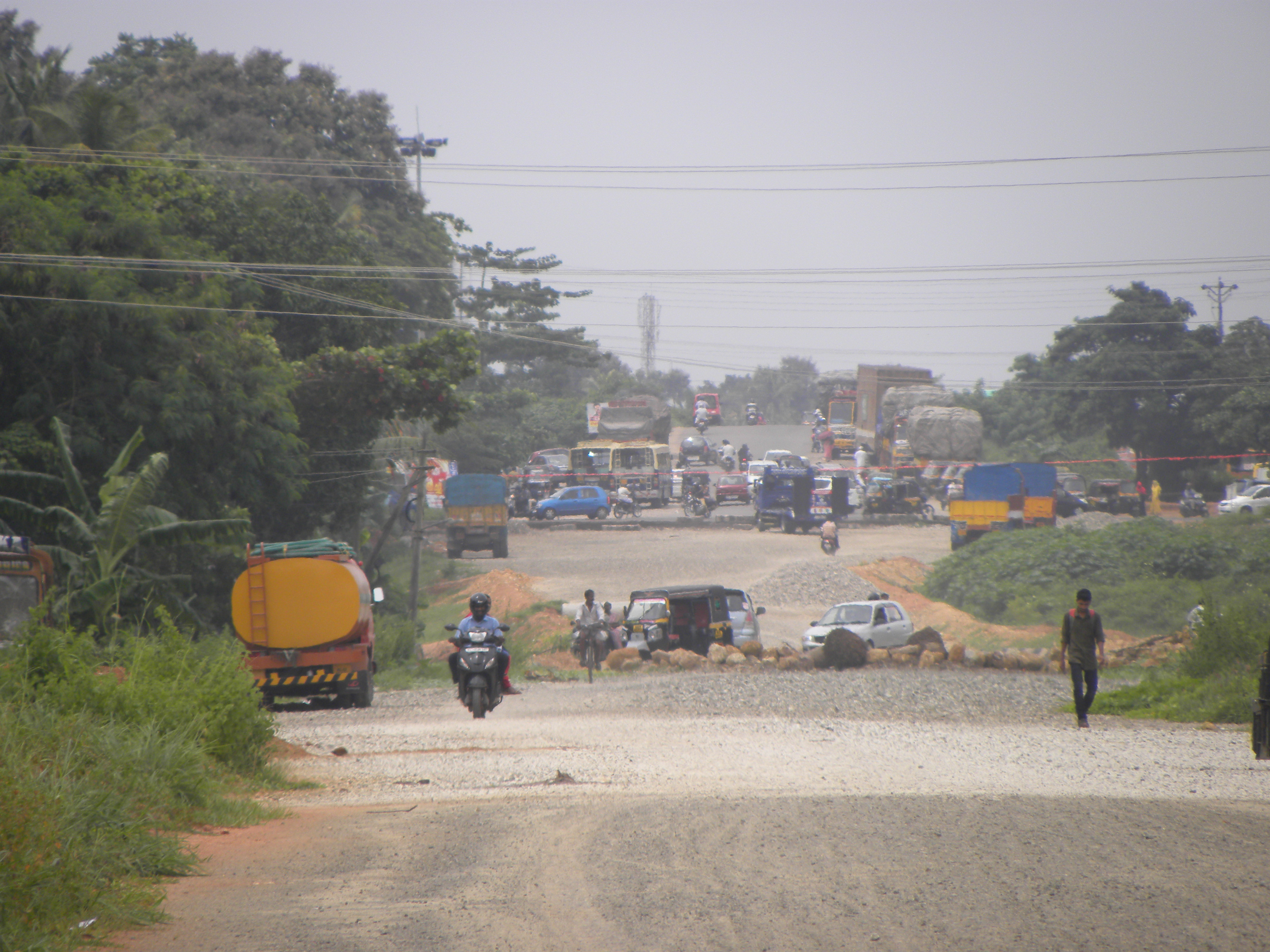
- View of Kallumthazham Junction from Kollam Bypass

- Location within Kollam Location within Kerala
- Coordinates: 8°54′14″N 76°37′22″E
- Country: India
- State: Kerala
- City: Kollam
- Municipal Zone: Kilikollur

Government
  - Body: Kollam Municipal Corporation(KMC)

Languages
  - Official: Malayalam, English
- Time zone: UTC+5:30 (IST)
- PIN: 691004
- Vehicle registration: KL-02
- Lok Sabha constituency: Kollam
- Civic agency: Kollam Municipal Corporation
- Avg. summer temperature: 34 °C (93 °F)
- Avg. winter temperature: 22 °C (72 °F)
- Website: www.kollamcorporation.gov.in

Kallumthazham or Kallumthaazham is a neighbourhood of Kollam city in Kerala, India. It is the 19th ward of Kollam Municipal Corporation.

== Importance ==
Kallumthazham comes under Kilikollur zone of Kollam Municipal Corporation where the most cashew processing factories are located in India. It is the meeting point of two major national highways, with NH-66 Bypass, Kollam and NH-744, passing through the city. It is considered one of the major transport hubs in Kollam city. The Valiya Koonambaikulam temple is very close to Kallumthazham.

== See also ==
- Kollam
- Kollam Bypass
- National Highway 66 (India)
- National Highway 744 (India)
- Kilikollur
