= Mevaram =

- Neighbourhood
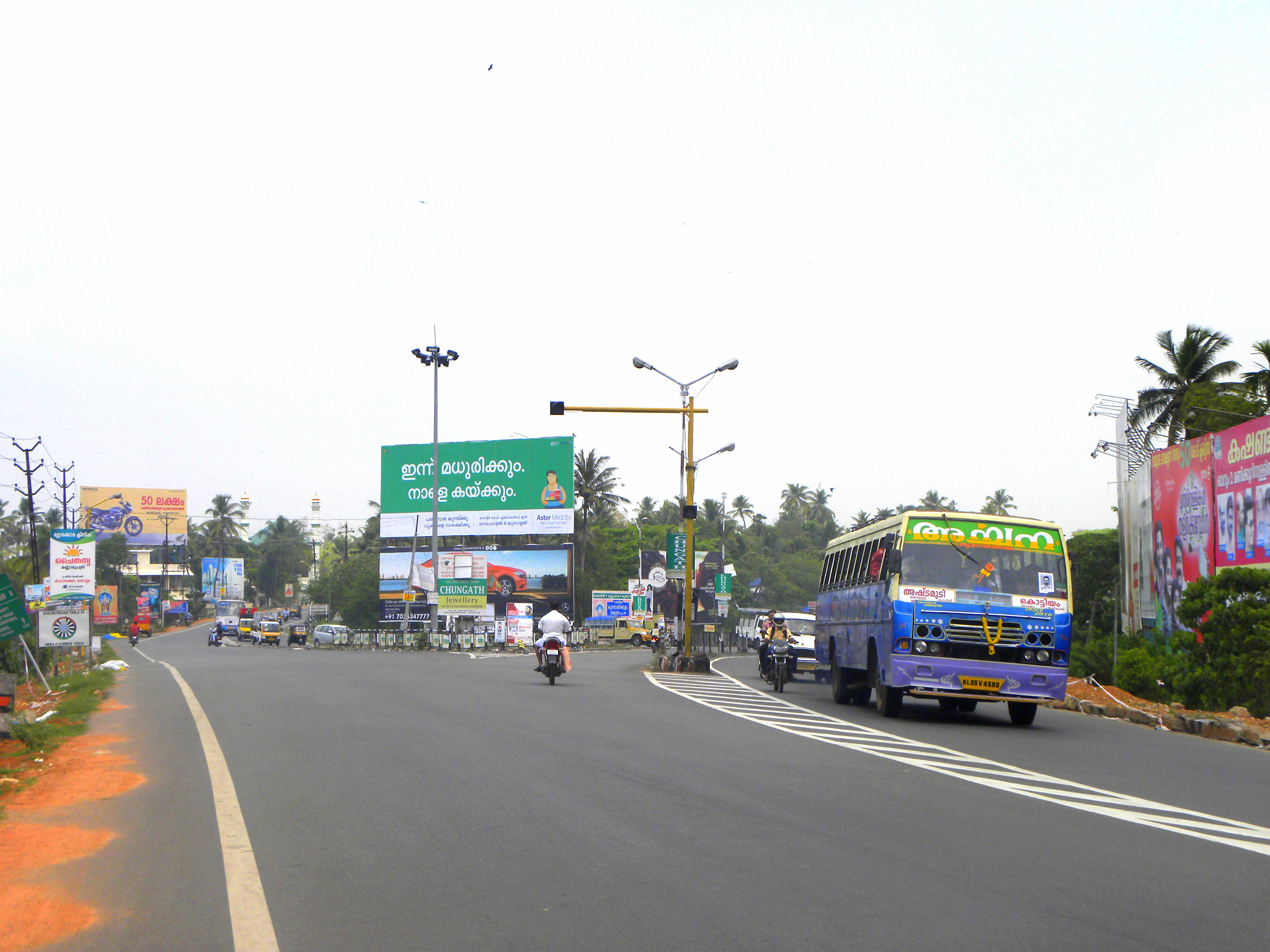
- Kollam Bypass at Mevaram

- Location in Kollam, India Mevaram (Kerala) Mevaram (India)
- Coordinates: 8.868936°N 76.643635°E
- Country: India
- City: Kollam
- City Zone: Eravipuram

Government
  - Type: Council
  - Body: Kollam Municipal Corporation, Mayyanad Panchayat
  - MP: N.K Premachandran
  - MLA: M.Noushad

Languages
  - Official: Malayalam, English
- Time zone: UTC+5:30 (IST)
- PIN: 691020
- Vehicle registration: KL-02
- Avg. summer temperature: 33 °C (91 °F)
- Avg. winter temperature: 21 °C (70 °F)
- Website: http://www.kollam.nic.in

Mevaram, is a neighbourhood and a junction in the city of Kollam in the Indian state of Kerala. The Kollam Bypass, which forms part of National Highway-66, begins from Mevaram junction. Mevaram is located at the borders of Kollam Municipal Corporation. It is the southern tip of Kollam City.

== Mevaram-Emerging healthcare hub of Kollam ==
Mevaram is now a hot spot of Kollam city due to the presence of high number of super-speciality hospitals. Travancore Medicity Medical College, Meditrina Hospital (Kollam's tertiary care hospital), N. S. Memorial Institute of Medical Sciences (South Kerala's largest co-operative hospital), N.S Ayurveda Hospital, Ashtamudi Hospital & Trauma Care Centre (an initiative from a group of doctors) are hospitals in the Mevaram-Ayathil stretch.

== Institutions and hospitals near Mevaram ==
- Travancore Medical College Hospital, Kollam
- N. S. Memorial Institute of Medical Sciences
- N.S. Ayurveda Hospital
- Meditrina Hospital, Ayathil
- Ashtamudi Hospital
- Sarathy true value
- Muthoot Tata
- AMW
- BeMax Academy
- Vadakkevila Co-operative Bank Mevaram Branch
- Lalas Convention Center
- Grand Auditorium

== Nearby towns ==
- Kottiyam
- Kollam

== See also ==
- Chinnakada
- Kollam Junction railway station
