= Valiya Koonambaikulam Temple =

Valiya Koonambaikulam temple
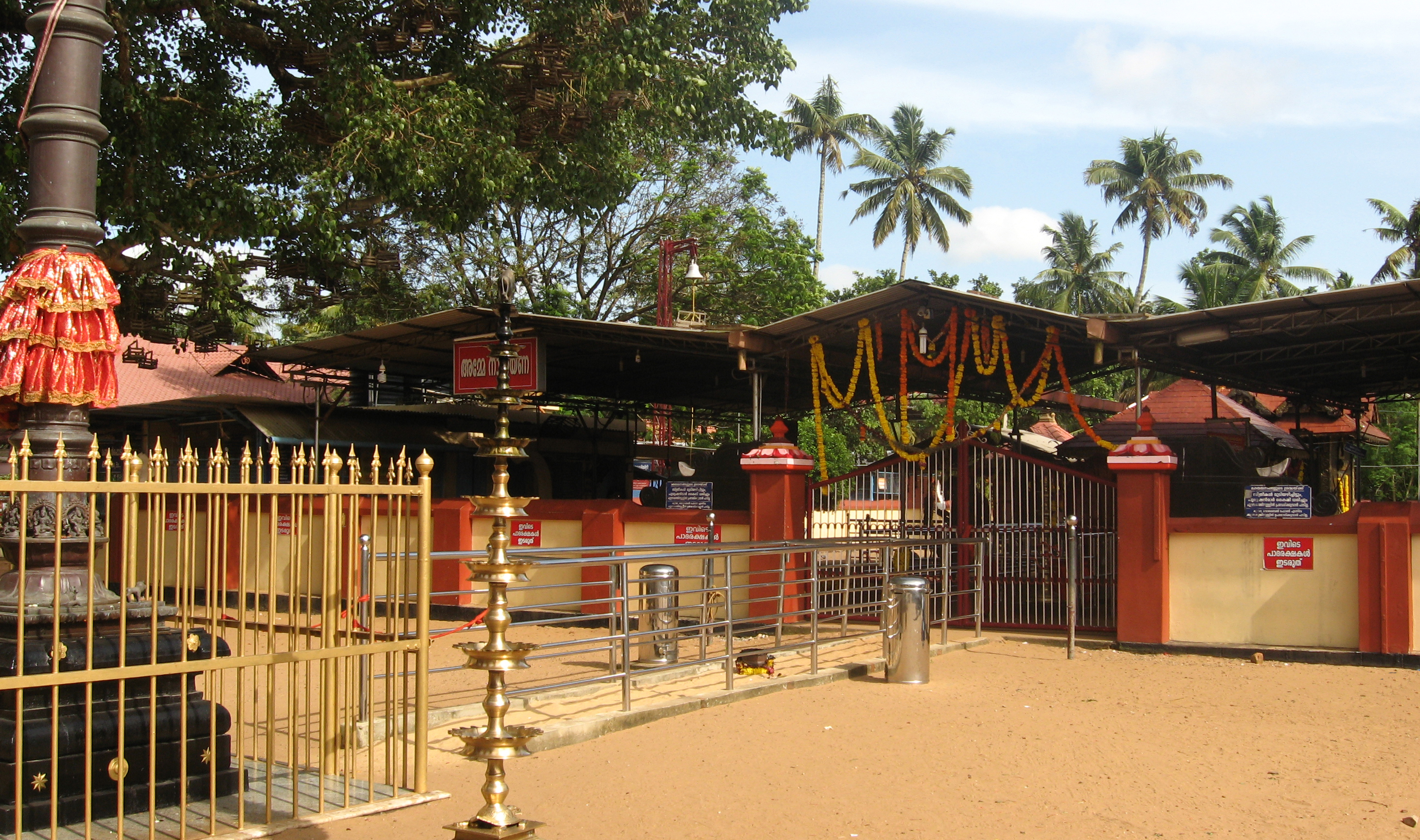
- Valiya Koonambaikulam Sree Bhadrakali temple

- Valiya Koonambaikulam Bhadrakali Temple, Vadakkevila, Kollam, Kerala

Religion
- Affiliation: Hinduism
- District: Kollam
- Deity: Bhadrakali
- Festival: Kumbha Bharani Maholsavam

Location
- Location: Vadakkevila
- State: Kerala
- Country: India
- Coordinates: 8°52′44.9″N 76°37′55.8″E

Architecture
- Type: Kerala style
- Elevation: 35.25 m (116 ft)

Valiya Koonambaikulam temple or Valia Koonampayikulam temple is a Hindu temple located at Koonambaikulam near Vadakkevila in Kollam district of Kerala in India. This is one of the most ancient temples in Kerala and is dedicated to Bhadrakali (popularly known as 'Koonambaikulathamma', which means The mother of Koonambaikulam). The temple is under the control of Valiya Koonambaikulam Sree Bhadrakali Kshetra Trust. The trust owns an Engineering college called Valia Koonambaikulathamma College of Engineering and Technology (VKCET) at Parippally in Kollam district.

The daily worship at the temple begins at 04:00 and ends at 21:00 local time. An important annual festival of the temple is the 'Kumbha Bharani Maholsavam' which is held in the Bharani Nakshatra of Kumbham, the month corresponding to February or March in Kollam era. Thousands of women are participating in the Chandra Pongal ritual organised in connection with the festival every year.
