= Kottiyam =

- Town
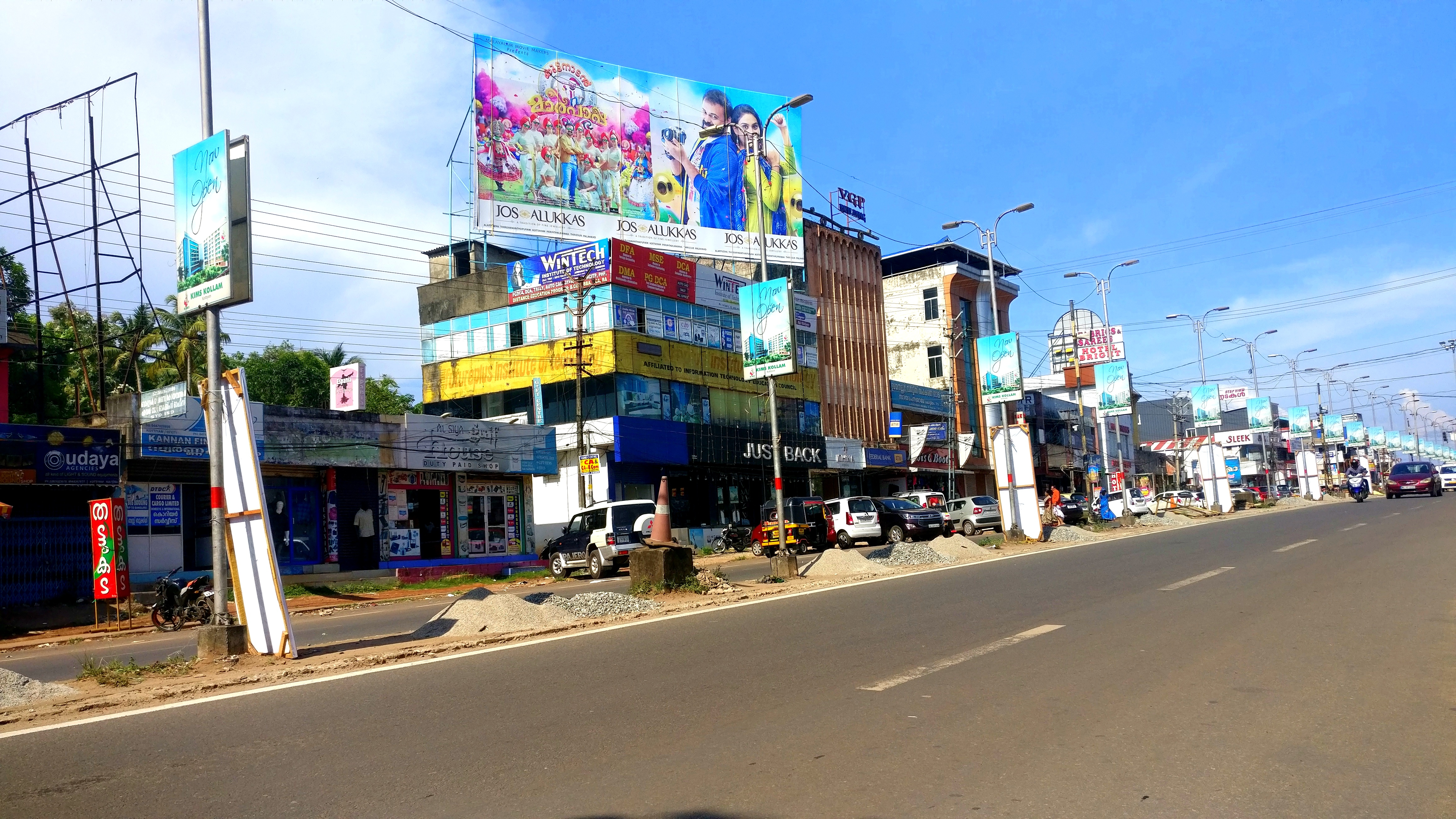
- Kottiyam Town
- Interactive map of Kottiyam
- Coordinates: 8°51′44″N 76°40′12″E
- Country: India
- State: Kerala
- District: Kollam

Government
  - Type: Panchayath
  - Body: Adichanalloor, Mayyanad

Languages
  - Official: Malayalam, English
- Time zone: UTC+5:30 (IST)
- PIN: 691571
- Telephone code: 0474
- Vehicle registration: KL-02
- Nearest city: Kollam (Quilon)
- Lok Sabha constituency: Kollam

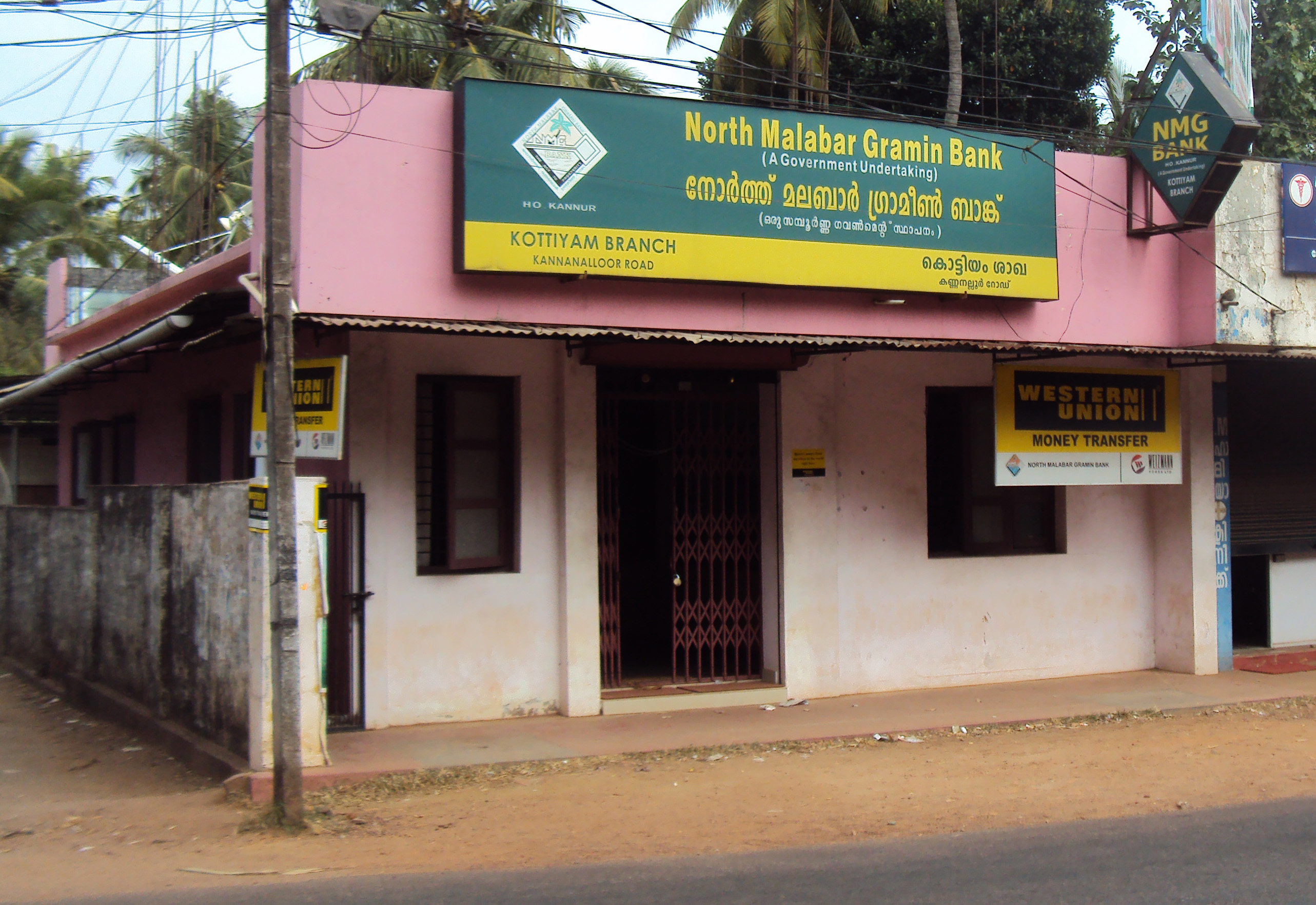
Village Bank in Kottiyam

Kottiyam is a suburban town located at the southern end of Kollam city in Kollam district, Kerala, India. The town is home to many popular educational institutions, hospitals, restaurants, hotels, and retail stores. Kottiyam is strategically located and therefore a regular stopover for long-distance travellers wishing to freshen up during their journeys.

== Geographical location ==
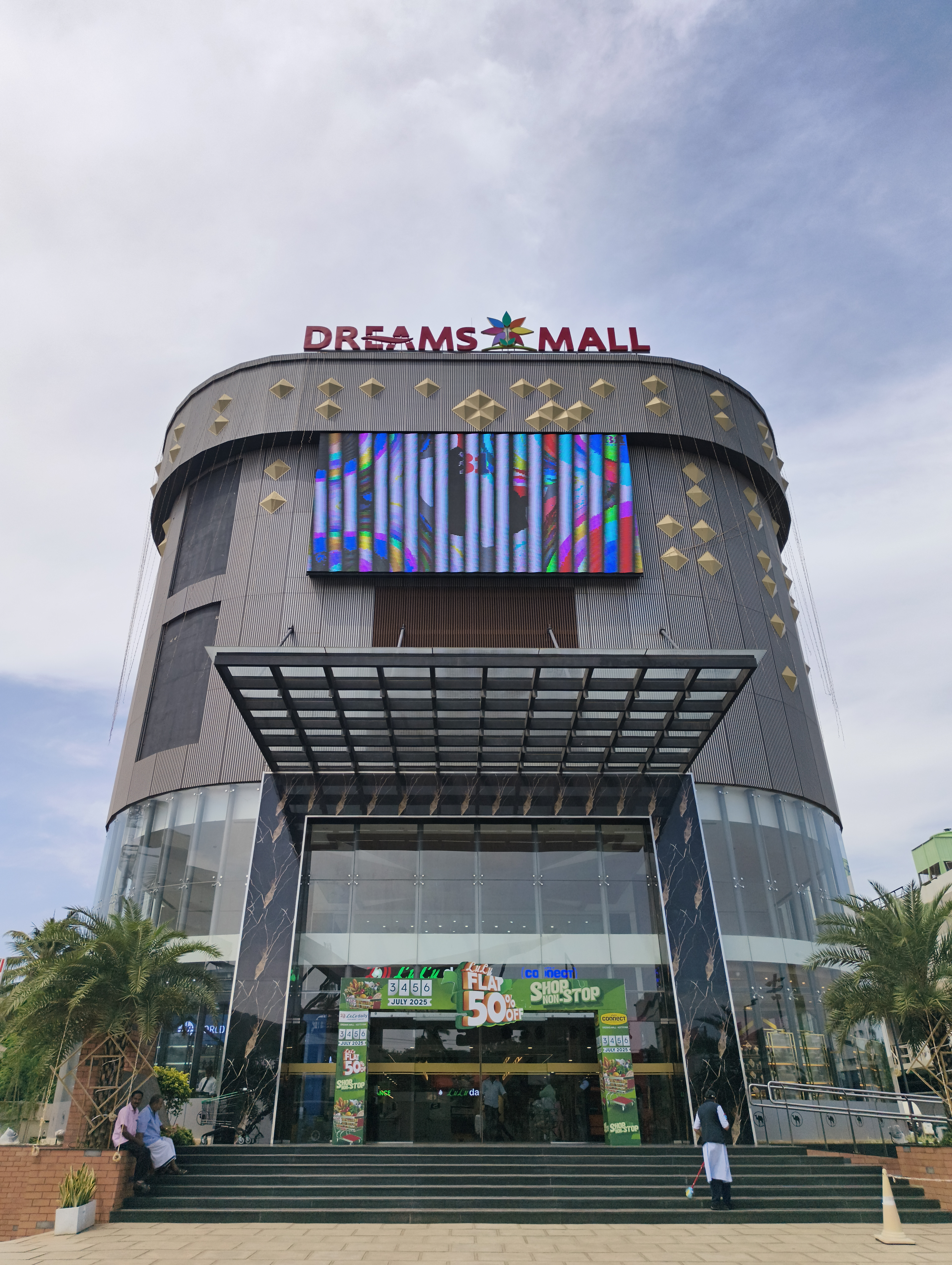
Dreams Mall (Lulu Hyper Market), Kottiyam

Kottiyam is on the National Highway 66 between Kazhakoottam town and Kollam City. There are regular bus services from Kollam City. It is at a distance of around 12 km (7.5 mi) from Kollam and 11 km (6.8 mi) from Paravur.

The nearest major railway station is Kollam Junction. Mayyanad and Paravur railway stations are closer, but only some passenger trains and a few express trains halt there. Trivandrum International Airport is the nearest airport, located at a distance of 60 km (37 mi).

== Administration ==
2025 Local Body Election – Adichanalloor Grama Panchayat
Ward No	Ward name	Member	Party	Alliance
1	Thazhuthala	Rohini Dileep	BJP	NDA
2	Punchirichira	Biji Rajendran	BJP	NDA
3	Alumkadavu	Bindu Dharman	INC	UDF
4	Plakkad	T. S. Binoy	BJP	NDA
5	Farmers Bank	Mini Subhash	BJP	NDA
6	Kundumon	Nisar Chirakkada	INC	UDF
7	Adichanalloor	Sudhabhai	CPI(M)	LDF
8	Velichikala	Shaji L	INC	UDF
9	Kumalloor	Sheeja J L	INC	UDF
10	Kattachal	Lathika Shivadasan	CPI(M)	LDF
11	Kaithakuzhi	S. Sreelal	BJP	NDA
12	Mylakkadu	Raghunathan Pillai R	BJP	NDA
13	Ethikkara	Shijila Safeer	CPI(M)	LDF
14	Manamkunnu	Sandhya Kumari	CPI(M)	LDF
15	Ottaplamoodu	Jinokki Edward	CPI(M)	LDF
16	Kottiyam South	Thasbeena Shajan	CPI(M)	LDF
17	West Mylakkad	R. Kalajadevi	INC	UDF
18	Kottiyam East	Rupesh Kumar	BJP	NDA
19	Venmanichira	R. Sajan	INC	UDF
20	Kottiyam	J. Saraswathi	CPI(M)	LDF
21	Thazhuthala South	Ajmeer	CPI(M)	LDF

== Kottiyam town and Adichanalloor Panchayath ==
A major portion of Kottiyam town is located in Adichanalloor Panchayath. Adichanalloor is a special grade grama panchayath in Kollam.

== Institutions for higher education ==
- MM NSS COLLEGE, Kottiyam
- OGTM Skills Academy, Kottiyam
- S.N Polytechnic College, Kottiyam
- Travancore Medical College Hospital, Kollam
- N. S. Memorial Institute of Medical Sciences

== Hospitals ==
- Travancore Medical College Hospital, Kollam
- N. S. Memorial Institute of Medical Sciences
- Holycross Hospital, Kottiyam
- KIMS Health, Kottiyam
