= N. S. Memorial Institute of Medical Sciences =

Coordinates: 8.8799°N 76.6405°E

- Kollam District Co-operative Hospital Society
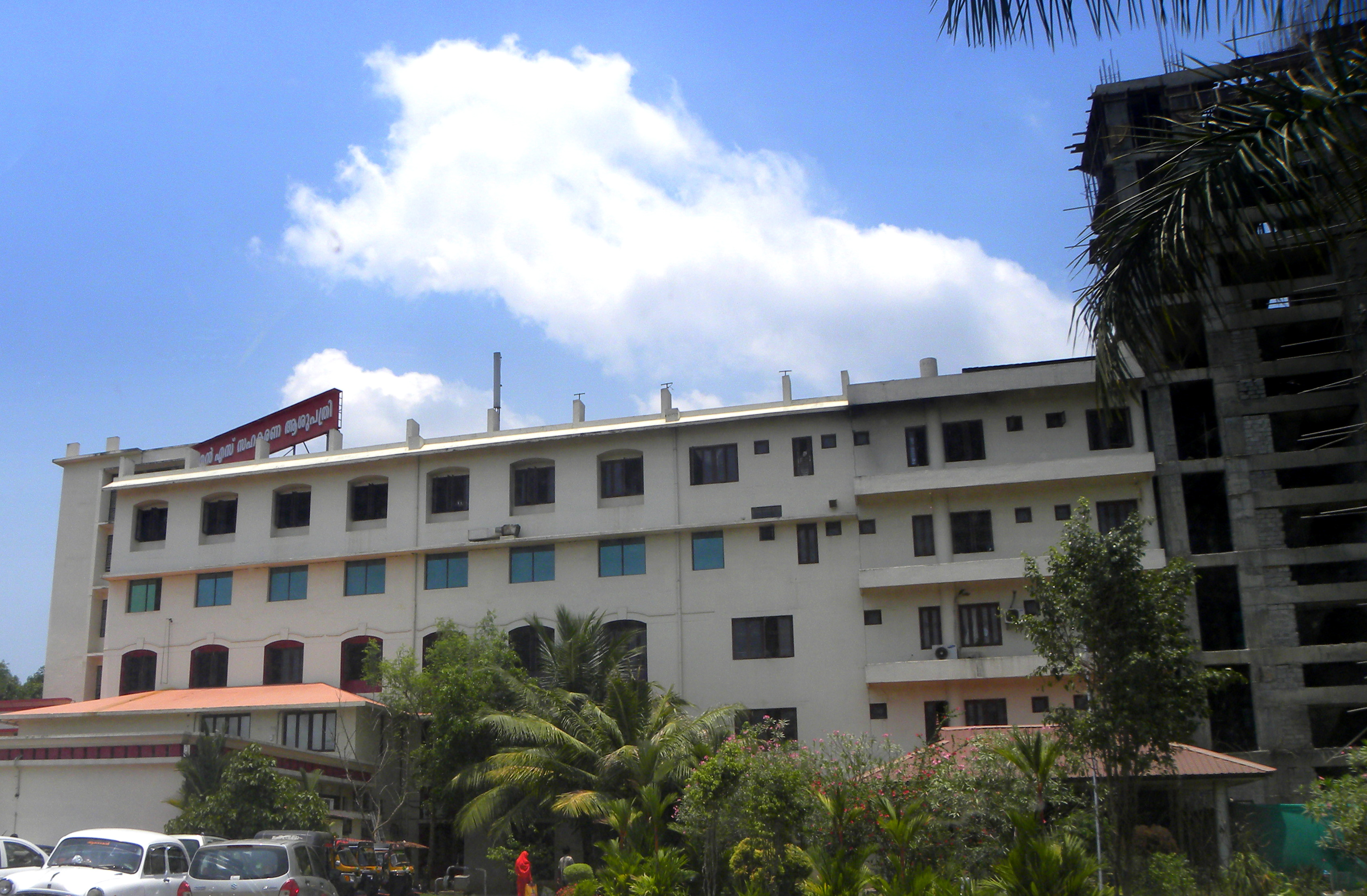
- N. S. Memorial Institute of Medical Sciences

Geography
- Location: Palathara, Kollam, Kerala, India

Organisation
- Care system: Co-operative Hospital
- Type: Specialist

Services
- Emergency department: Accident & Emergency
- Beds: 500

History
- Founded: 2000

Links
- Website: www.nshospital.org

N. S. Memorial Institute of Medical Sciences (NSMIMS) is a co-operative hospital located at Palathara in Kollam, India. It was founded in 2000 in memory of N. Sreedharan (died 1985), a communist organizer who was a member of the secretariat of the Communist Party of India (Marxist). This is the first Co-operative Multi Super Specialty Hospital in South Kerala. The hospital has 32 specialty departments and 95 doctors including 25 post graduate doctors and more than 950 medical and paramedical staff. It has a full range of services.

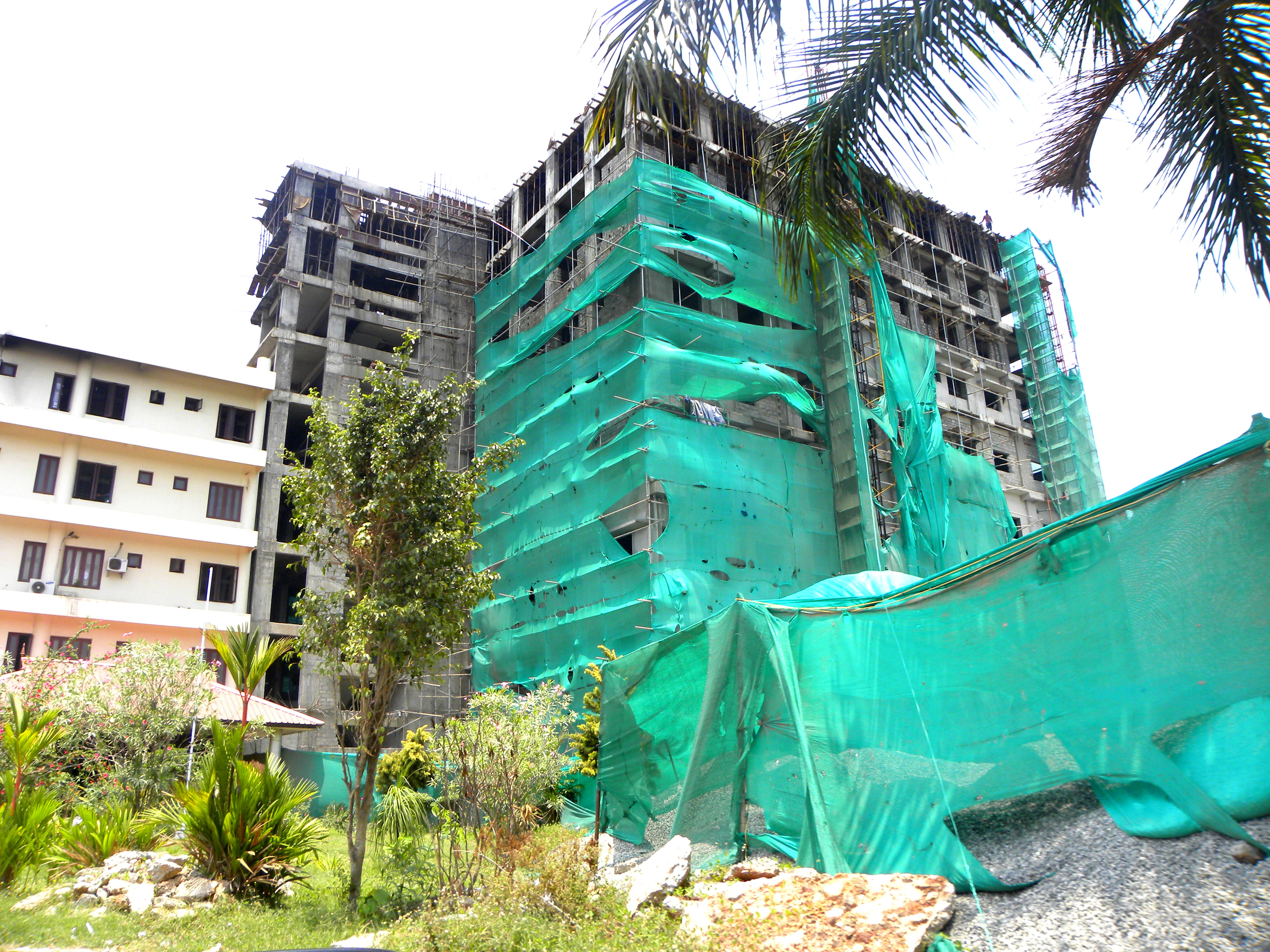
New block under construction at N. S. Memorial Institute of Medical Sciences, Kollam

== History ==
NSMIMS was established in 2000 in a temporary facility. The hospital started functioning fully from 2006 after being inaugurated by Prakash Karat, General Secretary of Communist Party of India (Marxist).

== Location ==
NSMIMS is situated 6 kilometers from Kollam railway station and 60 kilometers from Trivandrum International Airport alongside Kollam Bypass of National Highway 66.

- Kollam Junction railway station - 6 km
- Kollam KSRTC Bus Station - 7 km
- Kollam Port - 7.5 km
- Kollam Asramam Helipad - 6.5 km

== Departments ==
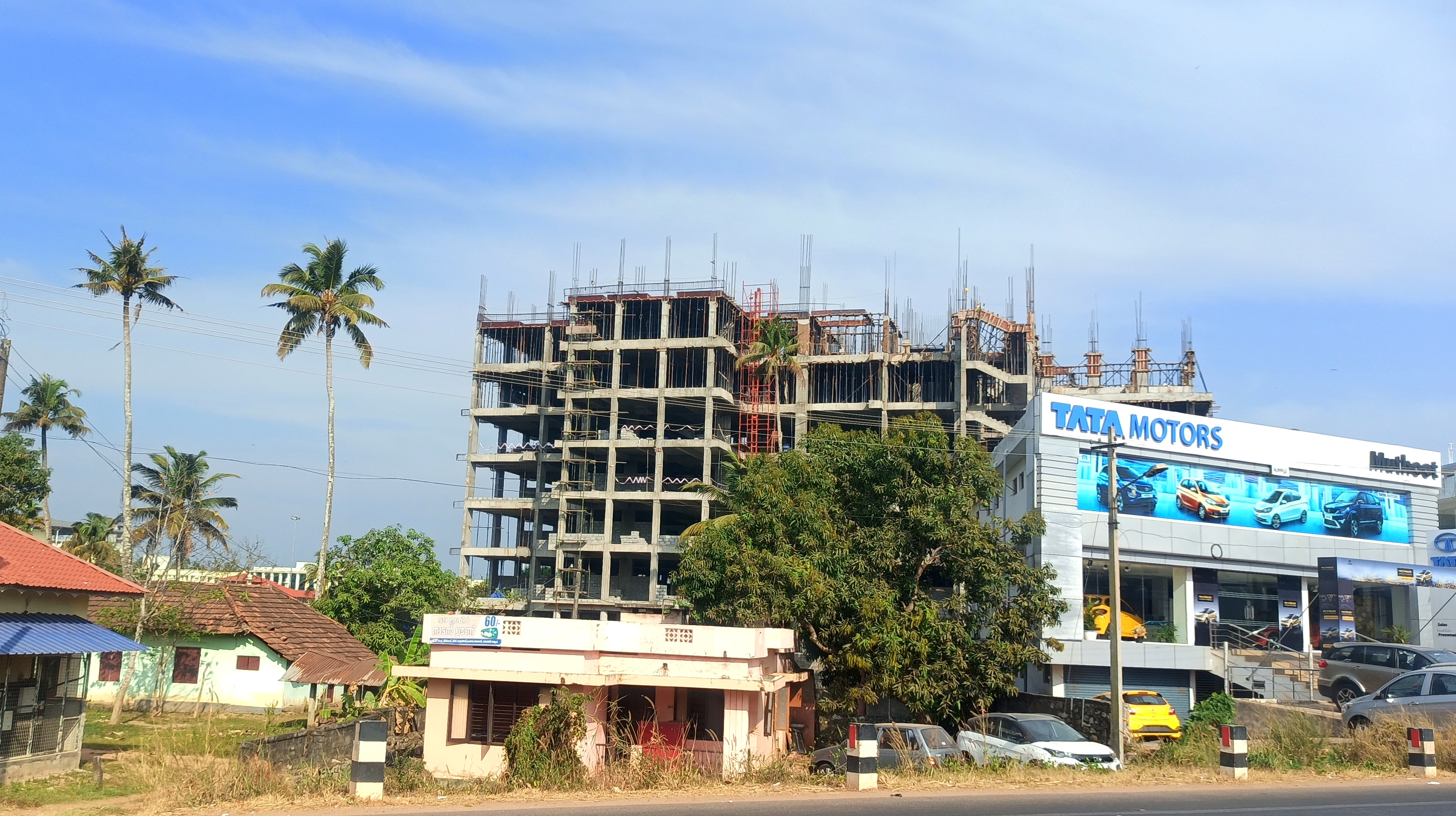
Cancer Care Centre, as part of N.S Mediland project, under construction at Palathara in Kollam Bypass area

- Neurology
- Anesthesiology
- Obstetrics and Gynecology
- Cardiology
- Pharmacy
- Ophthalmology
- Plasticand Cosmetic Surgery
- Urology
- Dermatology
- Pulmonology/Critical Care
- Nephrology
- Orthopedics and Traumatology
- Gastroendoscopic Surgery
- Dental and Oral Diseases
- ENT, Head and Neck Surgery
- Reproductive Medicine
- General and Laparoscopic Surgery
- General Medicine and Diabetology
- Pediatrics and Neonatology
- Physical Medicine and Rehabilitation
- Clinical Laboratory
- Radiology
- Casualty and Emergencies
- ART

== Nursing college ==
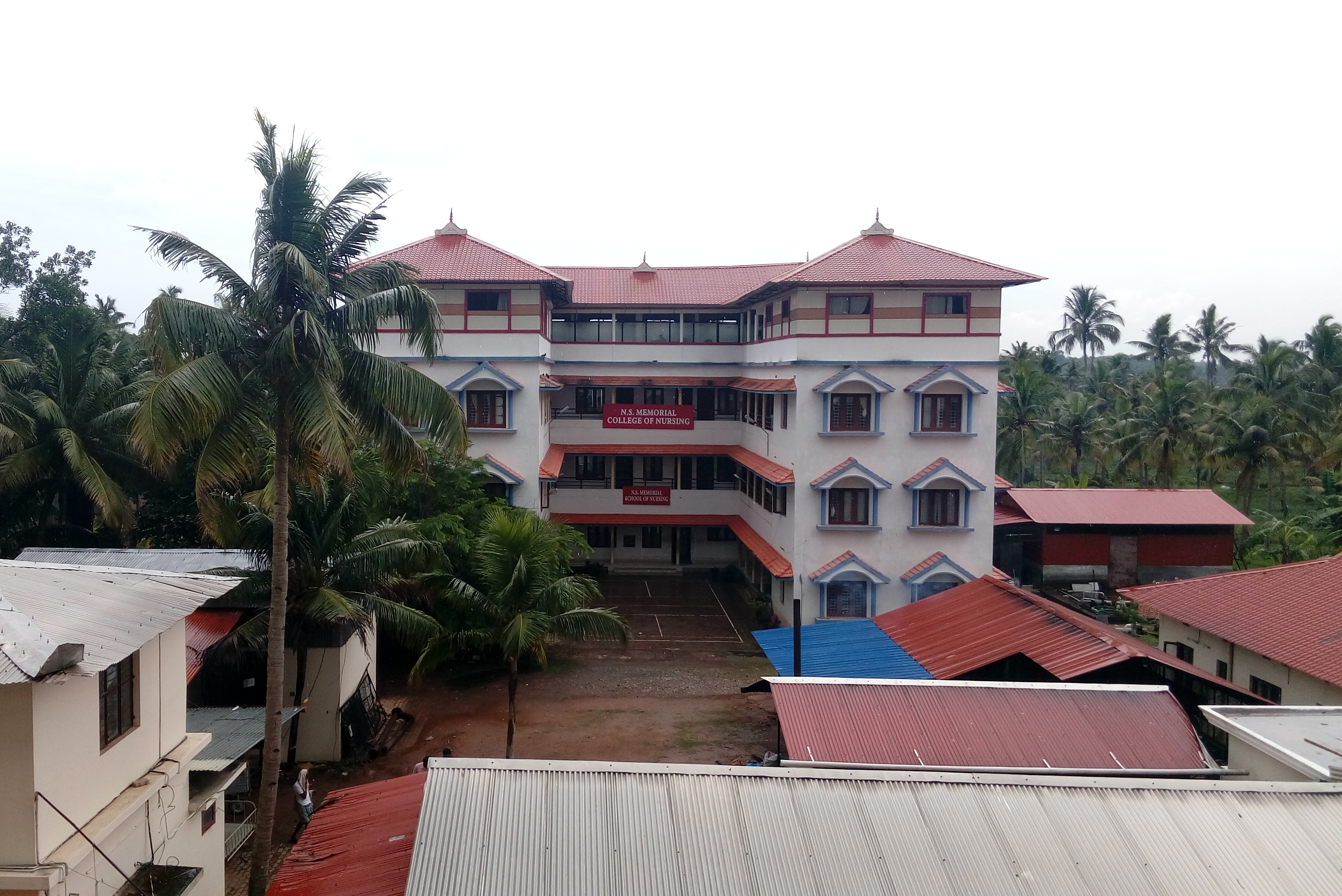
N.S Memorial College of Nursing, Ayathil, Kollam

N.S. Memorial Nursing School has started functioning. The nursing school building opened in 2011 and has facilities to accommodate 200 students. The society has started a B.Sc. Nursing course.
