= Kollam Bypass =

NH bypass in Kerala

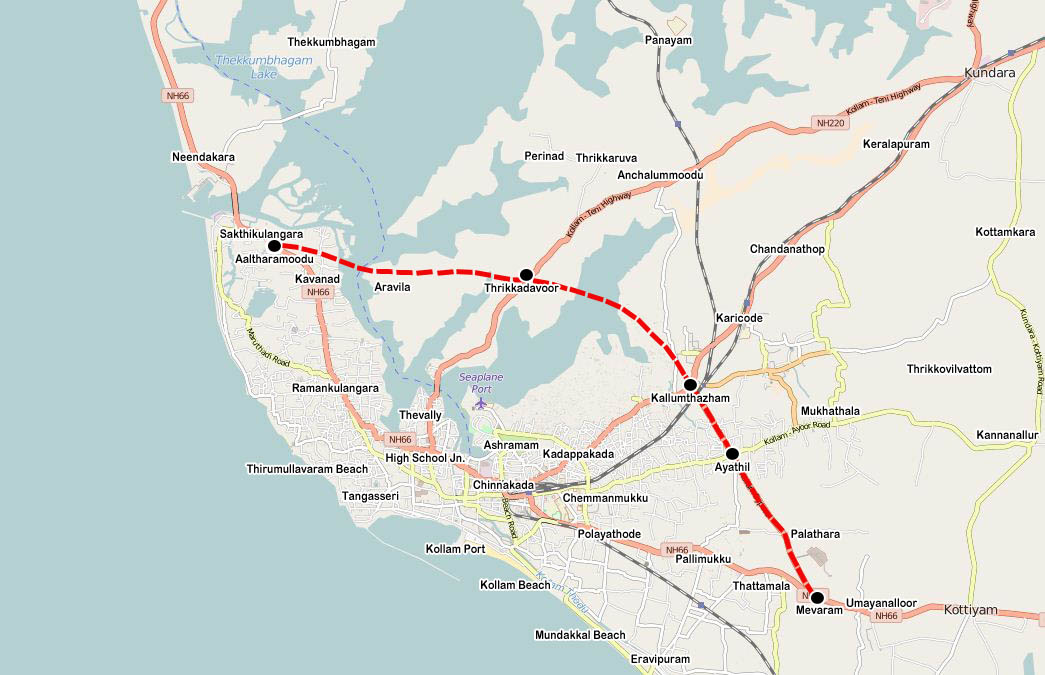

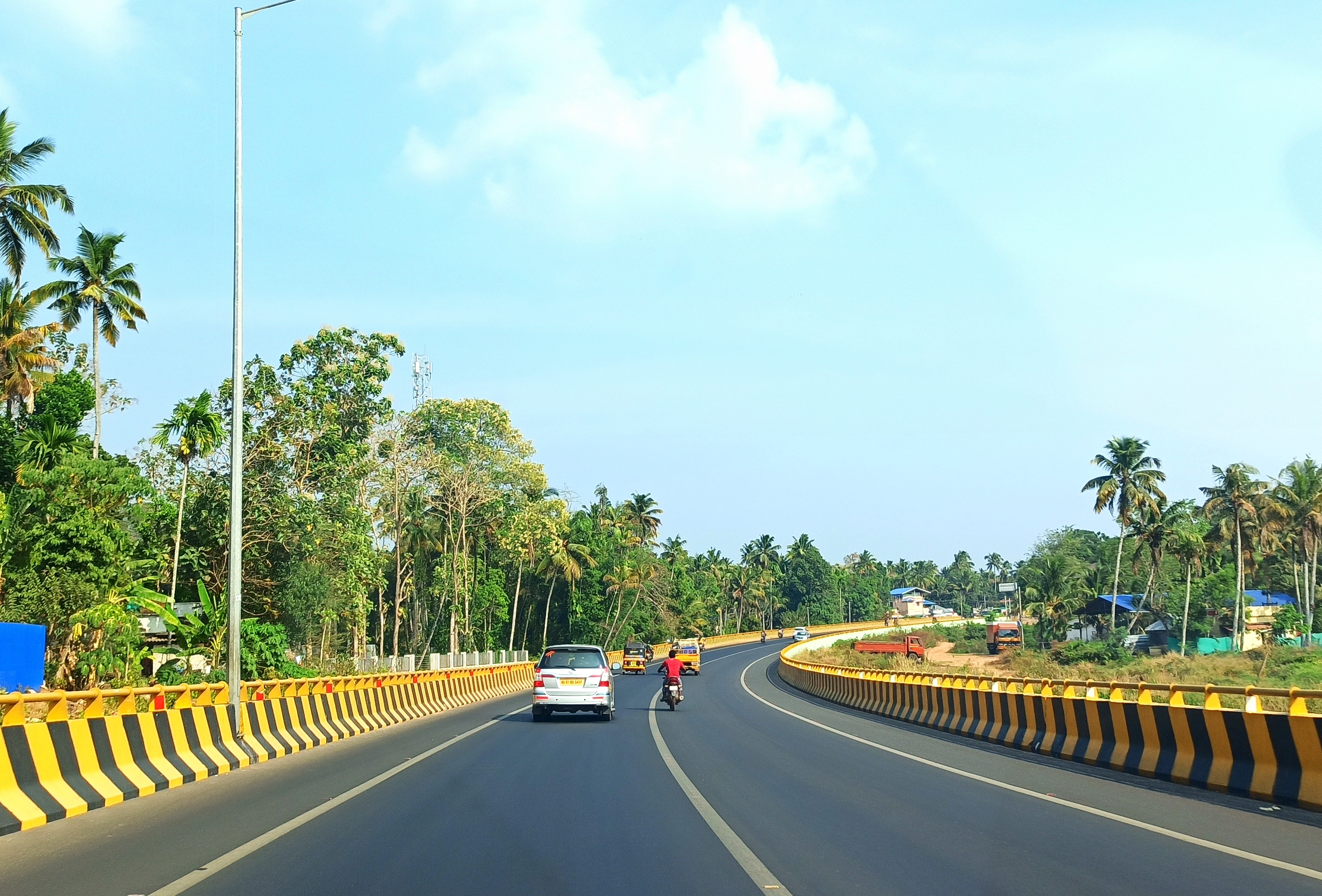
- Kadavoor bridge: Part of Kollam Bypass

Route information
- Maintained by NHAI
- Length: 13.141 km (8.165 mi)
- Status: Operational
- History: 2019-Present Timeline: Planned : 1972; Approval : 1978; Phase-I : 1993; Phase-II : 1999; Phase-III : 2019

Major junctions
- South end: NH-66 in Mevaram
- Kollam-Kulathupuzha road in Ayathil; NH-744 in Kallumthazham; NH-183 in Kadavoor; Kureepuzha road in Aravila
- North end: NH-66 in Kavanad

Location
- Country: India
- Major cities: Kollam

Highway system
- Roads in India; Expressways; National; State; Asian

Kollam Bypass is a part of NH 66 that bypasses CBD of Kollam city in Kerala, India. The busy 13.141 km long bypass starts at Mevaram in the south to Kavanad in the north, via Ayathil, Kallumthazham, Kadavoor and Kureepuzha in Kollam city. It is a joint venture between the central and state government. It was inaugurated on 15 January 2019 by Prime Minister Narendra Modi.

== History ==
Government of Kerala had proposed Kollam bypass project in 1972. The then Public Works Department minister Mr. T. K. Divakaran was the man behind Kollam bypass project. The earlier plan was to construct a bypass road through Kollam city via Olayil, Thevally, Vellayittambalam. But T. K. Divakaran denied that proposal and asked to re-draw the plan through Mevaram, Ayathil, Kallumthazham, Kavanad route and then mooted the bypass plan as per the new route. Later in 1993, a stretch of 3 km from Mevaram to Ayathil was completed and 1.5 km Ayathil-Kallumthazham stretch was completed in 1999 and the remaining Kallumthazham-Kavanad stretch completed in 2019. This stretch includes three bridges, five culverts, one vehicle underpass, and five major intersections, and needs to pass over the Ashtamudi Lake. The road includes a seven-metre two-lane carriageway, paved shoulders and earthen shoulders. The importance of the Kollam bypass is that it touches 3 major National Highways(NH 66(Formerly known as NH 47), NH 183 (Formerly known as NH 220), NH 744 (Formerly known as NH 208)) passing through the state of Kerala.

The two-lane Kollam Bypass road was inaugurated on 15 January by Prime Minister Narendra Modi. The road is witnessing heavy traffic congestion since its opening. In January 2019, the Government of Kerala and NHAI have decided to widen the road into 45 meters. As per the plan, Kollam Bypass would become a four-lane road with overbridges at Mevaram, Kavanad and underpassages at Ayathil, Kallumthazham and Kadavoor junctions.

=== Timeline ===
Year	Events
1972	Proposal for constructing Bypass road at Kollam and stone laid in February at Kavanad
1975	Token amount allotted for Kollam Bypass project
1978	Permission received from State Road Ministry on 3 May to construct Bypass in Kollam city
1993	3 km long Mevaram-Ayathil stretch of Kollam Bypass completed (Phase-I - Construction cost: ₹3.75cr)
1999	1.5 km long Ayathil-Kallumthazham stretch of Kollam Bypass completed (Phase-II - Construction cost: ₹2.75cr)
2015	Works on 8.6 km long Kallumthazham-Kavanad stretch started on 27 May 2015 (Phase-III - Construction cost: ₹277.24cr)
2019	Kollam NH Bypass inaugurated on 15 January by Prime Minister Narendra Modi

== Project Details ==
- Length: 13.14 km
- Total Construction Cost: ₹3,520,000,000 (US$38 million) (Phase-III: ₹2,772,435,655 (US$30 million))
- Construction Mode: Engineering Procurement Construction(EPC)
- South End: Mevaram
- North End: Kavanad
- Major Bridges: 3 nos (Kadavoor, Neeravil, Kavanad)
- Underpass: 1 nos (Neeravil)*
- ROB: 1 nos (Kallumthazham)*
- No of Pilings: 190 nos
- Piers: 46 nos
- Culverts: 7 nos

*Included in the plan. Not yet started/completed

== Junctions ==
- Kavanad (Towards Mumbai through NH 66)
- Kadavoor (Towards Theni through NH 183 )
- Kallumthazham (Towards Tirumangalam through NH 744)
- Ayathil (Towards Kulathupuzha through State Highway)
- Mevaram (Towards Trivandrum through NH 66)

== Latest developments on bypass project ==
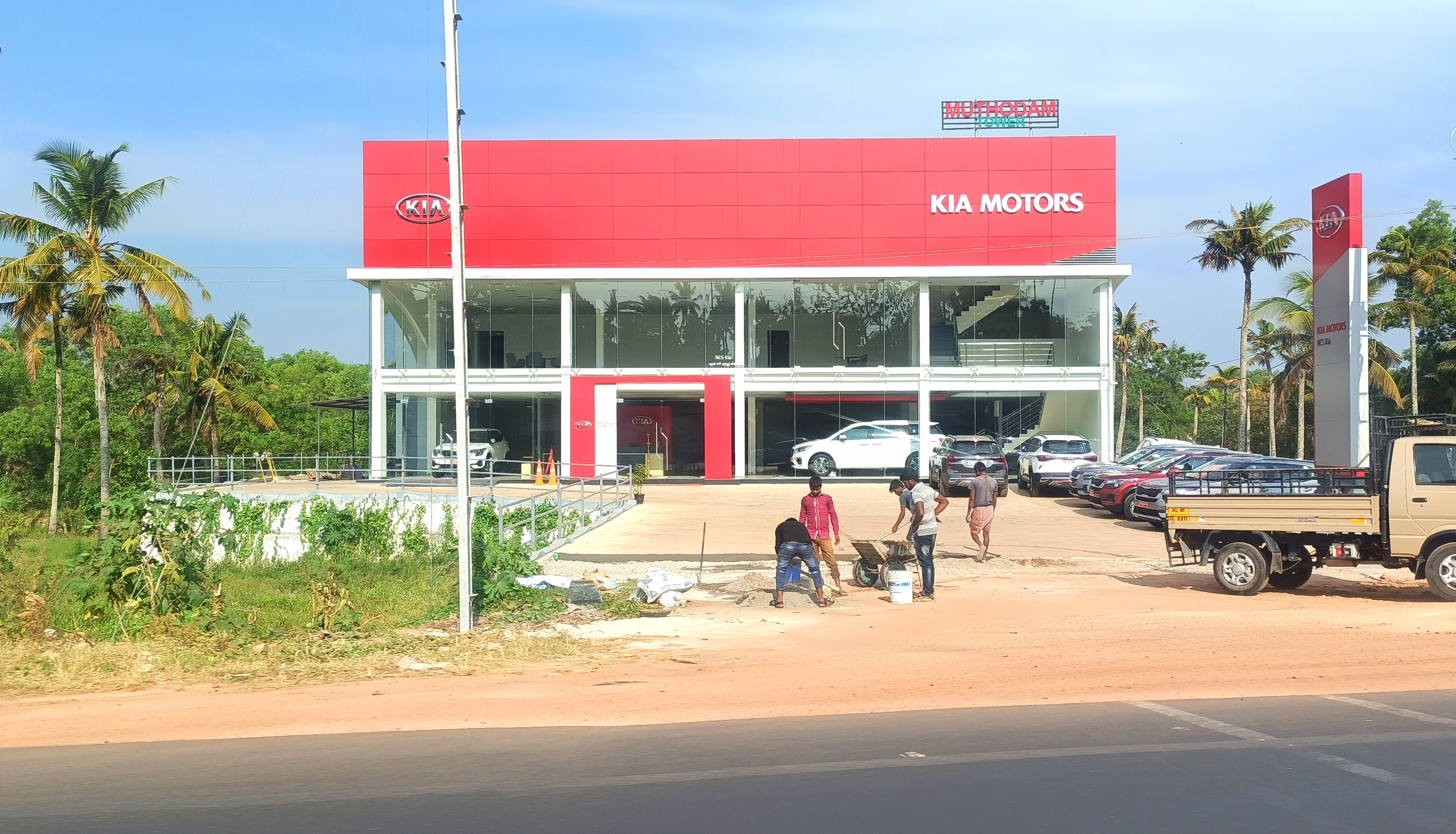
Kia Showroom beside Kollam Bypass

- 18 bidders have qualified for the bypass tender process - April 2014
- Government of India and Government of Kerala have decided to share the cost of Kollam bypass project equally - May 2014
- National Highway Authority of India is planning to re-tender the work with a change in estimate cost.
- Government of India has granted approval for Kollam bypass, a joint venture of the State and the Central governments in January 2015.
- Chief Minister of Kerala Oommen Chandy signed an agreement with a private company on 11 February 2015 to complete the works within 30 months. The total cost for works would be Rs. 352 crore. The Government of Kerala has added the Kollam bypass project to its list of mega projects.
- Cherian Varkey Construction Company(CVCC)-RDS is the contractor for the project. Same company is responsible for the execution of Alappuzha Bypass also. It was an EPC Contract for the construction of 2 Lane Bypass.
- Preliminary works for Kollam bypass has been commenced again on 4 March 2015 after a long gap. Currently, clearing of the way for bypass is going on here. Re-aligning of telephone cables, water pipelines and KSEB feeder lines will commence soon as part of this work.
- Mr. Nitin Gadkari, Union Minister for Road Transport and Highways and Kerala Chief Minister Mr. Oommen Chandy have jointly inaugurated the third phase construction work of Kollam bypass on 10 April 2015.

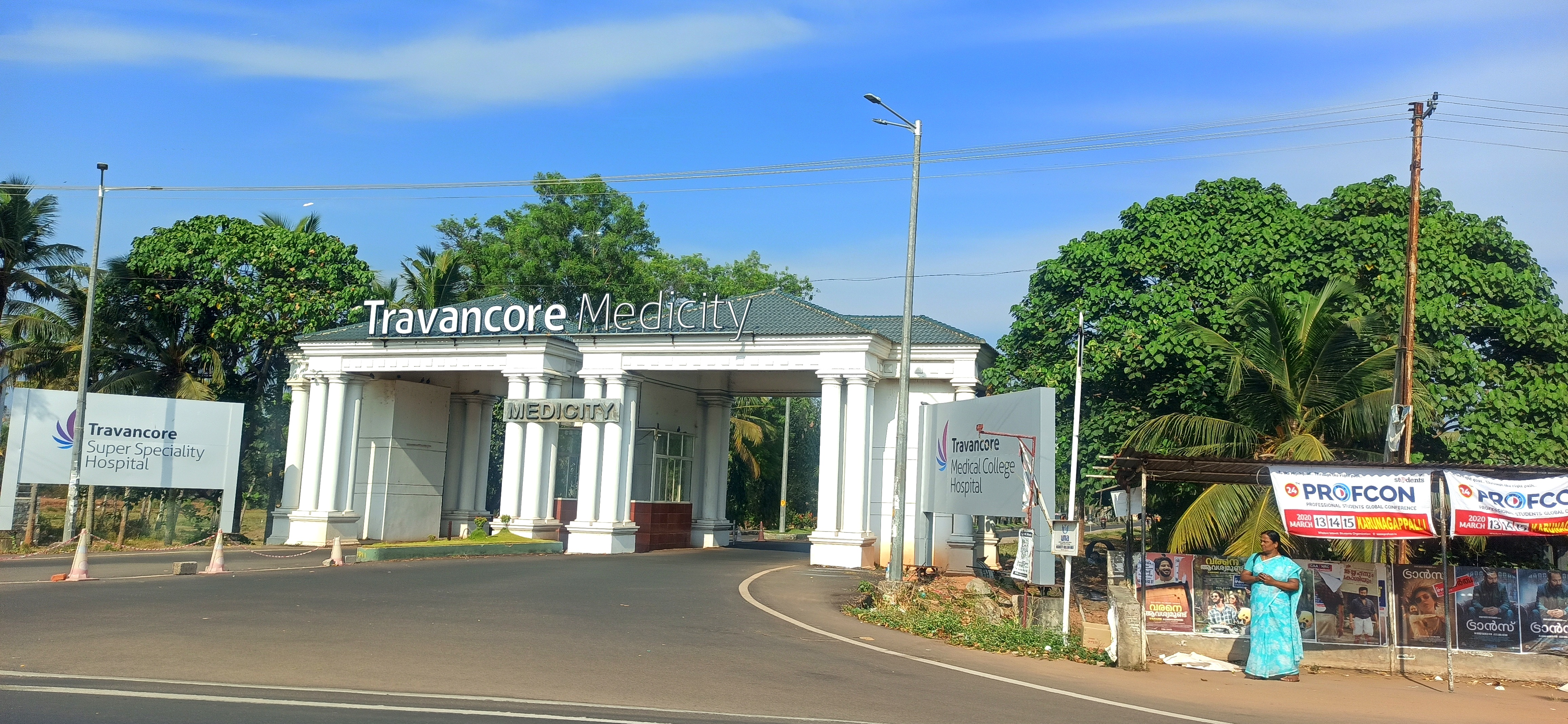
Travancore Medical College Hospital entrance beside Kollam Bypass

- 26 November 2017 is the final deadline for the completion of Kollam Bypass. If the construction company fails to meet the deadline, a fine will be imposed on the company based on the delayed days.
- The construction work comes to a standstill due to the insufficiency of gravel. - October 2016
- In July 2017, Central Minister Pon Radhakrishnan announced that Kollam Bypass work would be completed only by August 2018 due to the scarcity of construction materials and soil to fill the land. Also, Kollam MP N. K. Premachandran announced that the bypass road will be commissioned in August 2018.
- Government of Kerala hopes to open Kollam Bypass by September 2018.
- Kollam bypass will be ready in a month. Street lights would be installed throughout the stretch. - 25 October 2018
- The inauguration of Kollam Bypass will be on 2 February 2019 by Pinarayi Vijayan, Chief Minister of Kerala. - 24 December 2018
- Prime Minister's office confirmed with Kollam MP N. K. Premachandran that Narendra Modi will inaugurate Kollam Bypass on 15 January 2019 - 9 January 2019
- Government of Kerala asked toll exemption to Central Ministry for Kollam bypass - 9 January 2019
- Union Minister Nitin Gadkari gave assurance to Kollam MP N. K. Premachandran regarding Kollam Bypass widening into four lane as a standalone project soon - 1 August 2020

== Gallery ==
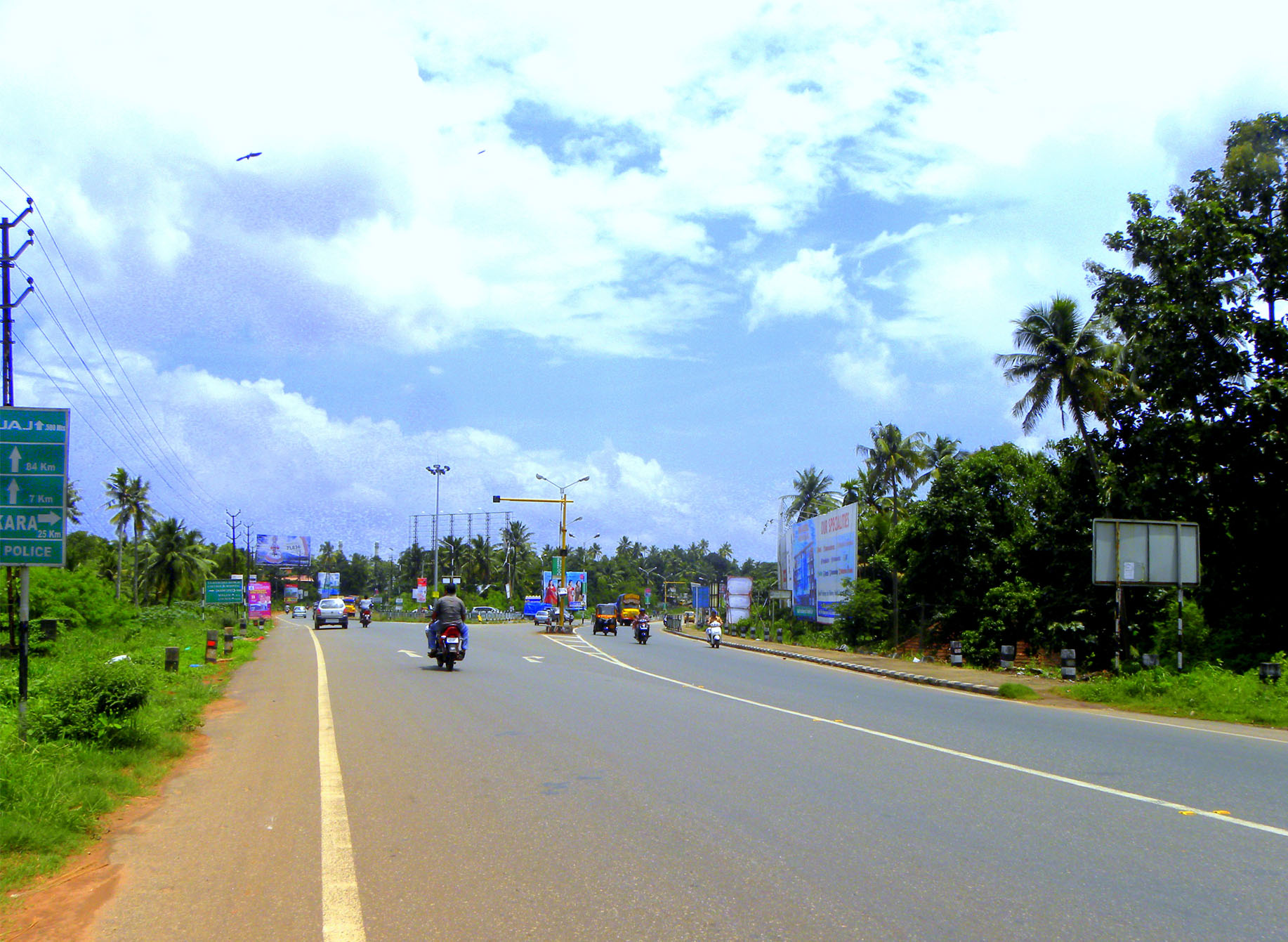
Kollam Bypass at Mevaram

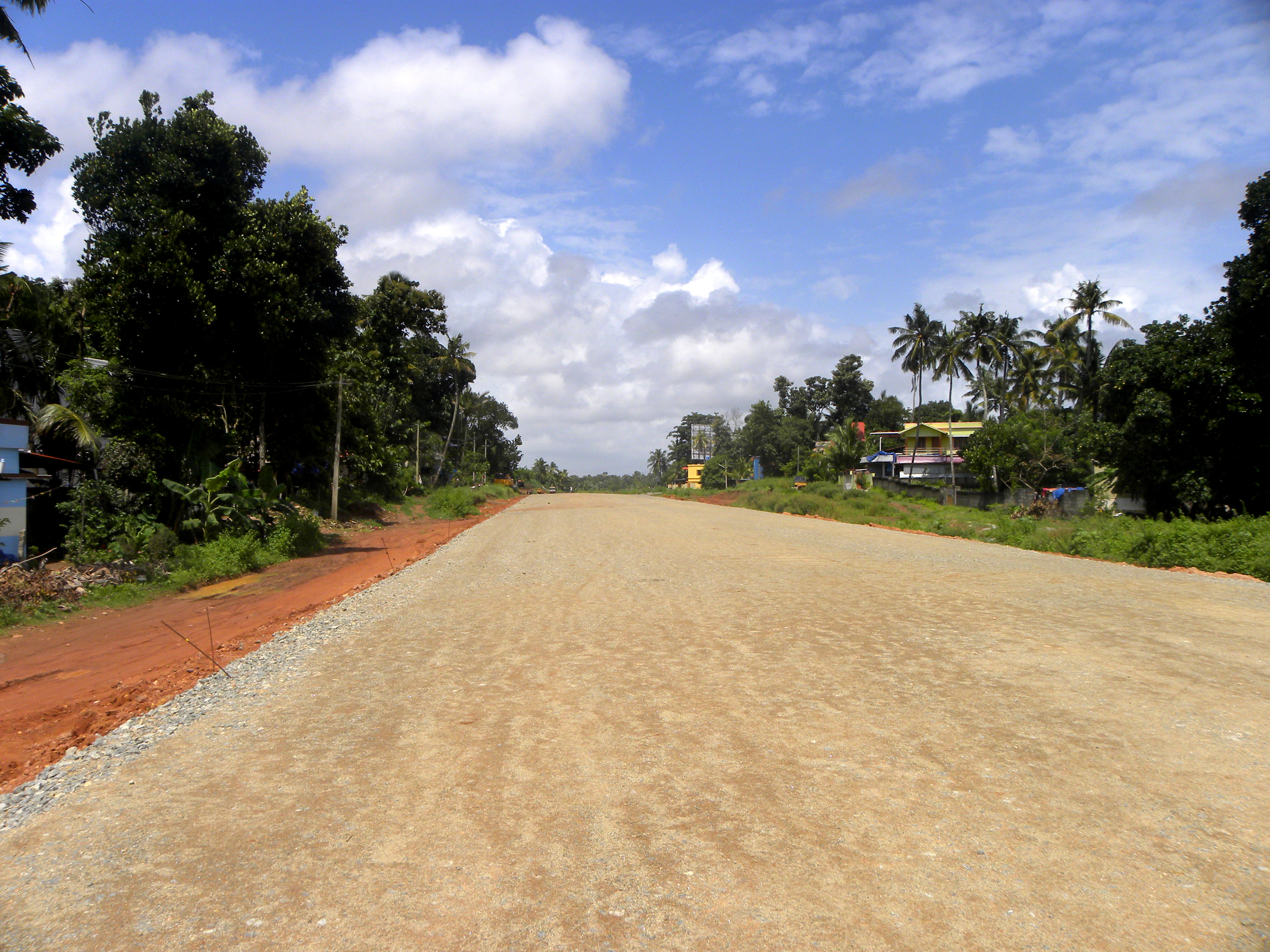
Construction of Kollam Bypass near Thrikkadavoor

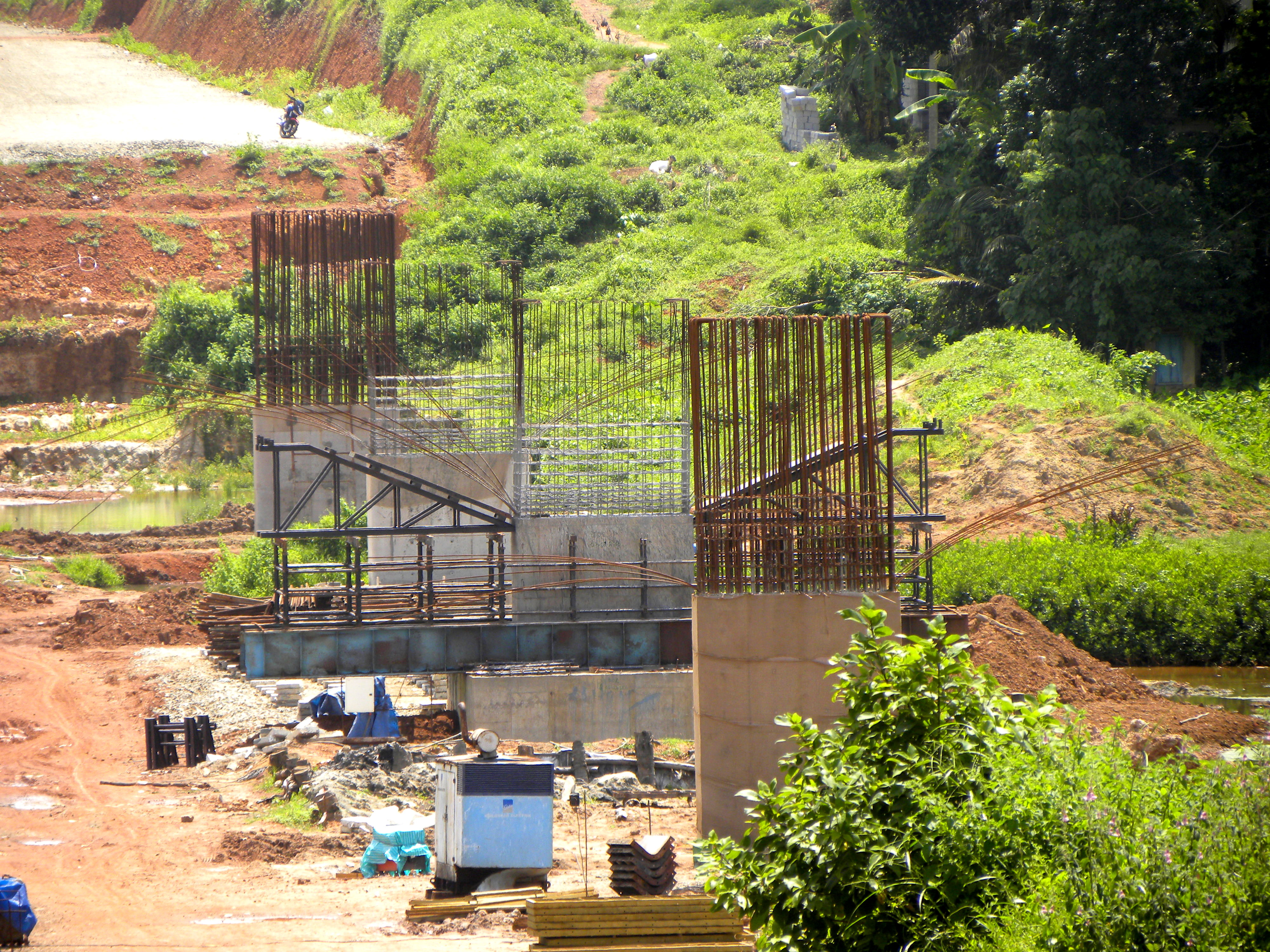
100m long Neeravil bridge under construction

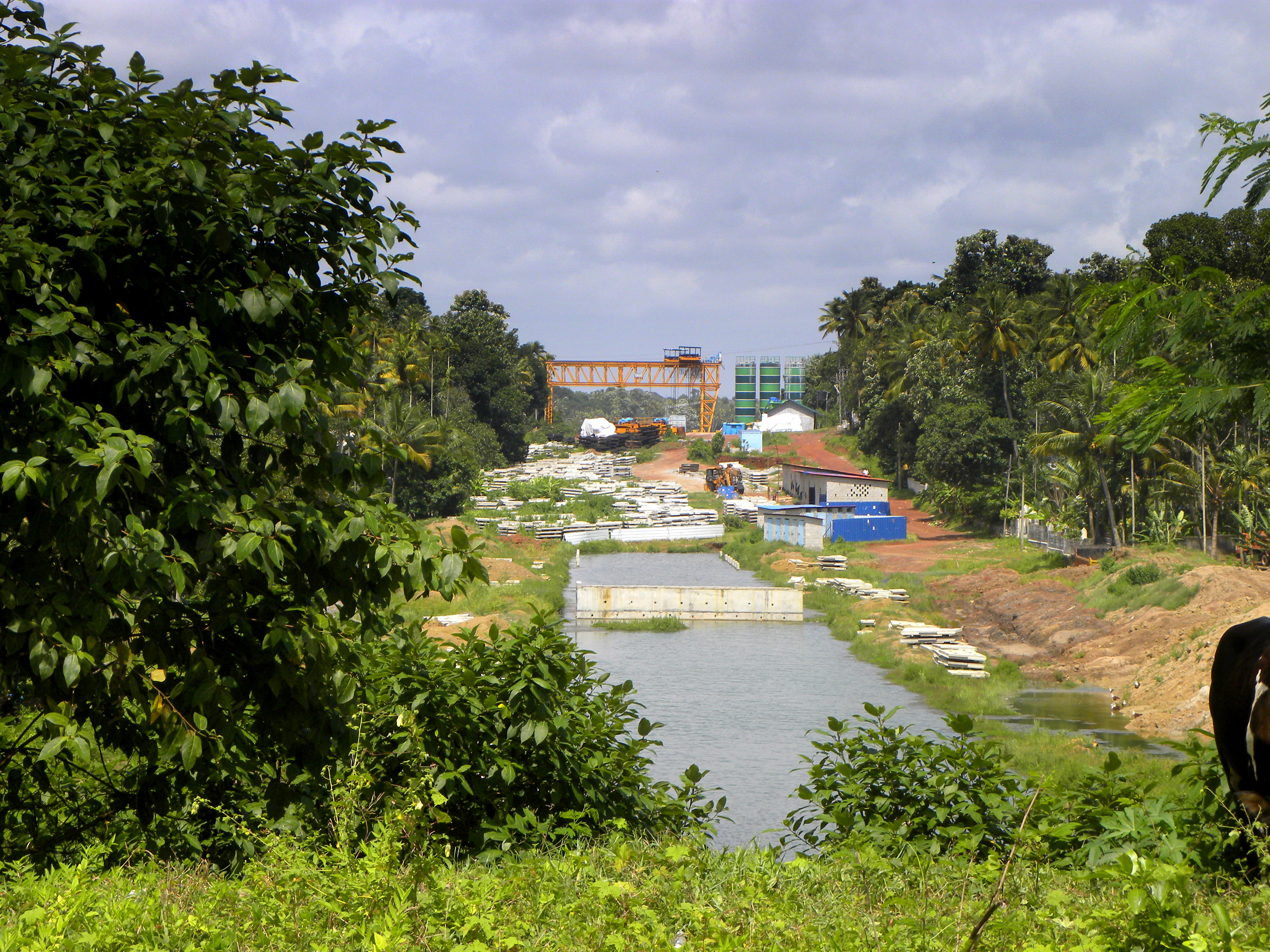
Bypass construction towards Kallumthazham

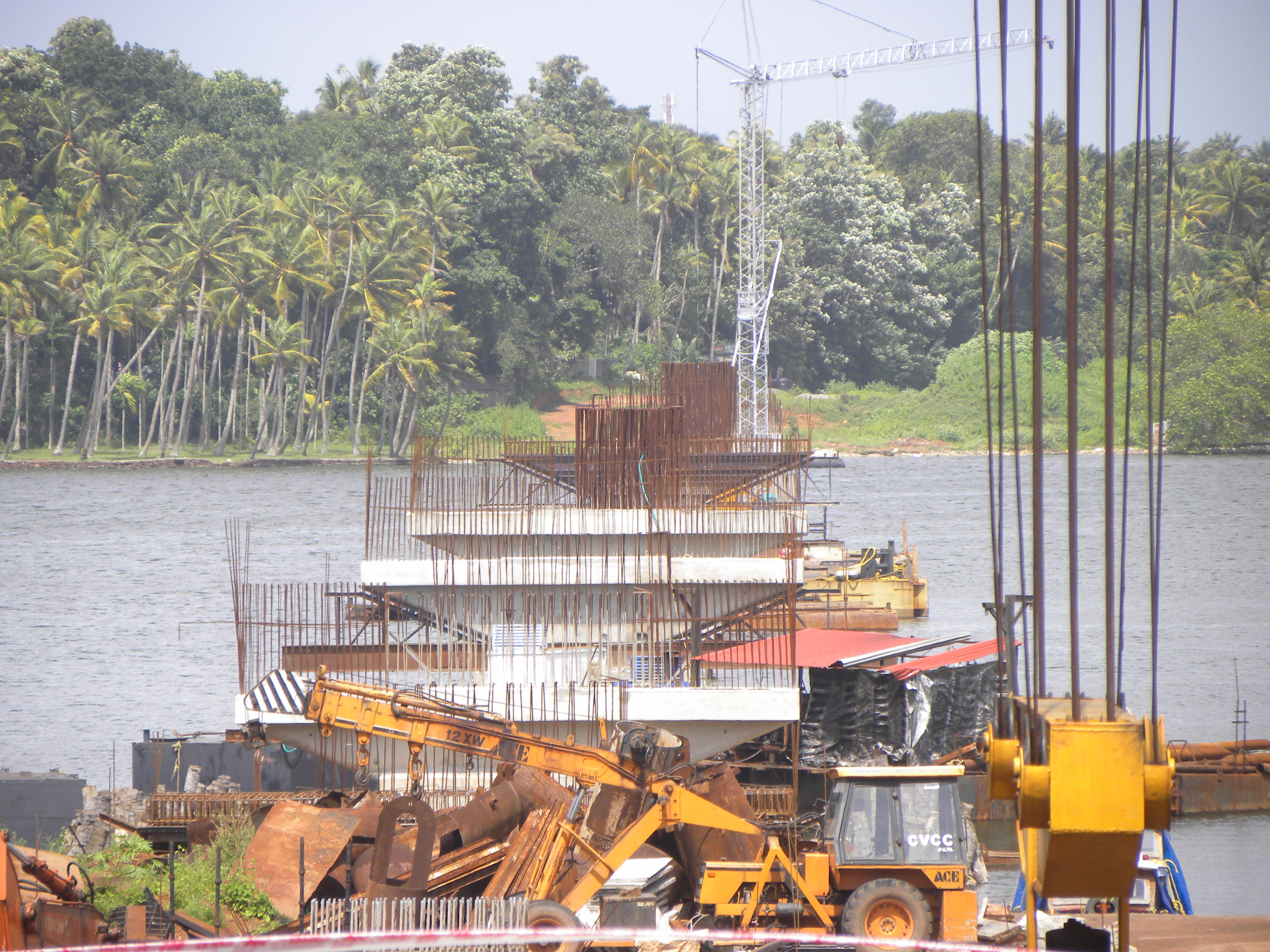
900m long Kandachira bridge under construction

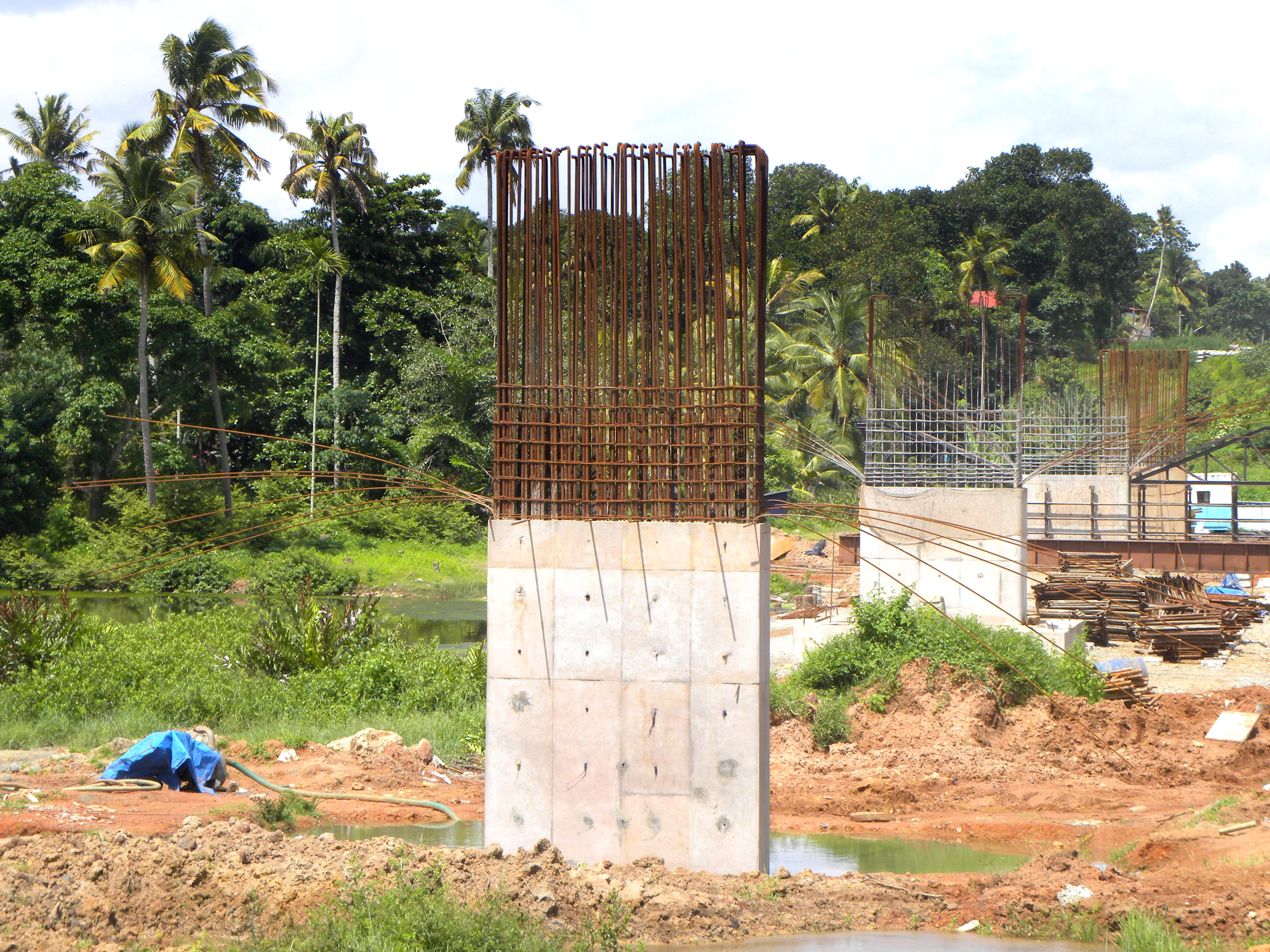
Neeravil bridge

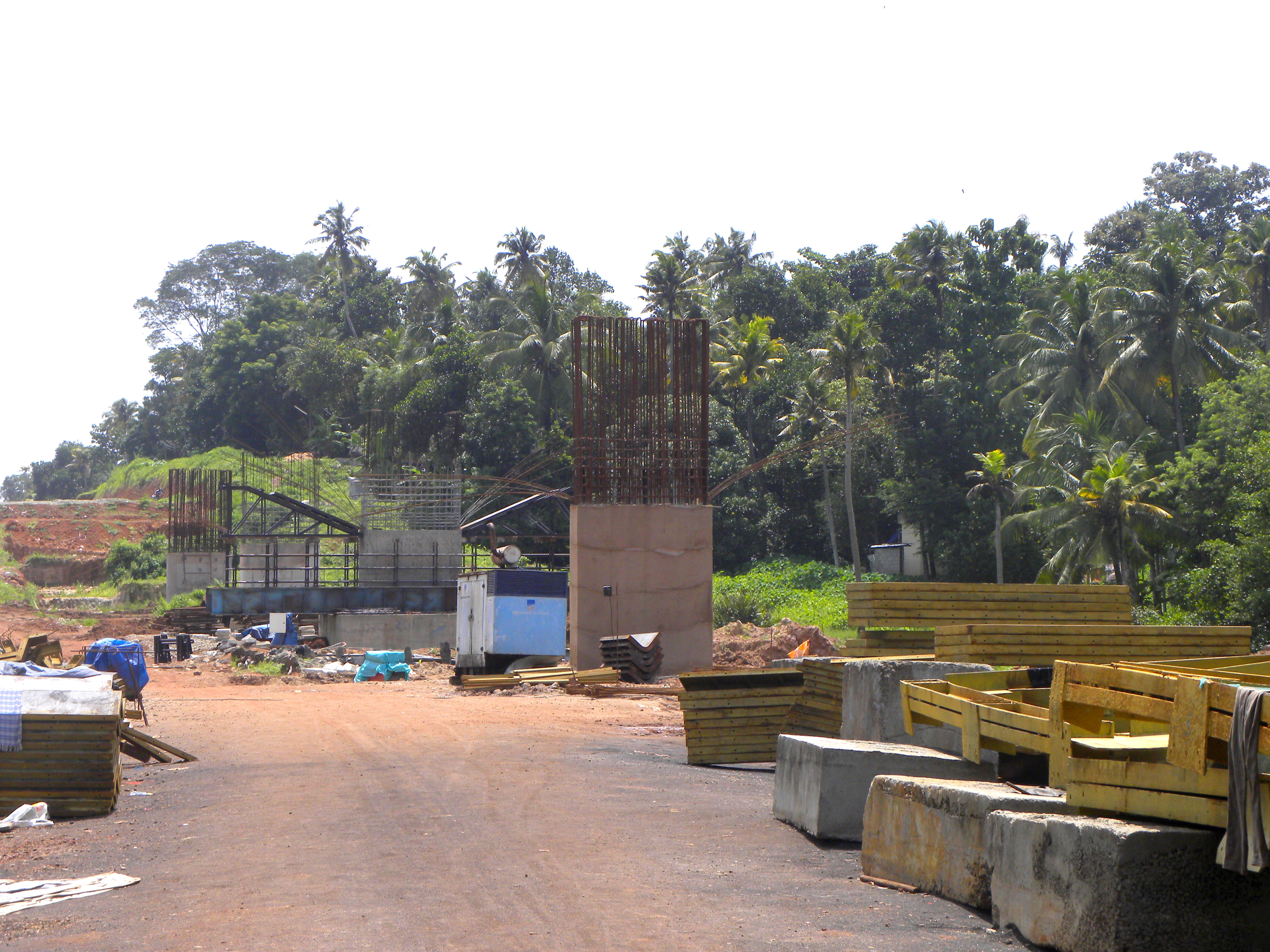
Neeravil bridge

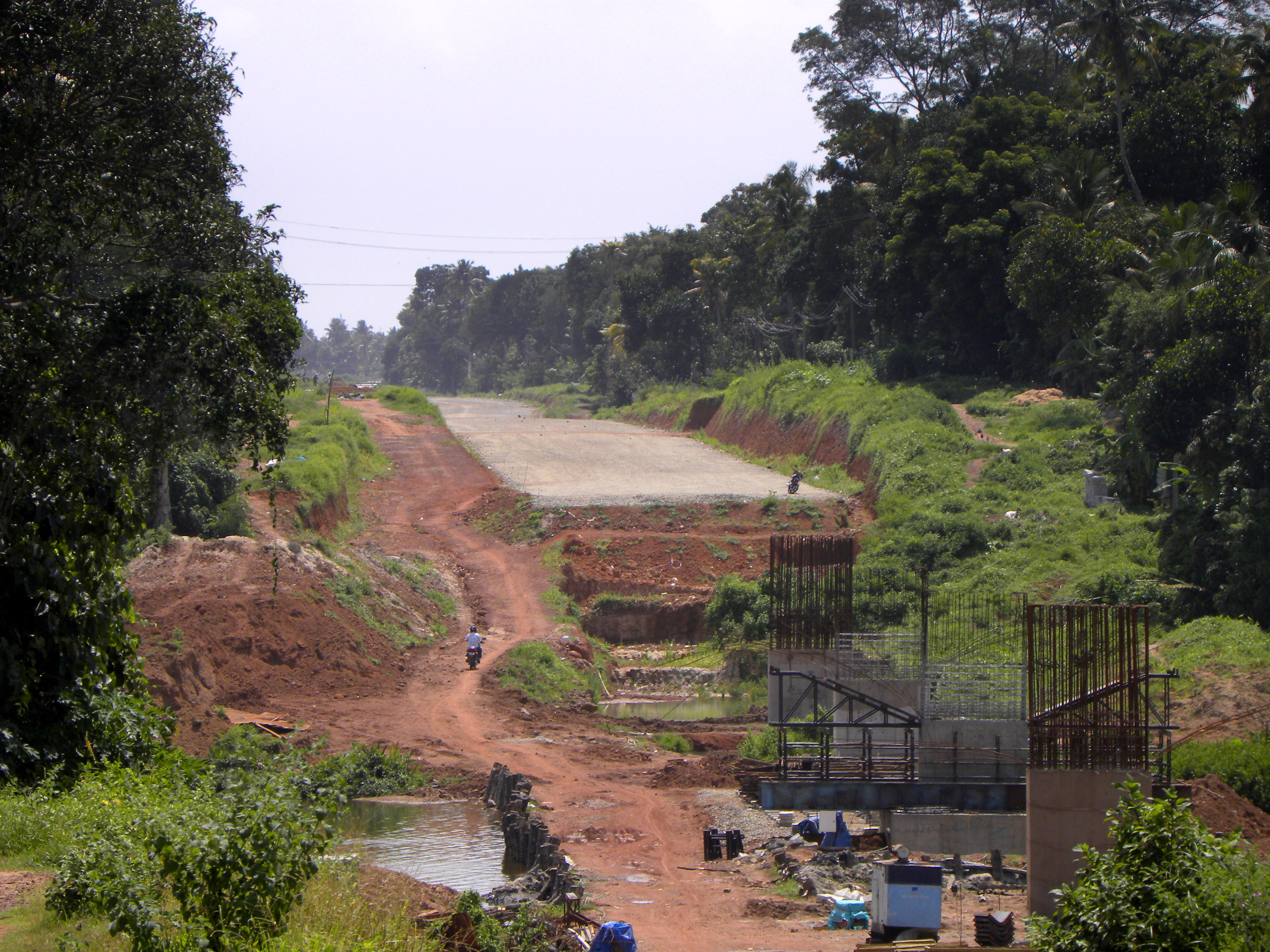
Neeravil bridge

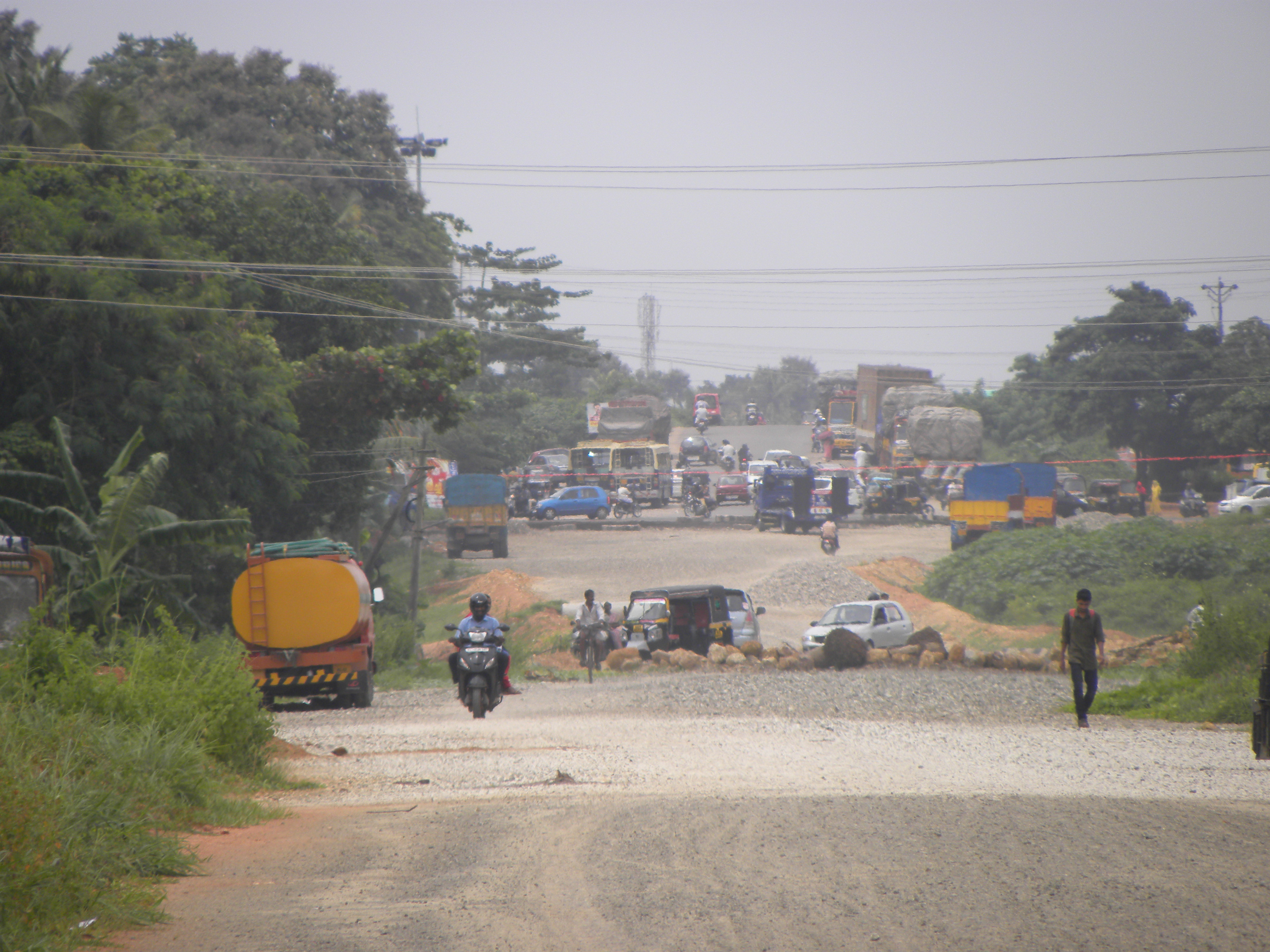
View of Kallumthazham Junction from bypass

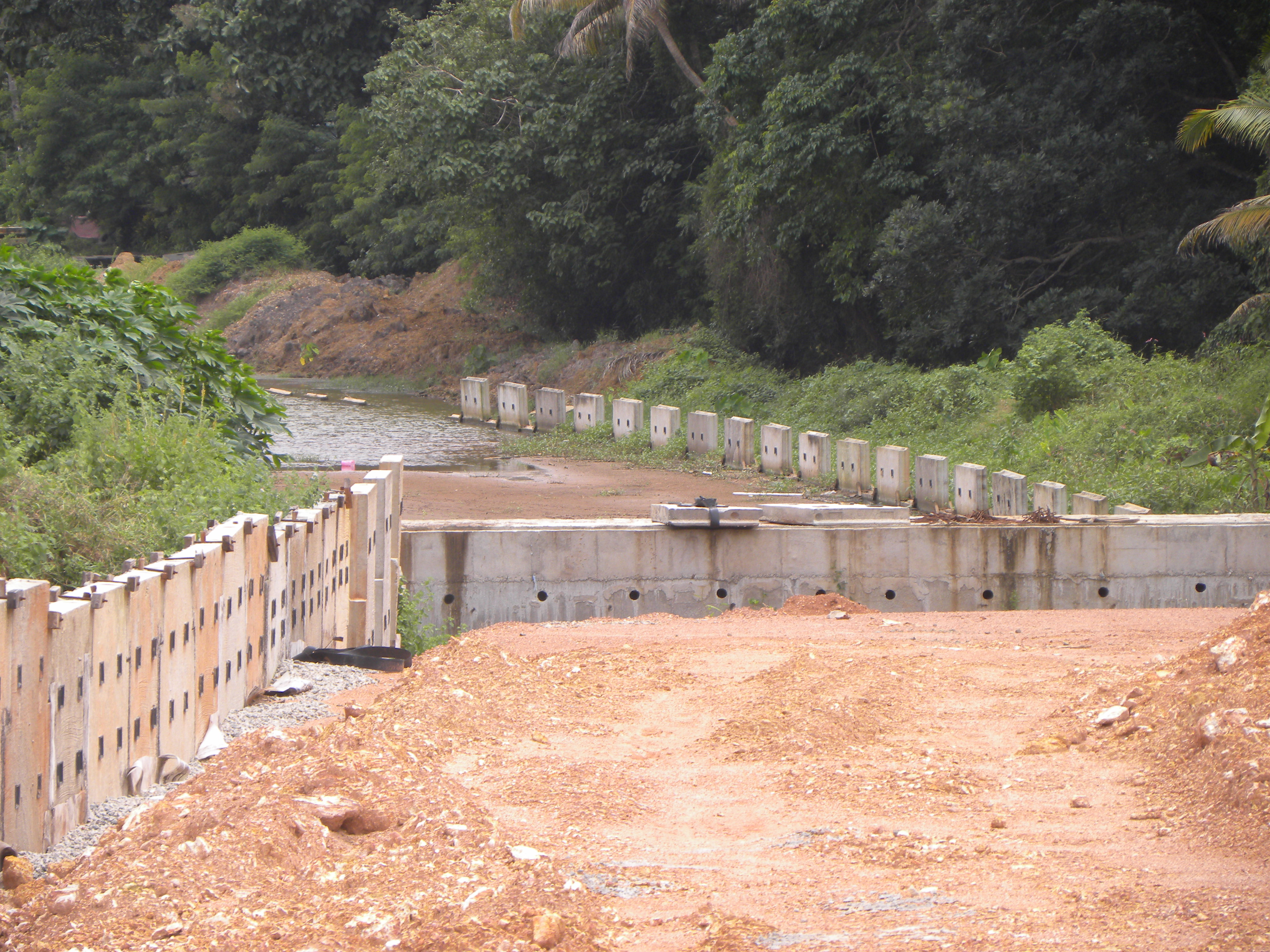
Culvert under construction near Kallumthazham

== See also ==
- NH-66
- NH-744
- NH-183
- Kollam
- Transport in Kollam
- Downtown Kollam
