= Meditrina Hospital =

Meditrina Hospital, Kollam
- Meditrina Group of Hospitals

Geography
- Location: Ayathil, Kollam, Kerala, India
- Coordinates: 8.893118°N 76.633674°E

Organisation
- Care system: Private
- Type: Tertiary referral hospital
- Network: 8 Hospitals

Services
- Emergency department: Yes
- Beds: 175

History
- Founded: 13 December 2014

Links
- Website: Official Website

Meditrina Hospital is a hospital in the city of Kollam, India. It is the first tertiary care hospital in the city, located at Ayathil, and was inaugurated 13 December 2014. Meditrina Group of Hospitals is headquartered at Kollam, mainly aiming to provide bypass and allied cardiac care.

The Meditrina Group has recently raised $6 million (INR 30 crores) from Matrix Partners India.

== Branches ==
- ESIC Heart Centre, Asramam (Kollam, Kerala)
- Panchkula (Haryana)
- Ambala Cantt. (Haryana)
- Faridabad (Haryana)
- Thiruvananthapuram (Kerala)
- Jamshedpur (Jharkhand)
- Chas-Bokaro (Jharkhand)
- Gurugram (Haryana)
- Agroha (Haryana)
- Maldives
- Palakkad (Kerala)
