= Vadakkevila =

Area of Kollam in Kerala, India

- Zone & Neighbourhood
- Location in Kollam, India Vadakkevila (Kerala) Vadakkevila (India)
- Coordinates: 8°52′48″N 76°37′51″E
- Country: India
- City: Kollam
- Zone: Vadakkevila Zonal HQ

Languages
  - Official: Malayalam, English
- Time zone: UTC+5:30 (IST)
- PIN: 691010
- Telephone code: 0474
- Vehicle registration: KL-02
- Nearest city: Kollam (5 km)

Vadakkevila is a village and neighbourhood of Kollam city, in Kollam district. This village is under the governance of Kollam corporation. It is one among the 6 zones of Kollam city. Vadakkevila is 10 km away from Kollam city centre and 17 km away from Paravur town.

Many educational institutions are located in this village. one engineering college namely, Younnis College of Engineering, Travancore Business Academy, a public school affiliated to Central Board of Secondary Education and many primary and upper primary schools.
