= Vattakkayal =

Lake in Kollam district, Kerala, India

Coordinates: 8.918°N 76.549°E

Vattakkayal Lake is located within the Sakthikulangara Gram Panchayat of Kollam district, Kerala, India The name "Vattakayal" translates to "circular lake" and reflects the lake's shape.

The lake itself encompasses an area of approximately 40 acres. Bordering the lake are an additional 100 acres of agricultural fields, bringing the total area associated with Vattakayal Lake to roughly 140 acres.

Geographically, Vattakkayal Lake falls between 8°56' North and 8°53' North latitude and 76°32' East and 76°34' East longitude. The lake occupies a central position within Kollam with respect to the surrounding areas of Neendakara, Kavanad, and Maruthadi.

Historically, the land surrounding Vattakkayal Lake consisted of wetlands used for paddy cultivation. The water body itself was known for its abundance of fish and aquatic life. However, the current land use pattern reflects a shift. The previously vacant marshlands are no longer cultivated, and the water quality has been impacted by the influx of domestic waste, drainage channels, and industrial effluents. This has led to the proliferation of invasive aquatic plants like water hyacinth.
