= Transport in Kollam =

Transport in Kollam includes various modes of road, rail and water transportation in the city and its suburbs. State-owned Kerala State Road Transport Corporation buses, private buses, Indian Railways, state-owned Kerala State Water Transport Department boats & ferry, taxis and auto rickshaws are serving the city of Kollam. The city had a strong commercial reputation since the days of the Phoenicians and Romans. Ibn Battuta mentioned Kollam Port as one of the five Indian ports he had seen during the course of his twenty-four year travels.

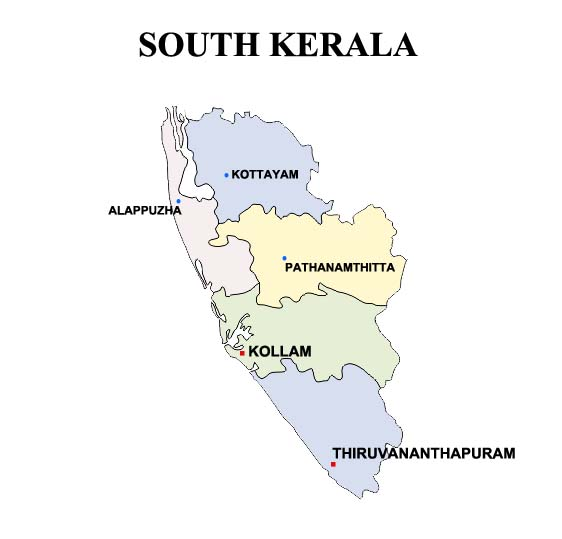
Map of South Kerala

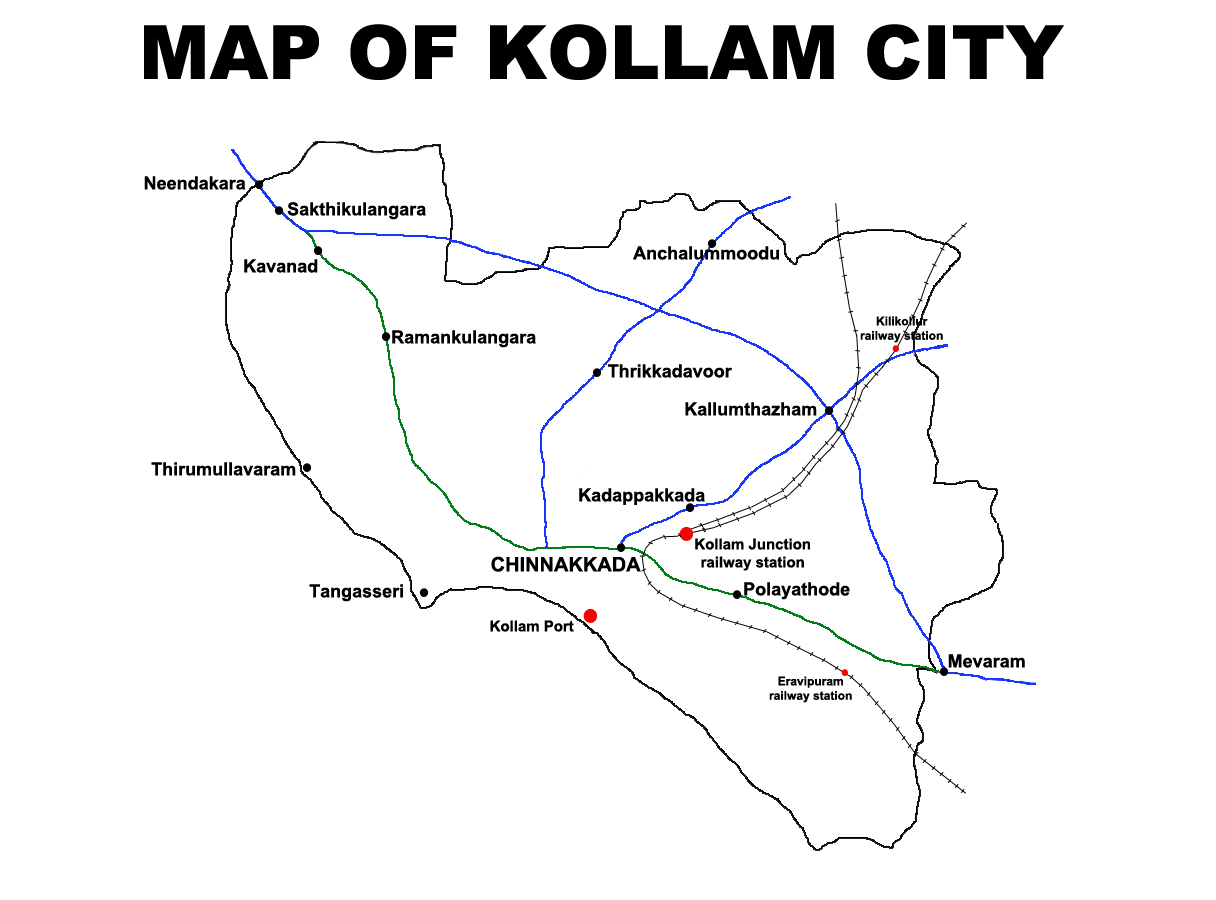
Map of Kollam City

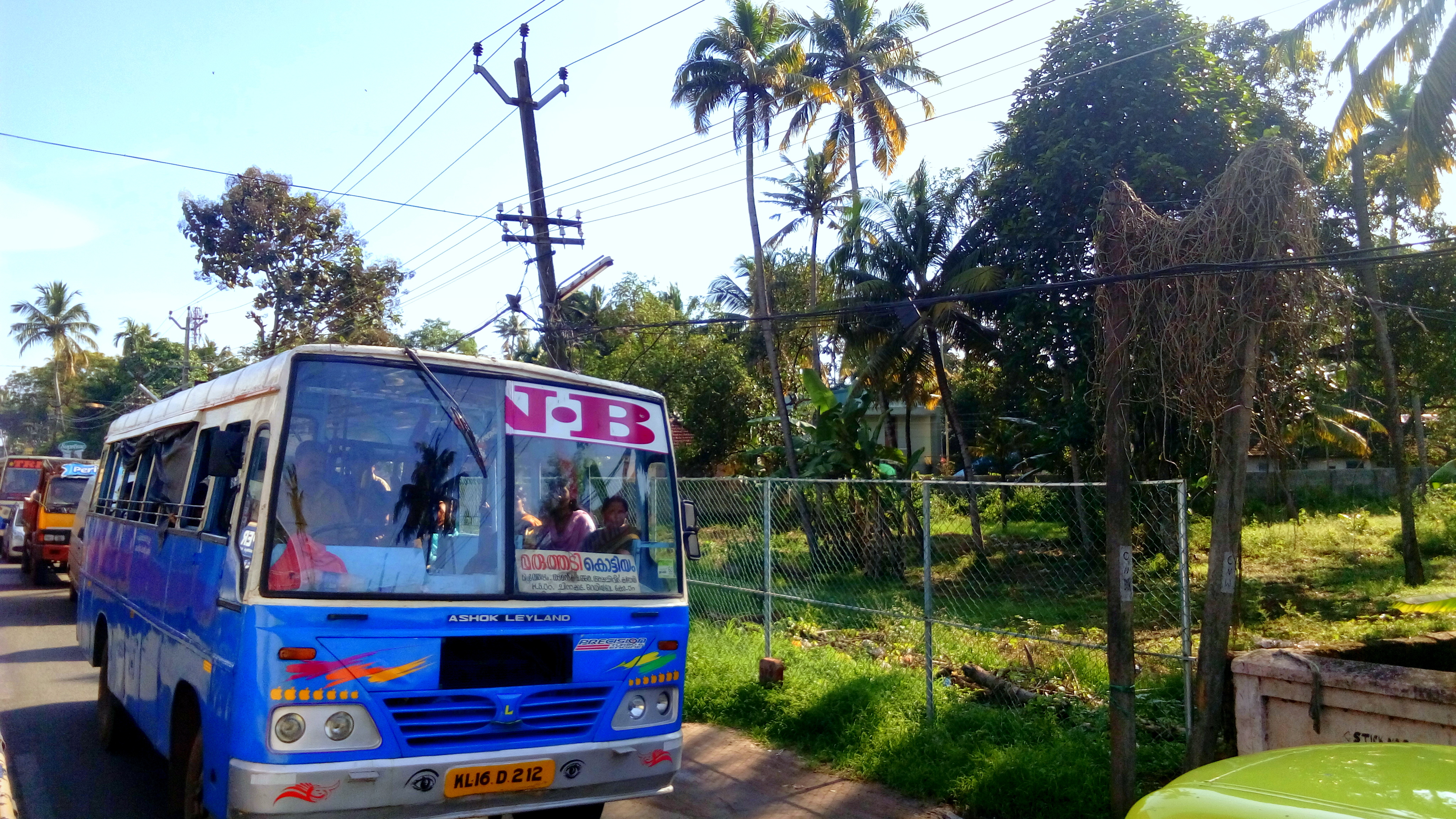
A Kollam city bus at Ramankulangara. The city services of Kollam were blue in colour. Now city buses follow Green colour as per the new bus colour code of Kerala.

Kollam is known as the Cashew capital of the world. 90% of India's export quality Cashew Kernels are prepared from Kollam. It is the largest processed cashew exporter in the world. It is the headquarters of the Kollam District. The city of Kollam is home to the largest number of Bullet owners in India. As per the survey done by Royal Enfield in 2009, more than 60,000 bullet owners are there in Kollam city and nearly a lakh across the district. The enfield dealers in the city sells an average of 850 units every month.

== History ==
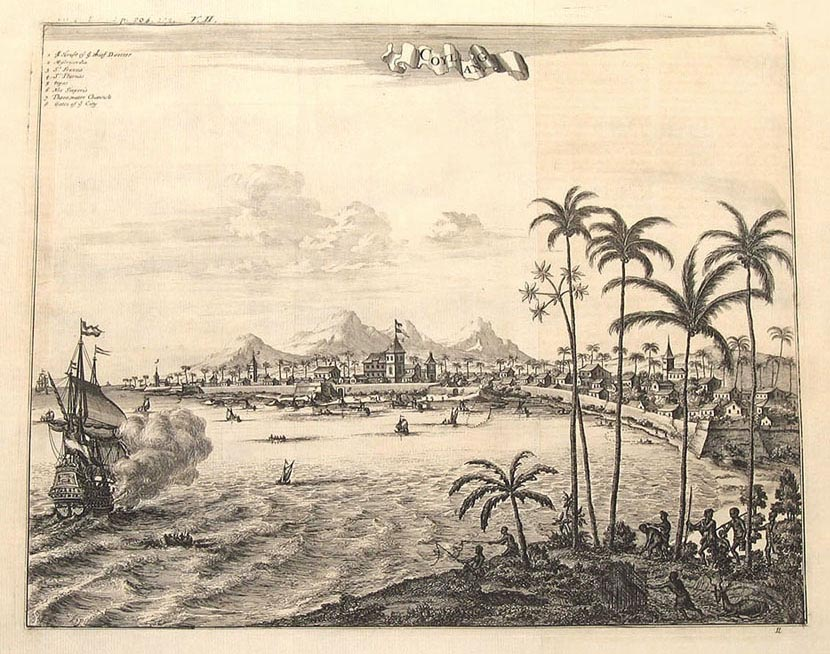
Kollam Port during 1745

City of Kollam(Quilon) was known as the commercial capital of the Venad region (comprising Thiruvananthapuram and Kollam districts). Kollam Seaport (now known as Kollam Port) was founded by Mar Abo at Thangasseri in 825. Kollam's transportation have that much of historic background.

=== Transportation in the past ===
Kollam Airport was the first aerodrome in the present day state of Kerala. During the 1920s, there were no other civil aerodromes in the kingdoms of Cochin, Travancore and the Malabar District at the time of the British ruled Madras Presidency. The airport stopped its operations when an accident involving a training aircraft at the boundary of the aerodrome, resulted in the death of the pilot and the trainee.

Kollam was the first city in South Kerala that got a rail connectivity. The first idea of a rail link from Madras to Quilon, the trading capital of the erstwhile Travancore Kingdom was conceived in 1873. Kollam–Sengottai railway line is the second railway line to come to the present day state of Kerala, the first in the native kingdom of Travancore. After a survey in 1888, work started in 1900 and was completed by 1902. The first goods train travelled on this route in 1902, while the first passenger train began its run in 1904. Before the arrival of rail networks in Trivandrum, Kings of old Travancore had used Kollam Junction railway station and Kollam Airport for their transportation needs. Kollam was the former capital of Venad Kingdom. The Madras-Quilon line was extended to the capital of the Princely State of Travancore on 4 January 1918.

==== Timeline of rail transportation in Kollam ====
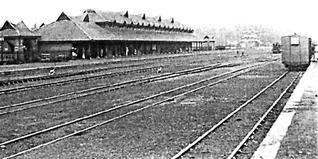
Kollam Junction railway station in 1905

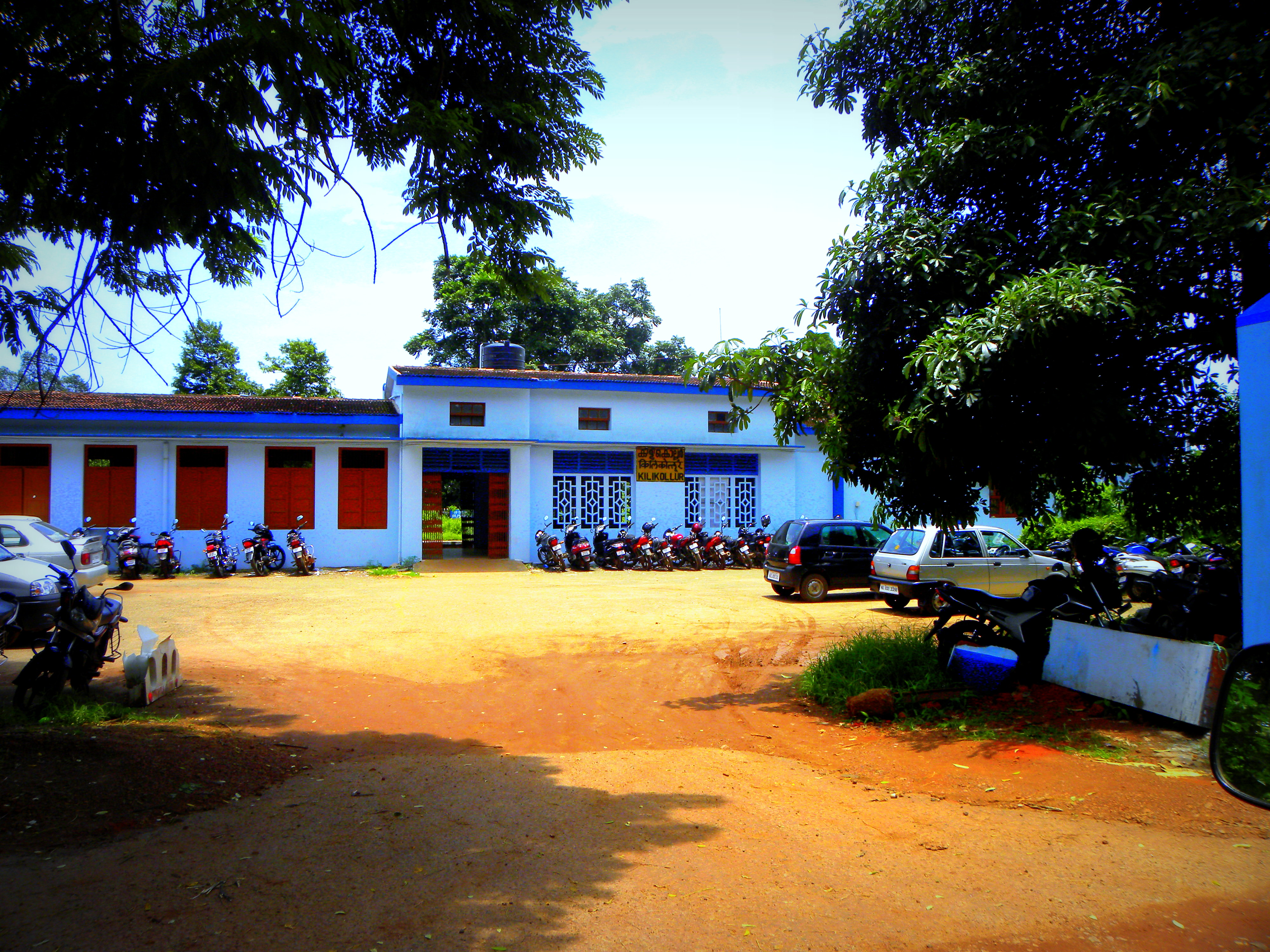
Kilikollur railway station on Kollam–Sengottai rail line

- 1899 - Survey for Quilon-Madras rail link completed
- 1900 - Works for Kollam–Sengottai Meter gauge railway line started to connect the City of Quilon with Madras
- 1902 - Kollam–Sengottai Railway line works completed
- 1904 - On 1 June, Kollam-Punalur line was opened
- 1904 - On 26 November, Passenger train service started through Kollam–Sengottai Railway line
- 1918 - On 4 January, The Meter gauge line till Kollam was extended up to Chala in Thiruvananthapuram
- 1931 - Kollam-Thiruvananthapuram Meter gauge line extended till Thiruvananthapuram Central
- 1952 - On 24 December, works for Kochi-Kollam rail line works inaugurated by Jawaharlal Nehru, the then Prime Minister of India.
- 1956 - Kottayam-Kollam Meter gauge line works started
- 1958 - On 6 January, Kottayam-Kollam line commissioned
- 1976 - Kollam-Thiruvananthapuram Meter gauge line converted to broad gauge and commissioned
- 1998 - Gauge conversion of Kollam–Sengottai Railway line officially started
- 2001 - Kollam-Thiruvananthapuram broad gauge line electrified
- 2007 - On 1 May, Rail services on Kollam-Punalur section withdrawn
- 2010 - On 10 May, Kollam-Punalur broad gauge section thrown open for services
- 2012 - On 19 March, MEMU services on Kollam-Ernakulam route flagged off
- 2012 - On 31 November, A new MEMU service started on Kollam-Kanyakumari route
- 2013 - On 1 December, Kollam MEMU Shed formally inaugurated and Maintenance Works started
- 2018 - On 31 March, the entire Kollam–Sengottai line thrown open for passenger train services. The first passenger train on the stretch was Tambaram-Kollam-Tambaram special train service(06027/28) and is completed the service by earning Rs 3.15 lakh as passenger ticket collection from its 879 passengers against a capacity of 712.

== Road Transportation ==
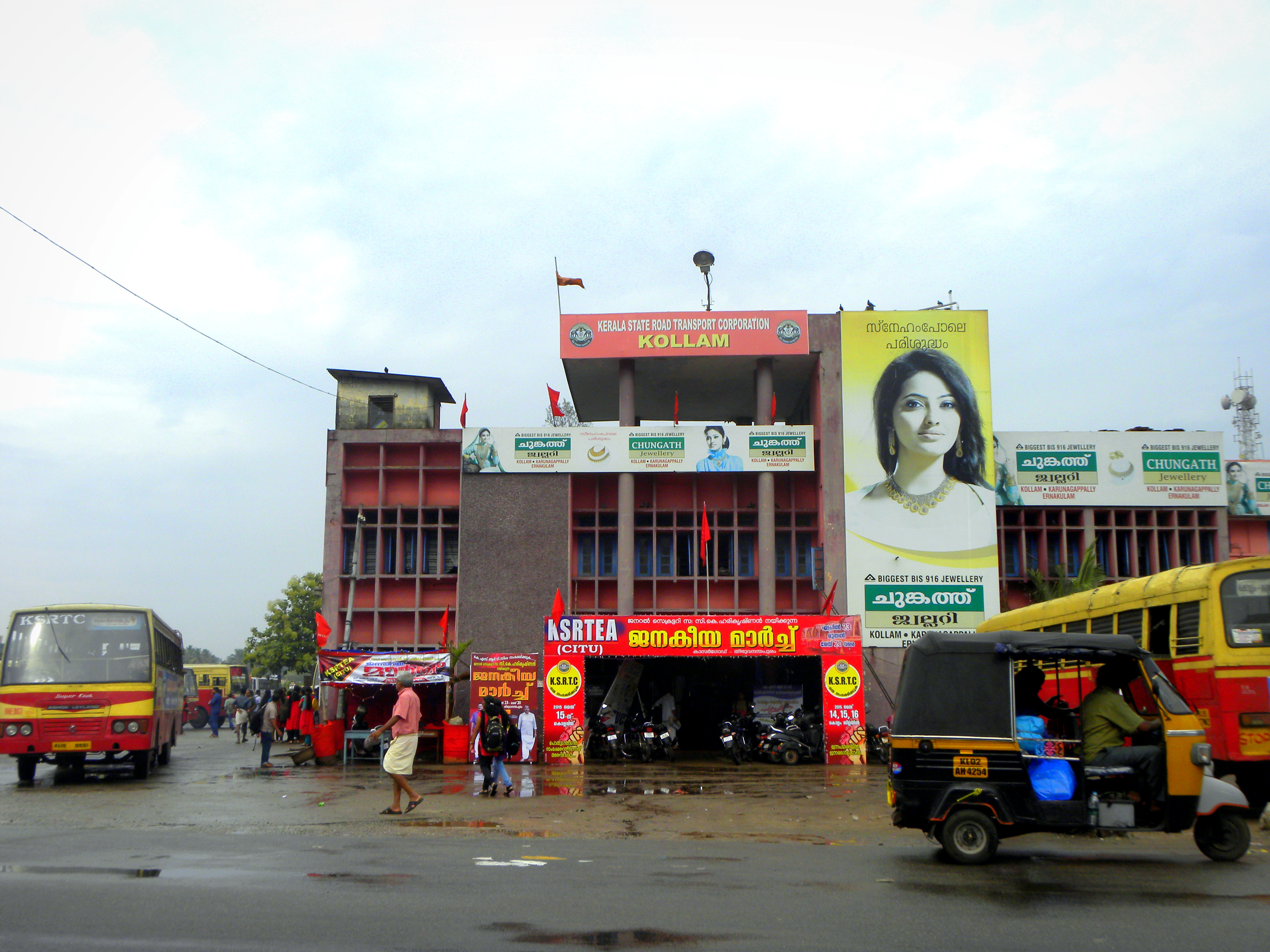
Kollam KSRTC Bus Station

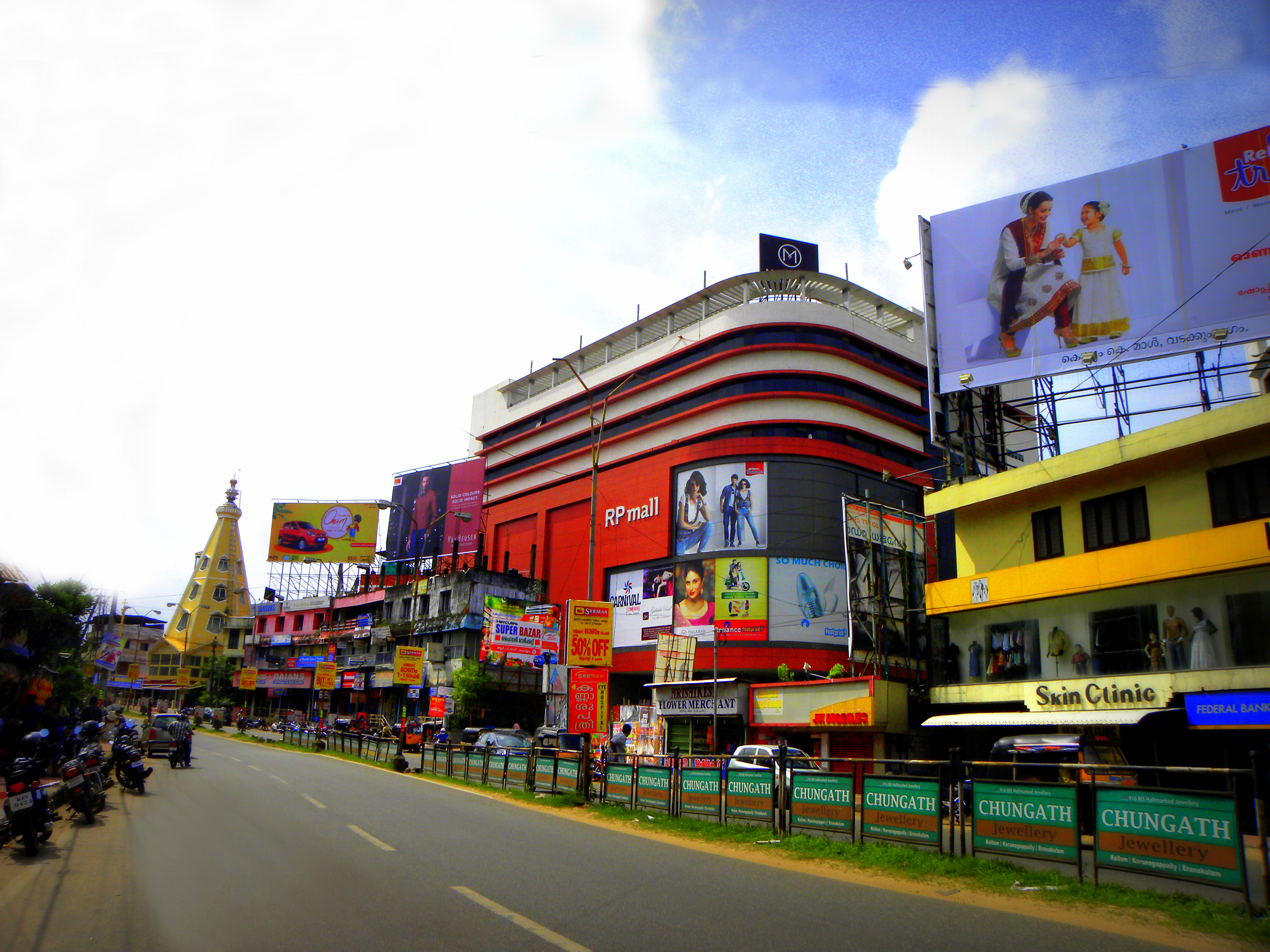
View of National Highway-66 near Downtown Kollam

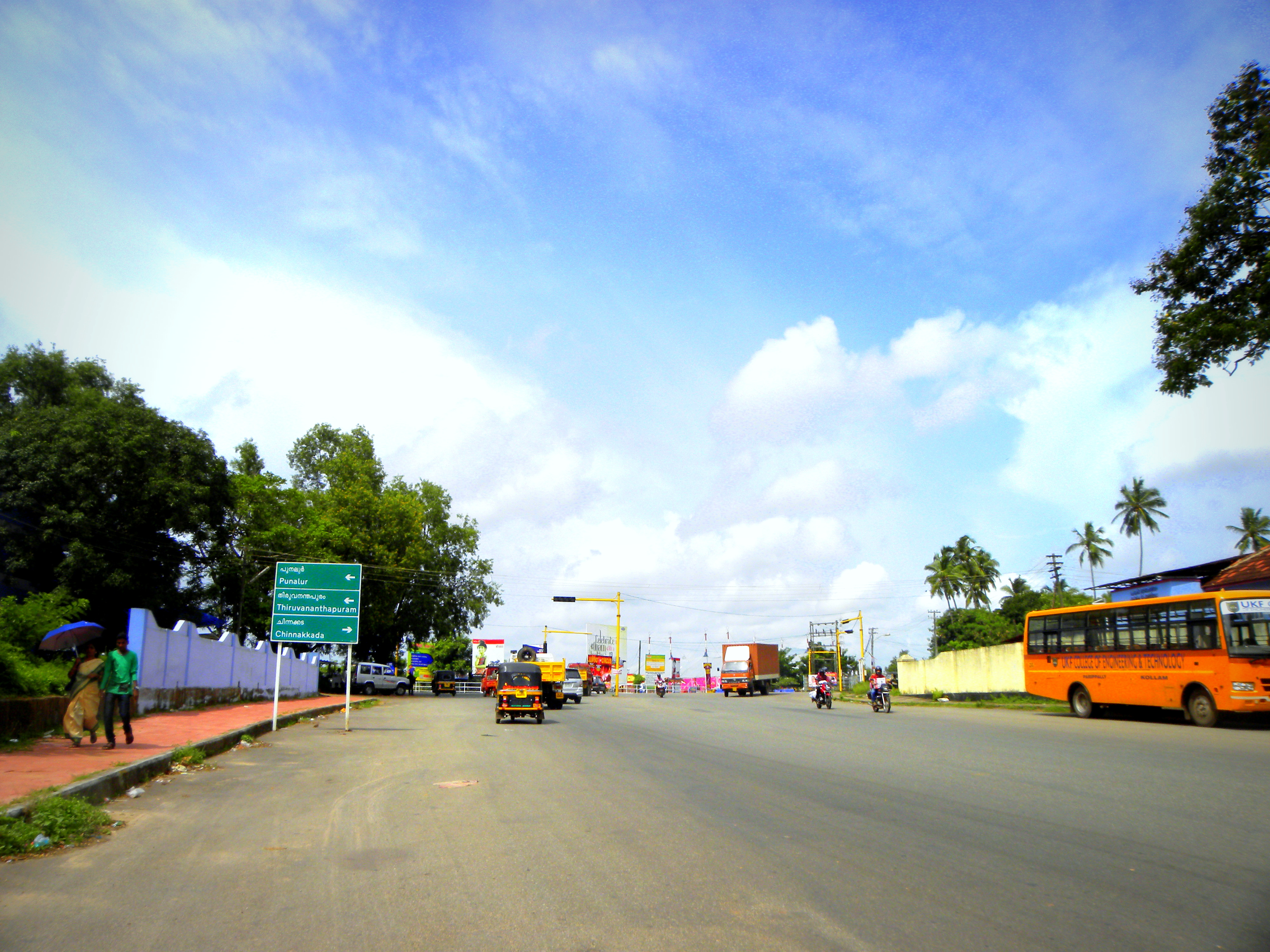
Asramam Link Road near Kollam KSRTC Bus Station

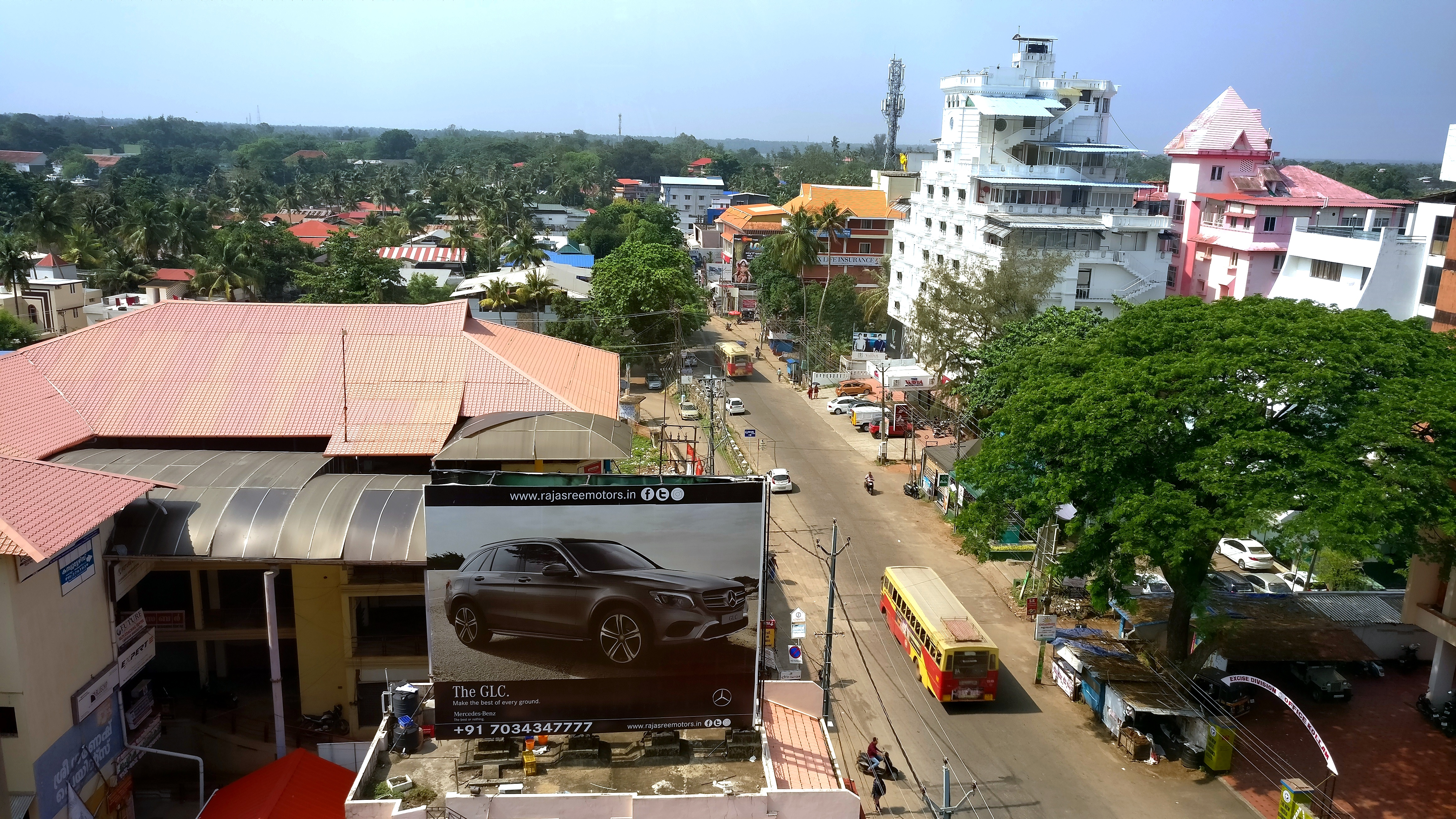
Aerial view of Residency Road in Chinnakada

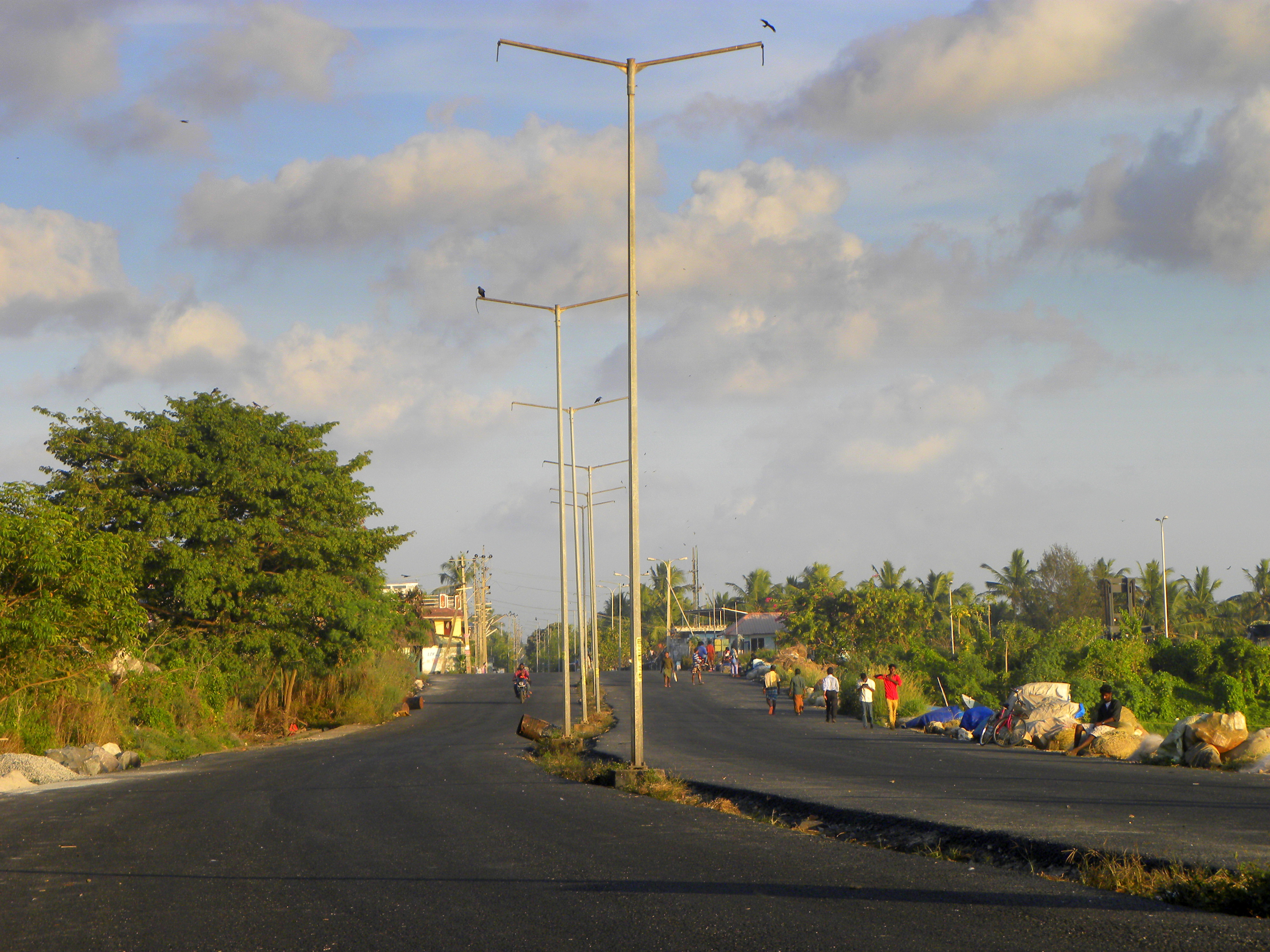
Port Road near Tangasseri

The city and metropolitan area are served by major arterial roads that run either in an east-west or north-south direction. The intra-city transportation is mainly carried out by private buses whereas the inter-city services are carried out by KSRTC. Kollam is one among the five KSRTC zones in Kerala. The private city bus services in Kollam were blue in colour. Now buses in Kollam follows newly introduced colour code system like rest of Kerala and hence city buses are green and other moffusil buses are blue. As per the reports, there are 681 buses plying through the roads in Kollam district. There is only one Regional Transport Office(RTO) in the city so far which is Kollam RTO(KL-02). But there are 6 Sub-Regional Transport Offices in the district of Kollam: Karunagappally (KL-23), Kottarakkara (KL-24), Punalur (KL-25), Kunnathur (KL-61), Chadayamangalam (KL-81), Pathanapuram (KL-82).

=== Bus stations ===
There are two major bus stations and one bus terminal in the city.

- City bus station, Andamukkam
- KSRTC bus station, Cutchery
- Bus terminal, Tangasseri

=== City Buses of Kollam ===
There is no dedicated Urban Metro Transport company or corporation for Kollam. KSRTC's urban transport wing KURTC does very few AC buses to Punalur, Trivandrum and Kochi. Other wise the scene is completely dominated by green coloured private buses. The system suffers badly due to poor condition of buses, lack of speed, adequate passenger amenities or information system, lack of new routes on by-routes, lack of route numbering and rude behaviour of staff. There was an attempt to bring in number system a decade back which went in vain due to poor implementation and lack of co-operation. There is also lack of proper waiting sheds for passengers in bus stops of Kollam.

Major city bus routes are,

- Chavara - Elampalloor (near Kundara)
- Chavara - Kottiyam
- Chavara - Aasraamam/Uliyakovil
- Kottiyam - Cutchery
- Eravipuram - Thankassery
- Perumon - Chinnakkada
- Prakkulam - Chinnakkada
- Ashtamudi - Perumpuzha (near Kundara)
- Mayyanad - Cutchery (via Koottikada)
- Kottiyam - Mevaram - Kallumthaazham - Karicode (by pass route)
- Kottiyam - Modeenmukku - Karicode - Chavara Thekkumbhagom

City buses also runs to Maruthady, Maammoottilkadavu, Thirumullavaram, Kovilthottam, Mangadu, Kuppana, Panayam, Kannanalloor etc. There is a logical need to extent the city buses ending in Elampalloor to Kundara Technopark, Kuzhimathikadu, Nallila (where there is a multiplex), Cheerankavu etc to bring in Kundara town also effectively integrated with the Kollam city bus network and to boost connectivity to outskirts. Lack of enough service on by-routes between Three main roads to Kollam from Kundara and two roads from Kottiyam has led to increase of number of two wheeler traffic in Kollam city in an unhealthy manner.

=== Roads ===
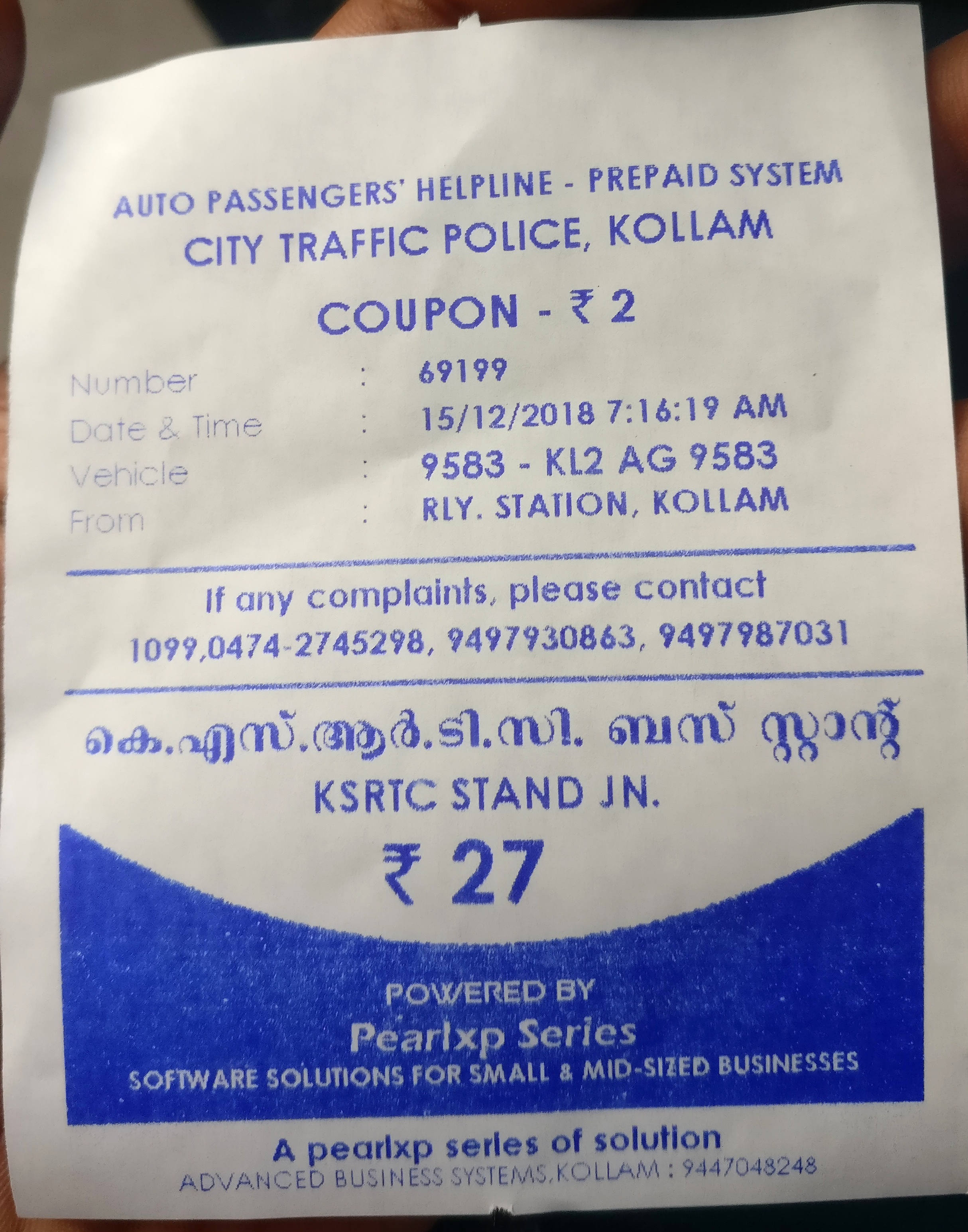
Receipt for prepaid autorickshaw ride in Kollam city

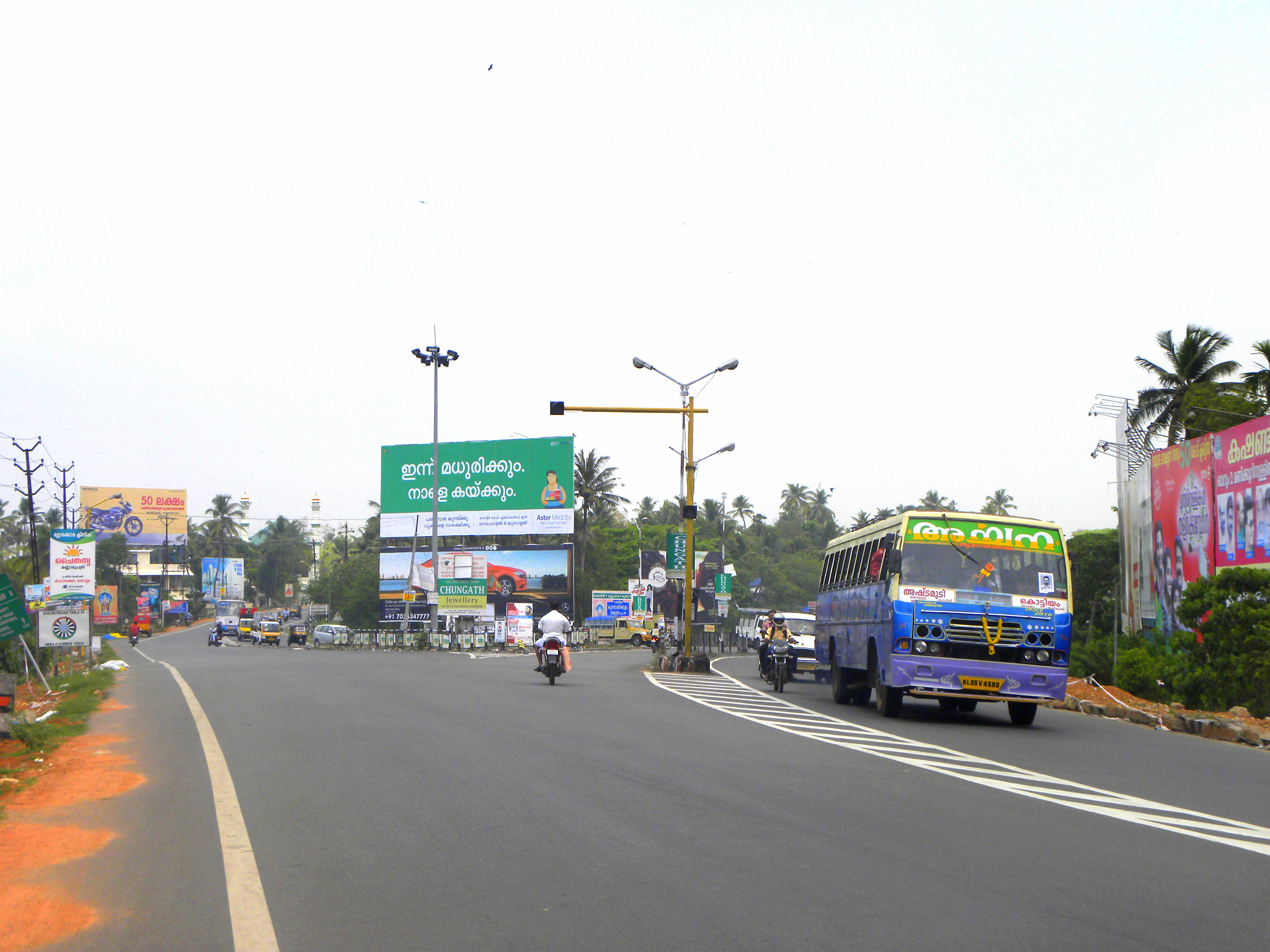
Mevaram Junction in Kollam Bypass

Kollam Metropolitan Area is a meeting point of 4 important National Highways of India. They are,

- National Highway-66 - Thiruvananthapuram to Panvel
  (via Mevaram, Ayathil, Kallumthazham, Kadavoor, Kavanad and Neendakara)
- National Highway-183 - Kollam to Theni (via Chengannur, Kottayam)
- National Highway-744 - Kollam to Tirumangalam (via Punalur, Tenkasi)
- National Highway-183A - TItanium Jn. to Vandiperiyar (via Adoor, Pathanamthitta)

==== Major neighbourhoods and suburbs connected with NH-66 ====
Mevaram → Palathara → Ayathil → Kallumthazham → Kadavoor → Kureepuzha → Aravila → Kavanad → Aaltharamoodu → Capithans → Sakthikulangara → Neendakara

==== Major neighbourhoods and suburbs connected with NH-744 ====
Chinnakada → Kadappakada → Randamkutty → Koickal → Kallumthazham → Moonnamkutty → Karicode → Kilikollur → Chandanathoppe → Keralapuram → Elamballoor → Kundara

==== Major neighbourhoods and suburbs connected with NH 183 ====
Thevally → Kadavoor → Anchalumoodu → Perinad

In addition to that, some major roads like Asramam Link Road, Kollam-Paravur Coastal Road, Residency Road, Kollam Port Road, QAC Road, Kollam-Kulathupuzha road etc. are also connecting Kollam with other major cities, suburbs and towns in the state.

==== Kollam Bypass ====
Kollam Bypass is a road on NH 66 that bypasses CBD of Kollam City. The 13.141 km long bypass starts at Kavanad in the north to Mevaram in the south, via Aravila, Kadavoor, Kallumthazham and Ayathil. The Government of Kerala proposed the bypass in 1972 and thrown open to public in 2019. The bypass touches 3 major National Highways passing through the state.

== Rail Transportation ==
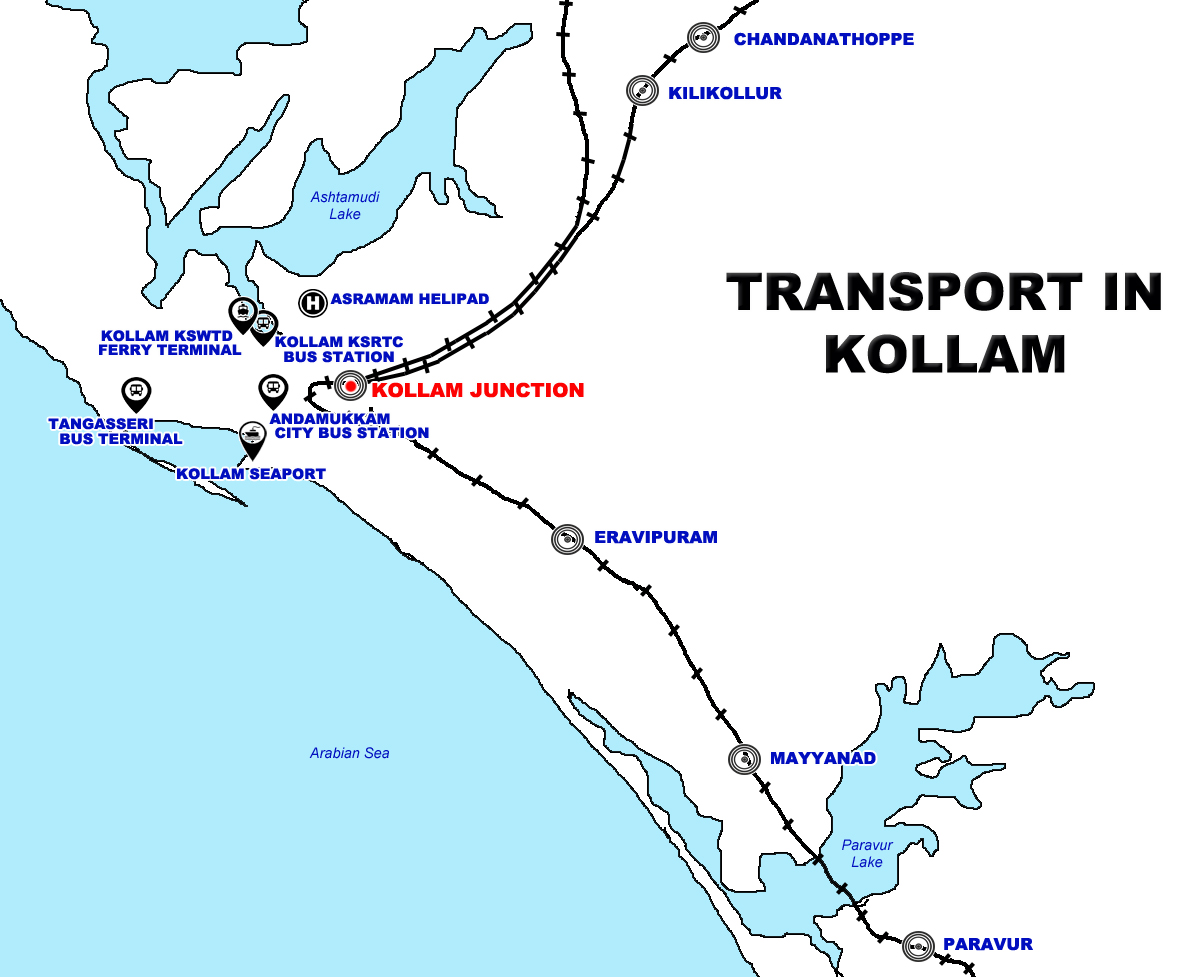
Railway stations in Kollam

Kollam Junction railway station is the major rail head of the city. It is the second largest and fourth busiest railway station in the state. World's second longest railway platform, which is more than 1 km long, is situated at this railway station. In a single stretch the total length is 1,180 m, which is second in the world. The station holds a MEMU Shed to manage short commuter rail services connecting the city with Ernakulam, Thiruvananthapuram, Alappuzha, Kottayam, Nagercoil and Kanniyakumari. The city is served by 4 railway stations. They are,

- Kollam Junction railway station
- Eravipuram railway station
- Kilikollur railway station
- Chandanathoppe railway station

=== Railway stations in Kollam Metropolitan Area ===
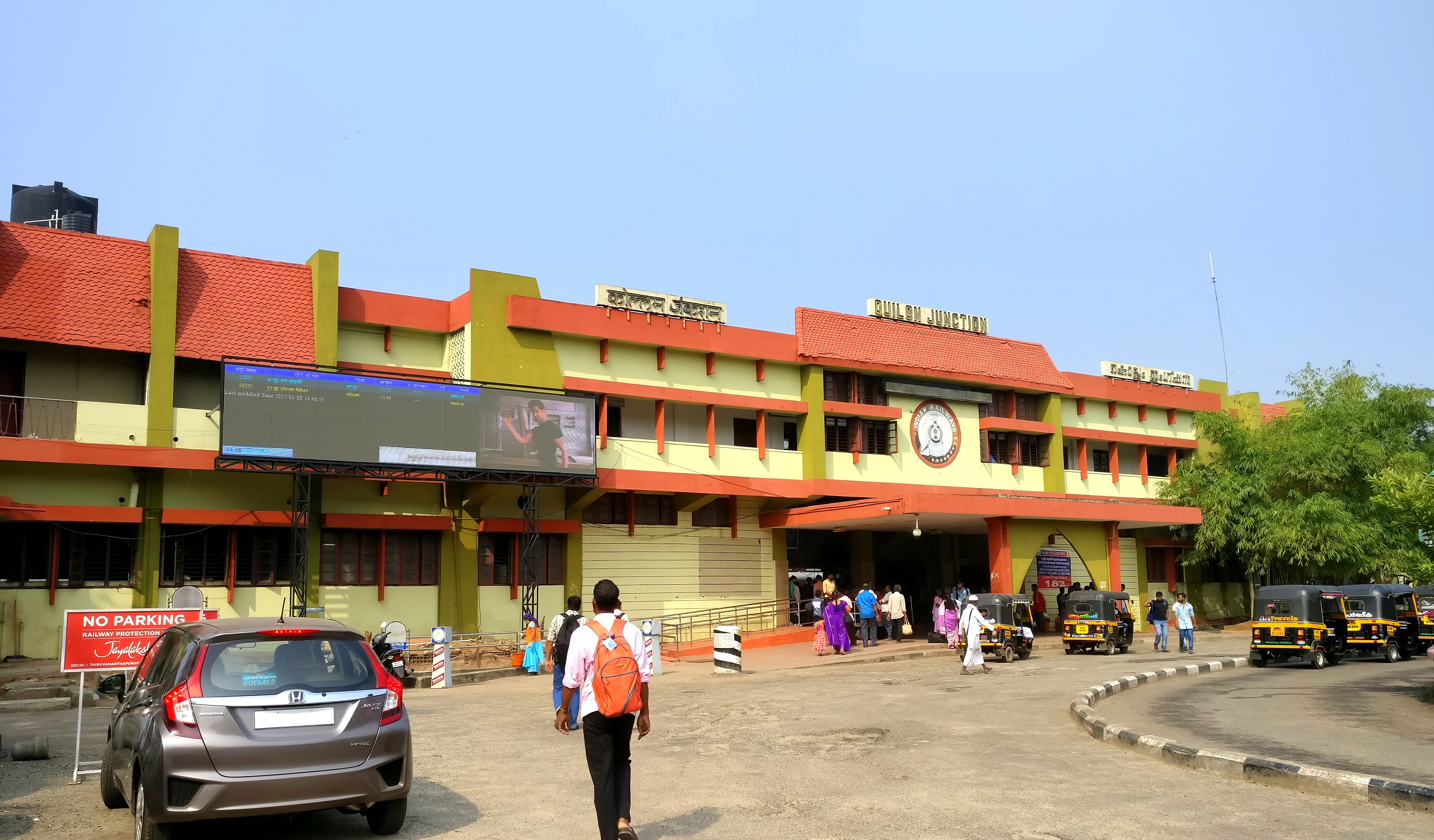
Terminal-1 of Kollam Junction railway station

Kollam Metropolitan Area is served by the following 10 railway stations.

- Kollam Junction railway station
- Eravipuram railway station
- Mayyanad railway station
- Paravur railway station
- Perinad railway station
- Karunagappalli railway station
- Ochira railway station
- Kilikollur railway station
- Chandanathoppe railway station
- Kundara railway station

=== Suburban Rail ===
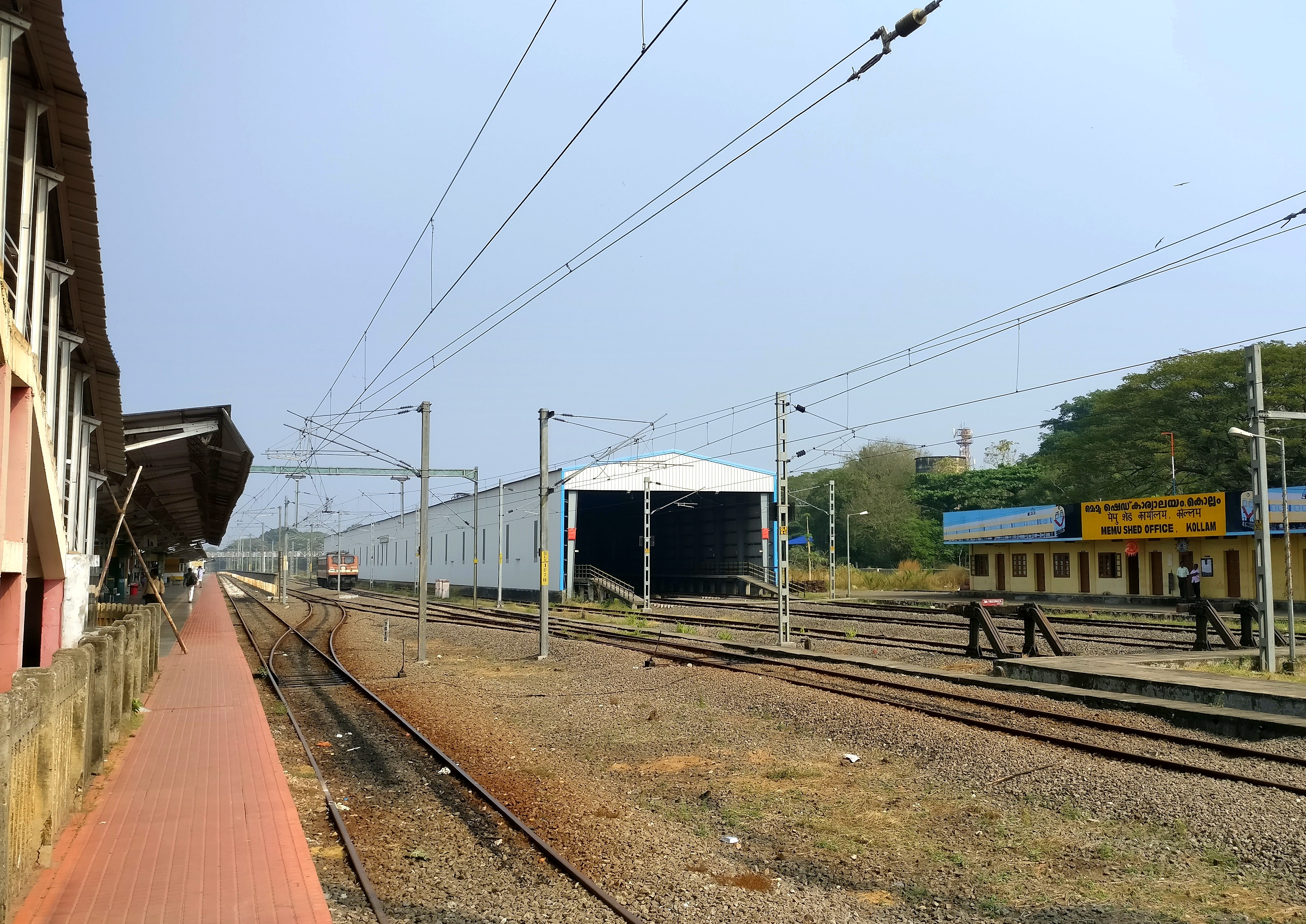
Kollam MEMU Shed in the station

A new suburban rail system has been proposed by the Government of Kerala and Indian Railways on the route Thiruvananthapuram - Kollam - Haripad/Chengannur for which MRVC is tasked to conduct a study and submit a report. Ten trains, each with 7 bogies, will transport passengers back and forth along the Trivandrum-Kollam-Chengannur-Harippad section. The Suburban Corridor is modelled on the lines of the Mumbai Suburban Rail, where around 3,000 suburban trains run every day.

The Kollam - Punalur - Edamon section of Sengottai rail line which runs parallel to the busy and congested Kollam - Punalur national highway is suitable for DEMU operations.

=== Kollam MEMU Shed ===
Kollam MEMU Shed is a motive power depot facility for maintaining MEMU rakes, situated in the city of Kollam in the Indian state of Kerala. It is one of the four MEMU rake maintenance sheds serving the Southern Railway zone of the Indian Railways. Presently, 5 pairs of MEMU services are now running from Kollam Junction. The maintenance works of those rakes are regularly doing in Kollam MEMU shed.

== Air Transportation ==
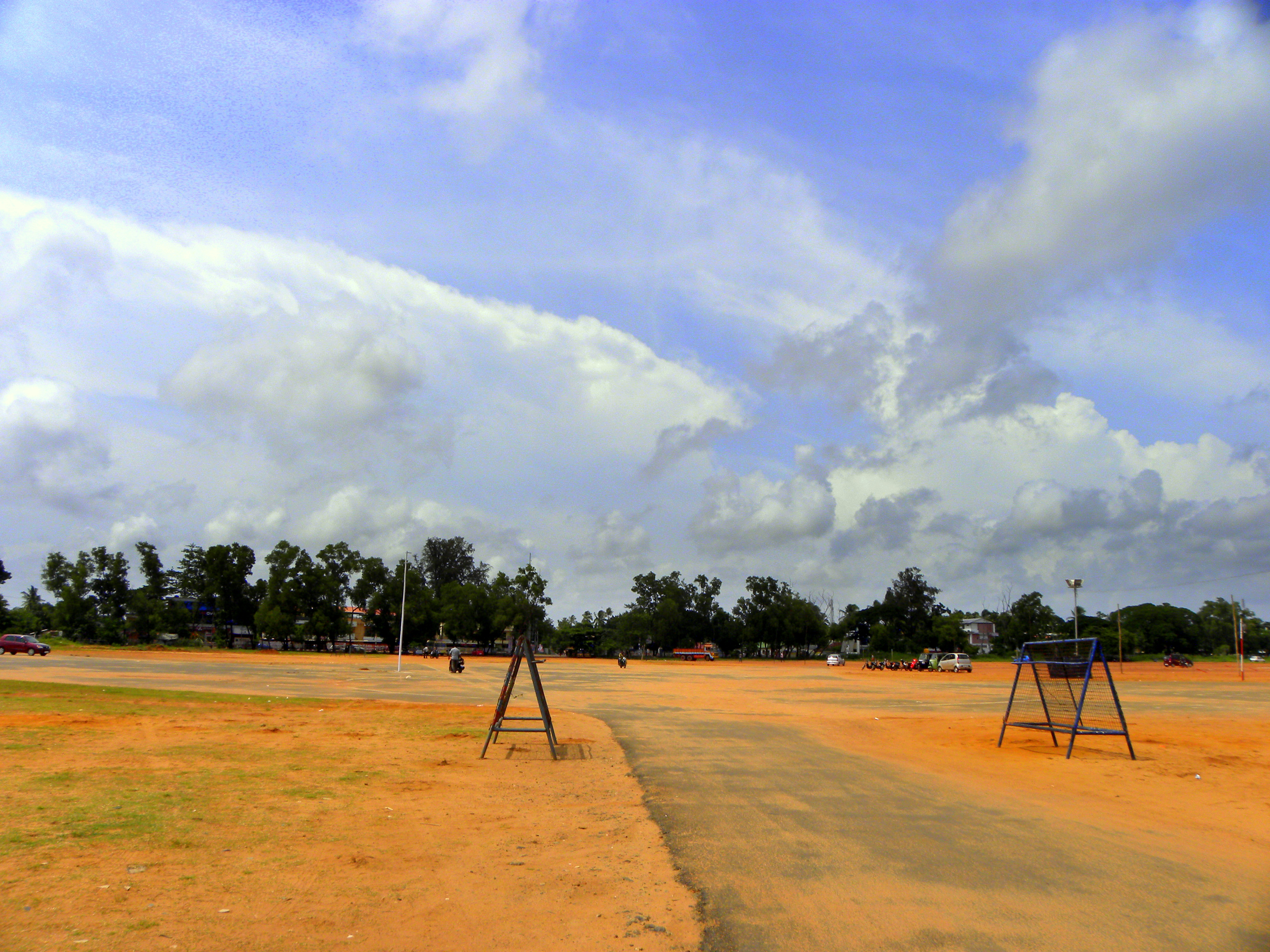
Old Kollam Airport area

Currently there are no airports in the city of Kollam. However, Quilon Aerodrome at Asramam was the first aerodrome in Kerala. The first flight to Kerala landed at Kollam Asramam Airport. Now the old airport area is serving as a twin-helipad of the city, which is about 1 km away from the city center. The city is served by Trivandrum International Airport, which is about 56 kilometers from Kollam. Trivandrum International Airport is the first international airport in a non-metro city in India and the only airport in Kerala having more than 2 Terminals. Daily domestic flight services are available from Trivandrum airport to major cities such as Mumbai, Chennai, Delhi, Bangalore and Kochi. International flight services connecting to Sharjah, Dubai, Abu Dhabi, Bahrain, Kuwait, Muscat, Male, Doha, Singapore and Colombo are available from here. The first Amphibian Aircraft (Seaplane) of Kerala also landed in Kollam.

=== Kerala Seaplane Project ===
Kerala Seaplane was a commercial seaplane service promoted by Kerala Tourism Infrastructure Limited in the Indian state of Kerala. It was launched on 2 June 2013 at Kollam with the inaugural flight being operated by Kairali Aviation. However, commercial operations could not start due to opposition from the local fishing community. The Kerala Government was keen on restarting regular operations of the project in 2014. The service was to be the first such service in mainland India, and the second in India after Jal Hans, which operates seaplanes in the Andaman and Nicobar Islands.

== Water Transportation ==
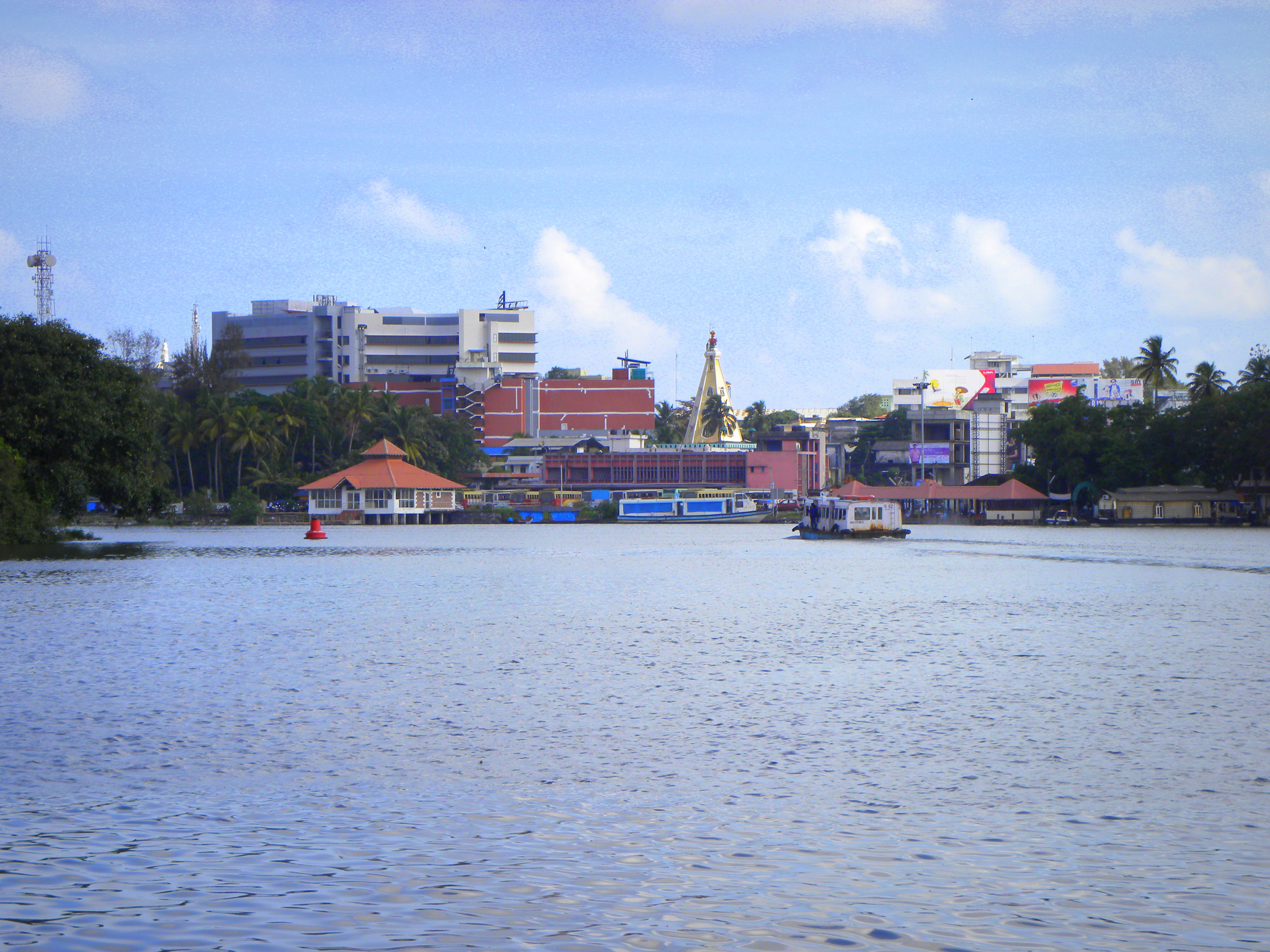
A moving ferry at Ashtamudi Lake, Kollam

City of Kollam is served by boats and ferry services operated by Kerala State Water Transport Department. Kollam is one among the 6 districts served by the inland navigation water transport facilities in the Indian state of Kerala. Kollam KSWTD Boat Jetty is situated near Cutchery. Kerala State Water Transport Department is operating daily ferry services from Kollam Boat Jetty that connect city of Kollam with the suburbs like Sampranikkodi, Guhanandapuram and Pezhumthuruthu. In addition to that, the District Tourism Promotion Councils (DTPC) of Kollam is running Kollam-Alappuzha boat services on alternative days of the week.

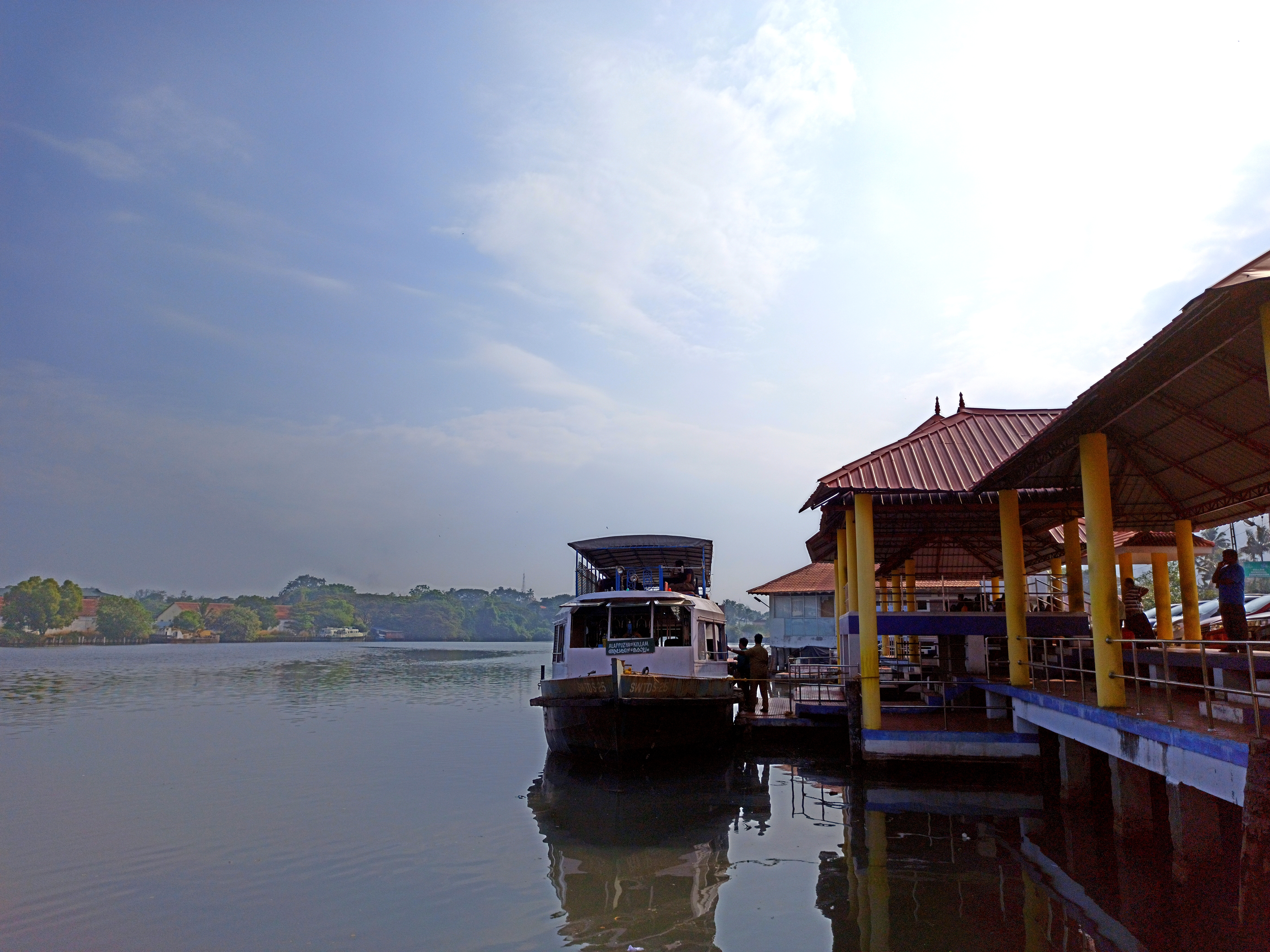
Kollam-Alappuzha tourist boat at Kollam KSWTD Ferry Terminal

=== Kollam Port ===
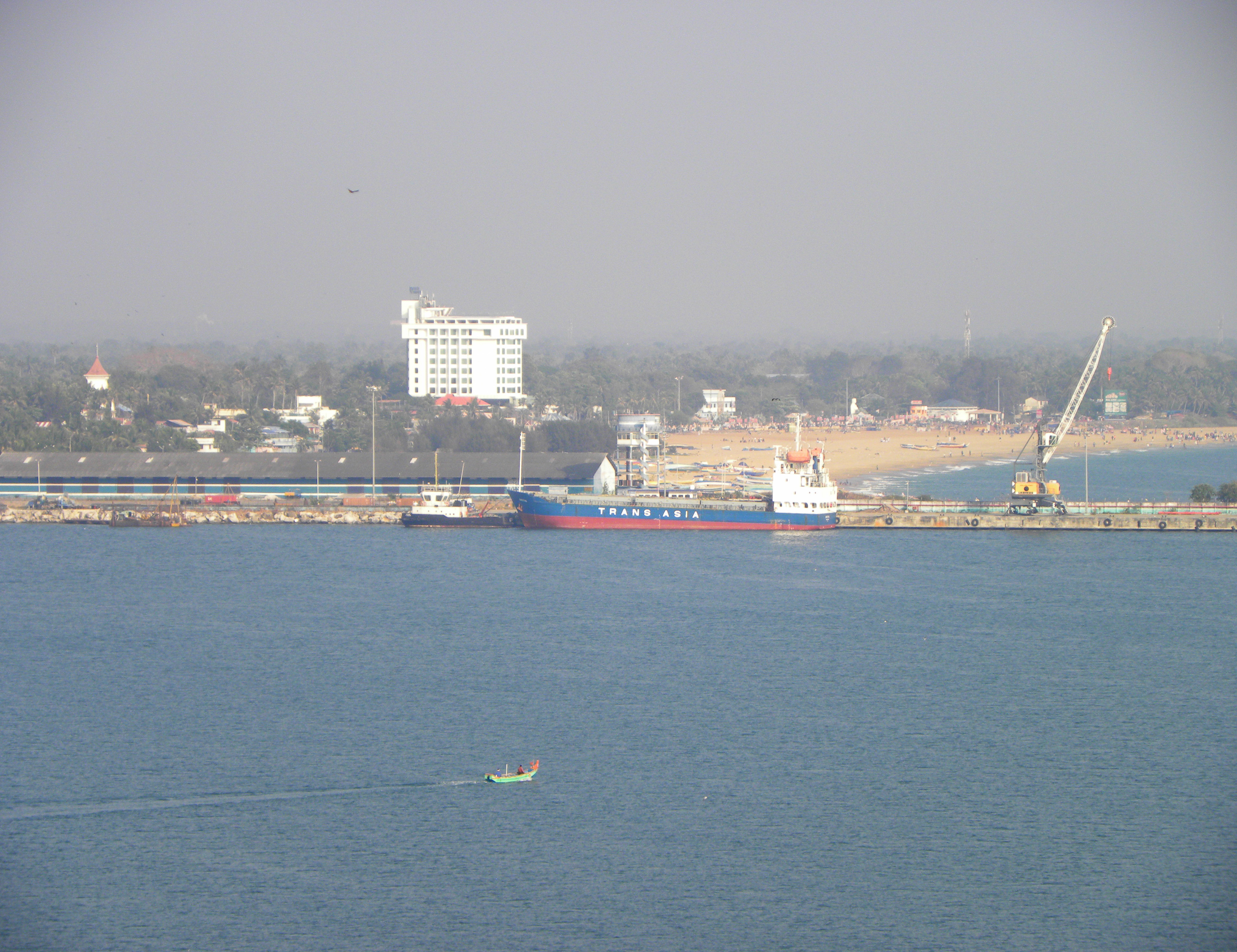
A distant view of Kollam Port

The city of Kollam is served by Kollam Port (Thangasseri Port), which is the second largest port in Kerala. Kollam Port is one of the two International Ports in Kerala. Cargo handling facility had been kicked off at Kollam Port in 2013. Foreign ships are now coming to Kollam Port regularly. The first foreign ship that reached the modern Port of Kollam after the independence of India was the MV Alina, a mammoth 145-meter vessel registered in Antigua. It anchored in the port on 4 April 2014. Nowadays foreign and domestic ships anchoring at Kollam Port is a regular scene of the city.

Kollam Port is the closest sea port in mainland to Minicoy Island of Lakshadweep, there has been many discussions on introducing cargo and passenger ships in this route. However lack of refuelling and berthing facilities in Kollam port and poor political patronage, it is a non starter.

=== Water Metro ===
LDF government in kerala has initiated steps in implementing water metro in Kollam. This will be the second water metro in Kerala after Kochi. This project is expected to take lesser costs than cochin and expected to complete by 2018. This will be a big boost Kollam traffic planning and tourism.

Since Kollam has the Trivandrum Shoranur canal passing north south from the city through suburbs like Eravipuram, Mayyanad, Paravur, Mundakkal, Kavanad, Chavara and Ashtamudi backwater and its branches connecting with major places along Kundara, Kallada, Perumon, Mangadu, Kallada, Thevalakkara, Munroe Island etc Water Metro can be a game changer in Kollam, if conceived, implemented effectively at the earliest.

== See also ==
- Kollam
- Kollam Metropolitan Area
- Kollam Junction railway station
- Kollam KSRTC Bus Station
- Kollam Port
- Kollam KSWTD Ferry Terminal
- Kollam Airport
