= Kattaka Kayal =

Lake in Kollam, India

Kottakkal Kayal
- Kattakayal
- Location in Kollam city Kottakkal Kayal (Kerala)
- Location: Sakthikulangara in Kollam, India
- Coordinates: 8°55′23.0268″N 76°32′39.2136″E
- Type: Stream
- Part of: Ashtamudi Lake
- Primary inflows: Vattakayal in Maruthadi
- Catchment area: 14.5 ha (0.056 sq mi)
- Basin countries: India
- Managing agency: Kollam Municipal Corporation
- Designation: Sagara Samskarika Sangham
- Max. length: 2 km (1.2 mi)
- Max. width: 30 m (0.030 km)
- Surface area: 36 acres (15 ha)
- Islands: none
- Settlements: Kollam

Kattaka Kayal (Malayalam: കട്ടക കായല്‍) or Kattakayal is a freshwater lake in Kollam city in the Kerala state of India. The lake connects Vattakayal, a 36-acre (15 ha) freshwater lake in Maruthadi, with Ashtamudi Lake in the city.

== History ==
Kattak Kayal is a part of Ashtamudi Lake and Vattakayal in Kollam. The two km (1.2 mi) long stream was once the lifeline for most of the commercial activities at Sakthikulangara. Its width was 90 to 120 meters (300 to 390 ft) before 50 years. Three boat jetties were there along the course of Kattaka Kayal then and huge cargo vessels berthing for loading and unloading seafood items were a common view of Quilon city those days. It was home for more than 20 species of edible fish including Karimeen and Poomeen.

== Revival Program ==
A revival program for Vattakayal and Kattaka Kayal has been launched at Kollam on 1 November 2016 by V. Rajendrababu, Mayor of Kollam Municipal Corporation. Kattakayal Punarjeevana Padhadi is an initiative of the Shakthikulangara-based cultural organisation Sagara Samskarika Sangham. The main aim of this program is to revive both the lakes through various phases that includes cleaning of the lake and awareness campaigns.

== See also ==
- Kollam
- Sakthikulangara
- Ashtamudi Lake
- Maruthadi
