= Sarojini Balanandan =

Indian politician (1938–2023

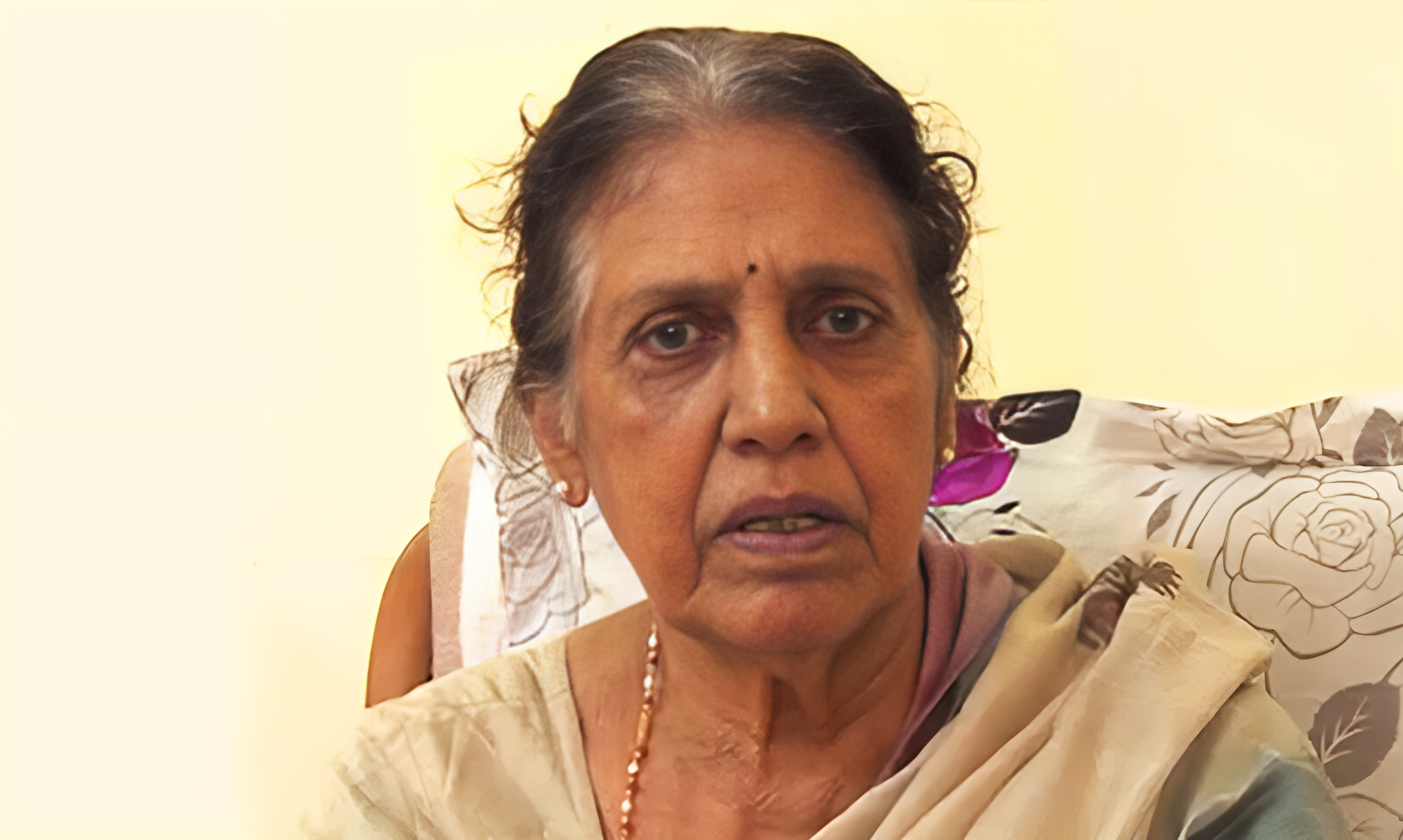

Personal details
- Born: 15 May 1938 Sakthikulangara, Travancore, British Raj
- Died: 29 August 2023 (aged 85)
- Party: Communist Party of India (Marxist)
- Spouse: E. Balanandan

Sarojini Balanandan (15 May 1938 – 29 August 2023) was an Indian politician from Kerala. She was a prominent leader of the All India Democratic Women's Association (AIDWA) and has served as the Kerala state committee member of the Communist Party of India (Marxist). Sarojini's husband E. Balanandan was also a communist politician.

== Biography ==
Sarojini was born on 15 May 1938 in Shaktikulangara, Kollam, Kerala as the daughter of Kesavan and Narayani. She married E Balanandan on 1 September 1957, before completing her intermediate studies at SN College for Women, Kollam. Balanandan had to stay away from home for a few days due to the labor strike at Sreechitra Mill. Meanwhile, Sarojini took up a job as a clerk in the Ashoka Textile Workers' Cooperative in Aluva. Balanandan has written in his autobiography that Sarojini used to work as a dairy farmer, raising buffaloes and cows to meet household needs during the Emergency. During that time, she was not an office bearer in any of the trade unions. However, she became a front runner in workers' rights struggles and organizing women in working families. In the 1970s, women's activists, including Sarojini fought against the hoarding of essential goods by some wholesalers in Ernakulam Broadway, causing excessive price hikes. The women leaders who participated in the strike were beaten up by the shopkeepers and their goons who lowered the shutters of the shop and locked them inside. Traders were forced to reduce prices as the strike gained popular support. In 1986, Sarojini was beaten up while participating in a labor rally held as part of the CITU's all-India strike. She was in hospital for several days after breaking a bone in her hand. Sarojini was the first woman administrator of Kalamasery. She was the Panchayat President of Kalamassery (now Municipality) during 1979-84 period. Sarojini was the State President of the Mahila Association from 1983 to 1997 and also served as the All India Vice President of the association for a long time. She became a member of the CPI-M State Committee in 1985 and remained in that position for 27 years. Meanwhile, from 1996 to 2001, she served as the Chairperson of the State Social Welfare Board. After her resignation from the state committee in 2012, Sarojini was active in politics while her health allowed. She was a part of the strike called by the party when he was resting at his daughter's house in Paravur during the COVID-19 pandemic. Sarojini died on 29 August 2023, at the age of 85.
