= Wrestling in Kollam =

The history of wrestling in Kollam (historically known as Gatta Gusthi) represents a rich cultural tradition of the region, flourishing throughout the mid-20th century. The district served as a major hub for traditional wrestling, nurturing renowned local wrestlers (Phalawans) and hosting national-level tournaments as well as exhibitions featuring legendary international figures. There were three permanent Godas (wrestling rings) in Kollam those years. The gate collection for Polachira Ramachandran’s fight with Shamsudeen Shahudeen from Gwalior was an astonishing figure of Rs one lakh at that time. There were many incidents of gallery collapse because of heavy rush of the crowd.

== History and Venues ==
During the 1940s and 1950s, wrestling matches in Kollam were held across multiple designated arenas (Godas) and temporary grounds like Majlis Ground (located opposite the YMCA, Kollam), Shahal Tin Shed (Takarakkotta) on Curzon Road, Relief Ground (site of major exhibition bouts in the 1940s), Vandipetta (located at the site of the former Zenith Theatre, organized by Janab M. K. Sayed Muhammad and Coach Kayikkara) etc. There was some regional Hubs also - Mulankadakam, Lal Bahadur Shastri Stadium, Vadi, Tangasseri, Karamukku, and Paravur.

In 1967, Kollam hosted the National Wrestling Championship. Traditional training centers included Kesavan Asan Kalari at Karamukku (near Tangasseri) and Punnathala Kalari in Kollam.

A surviving commercial landmark of this era is the Fayalwan Hotel in Chamakkada. Founded by wrestler Muhammad Kunju, the establishment originally operated as an eatery providing high-protein meals—including mutton soup, mutton dishes, appams, and biryani—to local and visiting wrestlers. The local wrestling culture inspired regional literature. Novelist Nooranad Haneef, while serving as a teacher at Mulankadakam School, authored the sports-themed novel Goda.

== Prominent Local Wrestlers ==
The region produced several prominent wrestlers (Fayalwans)

- Electric Maatheenkunju: A disciple of Valladan, he earned the moniker "Electric" due to his aggressive technique, frequently pinning opponents immediately after the initial ceremonial handshake.
- Kollam Rasheed: A wrestler who transitioned into cinema, appearing in wrestling-themed Malayalam films such as Mutharamkunnu P.O. and Oridathoru Phayalwan.
- Kerala Gama Polachira Ramachandran: A top-tier wrestler who competed against international opponents, including Himambux in the final major bout held in Kollam.

Additional Notable Figures includes Manakkad Narayana Pillai, Kattachira Pappudas, Aslam Basheer, Nickel Jamal, Wadi Sukumaran, Prakkulam Koyakutty, Veluthakunju, Shanmughadas, Mundan Velayudhan, and Panayara Muhammad Kunju (former Panchayat President of Karunagappally).
