= Kendriya Vidyalaya, Kollam =

Location
- Ramankulangara, Kavanad PO; Kollam, Kerala, 691012; India; 8.899556°N 76.565385°E

Information
- Type: Kendriya Vidyalaya
- Motto: Tatvam Pooshan Apaavrunu
- Established: 6 August 2007; 31 May 2018; Moved to own campus
- School district: Kollam district
- Principal: Kumara Mohan G.
- Headmistress: Beena Balakrishnan
- Faculty: 23
- Grades: 1 to 12
- Gender: coed
- Enrollment: 686 (as of 2012)
- Campus type: Urban
- Affiliations: CBSE No. 900030
- Website: Kendriya Vidyalaya Kollam

Kendriya Vidyalaya Kollam or KV Kollam is a central government owned Kendriya Vidyalaya school in Kollam. The school is located at Ramankulangara in the city. The school has set up in 2007 at Mulangadakam. KV Kollam was officially inaugurated on 6 August 2007 by P. Rajendran, the then MP of Kollam.

== History ==
KV kollam was started in 2007 as per the sanction accorded by the Govt. of India in special focus district which have no Kendriya Vidyalaya and is inaugurated at Ramankulangara in the city by P. Rajendran, the then MP from Kollam Lok Sabha constituency, on 6 August 2007. In 2010, Kollam city Corporation has acquired four acres of private land at Ramankulangara in the city at a cost of Rs.1.35 crore for the school to have its own complex. On 31 May 2018, the School shifted to its new building at Ramankulangara. In 2015, a new Kendriya Vidyalaya has been allotted for the district of Kollam at Kottarakara.

== Location ==
The nearest major transport hubs:

- Nearest Bus Stations: Kollam KSRTC Bus Station (2.9 km), Andamukkam City Bus Stand (3.8 km) and Tangasseri Bus Terminal (2.5 km)
- Nearest Railway Station: Kollam Junction (4.1 km)
- Nearest Sea Port: Kollam Port (2.9 km)
- Nearest Airport: Kollam Helipad (Old Airport) (3 km) and Trivandrum International Airport (69.6 km)

== Facilities ==
- Class rooms (36)
- Computer Lab (3)
- Chemistry Lab
- Physics Lab
- Library
- Jr. Science Lab
- Staff Common Room

== See also ==
- Kollam
- Mulamkadakam
- Chinmaya Vidyalaya, Kollam
- Ramankulangara
- List of Kendriya Vidyalayas
