= E. Balanandan =

Indian politician

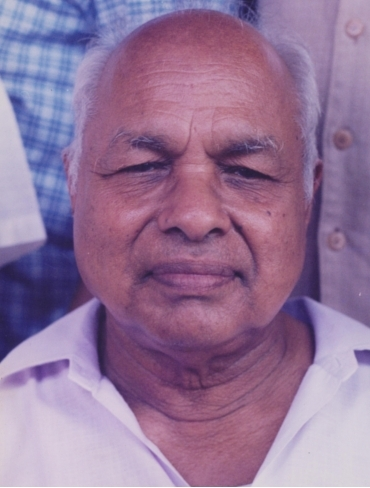

Member of Parliament, Rajya Sabha
- In office 2 July 1988 – 1 July 2000
- Constituency: Kerala

Member of Parliament, Lok Sabha
- In office 1980–1984
- Preceded by: A. C. George
- Succeeded by: K. Mohandas
- Constituency: Mukundapuram

Member of the Kerala Legislative Assembly
- In office 1967–1977
- Constituency: Vadakkekara

Member of the Politburo of the Communist Party of India (Marxist)
- In office 1978–2005

Personal details
- Born: 16 June 1924 Quilon, Kingdom of Travancore, British India (present day Kollam, Kerala, India)
- Died: 19 January 2009 (aged 84) Kochi, Ernakulam, Kerala, India
- Party: Communist Party of India (Marxist)
- Other political affiliations: Indian National Congress; Communist Party of India
- Spouse: Sarojini Balanandan
- Parents: Kunjiraman Channar; Unnikaali Easwari

E. Balanandan (16 June 1924 – 19 January 2009) was an Indian politician and a trade union leader from the Kerala State of India. He had been a member of the Communist Party of India (Marxist)'s (CPI(M)) politburo since 1978. Born in Sakthikulangara, Kollam district, he was the son of Kunjiraman Channar and Unnikaali Easwari. His wife Sarojini Balanandan was a former CPI(M) State Committee member.

Balanandan initiated his political career in the Indian National Congress, but he later joined the Communist Party of India in 1943, and then the CPI(M) in 1964. When CITU was formed in 1970 he became the first Secretary of the Kerala State Committee and later he was elected as the Treasurer of the all India CITU. He became the all India President of the CITU in 1990 and continued in this position till 2002. Balandan was elected to the CPI(M) Politburo at the 10th party congress of CPI(M), held in Jalandhar in 1978, and remained a Politburo member till 2005.

From 1967 to 1977, he was a member of the Kerala Legislative Assembly. In 1980, he was elected for a four-year term to the 7th Lok Sabha, the lower house of India's bicameral parliament from Mukundapuram constituency. He was elected to the upper house, Rajya Sabha twice in 1988 and 1994.

Balanandan was the President of the Centre of Indian Trade Unions and of the Electricity Employees' Federation of India.

Balanandan died on 19 January 2009 at a private hospital in Kochi in Kerala, where he was admitted due to respiratory illness. He had suffered from lung cancer for some time.
