= Ramankulangara =

- Neighbourhood
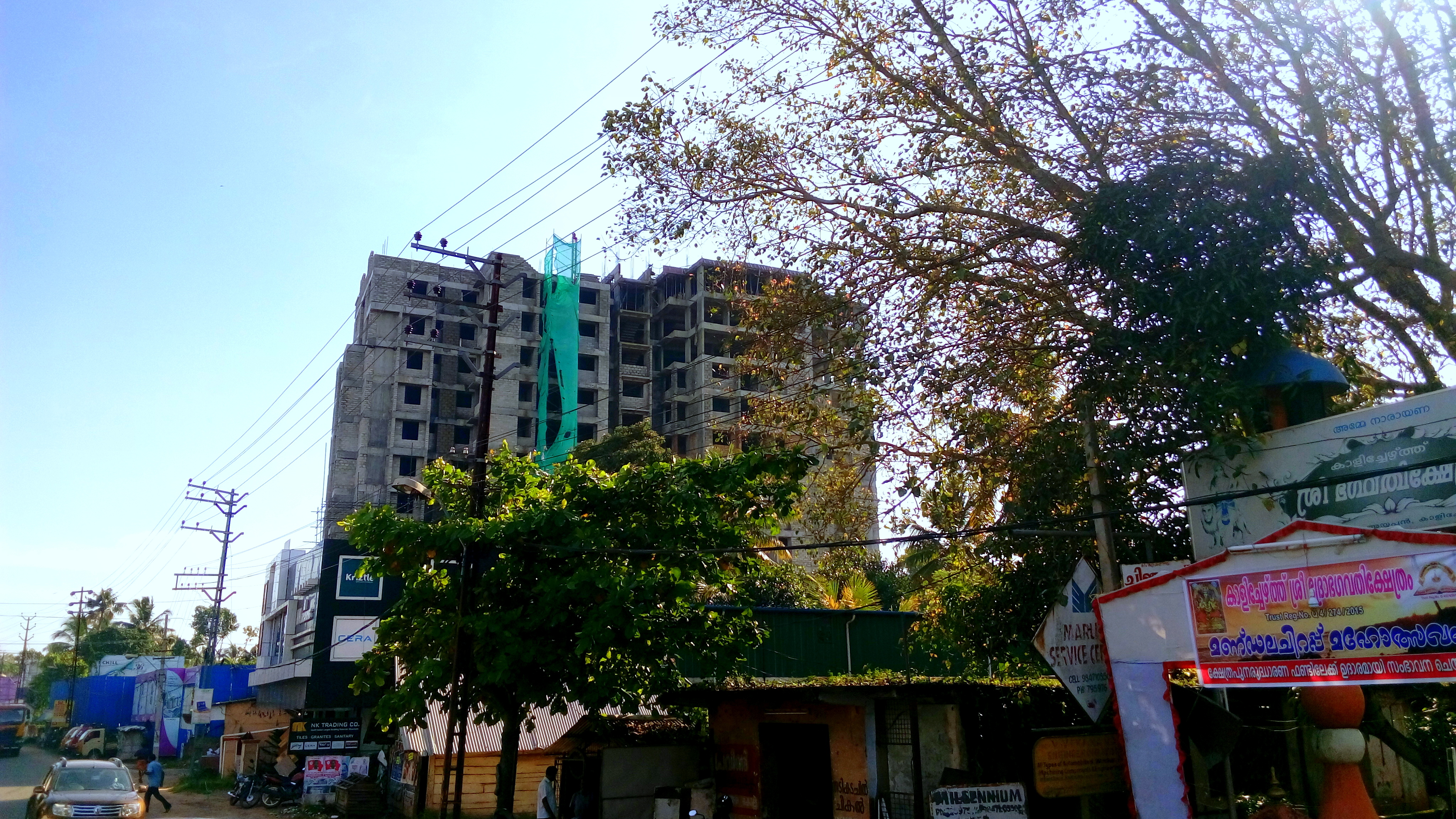
- A highriser under construction at Ramankulangara

- Location in Kollam, India Ramankulangara (Kerala)
- Coordinates: 8°54′21″N 76°33′41″E
- Country: India
- State: Kerala
- District: Kollam

Government
  - Body: Kollam Municipal Corporation(KMC)

Languages
  - Official: Malayalam, English
- Time zone: UTC+5:30 (IST)
- PIN: 691003
- Vehicle registration: KL-02
- Lok Sabha constituency: Kollam
- Civic agency: Kollam Municipal Corporation
- Avg. summer temperature: 34 °C (93 °F)
- Avg. winter temperature: 22 °C (72 °F)
- Website: http://www.kollam.nic.in

Ramankulangara is a neighbourhood of Kollam city, India. It is 4 km away from Chinnakada and nearly 5 km from Kollam Junction Railway Station. Ramankulangara lies on the north side of the city. It is in Kavanad council of Kollam Municipal Corporation.

== Places of interest ==
Most of the parts of Ramankulangara lies on the banks of Ashtamudi Lake. Vattakkayal, another freshwater lake in Kollam city, is located just 2 km to the west of Ramankulangara. BSF is planning to start a water training centre in Vattakkayal. The final decision is yet to come. Ramankulangara is also an important trading centre of the Kollam corporation famous for fish and vegetables. Maruthadi just 2 km from Ramankulangara is an important fishing centre. Ramankulangara was chosen for the proposed Law College of Kollam and for the Kendriya Vidyalaya which is currently functioning at Mulamkadakam. The new campus for Kollam Kendriya Vidyalaya is at Ramankulangara now.

== Politics ==
Ramankulangara is part of the Kollam Loksabha Constituency and part of the Kollam Legislative Constituency.

== See also ==
- Kollam
- Kollam Port
- Kollam district
- Kollam Junction
- Kollam KSRTC Bus Station
- Kollam Beach
- Paravur
