= Neendakara Bridge =

Bridge in Neendakara, India

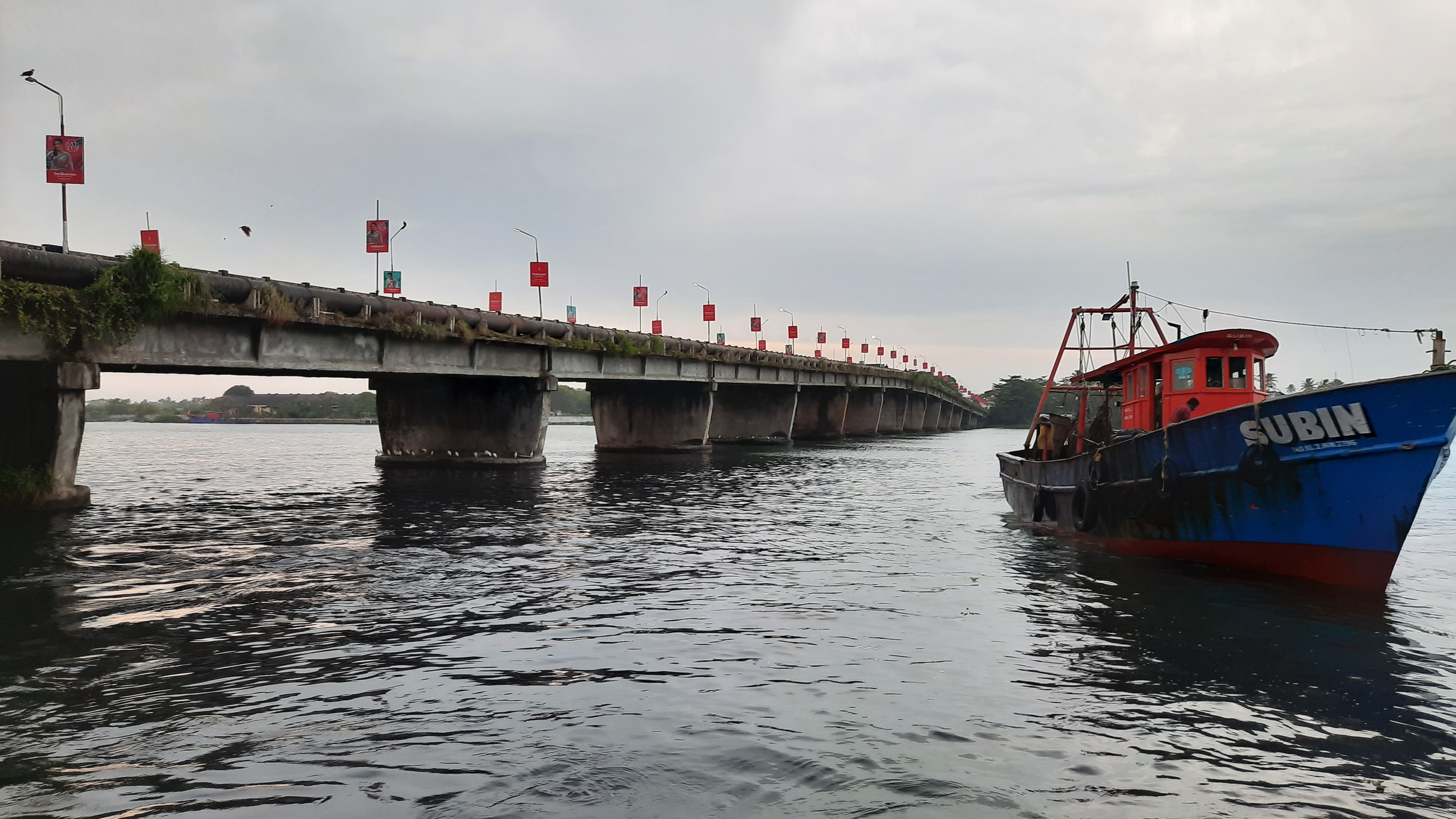
- Neendakara bridge
- Coordinates: 8.9349°N 76.5448°E
- Carries: Road
- Crosses: Ashtamudi Lake
- Locale: Neendakara, Kollam
- Other name(s): Setu Lakshmi Bayi Bridge

Characteristics
- Total length: 422.5 m

History
- Opened: 24th February 1972

The Neendakara Bridge, located on National Highway 66 in Kollam district, Kerala, India spans 422.5 meters across Ashtamudi Lake. It was inaugurated on February 24, 1972, by T. K. Divakaran, the then Public Works Department Minister. The bridge includes a footpath and connects the Chavara and Kollam areas. It is the second longest bridge in Kollam district.
