= Maruthadi =

Maruthadi Maruthady
- Neighbourhood
- Location in Kollam, India Maruthadi (Kerala) Maruthadi (India)
- Coordinates: 8.918603°N 76.543561°E
- Country: India
- State: Kerala
- District: Kollam

Government
  - Body: Kollam Municipal Corporation(KMC)

Languages
  - Official: Malayalam, English
- Time zone: UTC+5:30 (IST)
- PIN: 691003
- Vehicle registration: KL-02
- Lok Sabha constituency: Kollam
- Civic agency: Kollam Municipal Corporation
- Avg. summer temperature: 34 °C (93 °F)
- Avg. winter temperature: 22 °C (72 °F)
- Website: http://www.kollam.nic.in

Maruthadi or Maruthady is a coastal town situated in the city of Kollam, Kerala, India. The place is very famous in the state for its fishing activities. The presence of Kattaka Kayal, a two-km long stream that once served as the lifeline for most of the commercial activities at Sakthikulangara and the 36-acre Vattakayal are making Maruthadi an important tourism spot in the city.

== Location ==
- Ramankulangara (NH-47) - 2.8 km
- Andamukkam City Bus Stand - 7.3 km
- Kollam KSRTC Bus Station - 6.4 km
- Kollam Junction railway station - 7.6 km
- Kollam Port - 6.2 km
- Chinnakada - 6.9 km
- Kadappakada - 8.6 km
- Thirumullavaram - 4 km

== Kollam Port City Project ==
The Kerala Government has decided to develop the City of Kollam as a "Port City of Kerala". They have decided to do a face lift of the Maruthadi-Eravipuram area of the city as part of the "Kollam Port City" project. Sports, Fishing, Tourism and entertainment projects will be implemented in this region as part of the project

== See also ==
- Andamukkam City Bus Stand
- Asramam Maidan
- Chinnakada
- Kadappakada
- Kollam
- Kollam Beach
