= Kavanad =

Kavanad Kavanad
- Neighbourhood
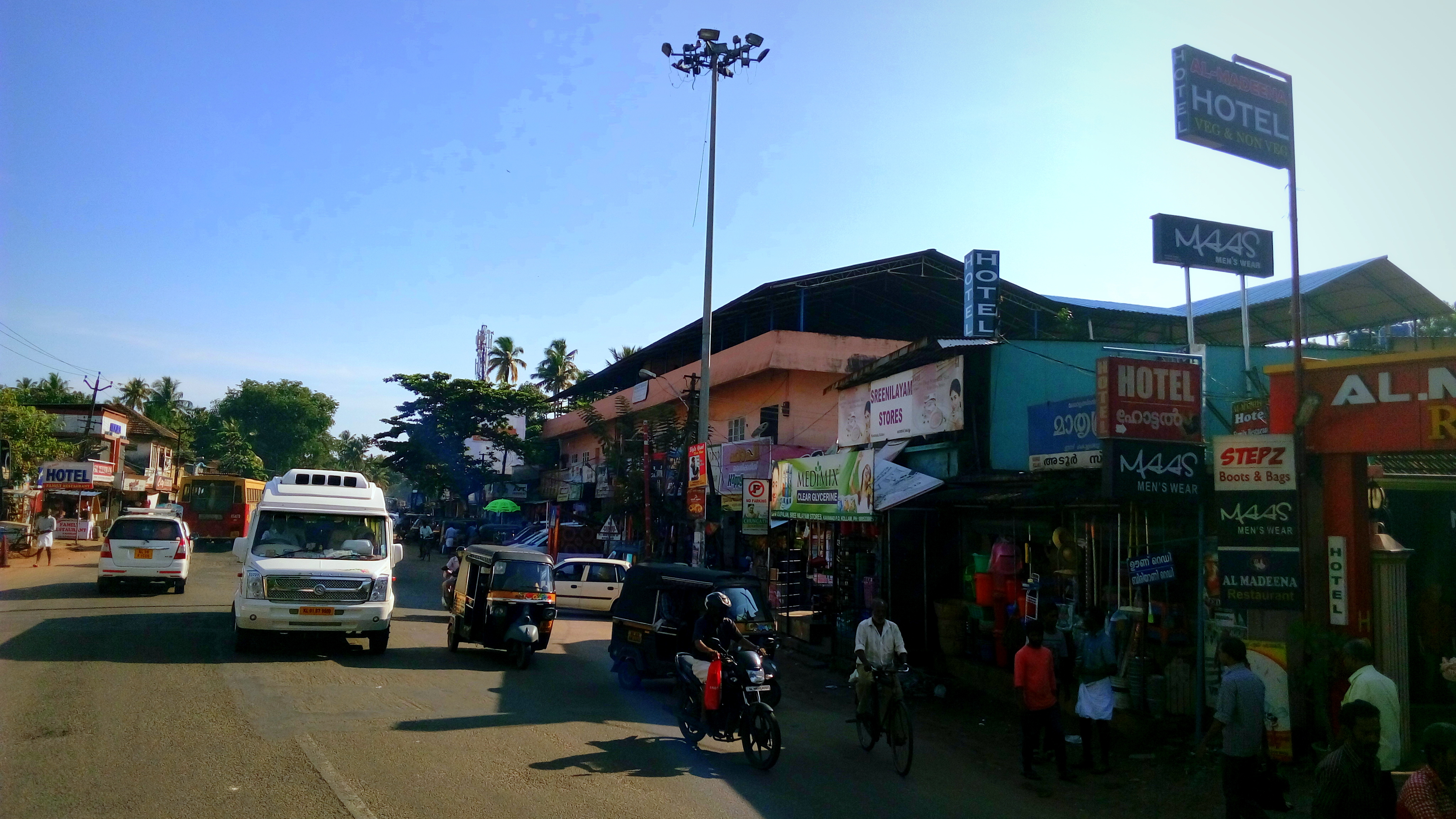
- Kavanad Junction

- Location in Kollam, India Kavanad (Kerala)
- Coordinates: 8°54′49″N 76°33′25″E
- Country: India
- State: Kerala
- District: Kollam

Government
  - Type: Municipal corporation
  - Body: Kollam Municipal Corporation(KMC)

Languages
  - Official: Malayalam, English
- Time zone: UTC+5:30 (IST)
- PIN: 691003
- Vehicle registration: KL-02
- Lok Sabha constituency: Kollam
- Civic agency: Kollam Municipal Corporation
- Avg. summer temperature: 34 °C (93 °F)
- Avg. winter temperature: 22 °C (72 °F)
- Website: http://www.kollam.nic.in

Kavanad is a suburban area of Kollam Municipal Corporation in Kerala. It is a major market town located at the northern suburb of Kollam City in India. It is coming under Sakthikulangara zone of Kollam Municipal Corporation. It is just 3 km from the port town of Neendakara. Kavanad, a narrow strip of land sandwiched between the Arabian Sea and the Ashtamudi Lake has one of the highest land values in Kollam city. The town emerged as a major shopping destination in Kollam with the advent of a number of shopping centres. A number of vehicle showrooms are also located at Kavanad-Ramankulangara-Mulamkadakam stretch. The long anticipated Kollam bypass starts just a kilometer before Kavanad from the place called Altharamoodu and was completed in January 2019, Kavanadu had become a major vantage point en route to Trivandrum from Alappuzha and is a fast developing satellite town within Kollam Metropolitan Area.

== History ==
In 16 th century Kavanadu was called 'Kaval Nadu' or 'Kaval Maadam'. At that period, about 2 km radius is covered with 'kaav', 'maadam' and surrounded with Ashtamudi lake and the Arabian sea. As time passes Kaval Naadu changed to Kavanad. The main identity of this place is the market. Neendakara and sakthikulangara harbour is a port where earlier, small traders came and sell their products. Later these sellers spread to Kavanad on a small scale. As years passed traders from southern side of Kollam also came to Kavanad which led to the formation of Kavanad market.

== Geography ==
Kavanad is located on the northern end of Kollam city Corporation, on the west coast.

== Location ==
It is on National Highway 66 between Kollam and Karunagappally. Nearest railway station is Kollam Junction Railway Station which is 5 km away.

Nearest airport is Thiruvananthapuram Airport around 75 km away.

== School ==
Lake Ford School, St Mary's residential central school are the CBSE curriculum schools in Kavanadu. Holy family convent Aravila, Government UP School Venkulangara, are the other schools in Kavanadu vallikeezhu Girls Higher Secondary school is one of the government schools with highest percentage of victory in the state. Apart from these schools a lot of vocational training centres are also located in Kavanadu.

== Economy ==
Kavanad has a flourishing fish and sea food export/processing industry, due to its proximity to the Arabian Sea and Ashtamudi Lake. Sreesatha temple, Muhiyudeen Masjid and Mukkad Holy Family Church are the major places of worship in Kavanad. Kavanad falls under the Kollam Corporation Circle. The people of kavanad majorly occupied in fishing related businesses. A lot of people also travels abroad to gulf countries for better prospects. Kavanadu market is one of the biggest markets in Kollam district and a lot of people from other parts of Kollam come here to purchase fresh fish, meat, vegetables etc.

== See also ==
- Kollam
- Kollam Port
- Kollam district
- Kollam Junction
- Kollam Beach
- Paravur

Poovanpuzha Temple
