= Mulamkadakam =

Mulamkadakam Mulamkadakom
- Neighbourhood
- Location in Kollam, India Mulamkadakam (Kerala) Mulamkadakam (India)
- Coordinates: 8°53′46.6″N 76°33′59.34″E
- Country: India
- Region: Desinganadu
- State: Kerala
- City: Kollam
- Governing Body: Kollam Municipal Corporation

Languages
  - Official: Malayalam
- Time zone: UTC+5:30 (IST)
- PIN: 691 003
- Telephone code: 0474
- Vehicle registration: KL-02
- Website: Kollam Municipal Corporation

Mulamkadakam or Mulangadakam / Mulamkadakom is a neighbourhood of Kollam (Quilon) city, India. It is situated at the northern region of the city. Mulamkadakam is the 7th ward of Kollam Municipal Corporation which is in Sakthikulangara zone of the city. Devi temple at Mulamkadakam is famous in the state. Kerala University's University Institute of Technology centre is situated at Mulamkadakam.

== Importance ==
National Highway-47 is passing through Mulamkadakam. It is a residential commercial area in Kollam city. One of the public cemeteries of Kollam city is situated at Mulamkadakam. Mulamkadakam is coming under Thirumullavaram post office range. Mulamkadakam is also an education centre of the city. Kendriya Vidyalaya in Kollam city is situated at Mulamkadakam. Apart from that, a higher secondary school and a University Institute of Technology(UIT) centre are situated at Mulamkadakam. Many temples and mosques are there in the surrounding areas of Mulamkadakam. It is very close to Thoppilkadavu boat yard, Collectorate of Kollam, Thirumullavaram Beach and Anandavalleeswaram temple.

== Location ==
- Kollam KSRTC Bus Station - 2.6 km
- Kollam Junction railway station6
- .7 km
- Kollam Port - 2.3 km
- Thirumullavaram Beach - 2.3 km
- Kollam Beach - 4 km
- Paravur - 24.8 km
