= Neendakara =

- Urban village
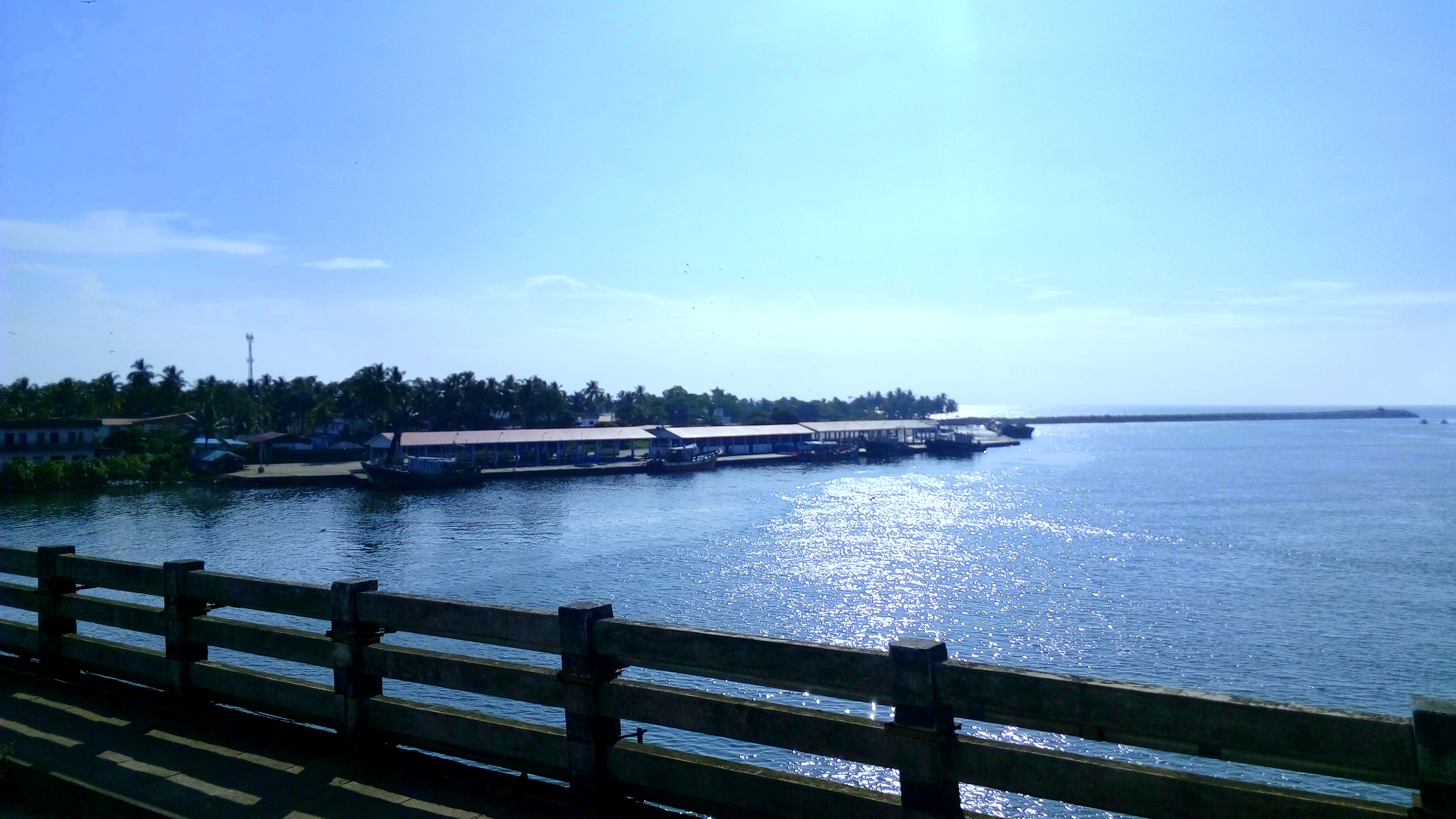
- Neendakara Port, Kollam
- Interactive map of Neendakara
- Coordinates: 8°56′19″N 76°32′25″E
- Country: India
- State: Kerala
- District: Kollam

Languages
  - Official: Malayalam, English
- Time zone: UTC+5:30 (IST)
- PIN: 691582
- Telephone code: 0476
- Vehicle registration: KL-02, KL-
- Nearest city: Kollam City (9 km)
- Climate: Tropical monsoon (Köppen)
- Avg. summer temperature: 35 °C (95 °F)
- Avg. winter temperature: 20 °C (68 °F)

Neendakara is a suburb of Kollam city in Kerala, India. The twin harbours, Neendakara and Shakthikulangara, are located here. Neendakara harbour is the largest fishing harbour in the state.

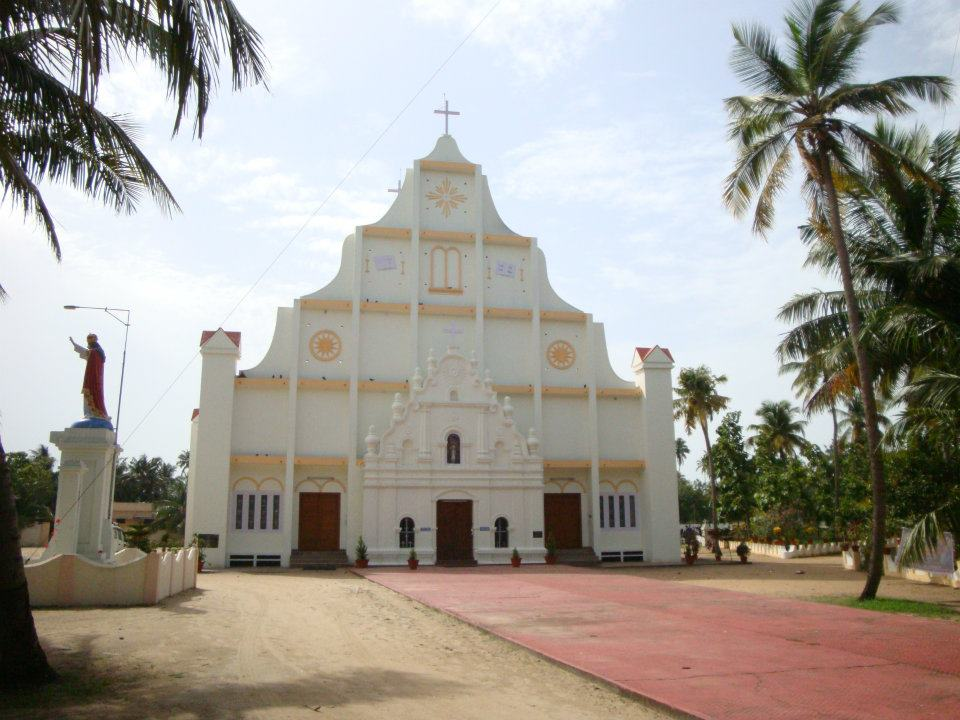
St. Sebastian's Roman Catholic Church

== Location ==
Neendakara is 30 kilometres (19 mi) north of Paravur and 14 kilometres (9 mi) south of Karunagappally town.

== History ==
When Portuguese traders settled in Kollam (then Quilon) in the early 16th century, their ships passed through the Neenadakara bar, now the site of Neendakara Bridge, part of National Highway 66, which connects the village to Sakthikulangara across Ashtamudi Lake.

== Etymology ==
In Malayalam, Neendakara means "a long bank".

== Norwegian Project ==
The headquarters of the Indo-Norwegian Fisheries Community project, established in 1953, was based in Neendakara until 1961, when the site was handed over to the Government of Kerala.

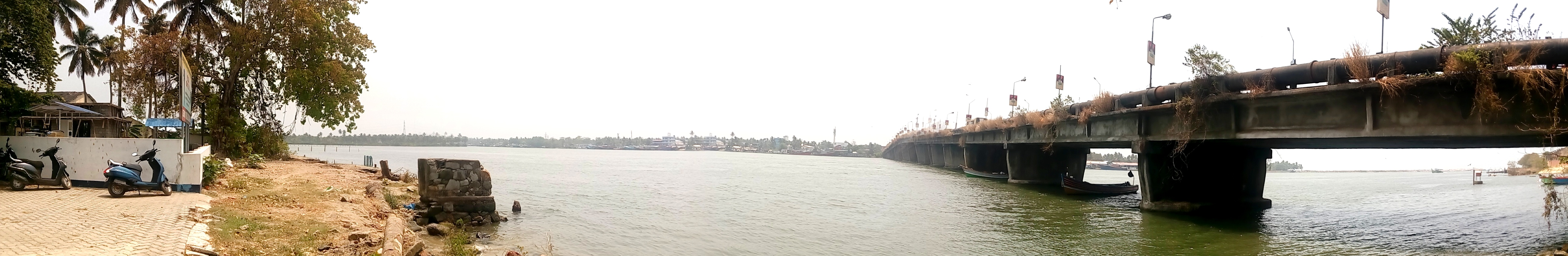
Panoramic view of Neendakara bridge and Ashtamudi Lake

== See also ==
- Indo-Norwegian Project
