= Sakthikulangara =

- Zone & Neighbourhood
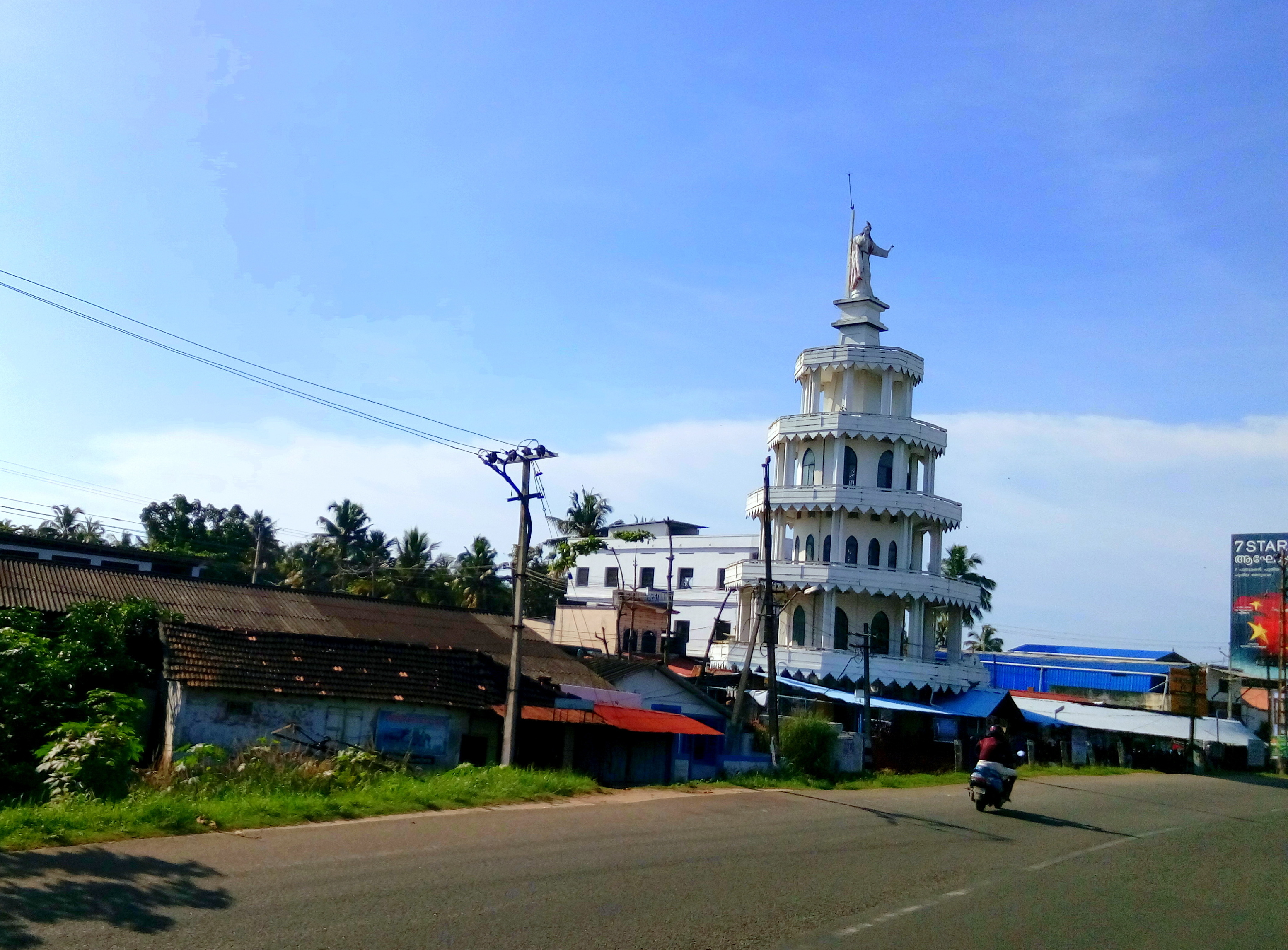
- Sakthikulangara

- Location in Kollam, India Sakthikulangara (Kerala)
- Coordinates: 8°55′30″N 76°33′22″E
- Country: India
- State: Kerala
- District: Kollam

Government
  - Type: Municipal corporation
  - Body: Kollam Municipal Corporation(KMC)

Languages
  - Official: Malayalam, English
- Time zone: UTC+5:30 (IST)
- PIN: 691581
- Vehicle registration: KL-02
- Lok Sabha constituency: Kollam
- Civic agency: Kollam Municipal Corporation
- Avg. summer temperature: 34 °C (93 °F)
- Avg. winter temperature: 22 °C (72 °F)
- Website: http://www.kollam.nic.in

Sakthikulangara is a zone and neighbourhood situated at the coastal area of the city of Kollam in Kerala India. It is one among the 6 zonal headquarters of Kollam Municipal Corporation.

== Location ==
Sakthikulangara is situated where Ashtamudi Lake confluence with the Arabian Sea. It is 7 km north from the core Kollam City and 31 km away from Paravur town. Heading from North Neendakara bridge opens the entrance to Sakthikulangara village.

== Celebrities ==
Moreover, it is the birthplace of B. Wellington, E. Balanandan, R. S. Unni and Henry Austin (Former Ambassador of India in Portugal).

== Landmarks ==
One of the major fishing harbours in Kerala is in Sakthikulangara. Sakthikulangara village and/or the old Sakthikulangara panchayat also includes the major residential areas of Moothezham, Maruthady, Valavilthope, Ozhukkuthodu, Ramankulangara, Vattakkayal, Vallikkeezhu, Poovanpuzha, Aravila, Kavanadu, Kaniyankada, Mukkadu, Venkulangara, Edamanakkavu, Kallumpuram and a few small islands in Ashtamudi lake.

== Importance ==
Sakthikulangara is a prominent place because of its proximity to the following places:

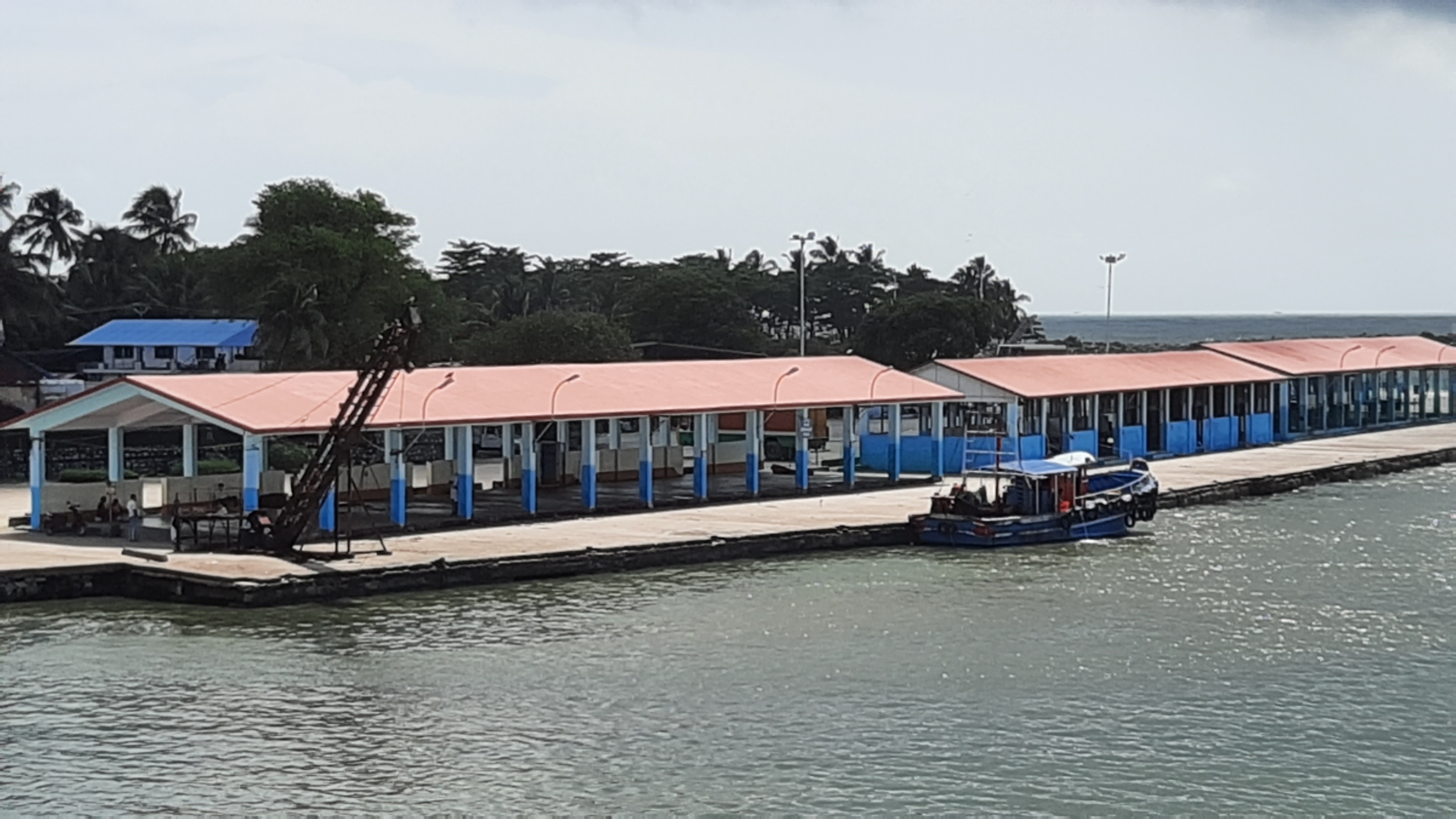
Sakthikulangara harbour during covid times

- Seafood Exporting.
- Fish landing centre.
- Boat building yards
- Sakthikulangara Mutt
- Vattakkayal
- Neendakara Fishing Harbour
- Kavanad & Kollam Bypass
- Sakthikulangara Sree Dharma Shastha Temple :The temple is famous for its festival in 'Makaram' month.
- St John De Britto Church
- Sakthikulangara - Neendakara Bridge
- St.Joseph’s High School
- Lakeford School

Sakthikulangara village owes its transformation from a sleepy village to present fishing industry powerhouse to Indo–Norwegian project. Indo-Norwegian Project was Norway's first foreign aid development project.

The project was first established in Neendakara, near Quilon, Kerala in 1953, and the aim was modernisation of fisheries of Kerala, but also improvement of health, sanitation and water supply.

== See also ==
- Kollam
- Kollam Port
- Kollam district
- Kollam Junction
- Kollam Beach
- Paravur

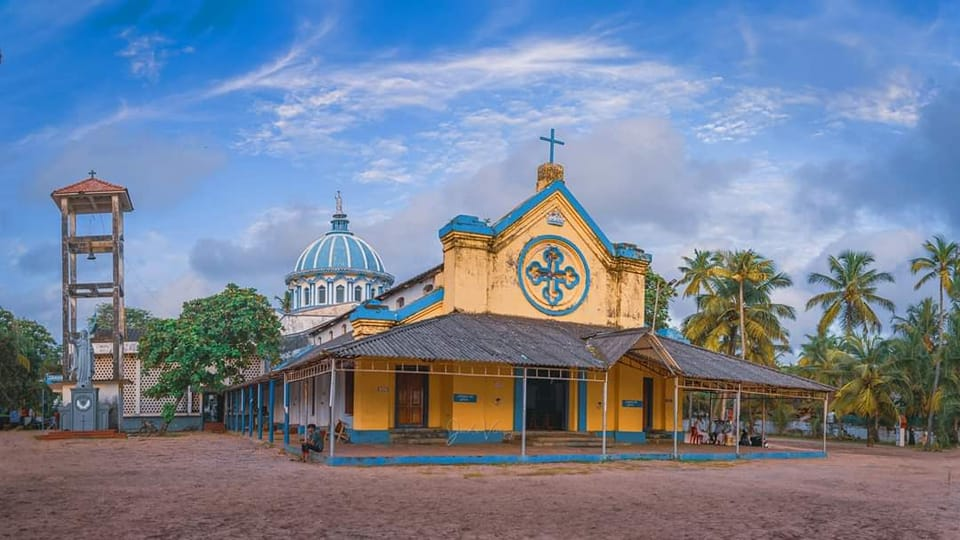
St John De Britto Church

== St John De Britto Church ==
St. John de Britto’s Church, Sakthikulangara, was established in the year 1878 by Rt. Rev. Ildaphonsa Borgna Vicar Apostolic. The church is demolished and constructing a new one.

Located 7 km north of Kollam city, Kerala –Sakthikulangara is a landmass that is almost sandwiched between the Arabian sea on the west and the Ashtamudy lake on the northern and eastern side The landscape is almost split by the National Highway 66 Ozhukkuthode, a flowing rivulet, on the southern border and Kattackal lake on the eastern side provide the land strip a rare mix of environmental charm. The estuary where Ashtamudy lake pours into Arabian sea touches the northern side of the land strip, making it a natural harbor. The estuary where Ashtamudi lake confluence with the Arabian sea separate Sakthikulangara from Neendakara. The faithful community was a part of the Neendakara Parish till 1878.

At first the Catholic population in Thekkakara (Sakthikulangara) was only about 300. Considering the rapid growth of faithful it was Bishop Benziger who declared Sakthikulangara as a separate parish in 1909. The existing Church was extended and renovated, in the model of St. Peter’s Basilica under the leadership of Rt. Ret. Msgr. Valerian Fernandez and was blessed on 01 January, 1971 by Bishop Jerome.

In the 1950s when the coastline of Kerala hardly had any motorized boats, and processing facilities, a survey done by the Central Government with the aid of Norway chose the village of Sakthikulangara and some surrounding areas to set the Indo Norwegian project in India. It was mainly siting the hardworking and dedication of the people in Sakthikulangara that the gamechanger project was implemented in this area. Today, Sakthikulangara has one of the major fishing harbor in Kerala where mechanized fishing operation using trawlers, freezing and export thrive making the state itself one of the top foreign money gainer in exports.

To cater to the needs of the growing faithful community in Puthenthuruthu, an island surrounded by Ashtamudi Lake which is a part of the Sakthikulangara Parish where more than 100 families reside in the year 2009, September 6th a chapel in honor of “Our Lady of Assumption” was blessed by Rt. Rev. Dr. Stanley Roman, Bishop of Kollam.

The southern border of the Parish know as Valavilthoppe is also facilitated with a chapel in honor of “St. Joseph” which accommodates more than 500 faithful at a time. The Chappel was blessed in the year 2009, September 6th by Rev. Dr. Stanly Roman.

The towering Sagara Matha Shrine by the side of the national highway is another center for devotion and prayer in the parish.

Currently with more than 2900 families Sakthikulangara is the largest Roman Catholic Parish in the Diocese of Quilon

≈

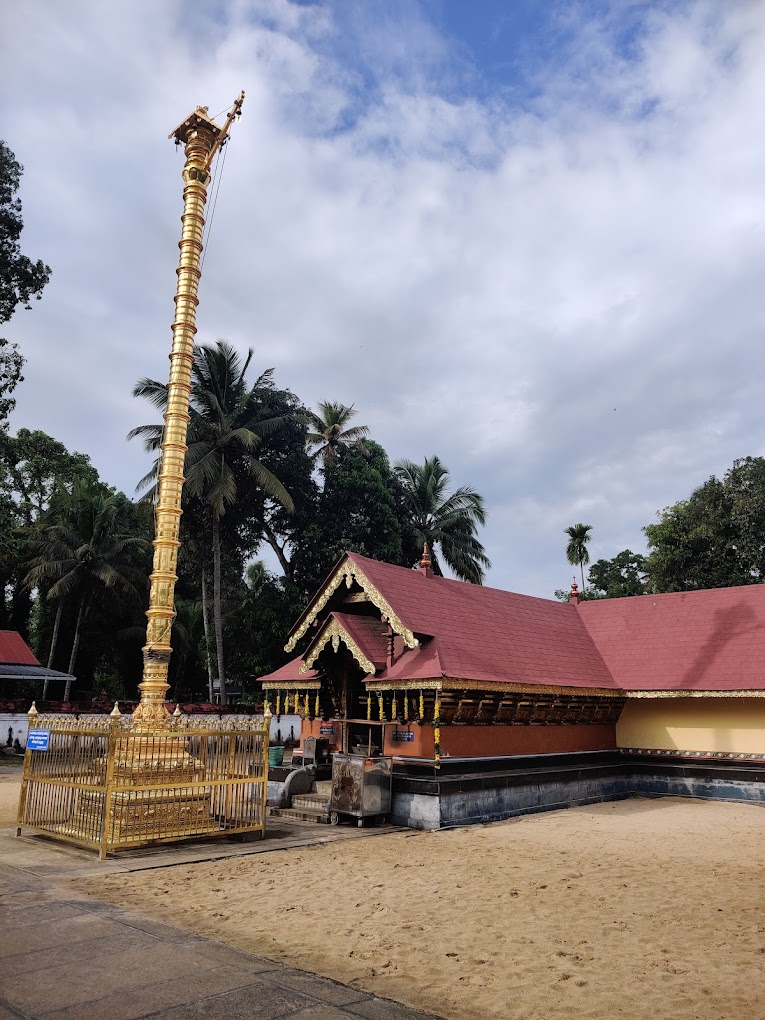

== Sakthikulangara Sree Dharma Shasta Temple ==
A popular legend about the origin of the name Sakthikulangara is related to the foundation of the Sree Dharma Sastha Temple. A Brahmin, a great Vedic scholar, who was returning from attending the Murajapam at the Thiruvananthapuram Sri Padmanabhaswamy Temple, came down to take a bath in the pond near the temple. The things that he had were kept in the pond. He was about to leave after bathing and when he tried to take his things kept in the pond, the Salagrama which has been with him since the time of his ancestors, was so fixed to the bank of the pool that he could not lift it. Realising the power inside the Salagrama he said "Sakthi kulakarayilo" Hence the name was derived as Sakthikulangara for the place. (Sakthi means power and 'kulangara' means the bank of the pool). Then the locals who gathered there were asked to build a temple for the deity who had fixed iron at the Kulakara.

Sree Dharma Sastha is believed to be the ‘Saving God’ of four communities: Sakthikulangara Cherry, Kannimel Cherry, Kureepuzha Cherry and Meenathu Cherry. Sree Dharma Shastha in this temple is affectionately called " Kunchachaman "

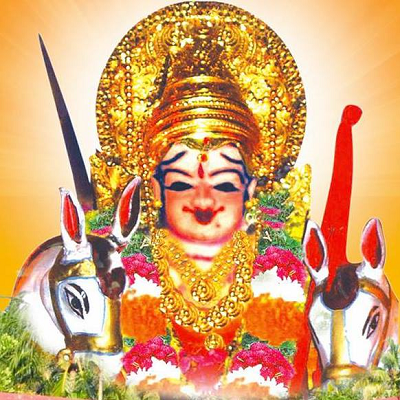
Sakthikulangara Sree Dharma Shasta ( Kunchachaman)

.

The temple is believed to be one of the 108 Ayyappan Kavu temples in Kerala. The Sakthikulangara Dharma Sastha Temple-Sree Ayyappa Swamy Temple is known for its Utsavam in the Uthram starMalayalam month of Makaram (between mid-January and mid-February).
