= List of neighbourhoods of Kollam =

Kollam or Quilon is a thickly populated city in Kerala, India. It is home to a population of more than 3.5 Lakh (350,000) people. Kollam is a microcosm of Kerala and its residents belong to varied religious, ethnic and linguistic groups. A good number of Anglo-Indians, Gujaratis, Kutchi Memon & Tamilians are residing in Kollam city. The city is having a density of 6199/km^{2}, which is second highest in Kerala. Kollam Metropolitan Area is having a population of 11.10 Lakh. In terms of economic performance and per capita income, Kollam city is in 5th position among the Indian cities and 3rd in Kerala behind Kochi and Kannur.

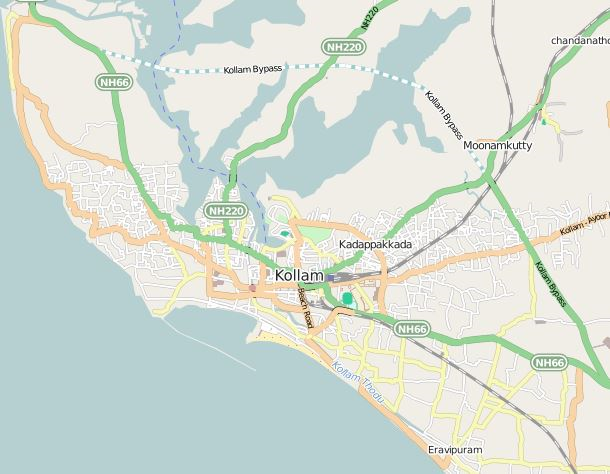
Map of Kollam city

== North Kollam ==
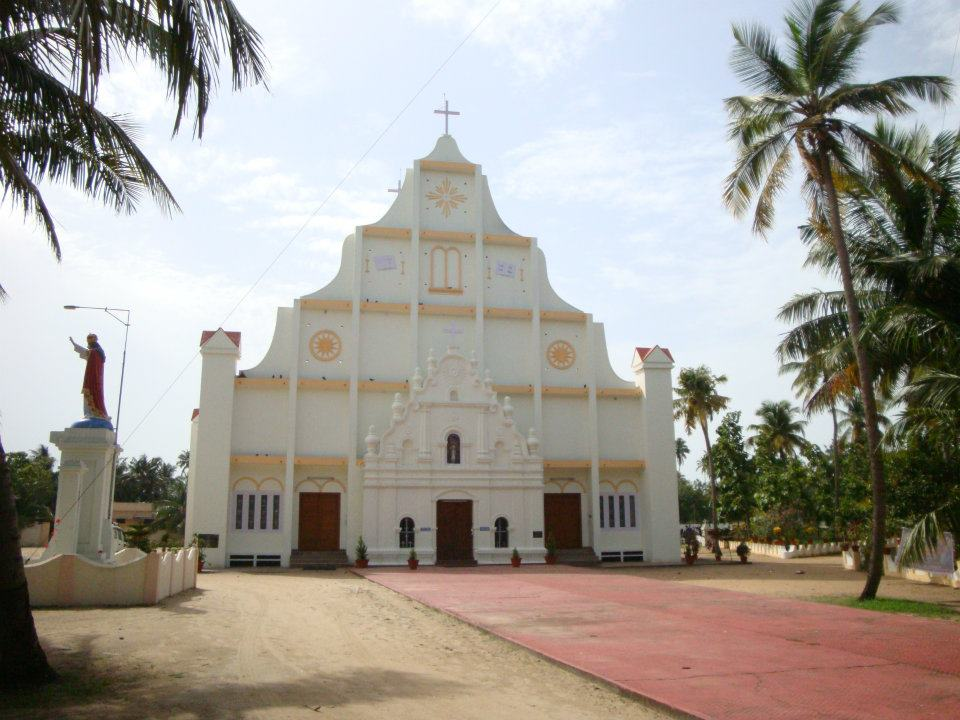
St.Sebastians Church at Neendakara

- Kannimel
- Kavanad
- Kureepuzha
- Maruthadi
- Meenathucheri
- Neendakara
- Punnathala
- Ramankulangara
- Sakthikulangara
- Thirumullavaram
- Vallikeezhu
- Vattakayal

== Central Kollam ==
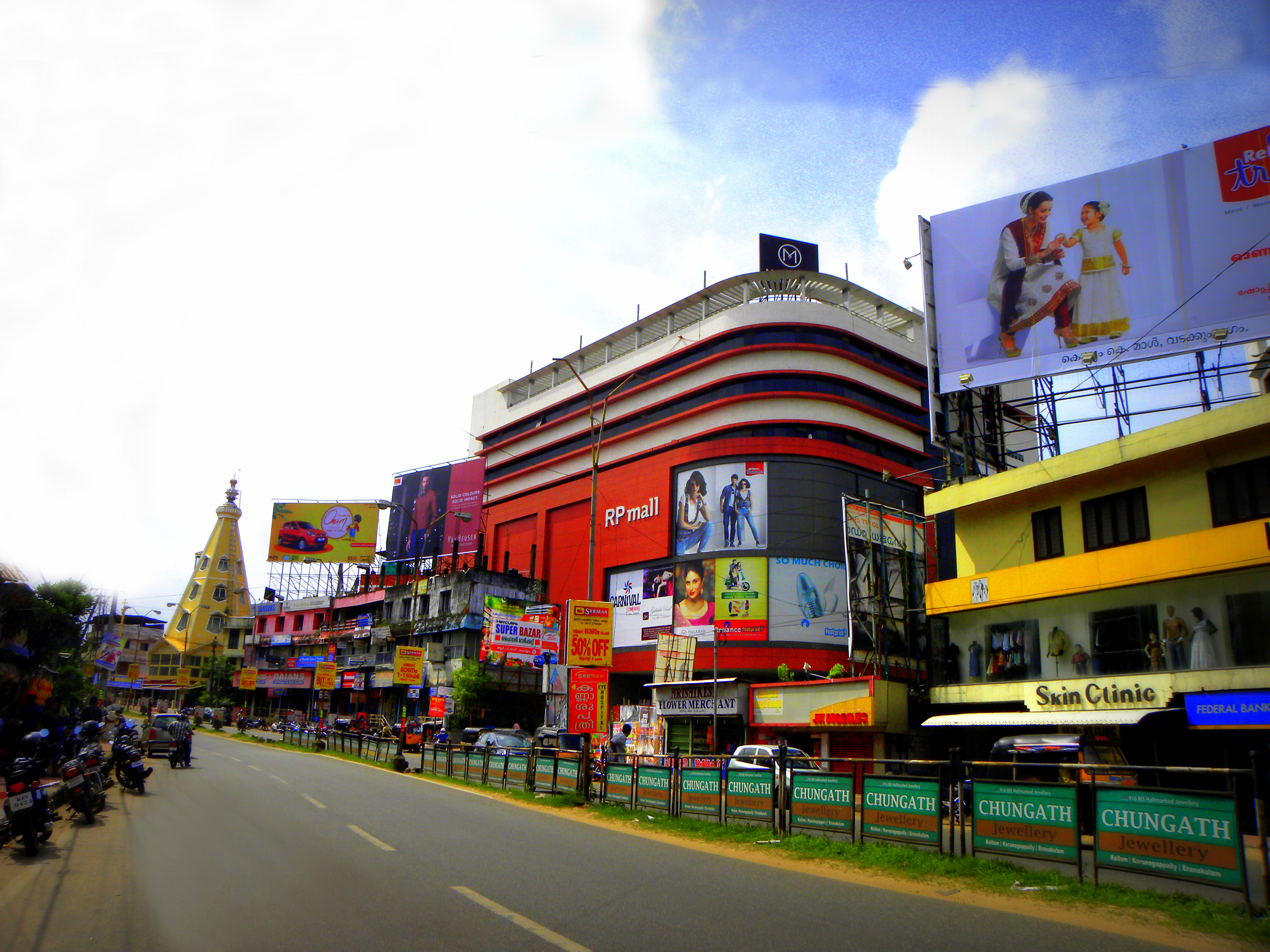
A snap of RP Mall in Downtown Kollam area

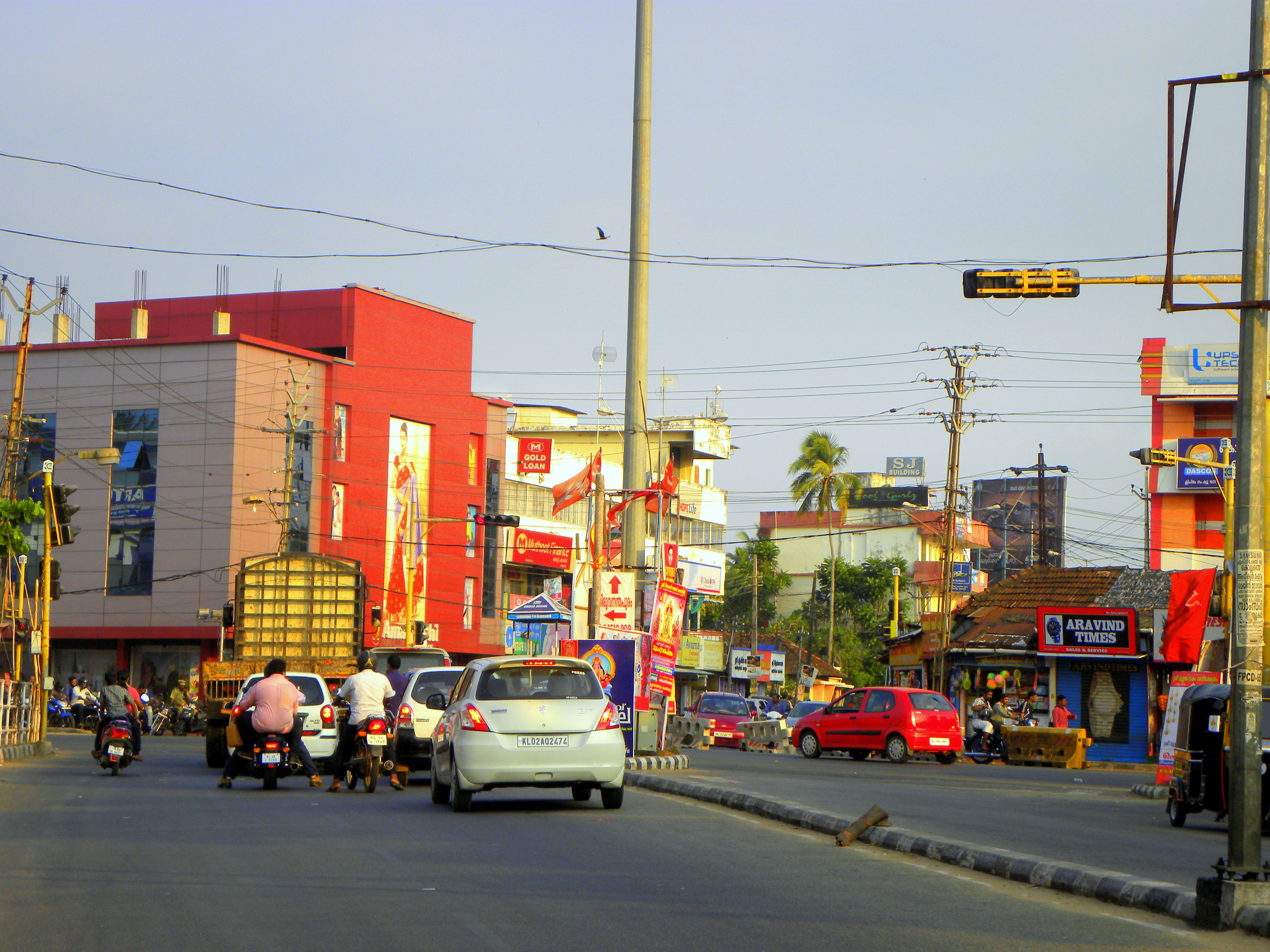
Kadappakada Junction

- Andamukkam
- Asramam
- Chamakada
- Chinnakada
- Cutchery
- Kadappakada
- Kaikulangara
- Karbala
- Kochupilamoodu
- Cantonment
- Kottukadu
- Mathilil
- Mulamkadakam
- Pattathanam
- Polayathode
- Punnathanam
- Thevally
- Thoppilkadavu
- Udayamarthandapuram
- Uliyakovil
- Vadakkumbhagam

== West Kollam ==
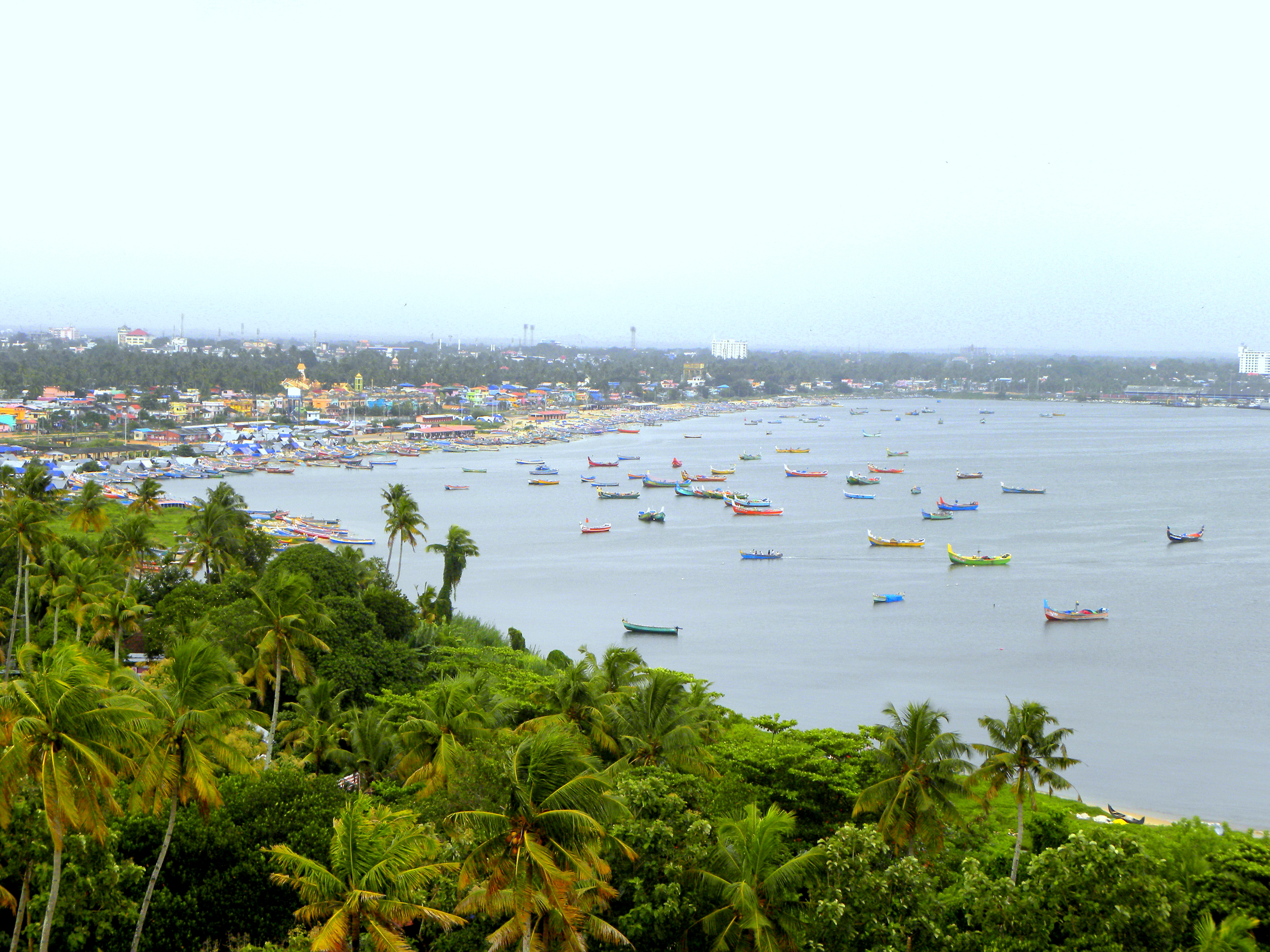
Aerial view of Thangassery Harbour Area

- Jonakapuram
- Kallupalam
- Kaval
- Mulakkada
- Paikkada
- Pallithottam
- Port Kollam
- Tangasseri
- Thamarakulam
- Vady

== East Kollam ==
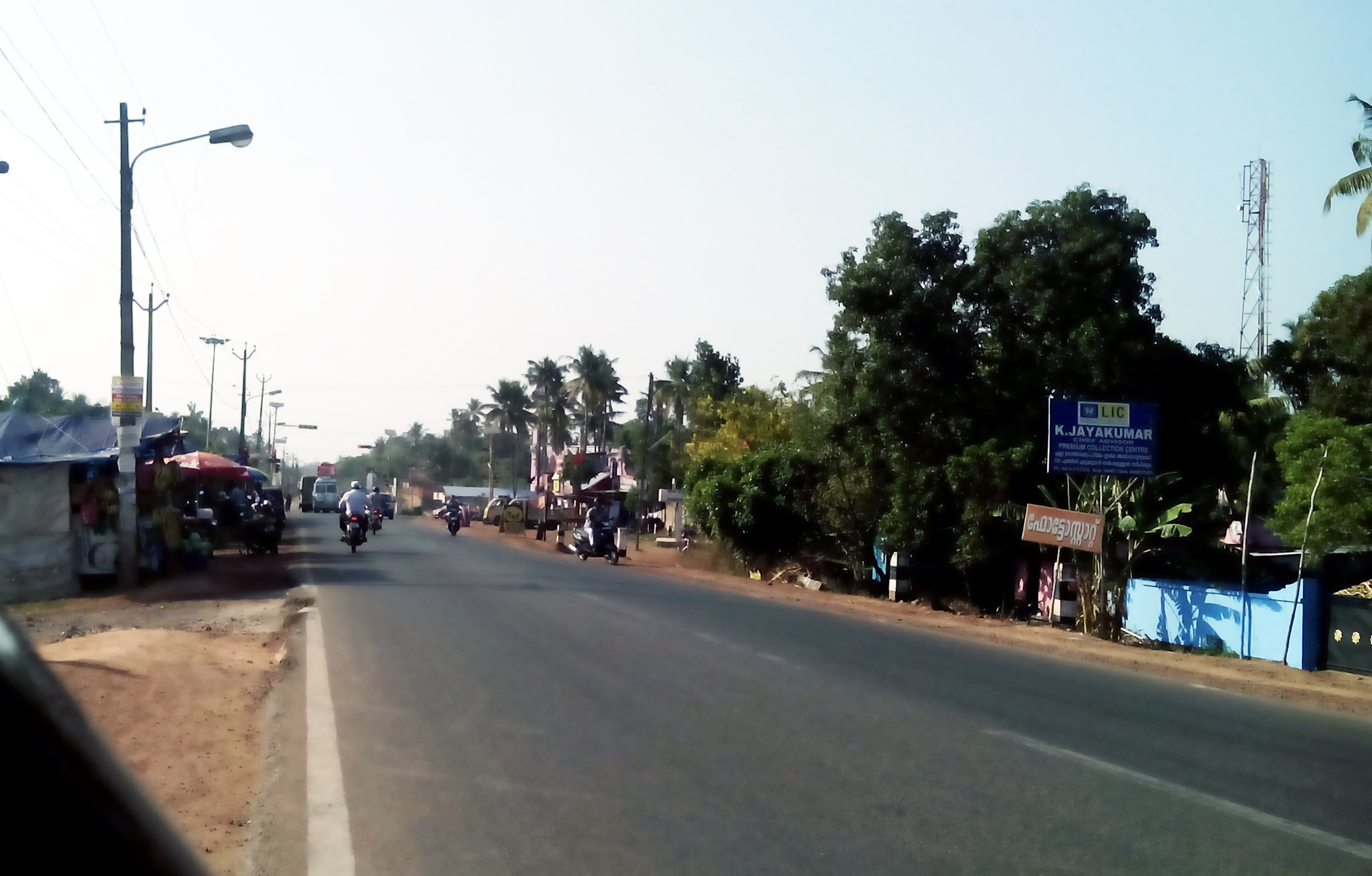
Kollam Bypass at Ayathil

- Arunoottimangalam
- Ayathil
- Chandanathoppe
- Chathinamkulam
- Kallumthazham
- Karikkodu
- Kilikollur
- Koikkal
- Manakkadu
- Mangadu
- Mulluvila
- Palakkadavu
- Palathara
- Palkulangara
- Pullikada
- Punthalathazham

== South Kollam ==
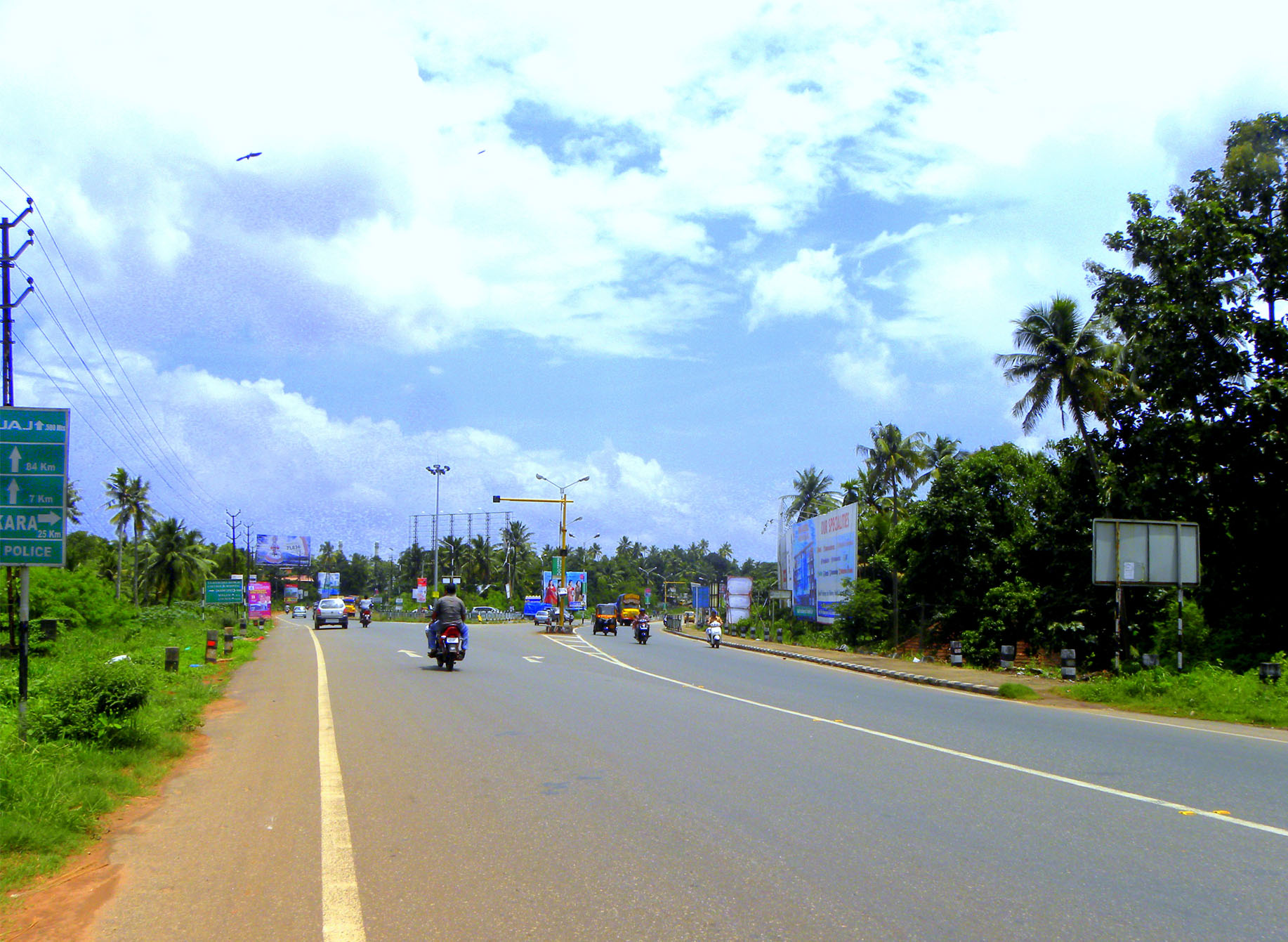
Kollam Bypass at Mevaram

- Akkolil
- Eravipuram
- Kayyalakkal
- Kollurvila
- Koottikkada
- Madannada
- Mevaram
- Pallimukku
- Thattamala
- Thekkevila
- Thekkumbhagam
- Vadakkevila
- Valathungal
