= 2020 Kollam Municipal Corporation election =

- 8 December 2020

All 55 councils in the Kollam City Corporation 28 seats needed for a majority
- Turnout: 66.06% (▼3.54%)
	First party	Second party	Third party
	CPI(M)	INC	BJP
Party	Communist Party of India (Marxist)	Indian National Congress	Bharatiya Janata Party
Alliance	LDF	UDF	NDA
Last election	36	16	2
Seats won	39	14	6
Seat change	3▲	7▼	4▲
Popular vote	85,205	61,998	44,934
Percentage	41.75%	30.38%	22.02%
Swing	2.23%▲	2.08%▼	3.16%▲
Elected Mayor
Prasanna Earnest
CPI(M)

The 5th Kollam Municipal Corporation council election was held on 8 December 2020 and the result announced on 16 December. LDF won 39 seats, UDF fronts won 9 seats, NDA won 6 seats and others won 1 seat. CPI(M) lead LDF won the majority to rule

== History ==
Kollam became the fourth municipal corporation of Kerala in the year 2000. Since the inception, only LDF ruled the corporation.

=== Election history ===
Since the incorporation of the KMC in 2000, only the LDF has been in power.

Year of election	Cast votes	Polling %	LDF	UDF	NDA	Others	Total seats	Winner	Source
2020	2,04,058	66.06%	39	9	6	1	55	LDF	
2015	1,98,871	69.9%	36	16	2	1	55	LDF	
2010	NA	NA	34	19	0	2	55	LDF	
2005	NA	NA	36	10	0	6	52	LDF	
2000	NA	NA	25	20	0	5	50	LDF	

== Background ==
The tenure of the members of the municipal corporation of Kollam ended on early November 2020. As per the voters list published in 2020 November, there were around 2,88,804 eligible voters (1,38,820 male voters, 1,49,984 female voters) in which 2,04,058 cast their votes through 265 polling stations in the corporation area. The total polling rate was 66.06%.

Details of voters in Kollam for the municipal corporation election 2020
Group of voters	Voters population	Cast votes
Male	1,38,820	NA
Female	1,49,984	NA
Third Gender	0	0
Total Voters	2,88,804	2,04,058

There were 55 wards with one polling booth in each ward. The vote counting station in the municipality was Government Boys HSS, Thevally.

Councils in Kollam City Corporation
Maruthadi	Sakthikulangara	Meenathucheri	Kavanad	Vallikeezhu
Kureepuzha West	Kureepuzha	neeravil	Anchalummoodu	Kadavoor
Mathili	Thevally	Vadakkumbhagam	Asramam	Uliyakkovil
Uliyakkovil East	Koyikkal	Kadappakkada	Kallumthazham	Mangadu
Arunoottimangalam	Cthathinamkulam	Karicode	College	Palkulangara
Ammannada	Vadakkevila	Pallimukku	Ayathil	Kilikollur
Punthalathazham	Palathara	Manacadu	Kolloorvila	Kayyalakkal
Valathungal	Akkolil	Thekkumbhagom	Eravipuram	Bharanikkavu
Thekkevila	Mundakkal	Pattathanam	Cantonment	Udayamarthandapuram
Thamarakkulam	Pallithottam	Port	Cutchery	Kaikkulangara
Tangasseri	Thirumullavaram	Mulangadakam	Alattukavu	Kannimel

== Parties and coalitions ==
There are two major political coalitions in Kollam corporation. The Left Democratic Front (LDF) is the coalition of left wing and far-left parties, led by the Communist Party of India (Marxist) (CPI(M)). The United Democratic Front (UDF) is the coalition of centrist and centre-left parties led by the Indian National Congress. The third front is led by Bharatiya Janata Party.

=== Left Democratic Front ===
Party	Flag	Symbol	Leader	Seats contested	Male	Female
Communist Party of India (Marxist)			Devarajan	NA	NA	NA
Communist Party of India			--	NA	NA	NA

=== United Democratic Front ===
Party	Flag	Symbol	Leader	Seats contested	Male	Female
Indian National Congress			NA	NA	NA	NA
Revolutionary Socialist Party			--	NA	NA	NA
Indian Union Muslim League				NA	NA	NA

=== National Democratic Alliance ===
Party	Flag	Symbol	Leader	Seats contested	Male	Female
Bharatiya Janata Party			NA	NA	NA	NA

=== Vote share by alliances ===
Coalition	2015	2020
LDF	78,594 (39.52%)	85,205 (41.75%)
UDF	64,559 (32.46%)	61,998 (30.38%)
NDA	37,511 (18.86%)	44,934 (22.02%)
Others	18,207 (9.15%)	11921 (5.84%)
Total	1,98,871	2,04,058

== Results ==
Vote Share by alliance
1. LDF (41.8%)
2. UDF (30.4%)
3. NDA (22.0%)
4. 5.84%
5. Other (0.01%)

=== By alliance ===
LDF	SEATS	UDF	SEATS	NDA	SEATS	OTHER	SEATS
CPI(M)	29	INC	6	BJP	6	SDPI	1
CPI	10	RSP	3	--	--	IND	0
Total	39	Total	9	Total	6	Total	1
Change	+2	Change	-6	Change	+4	Change	--

In bypoll held later RSP gained one seat and CPI(M) lost one.

=== Results by Ward ===
No.	Ward	Councillor	Party	Votes	Runner up	Party	Votes
1	Maruthadi	Sumi M.	INC	1929	Agnus Teacher	CPI	1713
2	Sakthikulangara	M. Pushpangadhan (Babu)	RSP	1647	Pramod (Prabhu)	BJP	1099
3	Meenathuchery (By Poll)	Raju Neelakantan	CPI(M)	1482	Deepu Gangadharan	RSP	1457
3	Meenathuchery (By Poll)	Deepu Gangadharan	RSP	2099	Sandhya Raju Neelakantan	CPI(M)	1465
4	Kavanad	Kollam Madhu	CPI	1040	Viju S Murari	BJP	910
5	Vallikeezhu	S. Jayan	CPI(M)	1768	Deepa Sahadevan	BJP	821
6	Kureepuzha West	Sreelatha	CPI(M)	2009	Sangeetha Binu	BJP	1256
7	Kureepuzha	Girija Thulasi	CPI(M)	1899	Deviprabha U.R.	INC	1647
8	Neeravil	Sindhurani	CPI(M)	1996	T.S. Sunitha	INC	1824
9	Anchalumoodu	S. Swarnamma	RSP	2358	M. Kamaladevi	RSP (LM)	1737
10	Kadavoor	Girija Santhosh	CPI	1908	K.R. Mani	INC	1516
11	Mathilil	Tylus Thomas (Suma)	RSP	1242	Aneeta Vijayan	CPI(M)	1121
12	Thevally	B. Shylaja	BJP	1430	Rajmohanan	CPI(M)	961
13	Vadakkumbhagam	Honey Benjamin	CPI	1388	Sali Thomas	INC	979
14	Asramam	Sajithanand Teacher	BJP	1232	Rejitha V	CPI(M)	1012
15	Uliyakovil	Abhilash T.R.	BJP	1533	Uliyakovil Sasi	CPI	1297
16	Uliyakovil East	Ambili	CPI(M)	1578	Moncy Das	BJP	1061
17	Kadappakada	Kripa Vinod	BJP	1328	Kavitha	CPI	958
18	Koyikkal	Santhosh	CPI(M)	1599	S. Sreekumar	INC	1053
19	Kallumthazham	Sabu B.	CPI	1429	Satheeshkumar	IND	945
20	Mangadu	TG Gireesh	BJP	1039	Murukadas	RSP	982
21	Arunnoottimangalam	Asha Biju	CPI(M)	2048	Anithakumari	KC (Jacob)	1125
22	Chathinamkulam	Krishnendhu	SDPI	1673	Sani	BJP	1581
23	Karicode	Sujakrishnan	CPI(M)	1812	Chinnumol R.	INC	1448
24	College	S. Geethakumari	CPI(M)	2427	Santhini	BJP	1581
25	Palkulangara	Arathi S.	CPI(M)	1332	Adv. Chithrambika S.	IND	672
26	Ammannada	Prem Ushar	CPI(M)	2040	Biju B. Thushara	BJP	803
27	Vadakkevila	Sreedevi Amma	INC	1269	Athira Vijayan	BJP	1036
28	Pallimukku	M. Sajeev	CPI(M)	1923	N. Noushad	RSP	1884
29	Ayathil	Adv G. Udayakumar	CPI(M)	1679	Chandrabose V.	BJP	833
30	Kilikollur	A. Noushad	CPI	2061	Shiyad K.	INC	1297
31	Punthalathazham	V. Praji	CPI	1281	S. Bindu	INC	1134
32	Palathara	A. Aneeshkumar	BJP	1535	S. Chandrabose	CPI	1336
33	Manacadu	Naseema Shihab	CPI(M)	2129	Adv. A. Reeja	IUML	1493
34	Kolloorvila	Hamzathbeevi	INC	1658	Sheheena Savad	INL	1333
35	Kayyalakkal	Mehrunissa M	CPI(M)	1947	Majida Wahab	IUML	1935
36	Valathungal	Suja	CPI	1815	M. Kamaludeen	IUML	874
37	Akkolil	Maya S. Balu	CPI(M)	1579	Mini S.	INC	1352
38	Thekkumbhagam	Sunil Jose	INC	2016	Wilfred Simon	CPI(M)	1193
39	Eravipuram	V.S. Priyadarshan	CPI(M)	1185	Saji D Anand	RSP	909
40	Bharanikkavu	S. Savitha Devi	CPI	1065	Latha	INC	872
41	Thekkevila	T.P. Abhimanyu	CPI(M)	1743	Sujith Chandran	BJP	1446
42	Mundakkal	Kuruvila Joseph	INC	1681	Sreeharshan	CPI(M)	1553
43	Pattathanam	M.H. Nizamudeen	CPI(M)	1254	Pattathanam Santhosh	INC	743
44	Cantonment	Adv. A.K. Savad	CPI(M)	1572	C.V. Anilkumar	INC	1411
45	Udayamarthandapuram	Sajeev Soman	CPI	1176	Abhishek S.	BJP	916
46	Thamarakulam	Prassanna Earnest	CPI(M)	1186	Nayanamol	INC	1005
47	Pallithottam	N. Tomy	CPI	1748	Scarbitta	IND	1209
48	Port	George D. Kattil	INC	2041	Babukumar	IND	1571
49	Cutchery	G. Somarajan	CPI(M)	1781	M.S. Lal	BJP	1500
50	Kaikulangara	Minimol G.R.	CPI(M)	1703	S. Rajendran (Kannappan)	INC	1436
51	Thangaserry	J. Stanly	CPI(M)	2451	Santhosh Alphonse	INC	1541
52	Thirumullavaram	Pavithra U.	CPI(M)	1504	Surya B Chandran	BJP	1360
53	Mulamkadakam	J. Sethulakshmi	CPI(M)	1408	Dr. Karumalil Udaya Sukumaran	INC	1057
54	Alattukavu	Asha S.	CPI(M)	1610	Manjusha Santhosh	BJP	1606
55	Kannimel	Aswathy A.	CPI(M)	2050	Teena Johnson	INC	1066

== See also ==
- Kollam Municipal Corporation
- 2020 Paravur Municipal election
