= Residency Road =

Road in Kollam, India

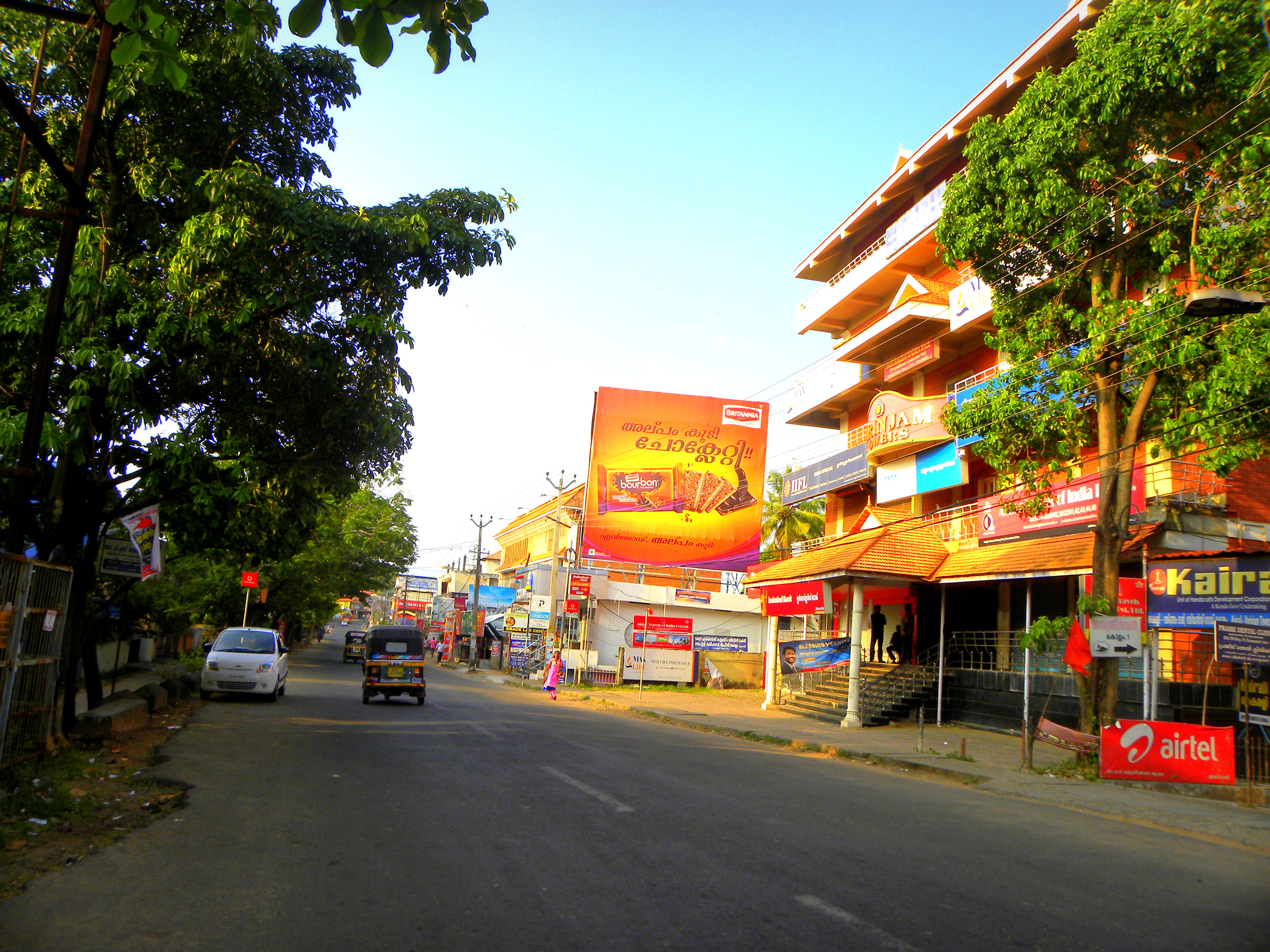
- Residency Road
- Maintained by: Kollam Municipal Corporation
- Length: 1.6 km (0.99 mi)
- South end: Chinnakada
- Major junctions: Link Road at Asramam; Muneeshwaran Kovil
- North end: British Residency

Residency Road is one of the major city roads in city of Kollam, India. The 1.6 km road starts at Chinnakada in south and ends at British Residency(Asramam Guest House) in north. The road got the name Residency Road as it ends at British Residency in the city.

== History ==
Residency road was an important city road in Kollam. The name Residency road was actually given to a road that has connected Kappalandi Mukku with British Residency, till 2010. Later in 2010, City corporation of Kollam has inaugurated Asramam Link Road and they have renamed the Kappalandi Mukku-Asramam section of road as Link Road and they re-aligned Residency road into current form.

== Major public/private institutions in Residency road ==
- LIC city branch
- Pulimootil Silks
- The Vaidya Hotel
- QRS Retail
- Sony Center
- Supplyco
- Quilon Co-operative Urban Bank
- Karnataka Bank
