= Asramam Link Road =

Road in Kollam, India

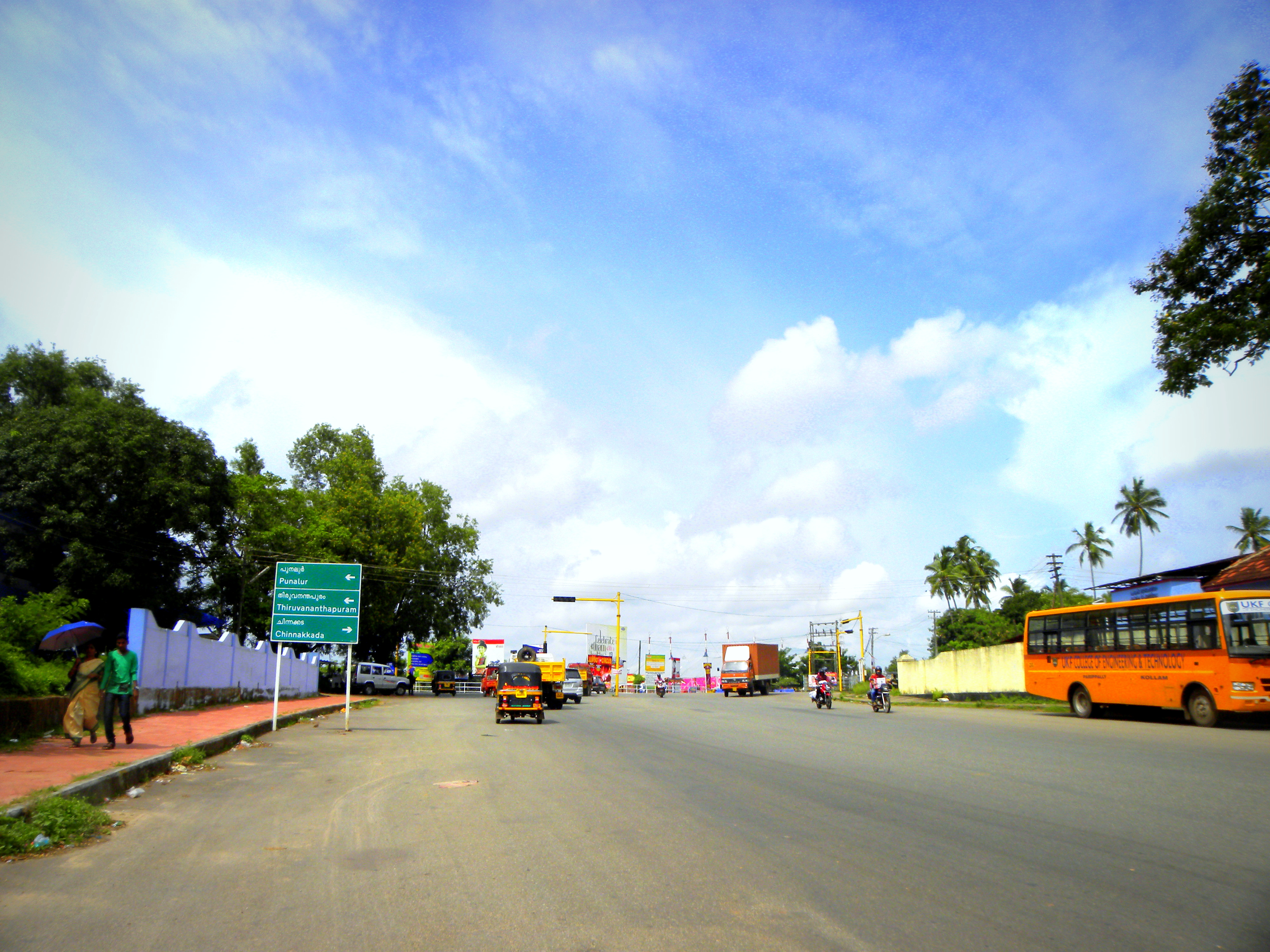
- Link road near Kollam KSRTC Bus Station

Route information
- Length: 6.1 km (3.8 mi)
- Existed: 2010–present

Major junctions
- East end: NH-66 in Kappalandimukku
- NH-744 in Kadappakada; Uliyakovil road in Asramam; NH-183 in Thevally
- West end: NH-66 in Thoppilkadavu

Location
- Country: India
- Major cities: Kollam(Quilon)

Highway system
- Roads in India; Expressways; National; State; Asian

The Asramam Link Road is an important four-lane city road in Kollam in the Indian state of Kerala. This road was formerly known as Airport Road or Aerodrome Road as it was the connection road to Kollam Airport, the one and only airport in the entire Kerala coast then. The road starts from Kappalandimukku near Polayathode in the east and currently ends at KSRTC, but is ultimately planned to extend to Thoppilkadavu in the west of the city. The Rs.114 crore worth third phase of construction includes a 3 km long flyover, which would extend it from Kollam KSRTC Bus Station to Thoppilkadavu, is going on now.

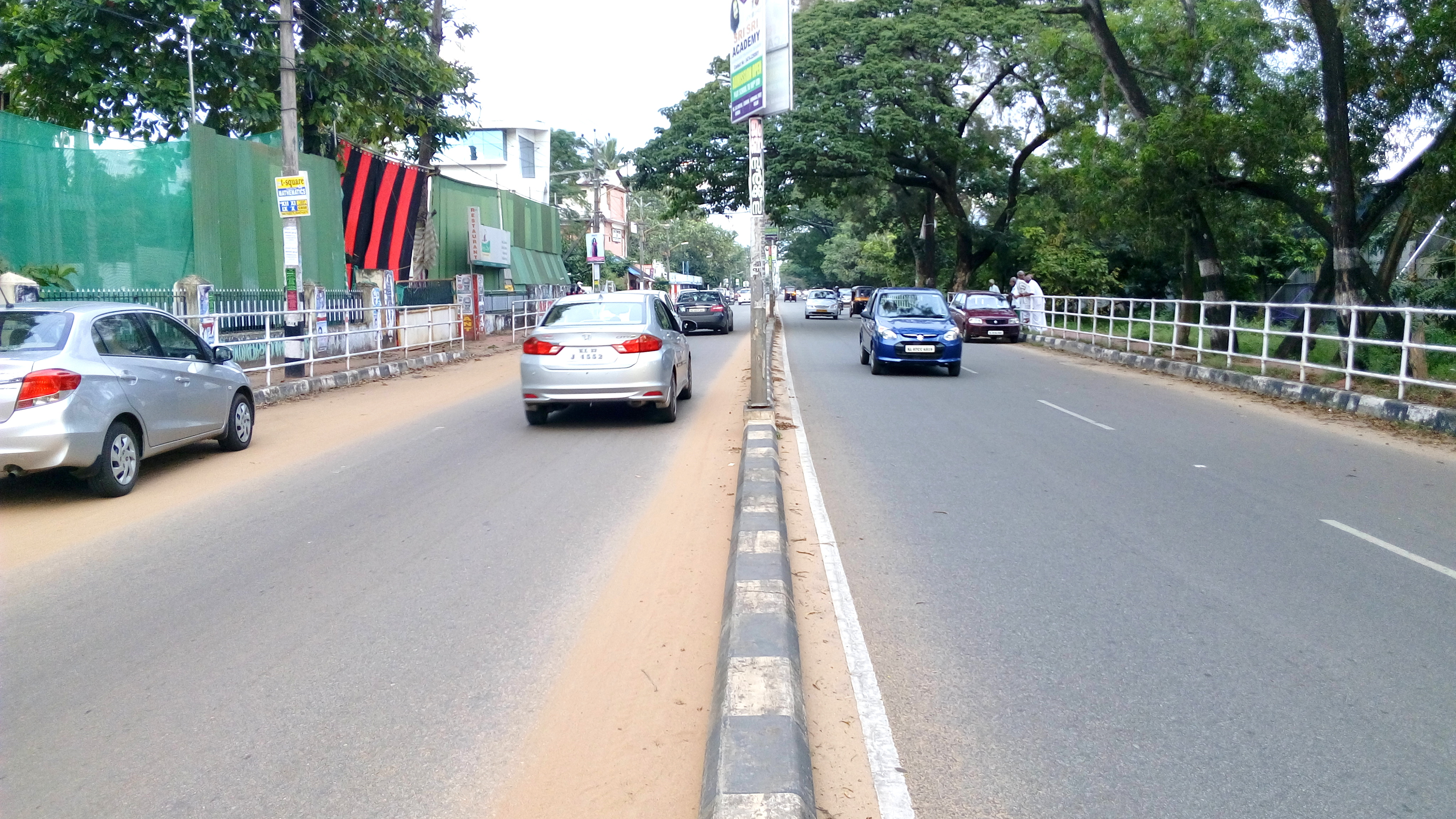
View of Asramam Link Road towards Kadappakada side

== Importance ==
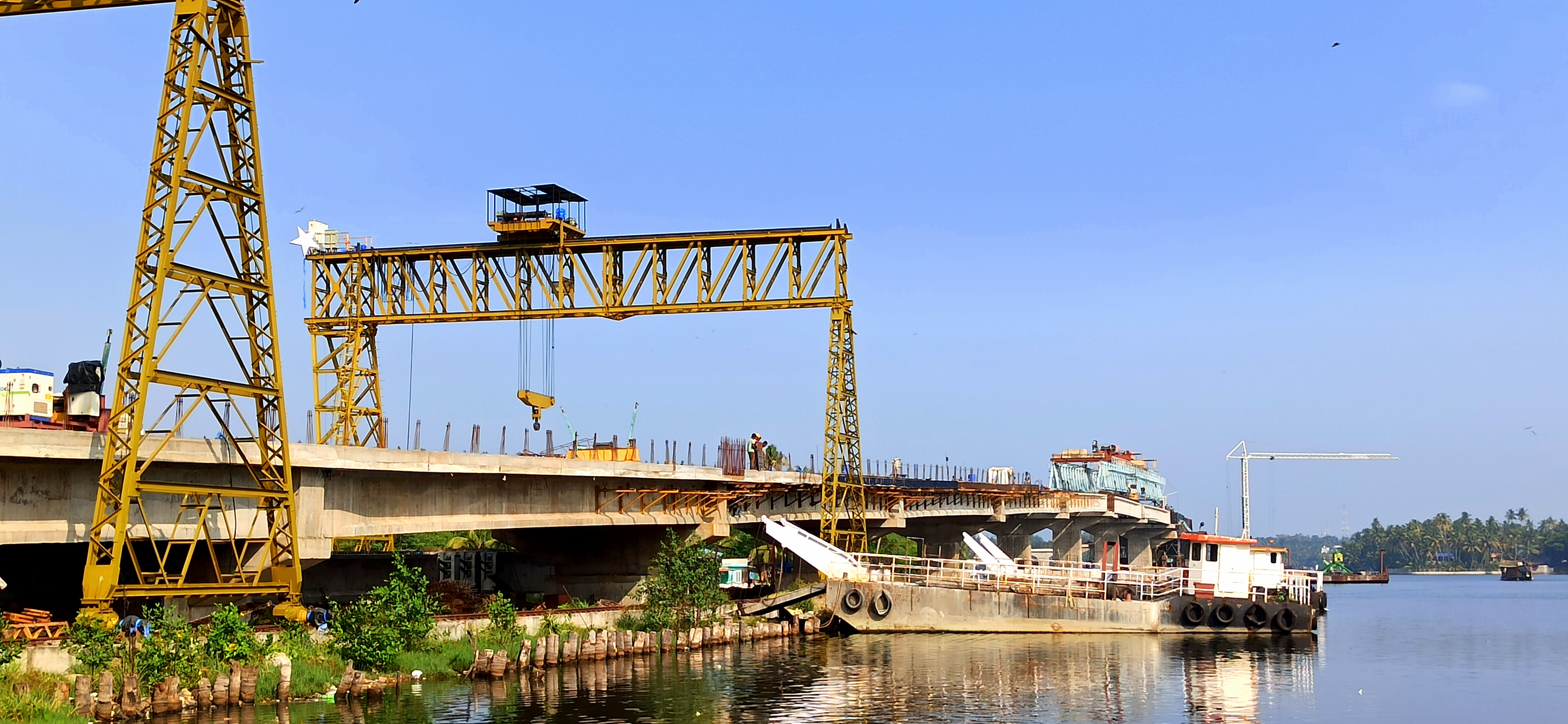
Phase-III construction works of Link Road over Ashtamudi Lake

Kollam is an old sea port city in Kerala with traffic bottlenecks in three locations: Polayathode-Thattamala, Anchalumoodu and Kottiyam. Demand existed for a new road to bypass Downtown Kollam and avoid the complex Chinnakada Junction. The Kollam Bypass project is the least funded bypass project in the state and a 9 kilometres (5.6 mi) stretch remains unfinished. This link road now serves the city as a mini bypass by avoiding the heavy traffic at Chinnakada junction. The Kollam Development Authority had approved Rs. 1.6 Crores for the project's Phase-I. The road is also included in the JnNURM Mission for Kollam city. https://www.manoramaonline.com/district-news/kollam/2025/02/10/kollam-theni-national-highway-expansion-plans.html

== Major junctions ==
Kappalandimukku → Chemmanmukku → Kadappakada → Asramam → KSRTC → Thevally → Thoppilkadavu

== See also ==
- Kollam
- Kollam Airport(Defunct)
- Asramam Maidan
- Polayathode
- Thoppilkadavu
- Kadappakada
- Kollam KSRTC Bus Station
