= Sreenarayanaguru Open University =

University in Kerala, India

Sree Narayanaguru Open University
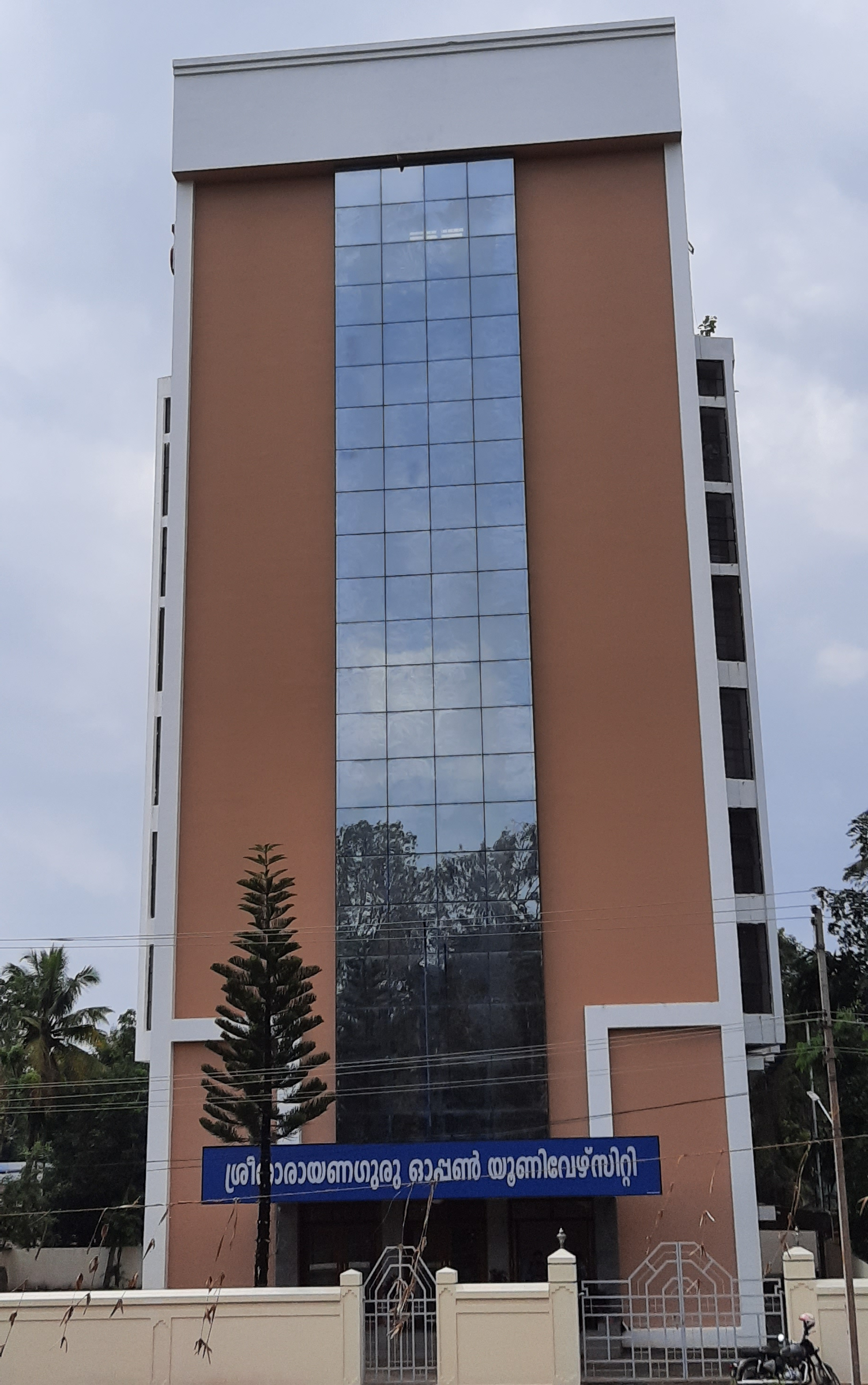
- Type: Open university
- Established: 2 October 2020; 5 years ago
- Affiliations: UGC
- Chancellor: Governor of Kerala
- Vice-Chancellor: Jagathy Raj V. P
- Pro Chancellor: Roji M John, Minister for Higher Education, Government of Kerala
- Students: 50,000
- Location: University Building, Kureepuzha, Kollam, Kerala, 691601, India; 8.9212467°N 76.5680963°E
- Campus: Urban
- Website: sgou.ac.in

Sreenarayanaguru Open University (SGOU) is a state open university located in Kollam, Kerala, established in 2020 by The Sreenarayanaguru Open University Act, 2021 (Kerala Act No 1 of 2021). The first open university in Kerala, it was approved by the University Grants Commission (UGC) in 2021.

The establishment of the university aimed to unify all the distance education courses offered by various state-run universities, such as the Kannur University, Mahatma Gandhi University, University of Calicut, and University of Kerala, into a single university. However, University of Calicut and University of Kerala continues to provide distance education for programmes that are not provided by SGOU.

== History ==
The university was established by the promulgation of an 45th Ordinance of 2020 to that effect by Governor of Kerala on 25 September 2020 and was inaugurated by Pinarayi Vijayan, chief minister of Kerala, on 2 October 2020 in a function held at Kollam. The university has been named after Narayana Guru and has its headquarters at Kureepuzha in Kollam. P M Mubarak Pasha was appointed as the first vice-chancellor and S V Sudheer as the first pro-vice-chancellor of the university. The university was approved by the University Grants Commission (UGC) in 2021.

In November 2022, the Kerala government amended the Act to permit state public universities to offer open and distance learning programmes not provided by the SGOU. This amendment followed a 2022 interim order from the Kerala High Court, which had prohibited the University of Calicut and the University of Kerala from offering programs already available through SGOU. After the order, these universities began offering non-overlapping programmes. In 2023, the Kerala High Court reaffirmed its initial order.

=== New headquarters ===
The Finance department of the Pinarayi Vijayan lead LDF Government sanctioned ₹26.02 crore (US$2.7 million) to acquire 8.06665 acres of land in Mundakkal, Kollam city on 3 January 2025. The registration of the land completed on 29 March 2025. Steps have also been taken to provide the university with 9.5 acres of government land adjacent to this. NIT Calicut will prepare a master plan for the construction of an area of 60,000 sqft (3 buildings of 20,000 sqft) in the first phase.

The government envisions the following facilities at the university headquarters upon completion:

- Academic Block Training Center
- Virtual Studio Production Unit
- Campus Library
- Academic School and Research Centers
- Sree Narayana Guru Renaissance Museum
- Sports and Entertainment Facilities
- Botanical garden
- Auditorium and Theater
- Residential Complexes for faculties and Staffs
- Students Hospital
- Recreation Center
- Canteen
- Visitor Gallery
- Rest House

== Schools of study ==
The university shall have the following schools of study:

1. School of Humanities and Social Sciences
2. School of Sciences
3. School of Languages
4. School of Law, Business Studies and Development Studies
5. School of Communications and Information Sciences
6. School of Interdisciplinary, Multi disciplinary and Transdisciplinary Studies
7. School of Vocational Education and Training
