= 2020 Paravur Municipal Council election =

2020 Paravur Municipal election
- 8 December 2020

All 32 councils in the Paravur Municipality 17 seats needed for a majority
- Turnout: 73.07% (▼3.16%)
	First party	Second party	Third party
	CPI(M)	INC	BJP
Party	CPI(M)	INC	BJP
Alliance	LDF	UDF	NDA
Last election	18	11	3
Seats won	14	14	4
Seat change	4▼	3▲	1▲
Popular vote	9,603	7,451	4,772
Percentage	41.91%	32.52%	20.82%
Municipal Chairman before election
K. P. Kurup
CPI(M)
Elected Municipal Chairman
P.Sreeja
INC

The 8th Paravur Municipal council election was held on 8 December 2020 and the result announced on 16 December. Both LDF and UDF fronts won 14 seats each and NDA won 4 seats. The result declared as Hung because none of the fronts got the minimum seats to rule

== History ==
Paravur was one of the 4 panchayaths initially formed in the erstwhile Travancore state. It was formed in the year 1937 along with Nedumangad, Perumbavoor, Boothapandi(now in Tamilnadu). The first panchayath election held in 1942. There was only one ward in Paravur then. In 1953, Paravur panchayath bifurcated and formed Poothakkulam panchayath from it. Later in 1985, Paravur upgraded as a municipality.

=== Election history ===
Year of election	Cast votes	Polling rate	LDF	UDF	NDA	Others	Total seats	Winner
2020	22,912	73.07	14	14	4	0	32	Hung
2015	20,903	76.23	17	10	3	2	32	LDF
2010	NA	NA	15	16	1	0	32	Hung

== Background ==
The tenure of the members of the municipal council of Paravur ended on early November 2020. As per the voters list published in 2020 November, there were around 31,358 eligible voters (14,140 male voters, 17,218 female voters) in which 22,912 (10,002 male voters and 12,910 female voters) cast their votes through 32 polling stations in the municipal area. The total polling rate was 73.07%.

Details of voters in Paravur for the municipal election 2020
Group of voters	Voters population	Cast votes
Male	14,140	10,002
Female	17,218	12,910
Third Gender	0	0
Total Voters	31,358	22,912

There were 32 wards with one polling booth in each ward. The vote counting station in the municipality is Kottapuram Government LP School.

Councils in Paravur Municipality
Perumpuzha	Vinayakar	Nedungolam	Parayilkavu
Kochalummoodu	Pashumon	Ayiravilly	Peraal
Ollal	Krishibhavan	Market	Town
Aattinpuram	Puthiyidam	Kottamoola	Nerukadavu
Thekkumbhagam	Puthiyakavu	Vadakkumbhagam	Kurandikulam
Chillaykkal	Pozhikkara	Anchal Office	Maniyankulam
Kurumandal	Puttingal	Railway Station	Punjirakkulam
Kallumkunnu	Mangakunnu	Pukkulam	Yakshikkavu

== Parties and coalitions ==
There are two major political coalitions in Paravur. The Left Democratic Front (LDF) is the coalition of left wing and far-left parties, led by the Communist Party of India (Marxist) (CPI(M)). The United Democratic Front (UDF) is the coalition of centrist and centre-left parties led by the Indian National Congress.

=== Left Democratic Front ===
Party	Flag	Symbol	Leader	Seats contested	Male	Female
Communist Party of India (Marxist)			K. P. Kurup	26	10	16
Communist Party of India			--	6	2	4

=== United Democratic Front ===
Party	Flag	Symbol	Leader	Seats contested	Male	Female
Indian National Congress			Paravur Mohandas	28	13	15
Revolutionary Socialist Party			--	2	0	2
Indian Union Muslim League				1	1	0

=== National Democratic Alliance ===
Party	Flag	Symbol	Leader	Seats contested	Male	Female
Bharatiya Janata Party			Mylakkal Ashokan	31	12	19

== Results ==
=== Ward-wise ===
Ward No.	Ward	LDF candidate	Party	Votes	UDF candidate	Party	Votes	NDA candidate	Party	Votes	Winner	Margin	Winning party	Winning Alliance
01	Perumpuzha	Sabu.G	CPI(M)	234	Vijay R.S	Indian National Congress	303	Pradeep Kumar	BJP	98	Vijay R.S	69	Indian National Congress	UDF
02	Vinayakar	G.Suresh babu	CPI(M)	325	R.Jayanadh	Indian National Congress	172	R.Gopalakrishna Pillai	BJP	156	G.Suresh babu	153	CPI (M)	LDF
03	Nedumgolam	V.Ambika	CPI(M)	276	Manikrishnan	Indian National Congress	226	Sindhu Sudheer	BJP	92	V.Ambika	50	CPI (M)	LDF
04	Parayilkavu	Manju Vijayachandran	CPI(M)	421	Sheeja Hrishikesh	Indian National Congress	87	Manju Parayilkavu	BJP	285	Manju Vijayachandran	136	CPI (M)	LDF
05	Kochalummood	N.Rajeev	CPI(M)	450	N.Reghu	Indian National Congress	195	Chithralekha C.S	BJP	287	N.Rajeev	163	CPI (M)	LDF
06	Pashuman	B.Ashok Kumar	CPI(M)	521	Adv.B.Ajith	Indian National Congress	59	V.Ashokan	BJP	159	B.Ashok Kumar	362	CPI (M)	LDF
07	Ayiravilli	T.C Raju	CPI(M)	326	Jayashankar Bhaskar	Indian National Congress	149	Madhusoodanan	BJP	86	T.C Raju	177	CPI (M)	LDF
08	Peraal	L.Deepa	CPI(M)	457	Biji Balachandran	Indian National Congress	132	Sajitha Surendran	BJP	196	L.Deepa	261	CPI (M)	LDF
09	Ollal	Jesin Kumar	CPI(M)	244	Renjith.R	Indian National Congress	330	Manju.S	BJP	204	Renjith.R	86	Indian National Congress	UDF
10	Krishibhavan	P.Nishakumari	CPI	297	N.Deepak	Indian National Congress	124	Sunilal	BJP	75	P.Nishakumari	47	CPI	LDF
11	Market	C.Rekha	CPI(M)	154	R.Shaji	Indian National Congress	370	Mylakkal Ashokan	BJP	24	R.Shaji	216	Indian National Congress	UDF
12	Town	Premlal G.S	CPI(M)	206	Satheesh Vavara	Indian National Congress	178	Swarnnamma Suresh	BJP	449	Swarnnamma Suresh	243	BJP	NDA
13	Attinpuram	Athira.J	CPI	200	Suprabhangy.S	Indian National Congress	121	Anisha.S	BJP	289	Anisha.S	89	BJP	NDA
14	Puthiyidam	O.Shailaja	CPI(M)	455	O.Rajani	Indian National Congress	175	Radhikarani	BJP	243	O.Shailaja	212	CPI (M)	LDF
15	Kottamoola	V.Sheela Kumary	CPI(M)	307	Sreeja.P	Indian National Congress	358	Geethabhai Amma	BJP	88	Sreeja.P	51	Indian National Congress	UDF
16	Nerukadav	A.Safarulla	CPI(M)	294	Shibinad	Indian National Congress	119	Anil Kumar	BJP	10	A.Safarulla	49	CPI (M)	LDF
17	Thekkumbhagam	K.M Zaheer	CPI	200	Shereef	IUML	219	Shyamprakash	BJP	2	Shereef	19	IUML	UDF
18	Puthiyakav	Sanal Lal.J	CPI(M)	377	A.Shuhaib	Indian National Congress	158	Laila Ananthazhikam	BJP	9	Sanal Lal.J	219	CPI (M)	LDF
19	Vadakkumbhagam	Reena Kamal	CPI(M)	260	Liby.T	Indian National Congress	266	Ashalatha.A	BJP	3	Liby.T	6	Indian National Congress	UDF
20	Kurandikulam	Soja Mujeeb	CPI(M)	317	Arifa Teacher	Indian National Congress	455	Sindhu	BJP	51	Arifa Teacher	136	Indian National Congress	UDF
21	Chillaikkal	Asoora Beevi.S	CPI(M)	296	Khadeeja Beevi	Indian National Congress	405				Khadeeja Beevi	109	Indian National Congress	UDF
22	Pozhikkara	Remya Chandran	CPI	158	B.Vimalambika	Indian National Congress	292	Sreekala.S	BJP	137	B.Vimalambika	134	Indian National Congress	UDF
23	Anchal Office	Naseema	CPI(M)	360	Rashida.R	Indian National Congress	329	Remya Krishnan	BJP	22	Naseema	31	CPI (M)	LDF
24	Maniyamkulam	Hima Hari	CPI(M)	230	Suja Suresh	Indian National Congress	70	S.Sheela	BJP	346	S.Sheela	116	BJP	NDA
25	Kurumandal	O.Komalam	CPI(M)	245	Shreeja	Indian National Congress	116	L.Sindhu	BJP	480	L.Sindhu	235	BJP	NDA
26	Puttingal	Sujiraj	CPI	201	Sudheerkumar	Indian National Congress	369	Sabin H.S	BJP	155	Sudheerkumar	168	Indian National Congress	UDF
27	Railway Station	S.Sreelal	CPI(M)	365	Adv.Latha Mohandas	Indian National Congress	84	Pradeep.G	BJP	308	S.Sreelal	57	CPI (M)	LDF
28	Punjirakkulam	C.Raji	CPI	175	Raji.S	Indian National Congress	333	Sukanya Surendran	BJP	137	Raji.S	158	Indian National Congress	UDF
29	Kallumkunnu	B.T Ambika	CPI(M)	287	Geetha.S	Indian National Congress	414	Saranya Manoj	BJP	49	Geetha.S	127	Indian National Congress	UDF
30	Mangakunnu	G.Suresh babu	CPI(M)	323	Geetha.S	RSP	433	Rajeev.C	BJP	104	Geetha.S	110	RSP	UDF
31	Pukkulam	Girija Pradeep	CPI(M)	442	R.Sulochana	Indian National Congress	99	Sindhu Sudheer	BJP	92	Girija Pradeep	298	CPI (M)	LDF
32	Yakshikkavu	Manju Vijayachandran	CPI(M)	200	A.Mini	RSP	251	Mayarani	BJP	84	A.Mini	51	RSP	UDF

=== By alliance ===
LDF	SEATS	UDF	SEATS	NDA	SEATS	OTHER	SEATS
CPI(M)	13	INC	12	BJP	4	IND	0
CPI	1	RSP	2	--	--	--	--
Total	14	Total	14	Total	4	Total	0
Change	-3	Change	+4	Change	+1	Change	-2

== See also ==
- Paravur
- 2020 Kollam Municipal Corporation election
