= Chathinamkulam =

Chathinamkulam Chathinaamkulam
- Neighbourhood
- Location in Kerala, India Chathinamkulam (Kerala)
- Coordinates: 8.927°N 76.629°E
- Country: India
- State: Kerala
- District: Kollam

Government
  - Type: Municipal corporation
  - Body: Kollam Municipal Corporation(KMC)

Languages
  - Official: Malayalam, English
- Time zone: UTC+5:30 (IST)
- PIN: 691014
- Vehicle registration: KL-02
- Lok Sabha constituency: Kollam
- Civic agency: Kollam Municipal Corporation
- Avg. summer temperature: 34 °C (93 °F)
- Avg. winter temperature: 22 °C (72 °F)
- Website: http://www.kollam.nic.in

Chathinamkulam is a neighbourhood in the city of Kollam in the south west Indian state of Kerala. One of Kollam's 55 councils, it lies close to Chandanathoppe and is in fact one of the most beautiful neighborhoods in the state of Kerala. The postal code of the area is 691014.
