= Koottikkada =

Koottikkada Koottikada
- Neighbourhood
- Location in Kollam, India Koottikkada (India)
- Coordinates: 8.854297°N 76.638033°E
- Country: India
- State: Kerala
- City: Kollam

Government
  - Body: Kollam Municipal Corporation(KMC)

Languages
  - Official: Malayalam, English
- Time zone: UTC+5:30 (IST)
- PIN: 691020
- Vehicle registration: KL-02
- Lok Sabha constituency: Kollam
- Civic agency: Kollam Municipal Corporation
- Avg. summer temperature: 34 °C (93 °F)
- Avg. winter temperature: 22 °C (72 °F)
- Website: http://www.kollam.nic.in

Koottikkada or Koottikada is a small neighbourhood of the city of Kollam. It is the 29th ward in Kollam Municipal Corporation.

== See also ==
- Kollam
- Mayyanad
- Paravur
- Kollam Municipal Corporation
- Mayyanad railway station
