= Thoppilkadavu =

Thoppilkadavu Thoppilkkadavu
- Neighbourhood
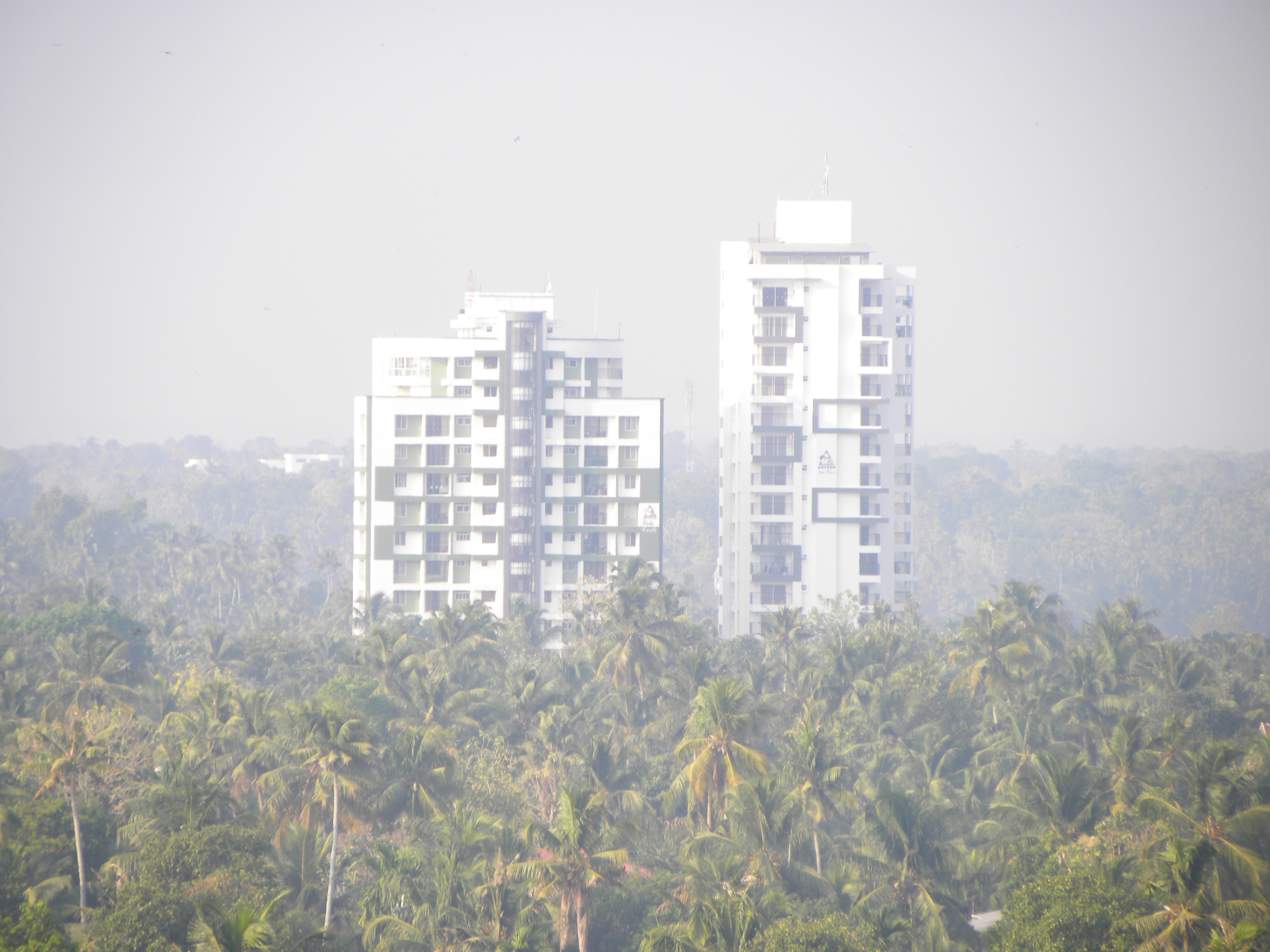
- Apartments in Thoppilkadavu

- Location in Kollam, India Thoppilkadavu (Kerala) Thoppilkadavu (India)
- Coordinates: 8.895434°N 76.572558°E
- Country: India
- State: Kerala
- District: Kollam
- City: Kollam

Government
  - Body: Kollam Municipal Corporation(KMC)

Languages
  - Official: Malayalam, English
- Time zone: UTC+5:30 (IST)
- PIN: 691008
- Vehicle registration: KL-02
- Lok Sabha constituency: Kollam
- Civic agency: Kollam Municipal Corporation
- Avg. summer temperature: 34 °C (93 °F)
- Avg. winter temperature: 22 °C (72 °F)
- Website: http://www.kollam.nic.in

Thoppilkadavu or Thoppilkkadavu is one of the neighbourhoods of the city of Kollam, located on the shores of Ashtamudi Lake in Kerala, India. It is an integral part of Kollam city. Presence of Ashtamudi Lake is increasing the importance of Thoppilkadavu as one of the tourism hotspots in the city. Thoppilkadavu is the western endpoint of Asramam Link Road in the city.

== Location ==
- Kollam Junction railway station - 5.2 km
- Andamukkam City Bus Stand - 4.3 km
- Kollam KSRTC Bus Station - 1.7 km
- Kollam Port - 2.2 km
- Chinnakada - 3.2 km
- Paravur - 26 km

== Significance ==
Thoppilkadavu is an emerging backwater tourism spot in Kollam city. The scenic Ashtamudi Lake and backwater tourism is increasing the importance of Thoppilkadavu. Inland Waterways Authority of India(IWAI) has built a boat yard here in Thoppilkadavu. Boats connecting various towns in Kerala will start plying through Thoppilkadavu once Government of India complete the works on National Waterway-3. Thoppilkadavu will become an important transport hub of Kollam city once Government of Kerala complete the works over the much awaited Asramam Link Road. In the Phase-II development, the current Asramam Link Road would be extended up to Thoppilkadavu at a cost of Rs.63 crore. The project comprises construction of a new bridge across the confluence point of the Kollam canal with the Ashtamudi Lake. On completion, Asramam Link Road will enable those passing through Kollam avoid the busy Collectorate-High School Junction-Taluk Office junction-Chinnakada and railway station road to proceed.

== See also ==
- Asramam Link Road
- Chinnakada
- Kollam
- Kollam Junction railway station
- Thevally
