= Vallikeezhu =

Vallikeezh
- Neighbourhood
- Vallikeezhu
- Location in Kerala, India Vallikeezh (Kerala)
- Coordinates: 8°54′45.31″N 76°33′35.99″E
- Country: India
- State: Kerala
- District: Kollam district
- Municipal Corporation: Kollam

Languages
  - Official: Malayalam
- Time zone: UTC+5:30 (IST)
- PIN: 691 012
- Telephone code: 0474
- Vehicle registration: KL-02
- Website: Kollam Municipal Corporation

Vallikeezhu or Vallikeezh is a neighbourhood situated at the northern region of Kollam city. It is about 5 km away from Chinnakada, the city centre of Kollam. Vallikeezhu is the 5th ward in Kollam Municipal Corporation council.

== Importance ==
Vallikeezhu is an important neighbourhood of Kollam city. It is very close to Neendakara fishing harbour. The proposed Kollam Bypass will start from Althramoodu near Vallikeezhu. Govt. Higher Secondary School Vallikeezhu is a famous school in this locality. LDF is the ruling front of Vallikeezhu.
