= Honey Benjamin =

Indian politician

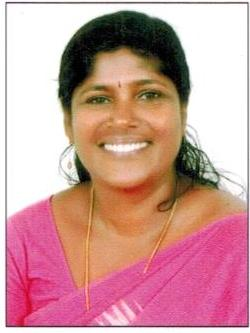

Mayor Of Kollam Municipal Corporation
- In office 28 February 2025 – 26 December 2025
- Preceded by: Prasanna Earnest
- Succeeded by: A. K. Hafeez
- Constituency: Vadakkumbhagam, Kollam City Corporation (Ward No:9)
- In office 16 December 2019 – 27 December 2020
- Preceded by: V. Rajendrababu
- Succeeded by: Prasanna Earnest
- In office 25 November 2014 – 31 October 2015
- Preceded by: Prasanna Earnest
- Succeeded by: V. Rajendrababu

Personal details
- Born: Kollam
- Party: Communist Party of India
- Spouse: Benjamin
- Children: Hamin J.Benjamin, Sandra J.Benjamin

Honey Benjamin was the mayor of Kollam city. She is a CPI party member and politician from Kollam city, India. She was the first CPI mayor of Kollam City Corporation. Benjamin first became mayor in 2014 by one vote, with a total of 28 votes against her opponent Maya Ganesh of the UDF's 27 in the council election. This election was held due to the resignation of ex-mayor Prasanna Earnest as part of an agreement with the LDF due to a no-confidence motion raised by the UDF. However in the 2015 election, the name of V. Rajendrababu was proposed by Benjamin and he became the next mayor instead. She later returned to power following the February 2025 election with Honey securing 37 votes, while UDF candidate and Maruthadi ward councillor Sumi M received seven votes. She then lost the December 2025 election to A. K. Hafeez of the INC, ending 25 years of continuous LDF governance.

== Works and contributions ==
As mayor, Benjamin focused on issues such as waste management and the provision of electricity. In January 2020, Benjamin announced a campaign to use drone-mapping to gather information about resource management in the city of Kollam.

To promote shooting sports in Kollam district an indoor shooting range was opened in the city, Mayor Honey Benjamin lighted the traditional lamp. Honey Benjamin presided over the inauguration of Kollam women’s police station which has become the second district in the State to have a women’s police station whereas Kannur holds the first place.
