= Thrikkadavoor =

- Zone & Neighbourhood
- Kadavoor
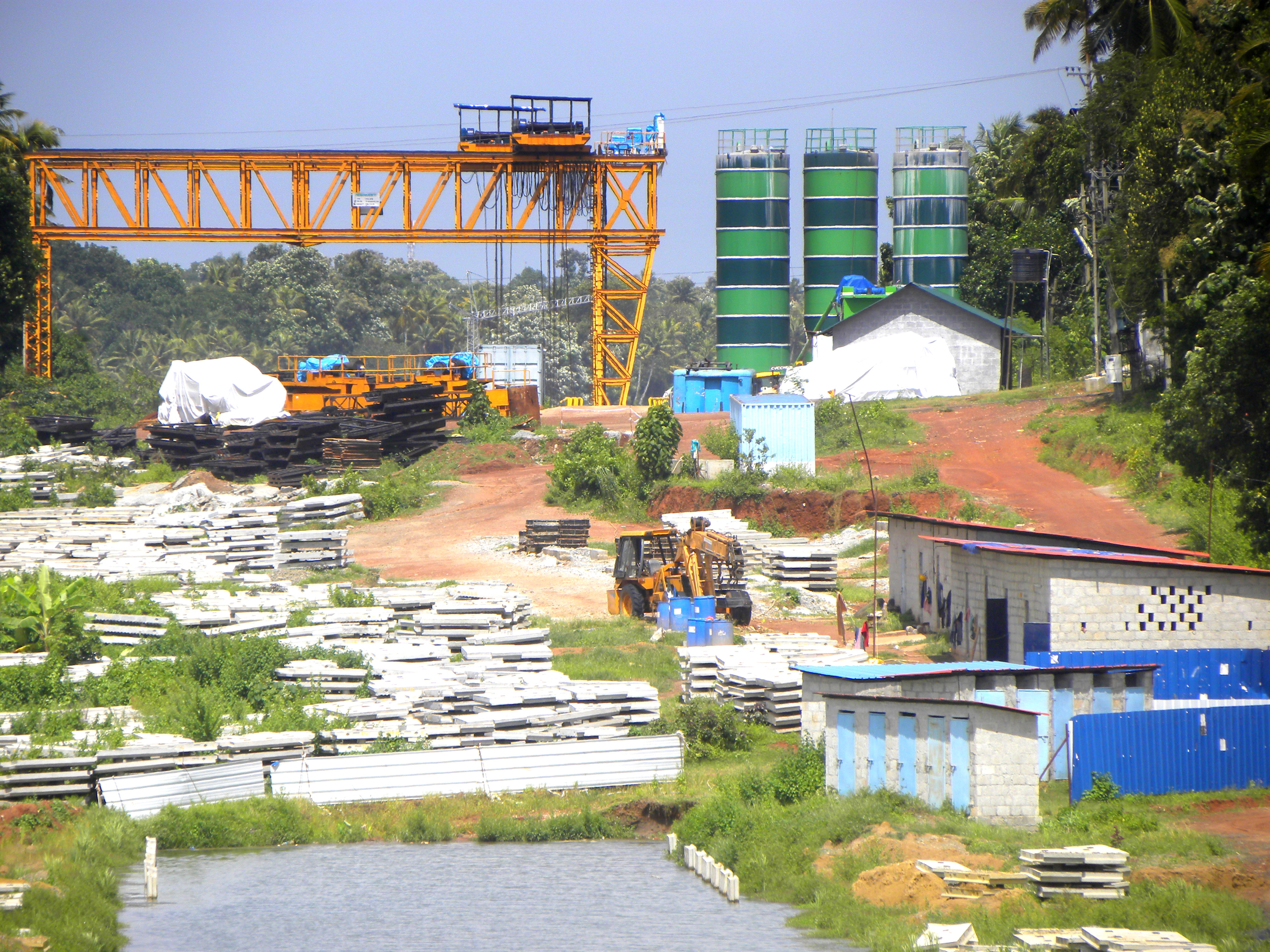
- Under construction Kollam Bypass near Thrikkadavoor

- Location in Kollam Thrikkadavoor (Kerala)
- Coordinates: 8°55′14.0874″N 76°35′41.2188″E
- Country: India
- State: Kerala
- District: Kollam district
- Municipal Corporation: Kollam

Government
  - Type: Councillor

Area
  - Total: 14.85 km^{2} (5.73 sq mi)

Population (2011)
  - Total: 39,285

Languages
  - Official: Malayalam
- Time zone: UTC+5:30 (IST)
- PIN: 691601
- Telephone code: 0474
- Vehicle registration: KL-02
- Website: Kollam Municipal Corporation

Thrikkadavoor is a town and a neighbourhood of Kollam city in the state of Kerala, India, approximately 5 kilometres north of Kollam city centre. Thrikkadavoor was a separate panchayath till 2015. In May 2015, Government of Kerala expanded the City Corporation of Kollam by merging Thrikkadavoor panchayath.

== Notable people ==
- Eugene Pandala, architect
- Kadavoor Sivadasan, politician

== Demographics ==
As of 2011 India census, Thrikkadavoor had a population of 39285 with 19005 males and 20280 females.
