= Valathungal =

Valathungal Valathumgal
- Neighbourhood
- Location in Kollam, India Valathungal (Kerala) Valathungal (India)
- Coordinates: 8.858199°N 76.628695°E
- Country: India
- State: Kerala
- City: Kollam

Government
  - Body: Kollam Municipal Corporation(KMC)

Languages
  - Official: Malayalam, English
- Time zone: UTC+5:30 (IST)
- PIN: 691011
- Vehicle registration: KL-02
- Lok Sabha constituency: Kollam
- Civic agency: Kollam Municipal Corporation
- Avg. summer temperature: 34 °C (93 °F)
- Avg. winter temperature: 22 °C (72 °F)
- Website: http://www.kollam.nic.in

Valathungal or Valathumgal is a neighbourhood and suburb of Kollam city in the Indian state of Kerala. It is the 30th ward in Kollam Municipal Corporation. Valathungal is a fairly densely populated area of the city. Eravipuram railway station is very close to Valathungal.

There were previously two different municipal councils for the Valathungal area (Valathungal West and Valathungal East), which in 2005 merged to form a single council. Valathungal council is in the Eravipuram zone of Kollam Municipal Corporation.
