= Kottukadu =

- village
- Location in Kerala, India Kottukadu (India)
- Coordinates: 8°59′0″N 76°33′0″E
- Country: India
- State: Kerala
- District: Kollam

Languages
  - Official: Malayalam, English
- Time zone: UTC+5:30 (IST)
- PIN: 691585
- Nearest city: chavara
- Climate: normal (Köppen)

Kottukadu is a small town situated in the Chavara panchayath. Kottukadu Muslim jamaathu is the second most populated jamaath in Kollam district, village is part of the Karunagappally taluk and Chavara Assembly constituency.
