= Kureepuzha =

- Neighbourhood
- Country: India
- State: Kerala
- District: Kollam

Government
  - Body: Kollam Municipal Corporation(KMC)

Languages
  - Official: Malayalam, English
- Time zone: UTC+5:30 (IST)
- PIN: 691604
- Vehicle registration: KL-02
- Lok Sabha constituency: Kollam
- Civic agency: Kollam Municipal Corporation
- Avg. summer temperature: 34 °C (93 °F)
- Avg. winter temperature: 22 °C (72 °F)
- Website: http://www.kollam.nic.in

Kureepuzha is a peninsula region in the city of Kollam, Kerala, India, located on the shore of Ashtamudi Lake. Kureepuzha is sharing borders with the village of Neeravil in the north. It is one among the 55 councils of Kollam Municipal Corporation(KMC). Kerala's only turkey farm and a regional poultry farm are at Kureepuazha. Kollam city's waste management plant is also situated at Kureepuzha.

== Transport ==
A number of buses primarily operated by private owners and Kerala State Road Transport Corporation connect Kureepuzha with Kollam city through Neeravil and Anchalummodu. Auto rickshaws are a popular mode of transport in the village. Ferry services operated by Kerala State Water Transport Department run between Kureepuzha and Kollam city, Kavanad etc. Canoe services provided by private owners are also widely used.

== Education ==
The government owned Upper Primary School offers schooling up to 7th standard in the Kerala State syllabus. Two privately owned English medium schools provide schooling up to higher secondary level.

== Tourism ==
Even though the village is located on the famous backwaters of Kollam District, tourism is not a major form of revenue. There has been some development in the tourism sector with the establishment of a family estate in the south of the peninsula.

== See also ==
- Kollam Beach
- Chinnakada
- Andamukkam City Bus Stand
- Kadappakada
- Asramam Maidan
