= Polayathode =

Polayathode Polayathodu
- Neighbourhood
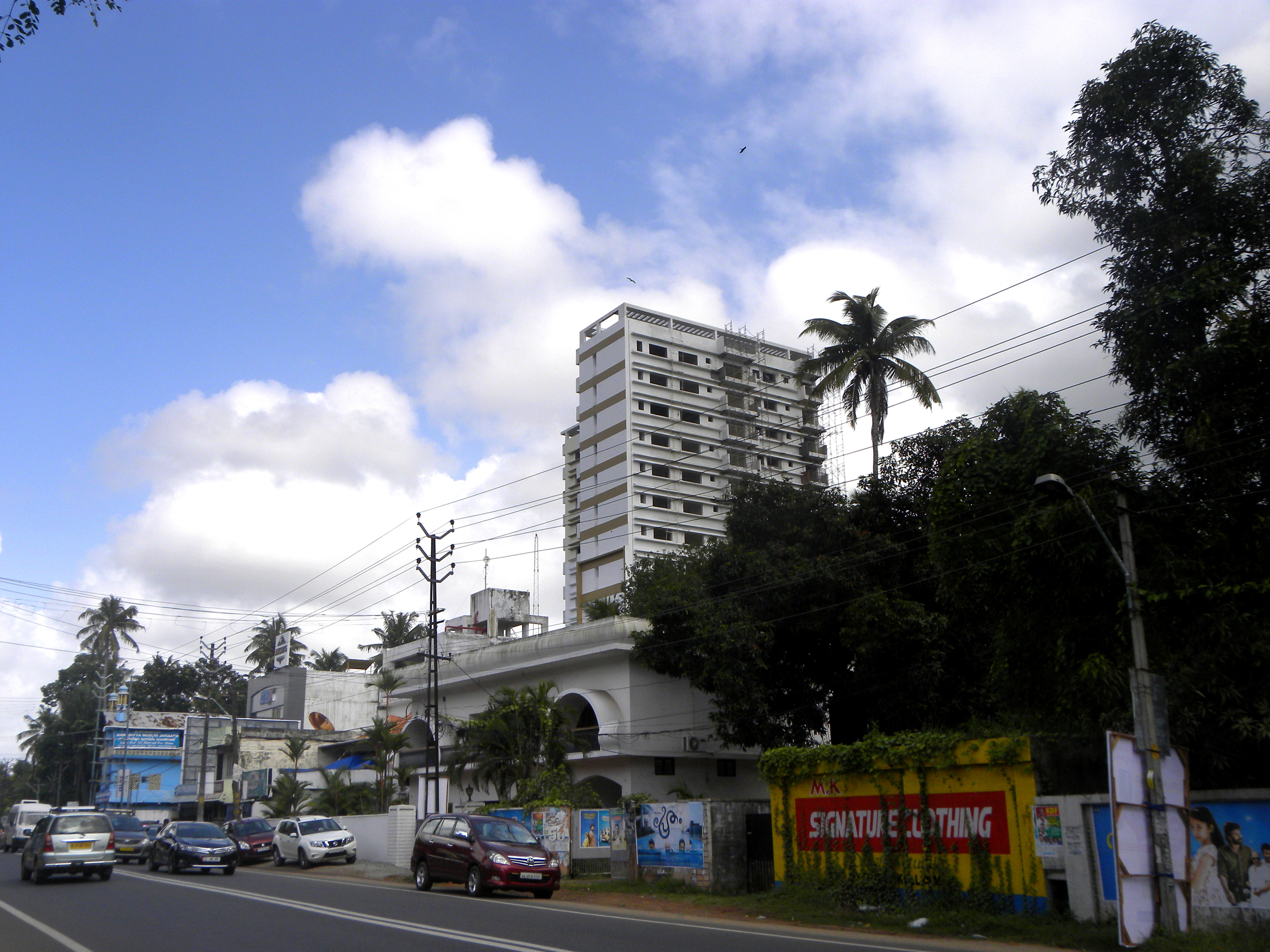
- A Highriser Underconstruction at Polayathode, Kollam city

- Location in Kollam, India Polayathode (Kerala) Polayathode (India)
- Coordinates: 8.877833°N 76.611278°E
- Country: India
- State: Kerala
- District: Kollam

Government
  - Body: Kollam Municipal Corporation(KMC)

Languages
  - Official: Malayalam, English
- Time zone: UTC+5:30 (IST)
- PIN: 691021
- Vehicle registration: KL-02
- Lok Sabha constituency: Kollam
- Civic agency: Kollam Municipal Corporation
- Avg. summer temperature: 34 °C (93 °F)
- Avg. winter temperature: 22 °C (72 °F)
- Website: http://www.kollam.nic.in

Polayathode or Polayathodu is one of the fastest growing neighbourhoods of the city of Kollam, in the state of Kerala, India. It is situated at National Highways – NH 66 (Earlier NH 47). Kerala Police have identified Polayathode as one of the traffic black spots in the state.

== Location ==
- Kollam Junction railway station - 2 kilometres (1.2 mi)
- Andamukkam City Bus Stand - 2.7 kilometres (1.7 mi)
- Kollam KSRTC Bus Station - 3 kilometres (1.9 mi)
- Kollam Port - 5 kilometres (3.1 mi)
- Chinnakada - 2.3 kilometres (1.4 mi)
- Tangasseri - 5.2 kilometres (3.2 mi)

== Importance ==
Polayathode is one of the highly urbanized areas of Kollam. The proximity of Polayathode to major places in the city including Pattathanam, Chinnakada, Mundakkal and Thattamala make it an important destination in the city. One of the major public crematoriums in Kollam is situated at Polayathode.

== Major public/private institutions in Polayathode ==
- ESI Dispensary
- Public Crematorium
- KFC
- Domino's Pizza
- Reebok
- Max Fashion
- West Side
- Fabindia
- WoodLand
- Eye Mall
- Public Market
- V V Electricals, Plumbing and Sanitary
- Enfit Drug Bank
- PORUNNELSTORES

== See also ==
- Kollam
- Kollam Beach
- Chinnakada
- Andamukkam City Bus Stand
- Kadappakada
- Asramam Maidan
