= Anchalumoodu =

- Neighbourhood
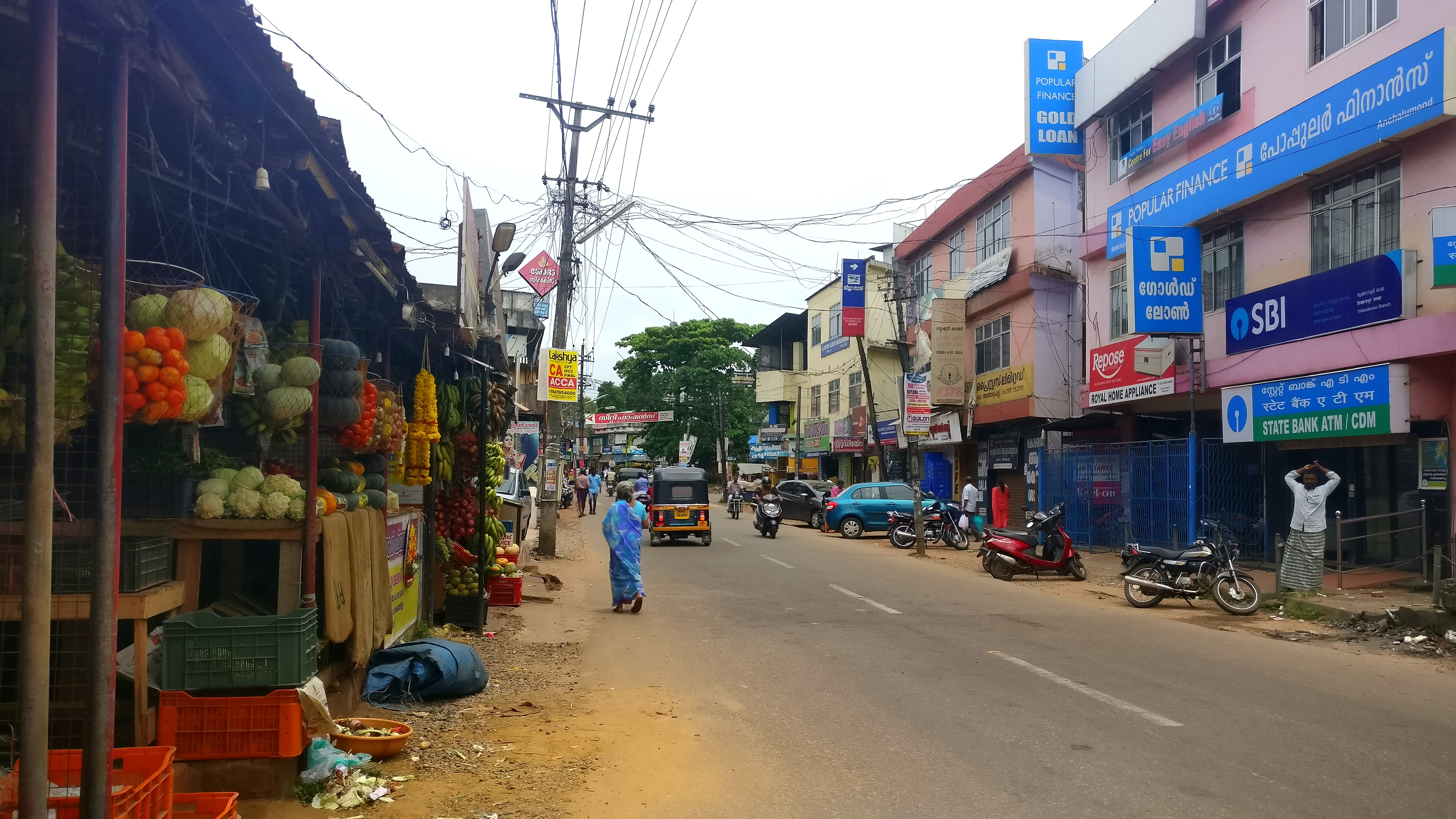
- Anchalumoodu Town

- Location in Kollam, India Anchalumoodu (Kerala)
- Coordinates: 8°55′56.2008″N 76°36′13.9818″E
- Country: India
- State: Kerala
- District: Kollam district
- City: Kollam

Government
  - Type: Councillor

Languages
  - Official: Malayalam
- Time zone: UTC+5:30 (IST)
- PIN: 691601
- Telephone code: 0474
- Vehicle registration: KL-02
- Website: Kollam Municipal Corporation

Anchalumoodu is a town and neighbourhood of the city of Kollam, India. It is a historic town near the place, where the Peruman railway accident happened in 1988. Anchalumoodu is 8 km away from Kollam city, 26 km from Paravur and 8 km from Kundara town. College of Engineering, Perumon is very close to this place. Anchalumoodu was a part of Thrikkadavoor till 2015. In May 2015, Government of Kerala have decided to expand City Corporation of Kollam by merging Thrikkadavoor panchayath. Now Anchalumoodu along with Thrikkadavoor is a part of Kollam city.

Speciality of Anchalumoodu is that, 75% of it is surrounded by Ashtamudi lake, which is known for its scenery and attracts hundreds of tourists to Kollam.

== Transport ==
=== Rail ===
The nearest railway station to Anchalumood is Perinad railway station which is about 2.5 km from the town. All passenger trains stop at this railway station. Kollam Junction Railway Station, one of the biggest junction and busiest railway stations in Kerala is 9 km away from Anchalumoodu. Kundara is 9 km away from Anchalumoodu town.

=== Roads ===
Anchalumoodu is connected well with roads. The town is 8 km away from Kollam city centre Chinnakada and 8 km from Kundara town. Regular city services and transport buses are there to Kollam city from Anchalumoodu. National Highway 183 (India) passes through Anchalumoodu. Bus services are available to important places in Kerala which include Trivandrum, Ernakulam, etc.

== Education ==
Anchalummodu has its fair share of privately owned and state owned educational institutions. Institutions of education are affiliated to either the Council for the Indian School Certificate Examinations (CISCE), the Central Board for Secondary Education (CBSE), or the Kerala State Education Board.

Most private schools use English as the medium of instruction whereas government run schools offer both English and Malayalam as a medium of instruction.

The Government Higher Secondary School at Anchalumoodu is one of the biggest and reputed government schools in Kollam district.

The main higher education centre near to Anchalumoodu is the College of Engineering, Perumon. Nalanda ITC is located near to the GHSS Anchalummood.

== Places of worship ==
Anchalumoodu has a mix of different religious communities. Main temples in and around Anchalumoodu town include Kadavoor Siva Temple, Perumon Bhadrakali temple, Perumon Durga Devi Temple, Ashtamudi Virabhadra Swamy Temple, Panayam Bhadrakaali Temple, Sastholi Temple, Kuppana Velayudha Mangalam Temple, Kolleril Siva Temple, Karuva Temple and. Mosques include Kureepuzha Mosque, Karuva Mosque and Chiraiyil Mosque. Important churches are Assemblies of God in India, India Pentecostal Church of God, St. Thomas Orthodox Church, Roman Catholic Church.

=== Kuppana Velayudha Mangalam Temple ===
The temple is one of the Subramania temples in Kollam District. Thaippooya Festival (10 days long) is the most important festival. People from different parts of the district come over here during the occasion. Several elephants assemble at the temple premises. At night Khoshayatra is held there. To reach the temple, visitors alight at Anchalummodu town bus stop. From there auto rickshaws are available to go to the temple. The temple is 1.5 km away from Anchalumoodu junction.
