= Mathilil =

Suburb of Kollam

Coordinates: 8.910°N 76.585°E

Mathilil is a suburb of Kollam city in the Indian state of Kerala. Located approximately 2 kilometres (1.2 mi) north of Kollam town, it covers an area of 1.5 square kilometres (0.58 sq mi) and has a population of 12,560. Mathilil is a developing area and is now home to educational institutions, a five star hotel, and a number of major real estate ventures.

== Facilities ==
Schools and training colleges

- LKG and UKG school
- Lower primary school
- St. George Up School

Established in 1952.

- Kasthoorba Gandhi Technical Training Institute.

Opened in 2004, the institute is owned by the Kasthoorba Gandhi Memorial Women’s Charitable Society, which is registered under the Travancore Cochin Charitable Societies Act. About 50 women irrespective of caste, creed or politics are members of the society. This is the only technical training institute in the state run by a women's organization. There is an intake of 50 students per year.

Hospitals

- Matha Medical Centre

Places of worship

- St Casimir's Church.

Built in 1873, it was reconstructed in 1993 and renovated in 2013. The annual 14-day-long festival of Saint George is held in the month of April.

- Thrikkadavoor Mahadeva Temple
- Venkekkara Devi Temple
- Edavanatt Devi Temple
- Punthala Temple
- Mathilil Subramanya Swamy Temple;
