= Kollam Municipal Corporation =

Local civic body in Kollam, Kerala, India

- Logo of KMC

Type
- Type: Municipal Corporation of Kollam
- Term limits: 5 years

History
- Founded: 1 October 2000; 26 years ago Became Municipality in the year 1921.

Leadership
- Mayor: A.K Hafeez, INC
- Deputy Mayor: Dr. Udaya Sukumaran, INC
- Municipal Corporation Secretary: Saji S S

Structure
- Seats: 56 6 Zones: Central Zone; Sakthikulangara; Vadakkevila; Kilikollur; Eravipuram; Thrikkadavoor
- Political groups: Government (27) UDF (27): INC (22); RSP (3); IUML (2); Official Opposition (16); LDF (16): CPI(M) (13); CPI (3); Other Opposition (13): BJP (12); SDPI (1)
- Committees: 8: Development standing committee; Education & Sports standing committee; Finance standing committee; Health standing committee; Public works standing committee; Tax appeal standing committee; Town planning standing committee; Welfare standing committee

Elections
- Last election: 9 December 2025
- Next election: December 2030

Meeting place
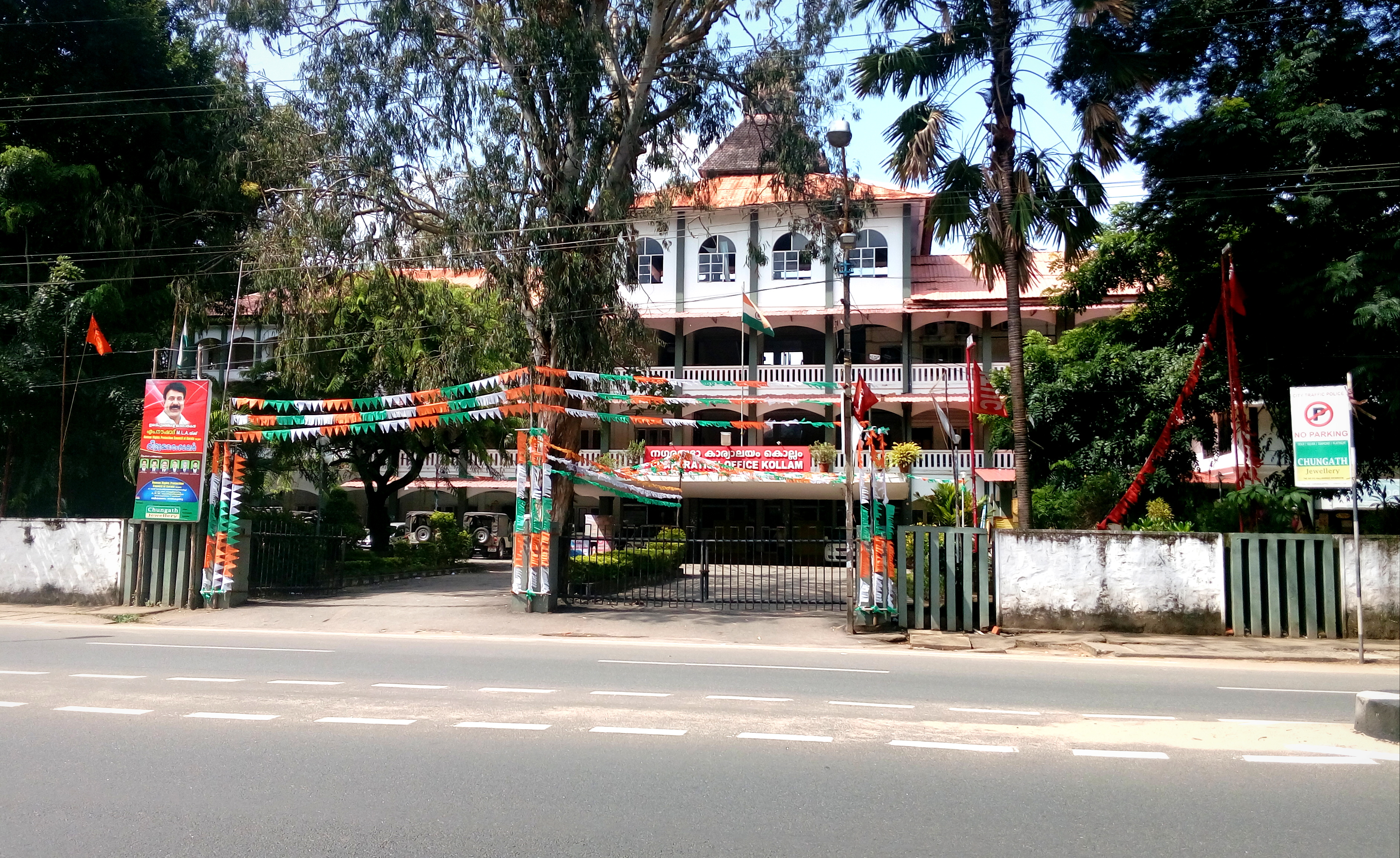
- Corporation Office, Cantonment, Kollam

Website
- www.kollamcorporation.gov.in

Footnotes
- ISO 9001:2015 certification (May 2019) for the best Municipal administration and services.

Kollam Municipal Corporation (KMC) is an Urban Local body in Kerala that governs Kollam It is the fourth-largest city corporation by population in the state, and the third-largest by area. Constituted in 1921 as a municipality, it was officially recognized as a city corporation in 2000. The body governs an area of 73.03 square kilometres (28.20 sq mi) centered at Kollam, with about 56 divisions and a population of 397,419.

== History ==
Kollam, was an ancient trade hub and one of the largest port cities in Asia in ancient times. In 20th century city became a major cashew processing and export center and industrial center and also the seat of British Residency.

In 1894 through second regulation a committee was constituted at Quilon for sanitation and by 1901 this committee got taxation powers. In 1910 this was elevated to Town Development Authority and by 1921 a municipality in 1921. It is also said that a municipal board was constituted in 1888 precursor to this. In 1928 Regent Maharani proclaimed an order which clearly defined the powers and duties of the municipal council. The council had 17 members which included 11 elected, nominated and ex-officio members and the voting powers was restricted to tax payers and graduates till 1946. The initial chairmen were all advocates of bar council.

In 1948, the council got its first elected chairman and first chairman from a backward community. The council was suspended between 1984–88 and powers where conferred to District Collectors then. The municipality initially had its office at Puthukulangara Palace in Anandavalleshwaram, in 1937 a new building was constructed near Chinnakada flyover and Sri Moolam Thirunal Palace. In 1970's the present day building near Cantonment was purchased from H&C.

The high population density, population and economic activity eventually led to Kollam Municipality getting upgraded to a Municipal Corporation by the Kerala Government on 1 October 2000.

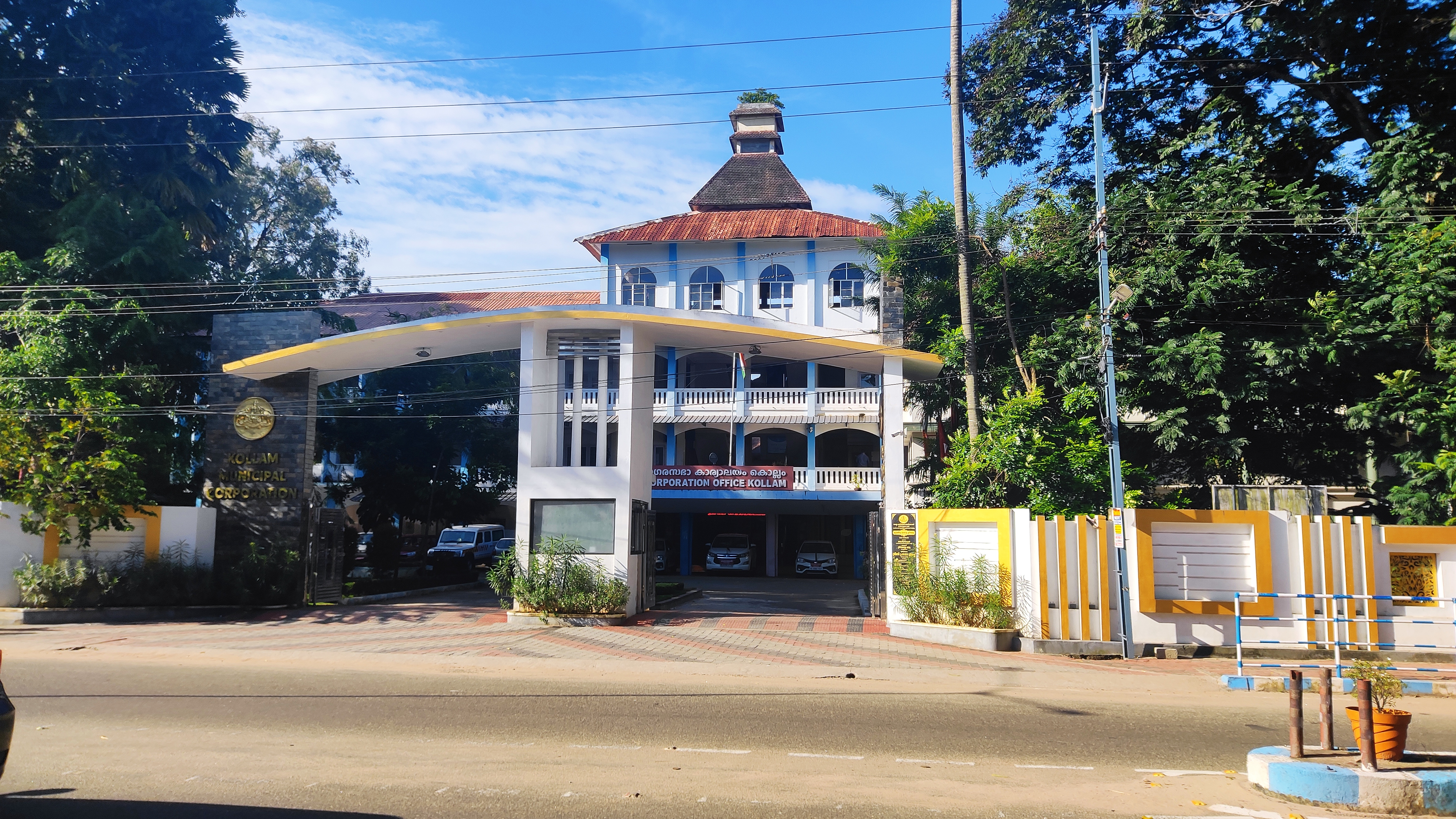
Corporation office Kollam

The city population of Kollam increased substantially from 139,852 in 1991 to 346,013 in 2011 since Vadakkevila, Sakthikulangara, Eravipuram and Kilikollur Panchayats were merged with Kollam City when city was upgraded to a Municipal Corporation. As a result, the area run by the Municipal Corporation increased from 18.48 square kilometres (7.14 sq mi) to 58.18 square kilometres (22.46 sq mi). In May 2015, Thrikkadavoor Panchayat was also merged with Kollam city, increasing the total population to 397,419, with a total area of 73.03 square kilometres (28.20 sq mi).

== Administration ==
Kollam Municipal Corporation (KMC)
Mayor	A K Hafeez
Deputy Mayor	Karumalil Dr Udaya Sukumaran
Secretary	Saji S S

The City Corporation of Kollam has a 55-member council headed by a mayor, who is assisted by a deputy mayor. The average population of every ward is around 7,000. Each ward is represented in the Municipal Council by an elected councilor. The Kerala Municipalities (KM) Act, 1994, governs all functions in the KMC. The corporation has eight standing committees for smooth governance of the city. Each of these committees is headed by an elected councilor, who serves as its chairperson. The standing committees are: Finance, Development, Welfare, Health and Education, Public works, Town planning, Tax appeal and Education and Sports.

=== Zones ===
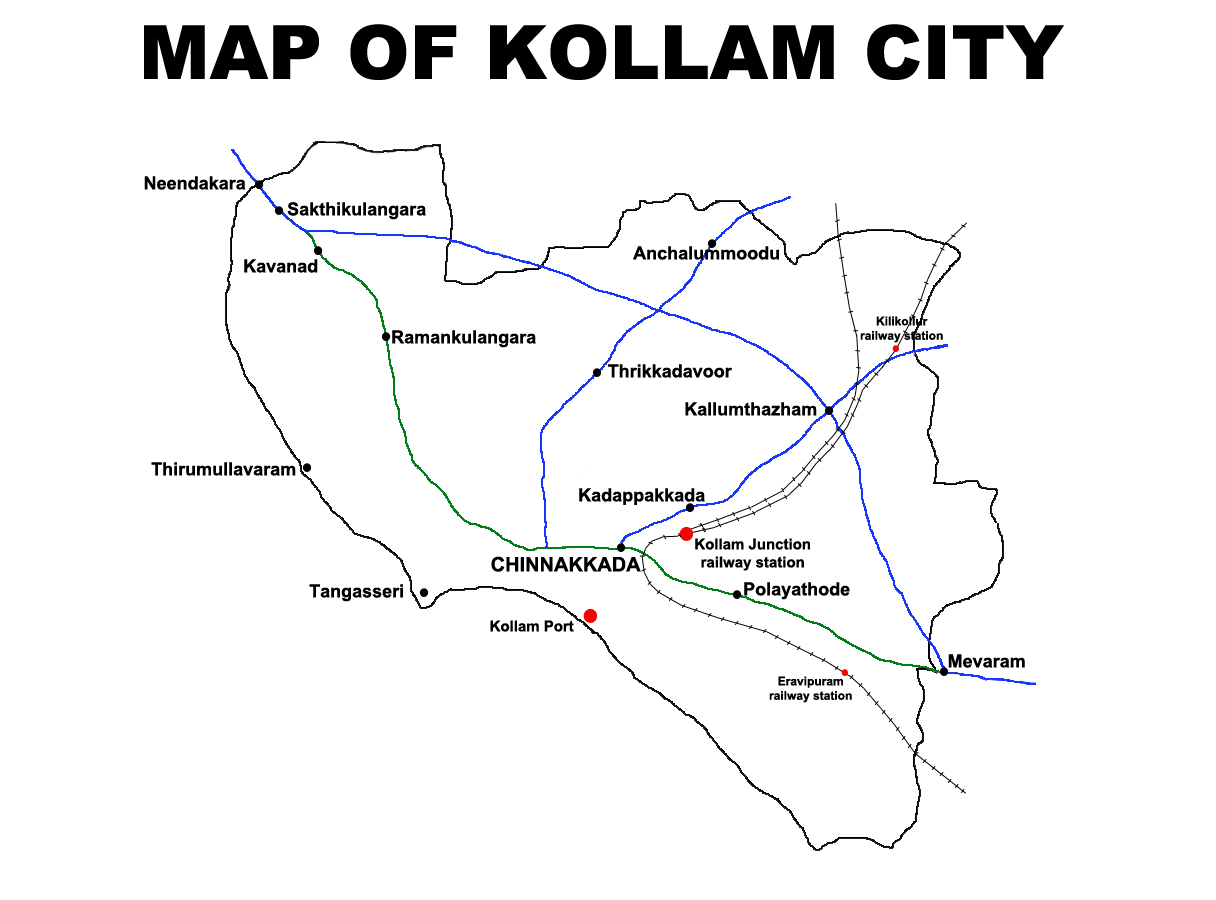
Map of Kollam City

For ease of administration, the KMC is divided into the following seven zones, each housing a zonal office:

- Central Zone - 1
- Central Zone - 2
- Sakthikulangara Zone
- Vadakkevila Zone
- Kilikollur Zone
- Eravipuram Zone
- Thrikkadavoor Zone.

=== Councils ===
The KMC consisted of 55 divisions or councils spread across its seven zones as of 2020. Following the 2024 Local self-government delimitation, the number of councils became 56. The erstwhile Maruthadi, Pallithottam, Anchalamoodu wards got merged or changed borders and Sakthikulangara Harbour, Anchalummoodu West, Anchalummoodu East, and Kannimel West got added as new councils.

=== Functions ===
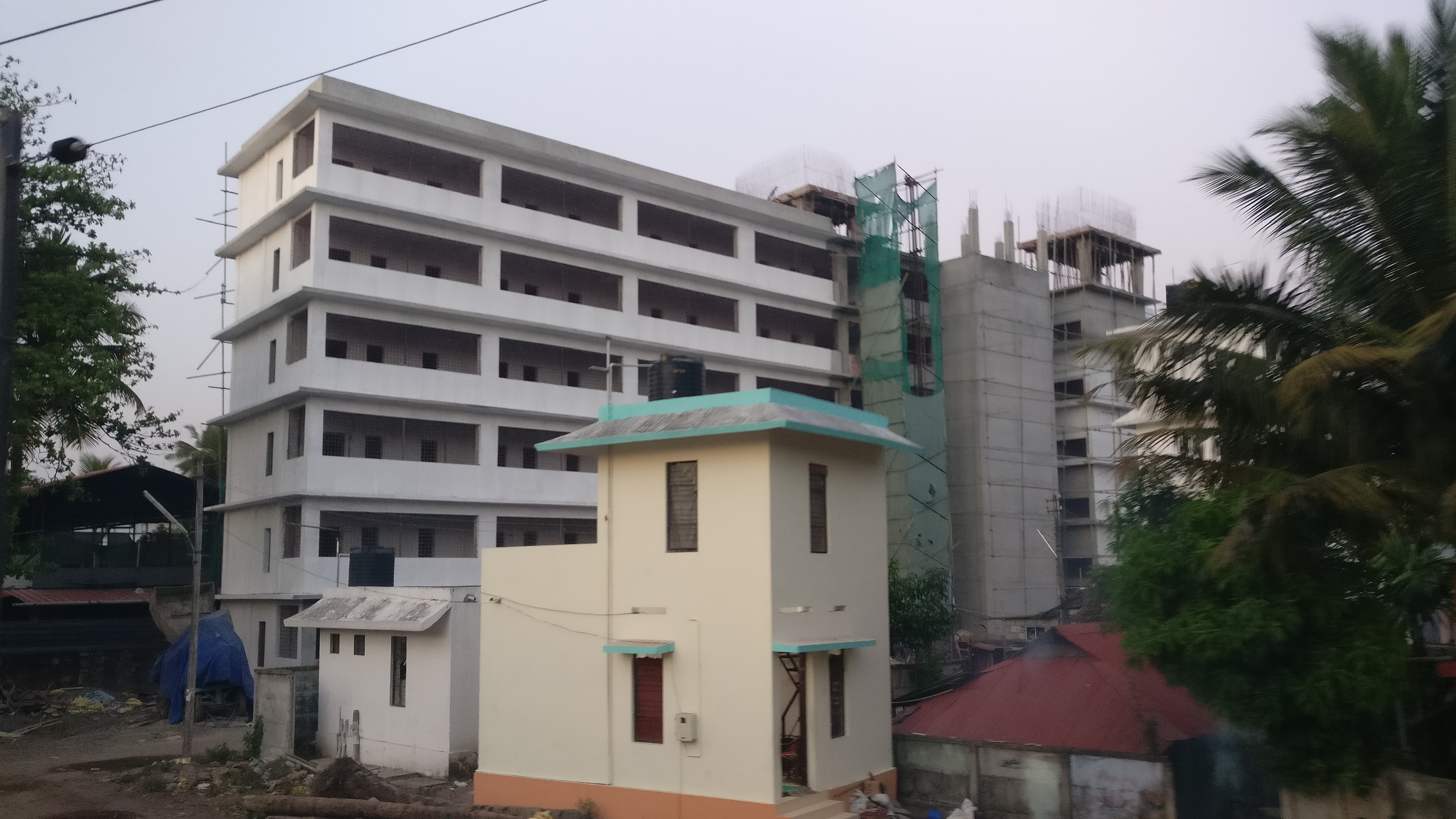
Apartments built at Cantonment area in Kollam Corporation under RAY Project for providing housing in the urban places

As per the Kerala Municipal Act of 1994, the Government of Kerala transferred powers and functions to local self-governments in 1995, along with institutions, offices, and functionaries. Consequently, 18 functions are maintained by the Municipal Corporation:

- Regulation of land use and construction of buildings
- Roads and bridges
- Sanitation and Solid Waste Management
- Slum improvement/upgradation
- Urban poverty alleviation
- Provision of urban amenities such as parks and playgrounds
- Promotion of cultural, educational, and aesthetic aspects
- Burial grounds and crematoria
- Cattle pounds
- Public health - Sewerage, water supply
- Registration of births and deaths
- Public conveniences including street lighting, parking lots, etc.
- Regulation of slaughterhouses
- Spatial planning (urban and socio-economic planning)
- Urban forestry
- Fire fighting
- Education
- Safeguarding the interests of weaker sections

=== Revenue sources ===
The following are the Income sources for the corporation from the Central and State Government.

==== Revenue from taxes ====
Following is the Tax related revenue for the corporation.

- Property tax.
- Profession tax.
- Entertainment tax.
- Grants from Central and State Government like Goods and Services Tax.
- Advertisement tax.

==== Revenue from non-tax sources ====
Following is the Non Tax related revenue for the corporation.

- Water usage charges.
- Fees from Documentation services.
- Rent received from municipal property.
- Funds from municipal bonds.

=== Annual budget ===
A budget will be presented on either January or February month of every year in Kollam Corporation. It usually envisages expenditure, revenue and surplus for that financial year.

Budget Year	Actual Surplus (from last FY)	Expenditure	Revenue	Surplus
2026-27	NA	₹1270.00 cr	₹1384.51 cr	₹114.51 cr
2025-26	NA	₹1145.12 cr	₹1228.57 cr	₹83.45 cr
2024-25	₹192.08cr	₹1090.59 cr	₹1181.42cr	₹90.83 cr
2023-24	₹243.54cr	₹1098.44 cr	₹1187.15cr	₹88.71 cr
2022-23	NA	₹1193.41 cr	₹1292.81cr	₹99.40 cr
2021-22	₹165.41 cr	₹1077.41 cr	₹1124.23 cr	₹46.82 cr
2020-21	₹117.56 cr	₹336.21 cr	₹384 cr	NA
2019-20	NA	₹584.74 cr	₹617.13 cr	₹32.38 cr
2018-19	NA	NA	NA	NA
2017-18	NA	NA	NA	NA
2016-17	NA	NA	NA	NA
2015-16	NA	₹716.17 cr	₹754.88 cr	₹38.71 cr

== Office holders ==
Kollam Municipal Corporation — Office Holders (2025–2030)
Office	Name	Notes
Mayor	A. K. Hafeez (INC)	Incumbent
Deputy Mayor	Udaya Sukumaran (INC)	Incumbent
Chairperson, Finance Standing Committee	To be elected	
Chairperson, Development Standing Committee	To be elected	
Chairperson, Welfare Standing Committee	To be elected	
Chairperson, Health Standing Committee	To be elected	
Chairperson, Public Works Standing Committee	To be elected	
Town Planning Standing Committee	To be elected	
Tax Appeal Standing Committee	To be elected	
Education & Sports Standing Committee	To be elected	
Corporation Secretary	Saji S. S.	Appointed official.

== Elected Members By ward ==
Ward	Party color	Party	Councillor	Alliance
Sakthikulangara Harbour		INC	Xavier Mathias	UDF
Sakthikulangara		BJP	Shiji	NDA
Meenathuchery		RSP	Deepu Gangadharan B	UDF
Kavanad		INC	Radhika Saji	UDF
Vallikeezhu		CPI(M)	Vidya Manoj	LDF
Kureepuzha West		CPI(M)	A.M. Mustafa	LDF
Kureepuzha		INC	B. Ajithkumar	UDF
Neeravil		CPI(M)	Mahesh R	LDF
Anchalummoodu West		INC	Rija Sugunan	UDF
Anchalummoodu East		RSP	Adv. M.S. Gopakumar	UDF
Kadavoor		INC	Dhanya Raju	UDF
Mathilil		CPI(M)	B. Prashanth	LDF
Thevally		BJP	B. Shailaja	NDA
Vadakkumbhagam		INC	Kuruvila Joseph	UDF
Asramam		BJP	Suresh Kumar C	NDA
Uliyakovil		BJP	Sandhya Sajeev	NDA
Uliyakovil East		BJP	Abhilash T.R.	NDA
Kadappakkada		BJP	Prabin Kumar A	NDA
Koyikkal		CPI(M)	A.M. Rafi	LDF
Kallumthazham		BJP	Moncy Das	NDA
Mangadu		CPI	Ajina Prashanth	LDF
Arunnoottimangalam		BJP	T.G. Gireesh	NDA
Chathinamkulam		Independent	A. Nissar	Independent
Karikode		CPI(M)	C. Babu	LDF
College Division		INC	P.K. Anil Kumar	UDF
Palkulangara		CPI(M)	Babu G	LDF
Ammannada		CPI(M)	Nirmala	LDF
Vadakkevila		INC	Krishna Kumar D	UDF
Pallimukku		RSP	Shaima	UDF
Ayathil		CPI(M)	Jaariyath	LDF
Kilikolloor		INC	T. Lailakumari	UDF
Punthalathazham		INC	P. Rajendran Pilla	UDF
Palathara		BJP	R. Destimona	NDA
Manacadu		IUML	Sadakkath A	UDF
Kolloorvila		INC	Mashoor Pallimukku	UDF
Kayyalakkal		IUML	Maajida Wahab	UDF
Valathungal		CPI	Suja	LDF
Akkolil		INC	A.K. Assain	UDF
Thekkumbhagam		INC	Isabella J	UDF
Eravipuram		CPI(M)	Nisha Santhosh	LDF
Bharanikkavu		CPI(M)	Lakshmi Shaji	LDF
Thekkevila		BJP	Deepika Pramoj	NDA
Mundakkal		INC	Jayalakshmi J	UDF
Pattathanam		CPI	Adv. J. Saiju	LDF
Contonment		INC	Shiny T	UDF
Udayamarthandapuram		INC	Dhanya S	UDF
Thamarakulam		INC	A.K. Hafeez	UDF
Port		INC	Vincy Baiju	UDF
Kaikulangara		INC	Preetha J	UDF
Cutchery		BJP	Shashikala Rao	NDA
Thangassery		INC	Dr. Udaya Sukumaran	UDF
Thirumullavaram		INC	Udaya Thulasidharan	UDF
Mulankadakam		INC	Ranjith Kalungumukham	UDF
Alattukavu		CPI(M)	Rajashree M	LDF
Kannimel West		BJP	Ajith Chozhathil	NDA
Kannimel		CPI(M)	P.J. Rajendran	LDF

== Elections ==
The first local body election after Kollam municipality was upgraded to a corporation took place in 2000.

=== Corporation Election 2025 ===
S.No.	Party name	Party symbol	Number of Corporators	Change
1.	UDF		27	▲18
2.	LDF		16	▼23
3.	BJP		12	▲6
4.	OTHERS		01	Steady
Total			56	

=== Corporation Election 2020 ===
S.No.	Party name	Party symbol	Number of Corporators	Change
1.	LDF		39	▲3
3.	UDF		09	▼7
3.	BJP		06	▲4
4.	OTHERS		01	Steady
Total			55	

=== Corporation Election 2015 ===
S.No.	Party name	Party symbol	Number of Corporators	Change
1.	LDF		36	▲2
3.	UDF		16	▼3
3.	BJP		02	▲2
4.	IND		01	▼1
Total			55	

=== Election history ===
Since the incorporation of the KMC in 2000, only the LDF has been in power.

Year of election	LDF	UDF	NDA	Others	Total seats	Winner	Source
2025	16	27	12	1	55	UDF ▲18	
2020	39	9	6	1	55	LDF ▲3	
2015	36	16	2	1	55	LDF ▲2	
2010	34	19	0	2	55	LDF ▼2	
2005	36	10	0	6	52	LDF ▲11	
2000	25	20	0	5	50	LDF	

Prior to formation of the Municipal Corporation, Kollam was a Municipality and in the last elections held to the municipality in 1995 LDF was the winner.

=== Electorate ===
As per the voters list published in 2020 November, there were around 2,88,804 eligible voters (1,38,820 male voters, 1,49,984 female voters).

== Mayors of Kollam ==
Mayors of Kollam
Incumbent	From	Until	Party
Sabitha Beegam	5 October 2000	30 September 2005	CPI(M)
N. Padmalochanan	6 October 2005	25 February 2010	CPI(M)
V. Rajendrababu	16 March 2010	1 October 2010	CPI(M)
Prasanna Earnest	9 November 2010	7 November 2014	CPI(M)
Honey Benjamin	25 November 2014	31 October 2015	CPI
V. Rajendrababu	18 November 2015	20 November 2019	CPI(M)
Honey Benjamin	16 December 2019	4 November 2020	CPI
Prasanna Earnest	27 December 2020	10 February 2025	CPI(M)
Honey Benjamin	28 February 2025	13 December 2025	CPI
A. K. Hafeez	26 December 2025	Present	INC

In 2000, Sabitha Beegum became the first Muslim mayor in Kerala and she was one of the youngest person to become mayor in India then. In 2010, then mayor N. Padmalochanan from CPI(M) had to step down from his post following a controversy surrounding him attending an RSS event. In 2025, Prassana Earnest had to step down and make way for a CPI mayor following protest from the alliance partner of LDF.

== Former Municipal Chairmen of Old Quilon Municipality ==
Former Municipal Chairmen of Old Quilon Municipality
Incumbent	From	Until	Party/Profession
Adv. C. Sankara Menon	1921	1922	
Barrister Padmanabhapillai	1922	1925	
M. R. Govinda Pillai	1925	1927	
M. R. Madhava Varrier	1927	1930	Lawyer, Quilon Labour Union (1928), Travancore State Congress (1938)
Paravoor Narayana Pillai	1930	1932	
K. G. Parameswaran Pillai	1932	1948	
Adv. Palakasseri Raghavan	1948	1952	INC
P. R. Kochukrishna Pillai	1952	1956	
Adv. K. Kesavan Potti	1956	1960	
Sankaranarayanan Potti	1960	1962	
T. K. Divakaran	1962	1967	RSP
S. Abdul Rahuman Koya	15 March 1967	29 April 1968	
Adv. N. Thankappan	13 May 1968	7 March 1980	INC
Karumalil Sukumaran	2 June 1980	7 May 1982	INC
K. Thankappan	28 August 1982	22 November 1983	CPI(M)
C. Raghavan Pillai	1 December 1983	29 September 1984	
Gopal Krishna Pillai	26 October 1984	10 April 1985	( IAS officer appointed by Govt.)
C. V. Ananda Bose IAS	26 April 1985	9 July 1987	( IAS officer appointed by Govt.)
Neelagangadharan IAS	5 August 1987	4 February 1988	( IAS officer appointed by Govt.)
Karumalil Sukumaran	17 November 1988	30 September 1995	INC
K. Thankappan	4 October 1995	1 April 1998	CPI(M)
Prof. N. G. Moorthy	4 May 1998	5 October 1999	
Uliyakovil Sasi	29 October 1999	30 September 2000	CPI

The Chinnakada Clock Tower was constructed in 1944 as tribute to then chairman K.G. Parameshwaran Pillai.

== Kollam Corporation projects under construction/ completed ==
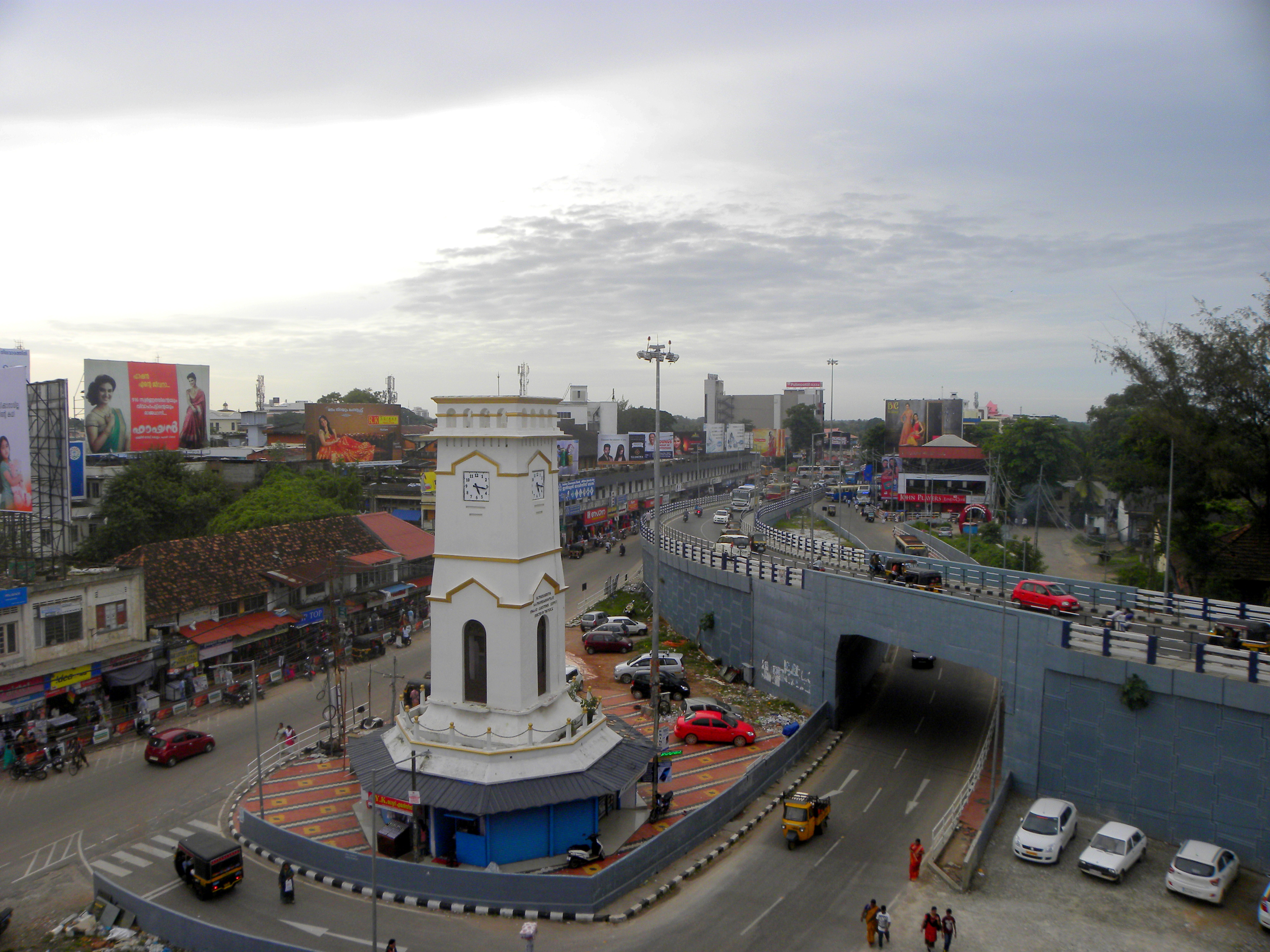
Chinnakada Underpass and Clocktower

=== Chinnakada Underpass ===
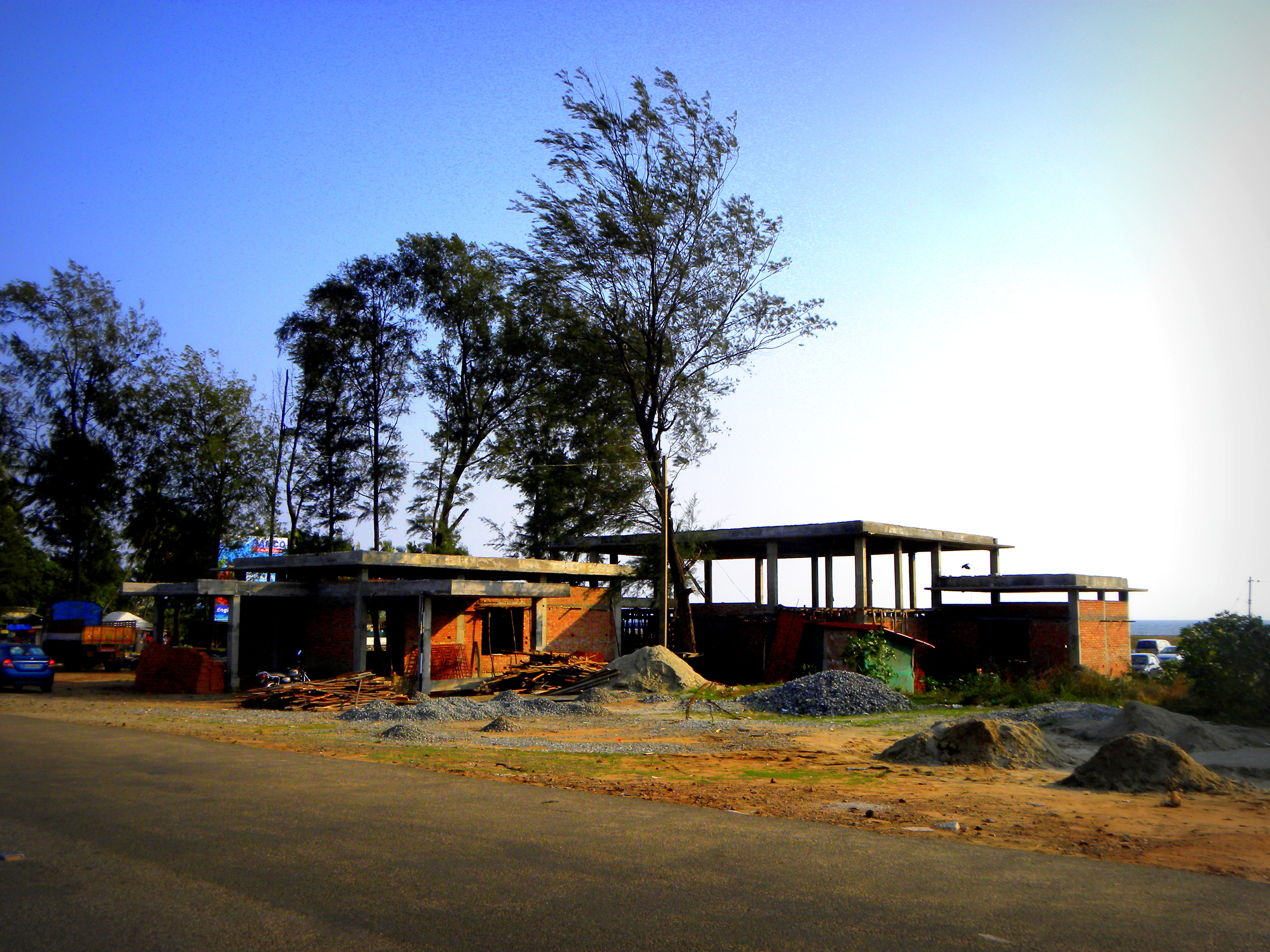
Marine Aquarium under construction at Kollam Beach

The Chinnakada underpass is a public road infrastructure project for the city of Kollam, as part of the Kerala Sustainable Urban Development Project. It is supported by the Asian Development Bank (ADB) to ease traffic congestion at Chinnakada, the city CBD of Kollam. The presence of an existing railway over-bridge and three close intersections with heavy traffic limits options for traffic management measures, including junction improvement. This caused the authorities to conceptualize the underpass at Chinnakada. Chinnakada is a complex junction where roads from Thiruvananthapuram, Alappuzha, Downtown, Sengottai, Ashramam(Residency Road), Kollam Beach and the City bus stand road meet.

The preliminary design prepared for the underpass by the National Transportation Planning and Research Centre (NATPAC) involved the acquisition of 0.08 hectares (0.20 acres) of government land on a temporary basis. The height of the road passage above the underpass was increased to 5.5 metres (18 ft) from 5 metres (16 ft) to facilitate movement of modern container trucks through the underpass. The underpass was opened to the public at the end of May 2015.

=== Marine Aquarium at Kollam Beach ===
On 22 June 2014, construction work started on a marine aquarium at Kollam Beach—the first of its kind in the state of Kerala. The Harbour Engineering Department constructed the aquarium on the eastern side of the beach for the KMC. The foundation stone for the project was laid in March 2014 and it was inaugurated on 14 July 2019. The aquarium has 24 tanks worth Rs. 25 lakh, a pool with a 12,000-litre capacity, and 18 varieties of fish. The facility is open to the public in the evenings.

== Popular activities/ achievements ==
- ISO 9001:2015 certification: In May 2019, Kollam City Corporation achieved the ISO 9001: 2015 certification for the best municipal administration and services.
- IUDI Conclave: The city hosted a three-day national conclave, 'Kollam City Vision', 20–22 September 2019. Jointly organised by the KMC and the Institute of Urban Designers India (IUDI), this was the second-ever IUDI conclave and the first one outside New Delhi.
- E-governance facilities: On 4 November 2019, the KMC launched the Intelligent Property Management System (IPMS) to regulate the recording and tax-filing of properties, and Integrated Management System (IMS), an e-governance facility. A touch-screen ‘information kiosk’ has been placed in front of the KMC headquarters in Kollam Cantonment for the public to clear their queries, track applications and search for information. A digital screen, replacing notice boards, has been placed inside the office to provide information to the public.

== Recognition and criticism ==
In 2014, Mrs. Prasanna Earnest, then-mayor of Kollam was selected as the Best Lady Mayor of South India by the Rotary Club of Trivandrum Royal. She has also faced criticism for nepotism towards her husband X Earnest and lack of governance in the city. In September 2023, Thozhilurappu Workers staged protest against her for non payment of wages and they were met with police brutality.

The City Corporation is widely criticized for not developing physical infrastructure in the city in proportion to its rising population and traffic. Kollam is the only city corporation in Kerala without a proper Bus station. The major roads leading to the city from neighborhood and nearby towns such as Kottiyam, Kavanad, Kannanalloor, Kundara, Anchalumoodu are narrow and has not seen any major development in last three decades. The Olayilkadavu Bridge that could neither land properly on other side nor be opened partially for three years was subjected to wide Social media criticism. The corporation face public ire for not catering civic amenities like street lightings, waste management etc. in an effective manner. The poor governance combined with decline of manufacturing sector has led to stagnation in economy and increase in poverty and crimes. The CPIM leadership in corporation invited criticism in 2024 for hindering Kollam Junction railway station redevelopment.

The corporation faced criticism over poor waste management at Kureepuzha Chandi Depot and also for polluting Ramsar site, Ashtamudi Lake. In 2021 following National Green Tribunal directive the corporation carried out extensive Biomining in the area.

== See also ==
- Kollam
- Kollam District
- Kollam Lok Sabha constituency
- Kollam Assembly Constituency
- 2020 Kollam Municipal Corporation election
- People's Planning in Kerala
