= Kollam Development Authority =

Autonomous statutory body responsible for the development of Kollam city, India

- കൊല്ലം വികസന സമിതി Quilon Development Authority
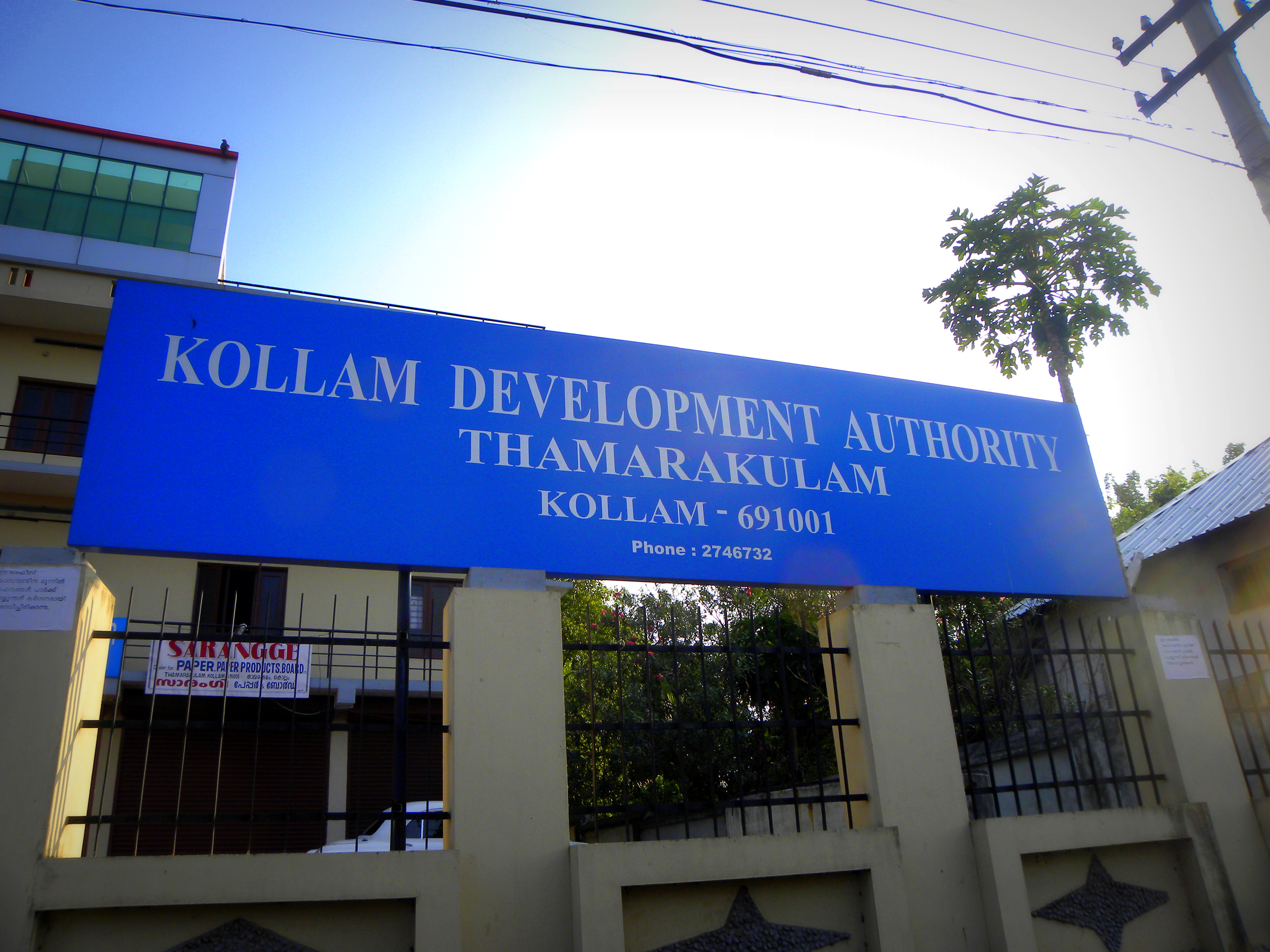
- Denotation board for Kollam Development Authority

Agency overview
- Formed: 1981
- Dissolved: 2016
- Type: Urban Development and Planning
- Jurisdiction: Government of Kerala
- Headquarters: Thamarakulam, Kollam City, Kerala
- Agency executive: A.K Hafees, Chairman
- Parent agency: Government of Kerala

Kollam Development Authority (KDA) was an autonomous statutory body overseeing the development of the City of Kollam in the state of Kerala, India. KDA was the responsible body for the planning and development of the major parts of Kollam urban area which consists of the City corporation of Kollam and its surrounding areas like Eravipuram, Sakthikulangara, Neendakara, Uliyakovil, Anchalumoodu, Kottiyam etc. KDA was one of the 5 significant city development authorities in Kerala which gained in significance because of the importance of the City of Kollam as the emerging 'Port City of Kerala'.

== History ==
Government of Kerala constituted Kollam Development Authority (KDA) in 1981, under Town Planning Act. In 2007, the Government of Kerala wound up the Kollam Development Authority, along with the Kozhikode, Thrissur, Idukki and Varkala development authorities. After 5 year, in 2012, the Government of Kerala reconstituted KDA along with Kozhikode and Thrissur development authorities. In 7 April 2013, Government of Kerala has appointed A.K Hafees as the Chairman of Kollam Development Authority(KDA). In September 2016, Government of Kerala has decided to disband Kollam Development Authority.

== Proposals from Kollam Development Authority ==
Government of Kerala have organized an urban development meet in the name 'Partner Kerala' during the month February, 2014. Kollam development Authority proposed 10 projects in that meet for the development of Kollam Urban Area. They are,

- Organized park and open space, Thirumullavaram
- Organized park and open space, Thangassery
- Re-development of Payikkada commercial area in the city.
- Beautification of TS Canal – Kollam Boat Jetty to Eravipuram Thottumugham
- Junction Improvement Project – Kadappakada Junction
- Junction Improvement Project – High School Junction
- Mobility Hub Opposite to Public Library, Kollam
- Oceanarium at Kollam Beach
- Road Development Project – From new SP office Railway Over Bridge to Vellayittambalam
- Shopping Mall, Office Complex and Exhibition cum – Trading Centre for Micro Small and Medium Enterprises at Thamarakulam

=== Commercial Complex cum Convention Centre Project at Thamarakulam ===
On 31 December 2015, Kerala Chief Minister Oommen Chandy laid foundation stone for Kollam Development Authority's Commercial Complex cum convention centre project at Thamarakulam in Kollam city. The project would be constructed and operated on the private-public partnership basis on a 2.35 acres of land. The aim of this Commercial Complex project is to expand the commercial hub of the city of Kollam towards west from the traditional Chinnakada-Chamakada hubs.

== See also ==
- Kollam
- Kollam Beach
- Kollam Port
- Kollam Pooram
- Lal Bahadur Shastri Stadium, Kollam
