= Kallupalam =

19th century stone bridge

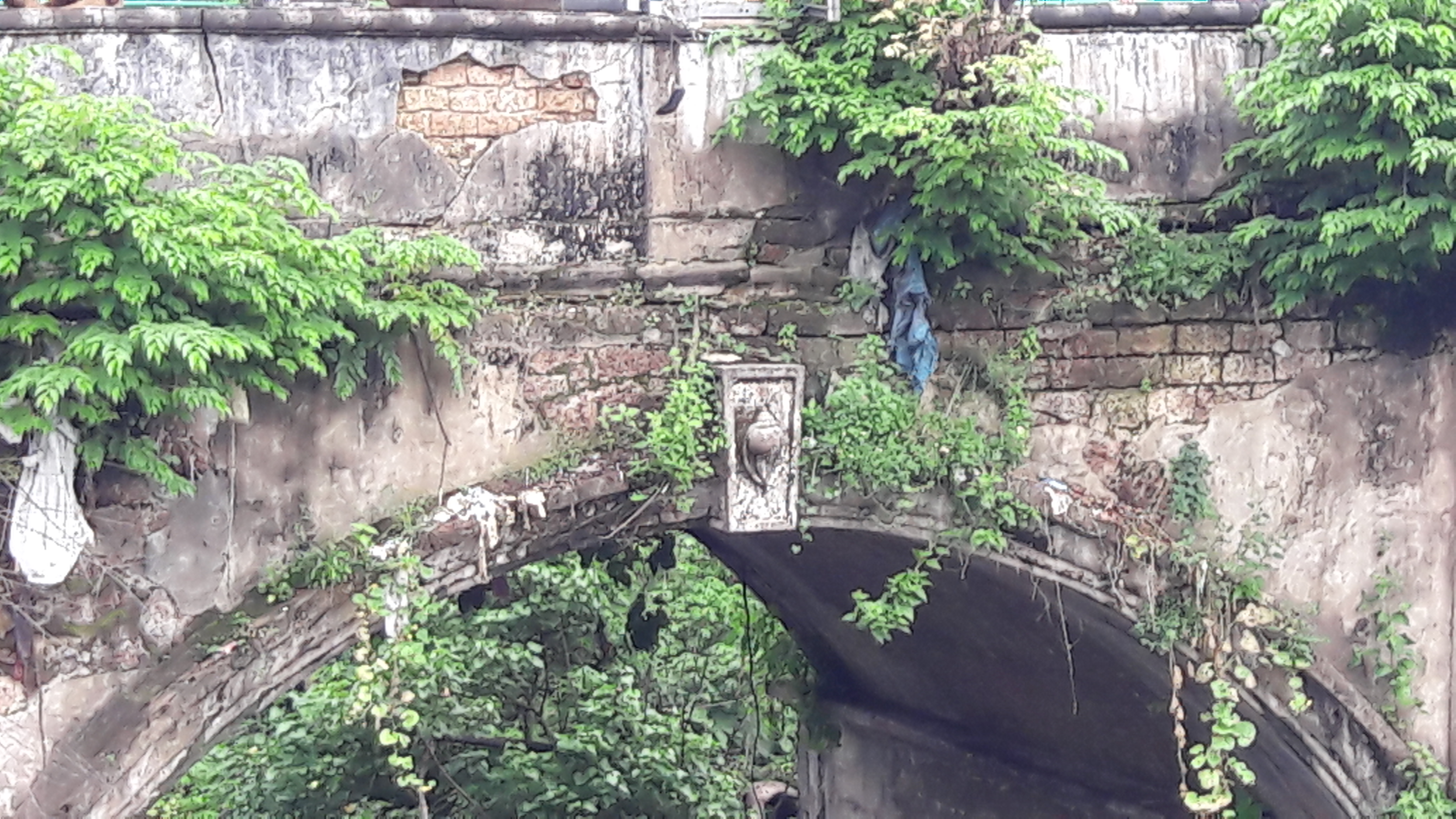
Kallupalam

Kallupalam (Stone Bridge) was a 19th-century stone bridge in Kollam City, Kerala, India. Situated in the central business district of Kollam (about 1 km from Chinnakkada), connecting areas like Chamakkada and Lakshminada across the Kollam Canal.

It was built in the 1820s during the reign of Travancore Regent Sethu Parvathi Bayi, and under the supervision of Dewan Venkata Rao, when the Kollam Canal was dug to connect Paravur Lake and Ashtamudi Lake. The bridge was famous for carrying the royal Shankhu Mudhra (the sacred conch emblem of Travancore) carved into its structure.

== Rebuilding ==
The aging historic structure was planned for demolition and rebuilding around 2019 to revive inland navigation along the Kovalam-Kollam State Waterway, with a new replacement bridge designed to retain traditional architectural elements like the royal shankhu mudhra.
