= Chinese trade with Kollam =

Chinese trade with Kollam refers to the historical, maritime mercantile and diplomatic relationship between various Chinese imperial dynasties and the ancient port city of Kollam (historically known as Quilon or Desinganadu) on the southwestern coast of India (modern-day Kerala). Peaking between the 8th and 15th centuries CE, Kollam served as a vital international entrepôt and the premier western transshipment hub for massive Chinese junks crossing the Indian Ocean.

The trade profile between Kollam and China was highly structured, operating on mutual demands for goods that were otherwise unavailable in their respective native ecosystems. The central business district of modern Kollam, Chinnakada, is widely considered by historians to be an etymological corruption of China-Kada (meaning "Chinese Market" or "China Bazaar". Records show missions sent as early as 1282 CE to the Chinese port of Zaytoun. Accordingto the records of the T’ang dynasty (618-913), Kollam was their chief settlement. Ma Huan refers to the products and coinage of Kollam. He records that Kollam was very familiar to the navigators of T’ang dynasty.

== Diplomatic relations ==
The economic interdependency translated into active, high-level diplomatic missions, particularly during the Song, Yuan, and Ming dynasties. In his 9th-century geographical compendium The Book of Routes and Realms, Persian official Ibn Khurdadbeh noted that massive Chinese ships arriving at Kollam Malay were assessed a premium port toll of 1,000 dirhams, highlighting the immense fiscal value of Chinese merchant vessels to the local exchequer.

=== Embassies with Kublai Khan ===
In 1282 CE, Kublai Khan, the founder of the Yuan dynasty, dispatched an official imperial emissary to the court of Kollam. In return, the Desinganadu rajas sent a retaliatory diplomatic mission to China's primary port city of Zaitoun (Quanzhou), led by a prominent local Syrian Christian merchant.

Notable medieval travelers confirmed the scale of this alliance. Marco Polo, serving as an envoy for the Yuan dynasty court, visited Kollam in 1292 CE and wrote extensively about its wealth. In the early 14th century, Moroccan scholar Ibn Battuta ranked Kollam as one of the five finest ports he encountered across his two-decade global expeditions, explicitly attributing its grandeur to the Chinese trade network.

== Archaeological findings ==
Modern maritime and terrestrial archaeological digs have provided physical authentication of the written historical records. In January 2014, excavations near the Tangasseri coast yielded thousands of ancient Chinese coins alongside Stone Age tools. Collaborative numismatic studies proved that these coins spanned several centuries—ranging from the Tang to the Ming dynasties—verifying unbroken commercial engagement. Vast deposits of authentic Chinese celadon, blue-and-white porcelain, and heavy stoneware shards have been systematically recovered from the seabed around Kollam Port, suggesting an engulfed or submerged medieval coastal commercial district.
