= Andamukkam =

Andamukkam Aandamukkam
- Neighbourhood
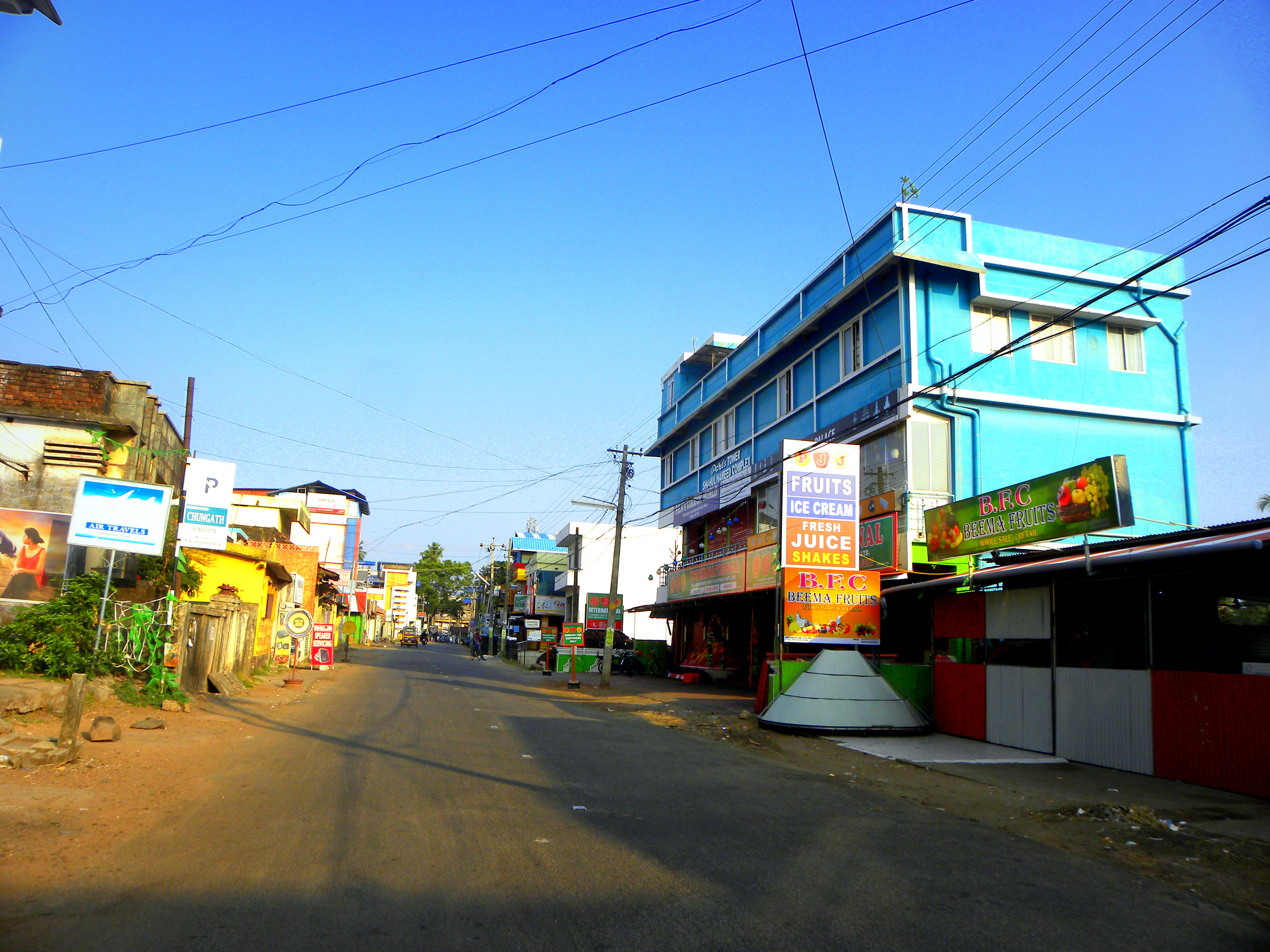
- Andamukkam

- Location in Kollam, India Andamukkam (Kerala) Andamukkam (India)
- Coordinates: 8.884466°N 76.589775°E
- Country: India
- State: Kerala
- District: Kollam

Government
  - Body: Kollam Municipal Corporation(KMC)

Languages
  - Official: Malayalam, English
- Time zone: UTC+5:30 (IST)
- PIN: 691001
- Vehicle registration: KL-02
- Lok Sabha constituency: Kollam
- Civic agency: Kollam Municipal Corporation
- Avg. summer temperature: 34 °C (93 °F)
- Avg. winter temperature: 22 °C (72 °F)
- Website: http://www.kollam.nic.in

Andamukkam or Aandamukkam is a neighbourhood of Kollam city in Kerala, India. It is a part of Downtown Kollam. Andamukkam is one of the prime commercial centres of Kollam city, which was once the most important port city of India. The city bus stand in Kollam is in Andamukkam. Proximity of Andamukkam with other neighbourhoods of Kollam is making it a prime commercial centre and transportation hub of the city.

== Business and commercialization in Andamukkam ==
Andamukkam is a part of the central business district of Kollam. Most of the print and media publication offices of the city operate in Andamukkam. One of the three regional offices of the Kerala Public Service Commission and their district office are in Andamukkam The other regional offices of the Kerala Public Service Commission are in Ernakulam and Kozhikode. Many registered advertisers and agents operate in Andamukkam.

== Institutions near Andamukkam ==
- City Bus Stand
- Kerala Public Service Commission regional and district offices
- Corporation Building
- Hotel Naani

== See also ==
- Kollam
- Chinnakada Clock Tower
- Chinnakada
- Andamukkam City Bus Stand
