= Chinnakada Clock Tower =

Clock tower in Kollan City, India

- Kollam Clock Tower
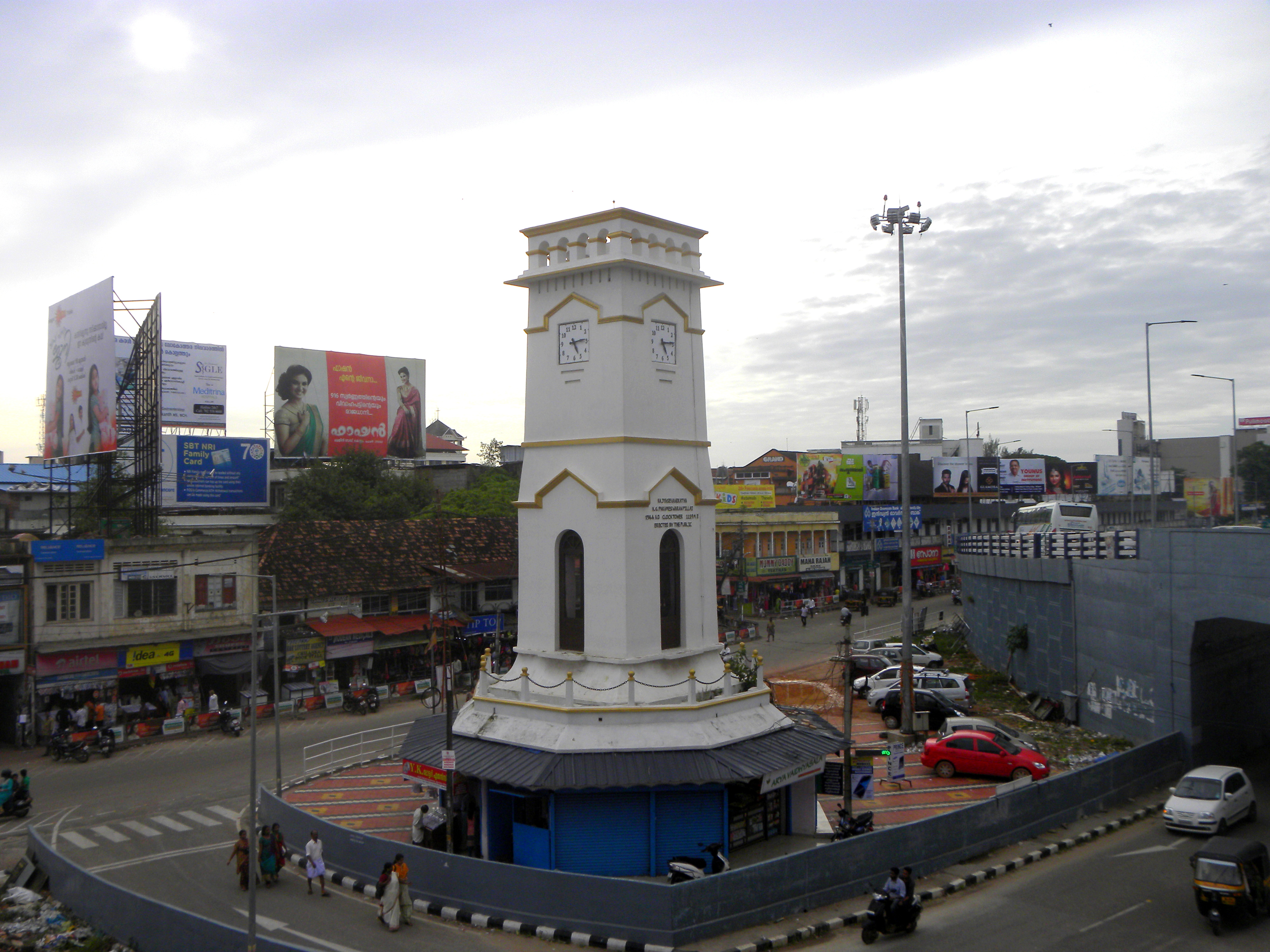
- Clock Tower in Chinnakada, Kollam
- Interactive map of Chinnakada Clock Tower
- Location: Chinnakada, Kollam
- Coordinates: 8°53′07″N 76°35′28″E
- Type: Memorial
- Material: Brick and white cement
- Opening date: 1944
- Dedicated to: K.G. Parameswaran Pillai (former Kollam Municipal Chairman)

Chinnakada Clock Tower is a landmark in Kollam City in the Indian state of Kerala. In Chinnakada, the tower lies in the heart of the city, close to Kollam Junction Railway Station. As the first clock tower in the erstwhile Travancore state, it has become a non-official emblem of the city and the major landmark of Kollam.

== History ==
The quadrangular clock tower was built in 1944 by the natives as a tribute to Unichakam Veedu K G Parameshwaran Pillai, the former chairman of Kollam Municipality (1932–48). Construction began in 1941 and was completed three years later in brick and white cement. The tower has four clocks facing the four directions of the city, which were brought from Kolkata.

== Importance ==
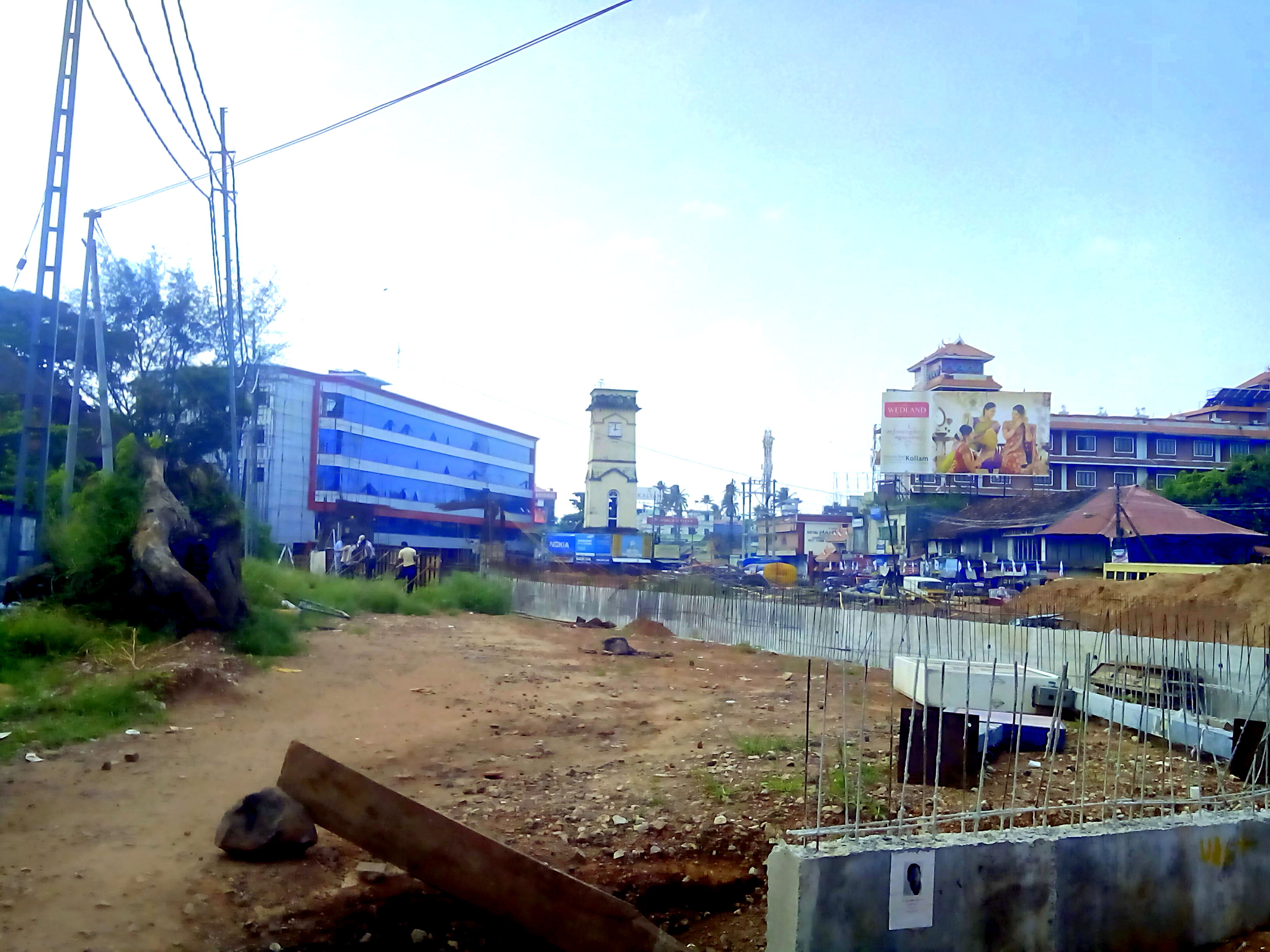
Underpass works and Chinnakada Clock Tower

Chinnakkada is considered the heart of the Kollam and one of the major junctions in the city where National Highway – NH 66 (earlier NH 47) meets NH 744 (earlier NH 208). Because of the presence of a huge traffic circle, it became one of the busiest junctions in the state. To reduce the traffic congestion in Chinnakada, Kollam Municipal Corporation is constructing an underpass near the clock tower. The complex junction is the meeting point of roads from Thiruvananthapuram, Alappuzha, Sengottai, Ashramam, Kollam Beach and Kollam Port, Downtown Kollam and the City Bus Stand.

The development of the Chinnakada area including the clock tower is the most important junction development project by the municipal corporation. The works have been initiated by the shifting of city bus stand to Andamukkam. The former Left Democratic Front Government of Kerala decided to develop Kollam as an international city using Delhi's Chandni Chowk as a model. The proposed complex was designed as a trade centre for products of the traditional industries in the district.

== Renovation ==
Kollam Municipal Corporation has allocated Rs. 2 million to renovate the clock tower. Work on the project has finished.

== See also ==
- Kollam
- Chinnakada
- List of clock towers
- Kollam Port
- Kollam Junction Railway Station
