= Thamarakulam =

Thamarakulam Thamarakkulam
- Neighbourhood
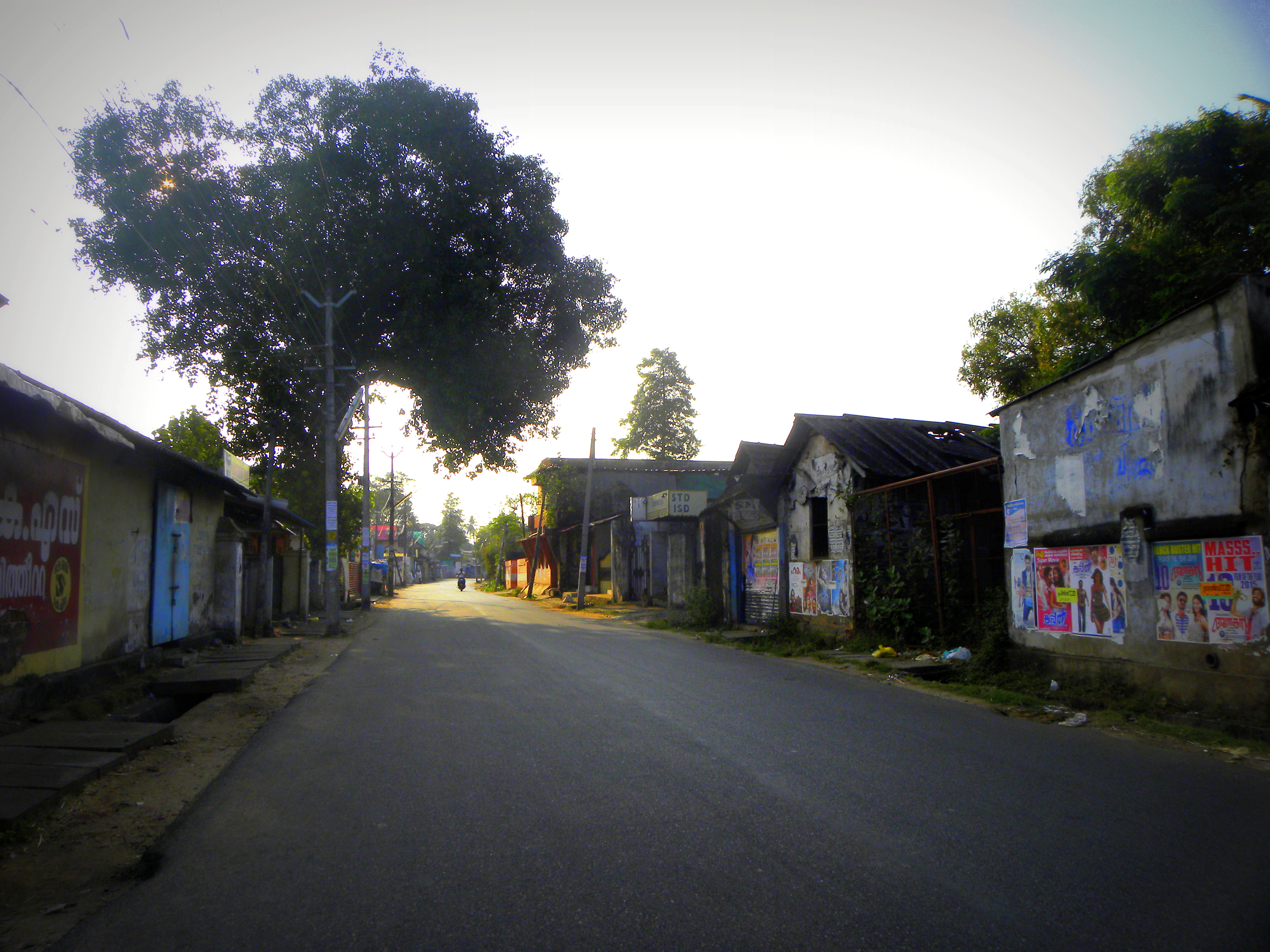
- Road towards Downtown Kollam area, Thamarakulam

- Location in Kerala, India
- Coordinates: 8.883566°N 76.586412°E
- Country: India
- State: Kerala
- District: Kollam

Government
  - Body: Kollam Municipal Corporation(KMC)

Languages
  - Official: Malayalam, English
- Time zone: UTC+5:30 (IST)
- PIN: 691001
- Vehicle registration: KL-02
- Lok Sabha constituency: Kollam
- Civic agency: Kollam Municipal Corporation
- Avg. summer temperature: 34 °C (93 °F)
- Avg. winter temperature: 22 °C (72 °F)
- Website: http://www.kollam.nic.in

Thamarakulam or Thamarakkulam is a business centre and neighbourhood of Kollam city in Kerala, India. Thamarakulam is a part of Downtown Kollam area and is near Chinnakada.

== Temple ==
Ganapathy temple in Thamarakulam is a very famous Hindu temple and worship centre in Kollam district. The caparisoned elephants from this temple are exhibited publicly during the celebrations of Kollam Pooram. The Ezhunnellippu of elephants from Thamarakulam temple is a regular ritual of Kollam Pooram, witnessed by thousands of spectators.

== Local authority ==
The Kollam Development Authority office is situated at Thamarakulam.

== Partner Kerala Meet 2014 ==
The Government of Kerala organized an urban development meet in the name Partner Kerala in February 2014.

The Kollam Municipal Corporation and the Kollam Development Authority submitted a number of proposals for Thamarakulam to the Partner Kerala Meet 2014. These were:

- The Kollam Municipal Corporation unveiled its plan to construct a commercial complex-cum-convention centre and multilevel car parking at Thamarakulam at a total cost of Rs 178.53 crore.
- The Kollam Development Authority proposed a shopping mall, office complex and exhibition-cum-trading centre for micro, small and medium enterprises at Thamarakkulam at a cost of Rs 80 crore.

== See also ==
- Kollam
- Thangassery
- Mundakkal
- Chinnakada
- Andamukkam City Bus Stand
