= Bishop Jerome Nagar =

Shopping complex in the city of Kollam, Kerala

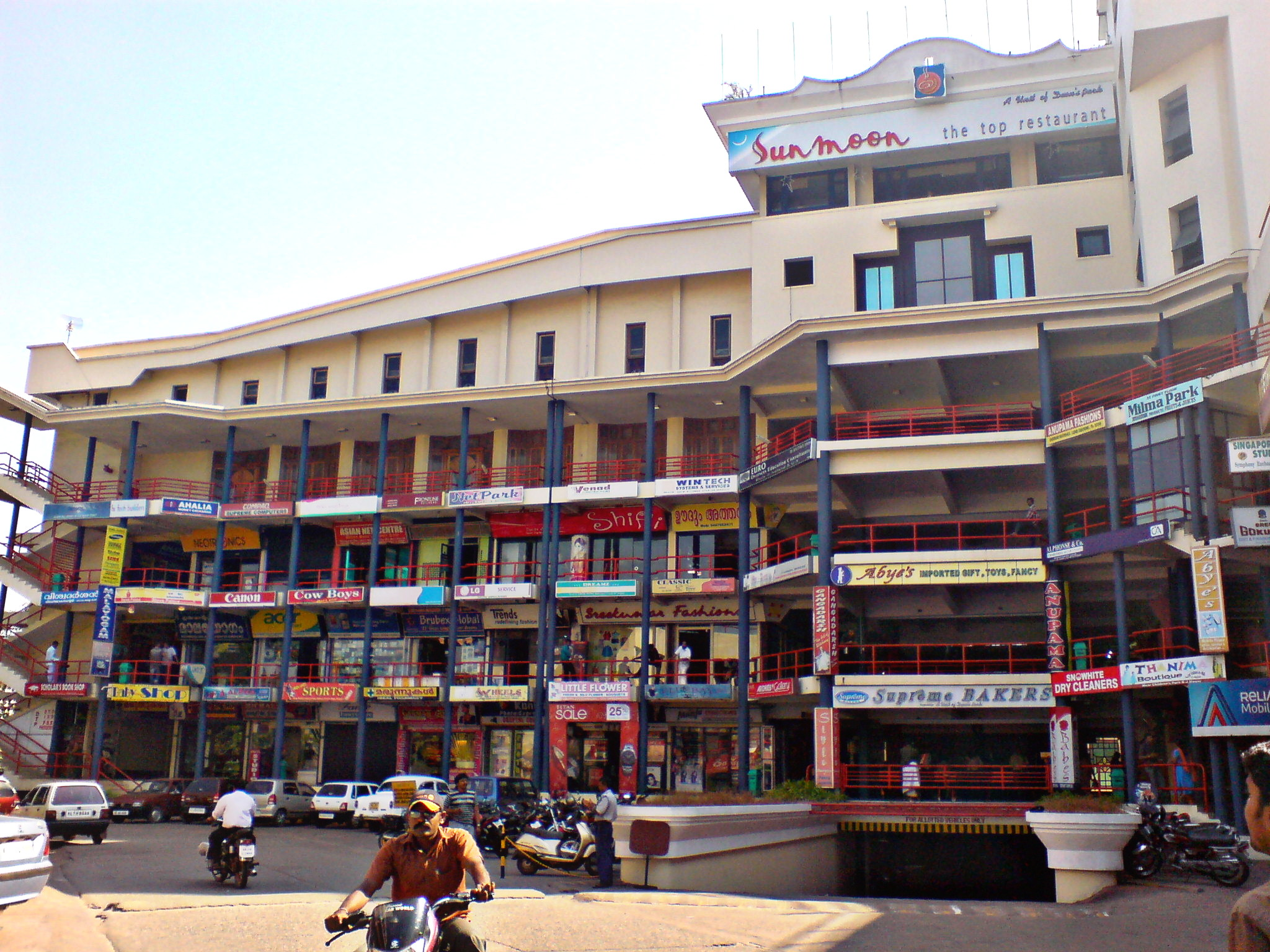
- Front view of Bishop Jerome Nagar
- Location: Chinnakada, Kollam, India
- Coordinates: 8.887277°N 76.588596°E
- Address: Downtown Kollam – 691001
- Opened: 1987
- Owner: Roman Catholic Diocese of Quilon
- Architect: Eugene Pandala
- Num. of stores: 184
- Floors: 7
- Parking: Valet parking, Underground
- Public transit: Kollam KSRTC - 850 m Kollam Junction - 1 km Kollam KSWTD - 850 m
- Website: www.bishopjeromenagar.in

Bishop Jerome Nagar (BJN) is one of the largest shopping complexes in the city of Kollam in the Indian state of Kerala. It is owned by the Roman Catholic Diocese of Quilon, the first Catholic Diocese in India. Bishop Jerome Nagar is one of the main centres for shopping and related activities in Kollam city. A three screen multiplex, run by G-Max Cinemas, is also there at Bishop Jerome Nagar.

== Features ==
- Seven floors (six plus parking)
- 3 screen multiplex
- Escalator
- Valet Parking
