= Sree Maha Ganapathy Temple =

Hindu Temple

Shree Maha Ganapathi Temple
- Location in Kerala

Religion
- Affiliation: Hinduism
- District: Thiruvananthapuram
- Deity: Maha Ganapathy, Lord Shree Dharmasastha, Sree Murugha, Amman Sannidhi
- Festival: Mandala Poja (Sasthapreethi Samaradhana)

Location
- Location: Attingal
- State: Kerala
- Country: India
- Interactive map of Shree Maha Ganapathi Temple
- Coordinates: 8.401775°N 77.087762°E

The Sree Maha Ganapathy temple is located in Thamarakulam, also known as the heart of Kollam. The main deity is Lord Vigneshwara, who is believed to be the person who takes responsibility of the whole region.

== See also ==
- Temples of Kerala
