= Andamukkam City bus stand =

Bus station in Kollam, India

Andamukkam City bus stand ആണ്ടാമുക്കം സിറ്റി ബസ്സ്‌ സ്റ്റാന്‍ഡ്
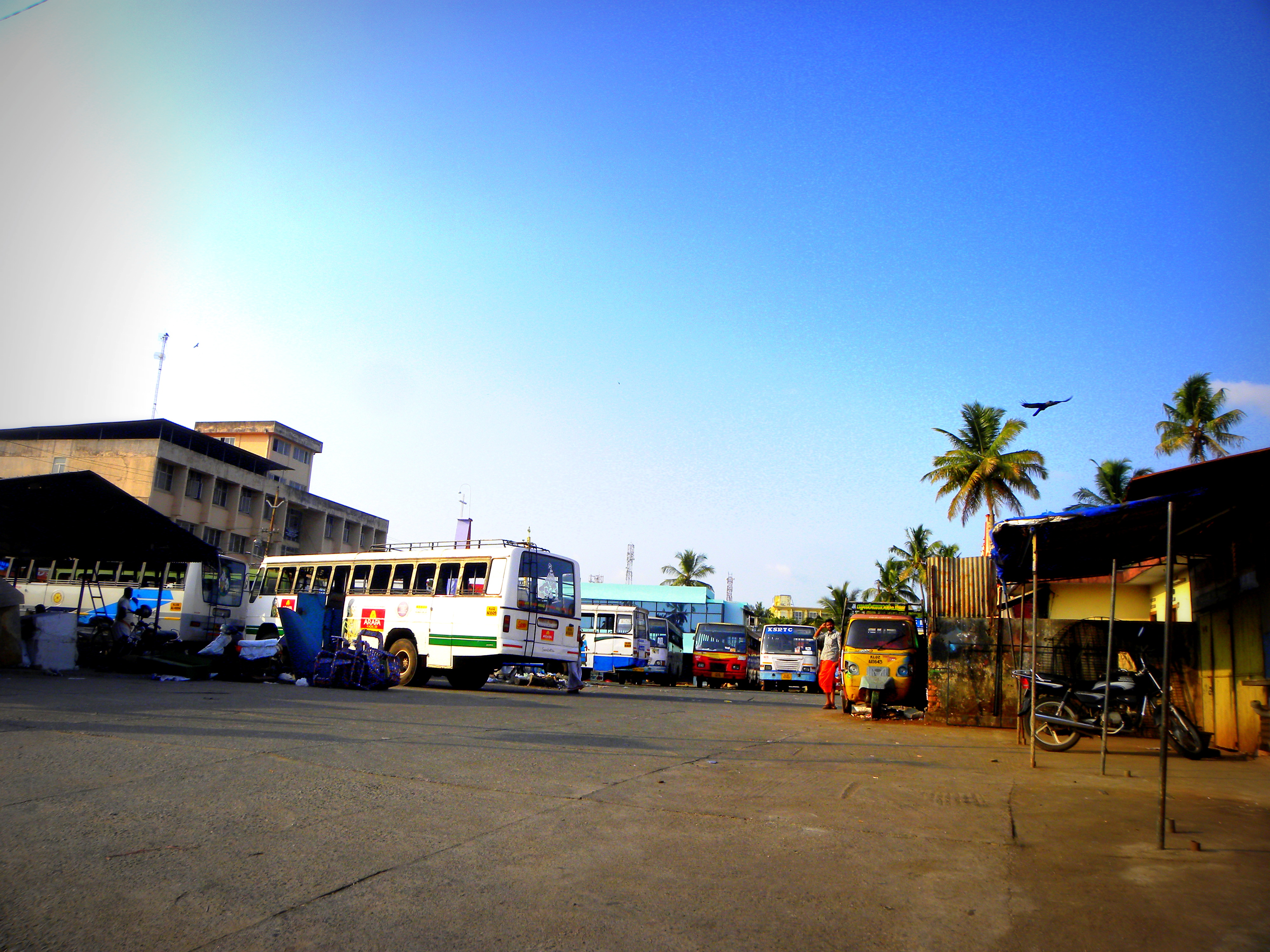
- Andamukkam City bus stand

General information
- Location: Andamukkam, Kollam; India
- Coordinates: 8°52′59.5″N 76°35′20.5″E
- Owner: City corporation of Kollam
- Operator: Kollam Municipal Corporation(KMC)

Construction
- Structure type: At Grade
- Parking: No

History
- Opened: 2008
Location

Andamukkam City bus stand, Kollam, is one of the two bus stands in the city of Kollam in the Indian state of Kerala. Situated in the Downtown Kollam area, it is also known as Andamukkam private bus stand. The bus stand is only for private city buses and Kerala State Road Transport Corporation (KSRTC) ordinary bus services running to Chinnakada. It is the starting point of various city bus services connecting Chinnakada to Mayyanad, Elampalloor, Sakthikulangara, Chavara, Thoppilkadavu, Prakkulam, Kottiyam, Perumon and Kadavoor. KSRTC have plans to start an operations centre at the bus station.

== History ==
Kollam's city bus stand was originally in Chinnakada until in 2006, Kollam Municipal Corporation decided to build an underpass on the former site. The bus station was subsequently moved to Andamukkam in 2008, following a decision by the District Traffic Advisory Committee.

== Private/government institutions near Andamukkam bus stand ==
- Kerala Public Service Commission District Office
- Hotel Naani
- Corporation building, Andamukkam
- Corporation building, Chinnakada
- Quilon Co-operative Urban Bank
