= Pullikada =

Pullikada Pullikkada
- Neighbourhood
- Location in Kollam, India Pullikada (Kerala) Pullikada (India)
- Coordinates: 8.889296°N 76.591787°E
- Country: India
- State: Kerala
- District: Kollam

Government
  - Body: Kollam Municipal Corporation(KMC)

Languages
  - Official: Malayalam, English
- Time zone: UTC+5:30 (IST)
- PIN: 691001
- Vehicle registration: KL-02
- Lok Sabha constituency: Kollam
- Civic agency: Kollam Municipal Corporation
- Avg. summer temperature: 34 °C (93 °F)
- Avg. winter temperature: 22 °C (72 °F)
- Website: http://www.kollam.nic.in

Pullikada or Pullikkada is a neighbourhood of Kollam city in Kerala, India. Pullikada is very close to Chinnakada - the city CBD of Kollam and is a part of Downtown Kollam. The Coconut Development Board of India is planning to start a Coconut Processing Unit in Pullikada.

== Rajiv Awas Yojana Project for Kollam City ==
Pullikada colony is an important slum in the city. Rs.660 Crores Rajiv Awas Yojana project for poverty and slums alleviation is on implementation stage in Kollam. The scheme, which aims at the social, cultural and economic progress of the slum-dwellers, will also provide them houses with water supply, electricity, roads, drainage and other basic amenities. As a pilot project, it would be introduced on SMP Colony in the city and then to Pullikada colony.

== See also ==
- Kollam
- Kollam Junction railway station
- Chinnakada
- Kollam Airport
- Asramam
