= Chamakada =

Chamakada Chamakkada
- Neighbourhood
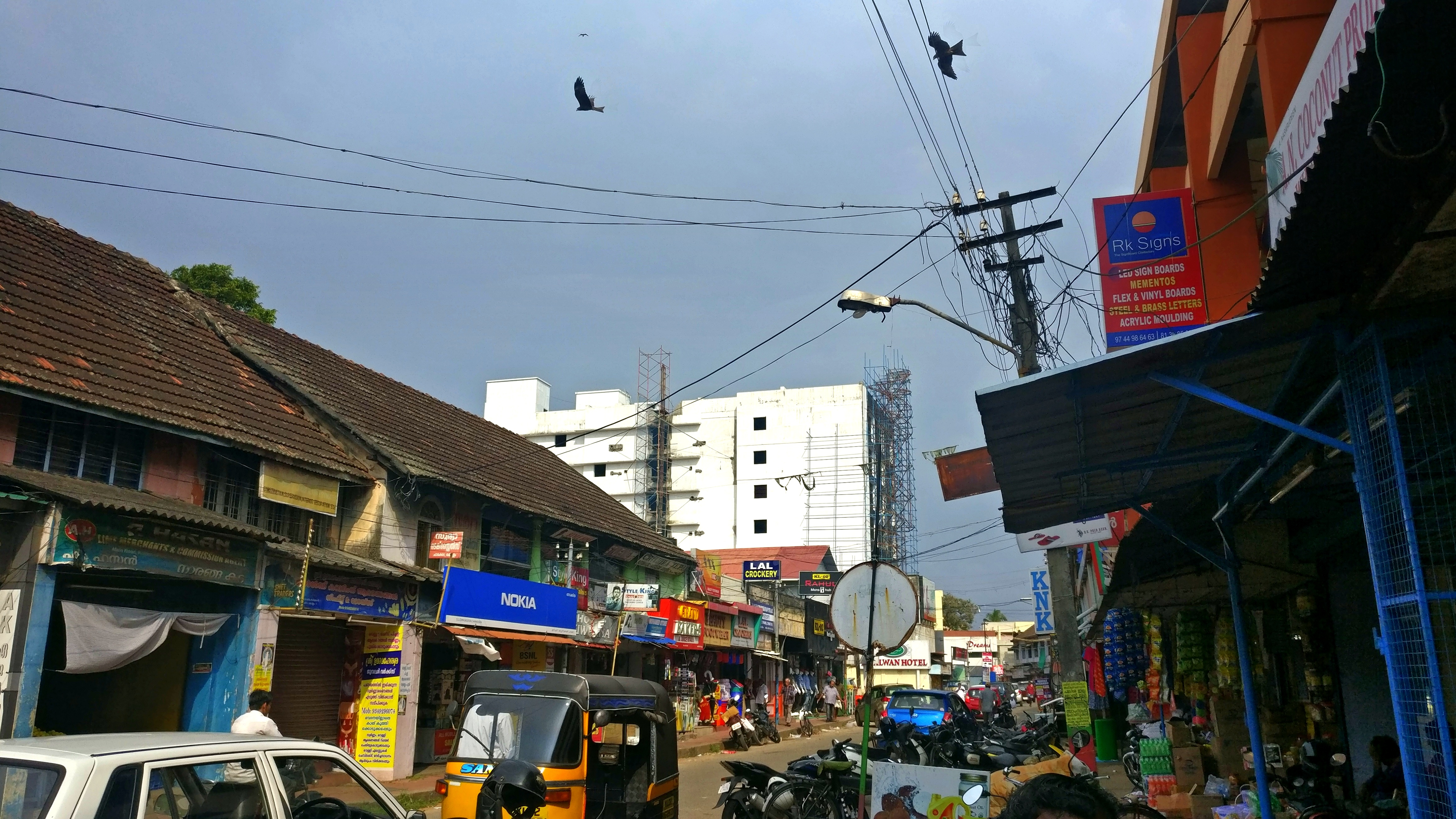
- Busy Main road in Chamakada

- Location in Kollam, India Chamakada (Kerala) Chamakada (India)
- Coordinates: 8.884683°N 76.584040°E
- Country: India
- State: Kerala
- District: Kollam
- City: Kollam

Government
  - Body: Kollam Municipal Corporation(KMC)

Languages
  - Official: Malayalam, English
- Time zone: UTC+5:30 (IST)
- PIN: 691001
- Vehicle registration: KL-02
- Lok Sabha constituency: Kollam
- Civic agency: Kollam Municipal Corporation
- Avg. summer temperature: 34 °C (93 °F)
- Avg. winter temperature: 22 °C (72 °F)
- Website: http://www.kollam.nic.in

Chamakada or Chamakkada is a trade hub of the city of Kollam, India, in the core Downtown Kollam area. The area has wholesale dealers and rice merchants. Chamakada is the second main commercial centre of Kollam city after Chinnakada.

== Economy ==
Chamakada is an export and commercial hub of Kollam city. The ancient Kollam city was one of the famous trade centers. Marco Polo visited Kollam and other towns on the west coast, in his capacity as a Chinese mandarin.

Because of the importance of Chamakada as a trade & export hub, Export Inspection Council of India (EICI) runs a Sub office with lab facility at Chamakada. It is one among the 7 Sub offices of EICI in South India. As an important commercial centre in Kerala, Kerala Fire Force is running a Fire Station at Chamakada.

== Kollam Canal ==
Kollam Canal is part of the Trivandrum-Shornur Canal (TS Canal) system, under the justification of the Inland Navigation Department. It was an arterial inland waterway of old Quilon city and the major trade channel of Travancore. Processed cashew from various factories in the Cashew Capital along with other goods from the wholesale markets of old Quilon city for export was the major export material handled at Chamakada that time.

== See also ==
- Andamukkam
- Kadappakada
