= Kollam Canal =

Canal system in Kollam, India

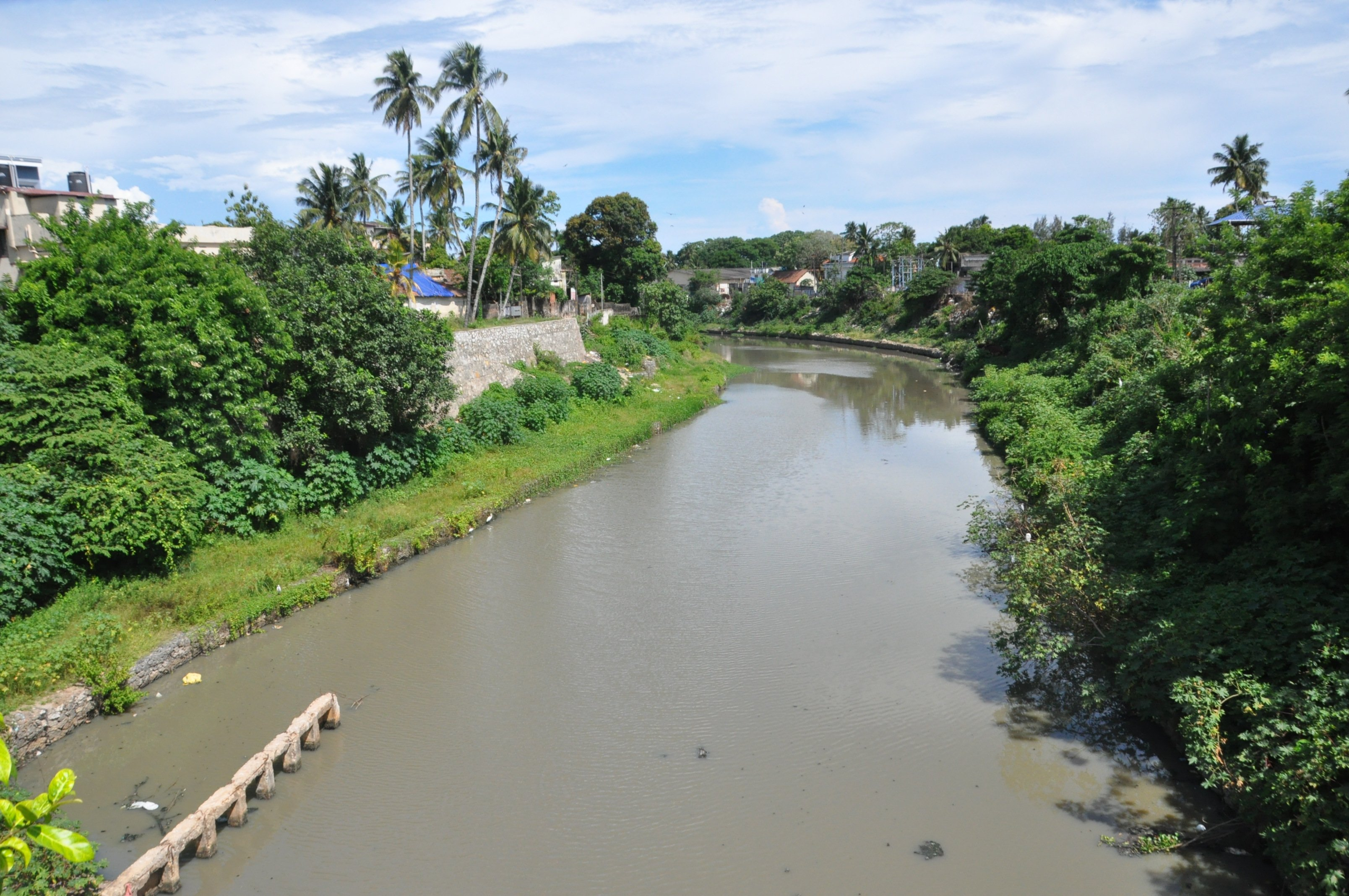
- Kollam Canal at Eravipuram

Specifications
- Length: 7.69 km (4.78 miles) (Part of National Waterway-3)
- Status: Under renovation
- Navigation authority: Kerala Shipping and Inland Navigation Corporation

History
- Date of first use: 1880

Geography
- Start point: Ashtamudi Lake (in the North)
- End point: Paravur Lake (in the South)

Kollam Canal or Quilon Canal or Kollam Thodu is a 7.7 km long canal system passing through the city of Kollam, India. It is a part of National Waterway-3 and 78 km long Kollam-Trivandrum (Kovalam) State waterway project.

== History ==
The Kollam canal was built on 1880 and is a bustling part of 560 km long Thiruvananthapuram–Shoranur canal(TS Canal) waterway project, also used as a means for transport of both people and goods, as an avenue for leisure and the water even used for irrigation and drinking. Kollam Canal was an arterial inland waterway of old Quilon city. It was the major trade channel of Travancore state that time. Giant cargo vessels ferrying different types of goods through this canal were a common view of Quilon city those days. Chamakada section of the canal served as a harbour for unloading the goods brought by these vessels to Kollam. Processed cashew from various factories in the Cashew Capital along with other goods from the wholesale markets of old Quilon city for export was the major export material handled at Chamakada that time.

== Relevance and developments ==
Kollam Canal is a part of Kollam Canal development project. Authorities have already spent ₹13 crore on renovating and reviving Kollam Canal. There are several ferry stations and jetty along this 7.7 km stretch. The Kollam Canal development project is expected to meet the water transportation and irrigation needs of the people of Kollam Urban Agglomeration in future.

The canal is connecting Asramam, Cutchery, Chamakada, Pallithottam, Kochupilamoodu, Mundakkal, Eravipuram, Mayyanad, Thanni & Paravur in Kollam Metropolitan Area. Along with Kollam Canal, National Waterway 3 and Inland Waterways Authority of India are also serving Kollam Metropolitan Area.

The transportation system through Kollam Canal is intended for providing facilities for passenger and cargo transportation at cheaper rates. The waterway has tremendous tourism potential too. It connects Ashtamudi Lake with Varkala, Kovalam, Kadinamkulam through Paravur kayal and TS Canal.

A full-fledged intra-city water transportation system, as like the one existing in the city of Venice can be implemented in Kollam Metropolitan Area. The canal is suitable for launching Water Metro in Kollam. It is also a crucial link to connect Kollam Port with the Inland Waterways Authority of India's Kollam Inland Terminal.

== Controversies ==
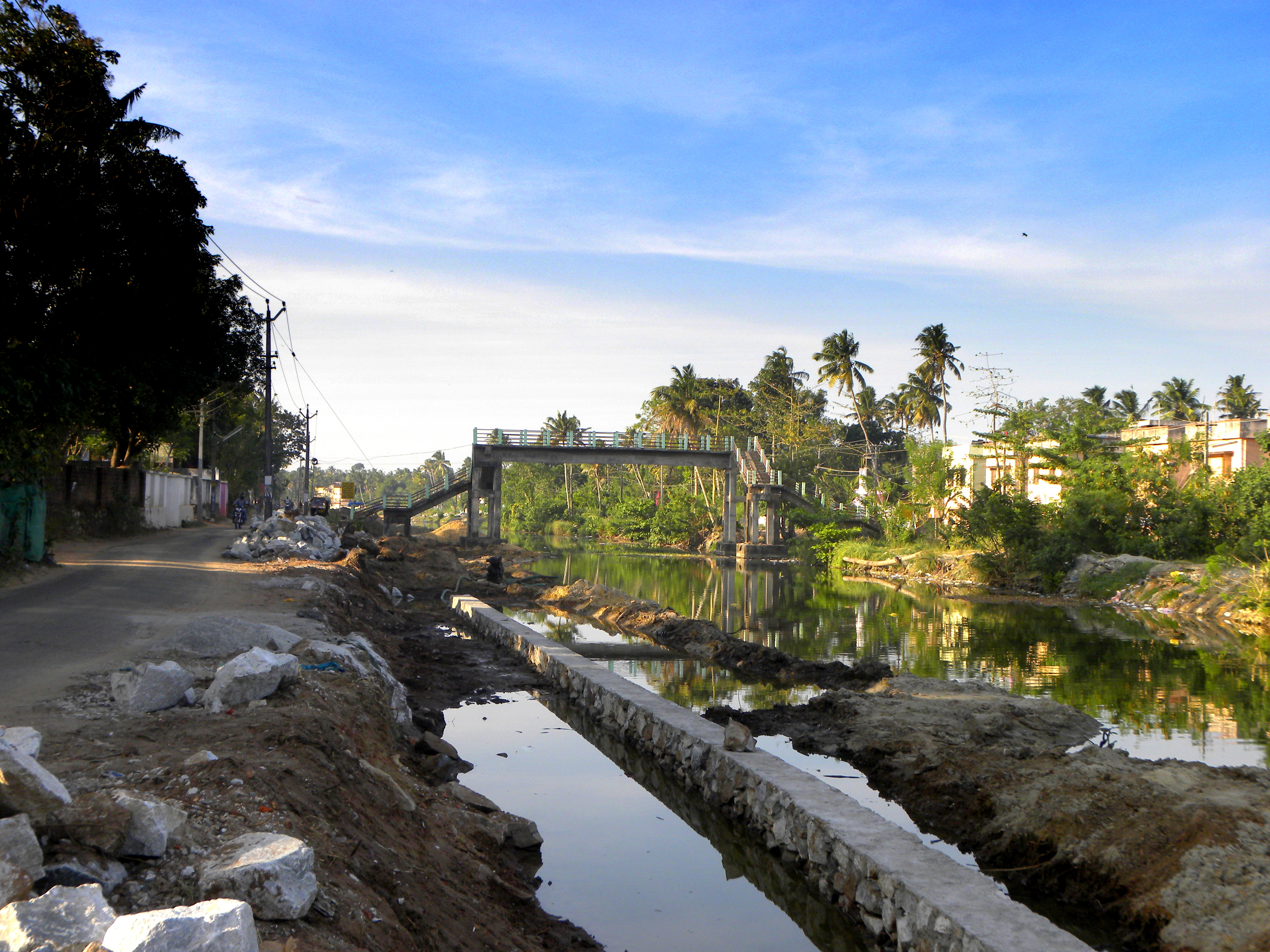
Kollam Canal near Eravipuram

The development activities of Kollam Thodu is happening in a very slow pace. There are allegations about sand mining happening instead of channel development and misappropriation of development funds. The canal is used as dumping ground in various parts by shops and establishments in the area. A bridge which was under construction over Kollam Canal near Chamakada called Kallupalam collapsed while construction injuring a worker.

== See also ==
- Kollam
- Buckingham Canal
- Kollam KSWTD Ferry Terminal
- Ashtamudi Lake
- Paravur Lake
