= Thrissur Development Authority =

Statutory body in India

- തൃശൂർ വികസന സമിതി

Agency overview
- Formed: 1981
- Dissolved: 2016
- Type: Urban planning
- Jurisdiction: Government of Kerala
- Headquarters: Sakthan Arcade, Thrissur city, Kerala
- Employees: 14
- Minister responsible: Oommen Chandy, Chief Minister.
- Agency executive: K Radhakrishnan, Chairman
- Parent agency: Government of Kerala

Thrissur Development Authority (TDA) was a statutory body overseeing the development of the City of Thrissur and Thrissur Metropolitan Area in the state of Kerala, India. K Radhakrishnan was the last chairman of Thrissur Development Authority.

== History ==
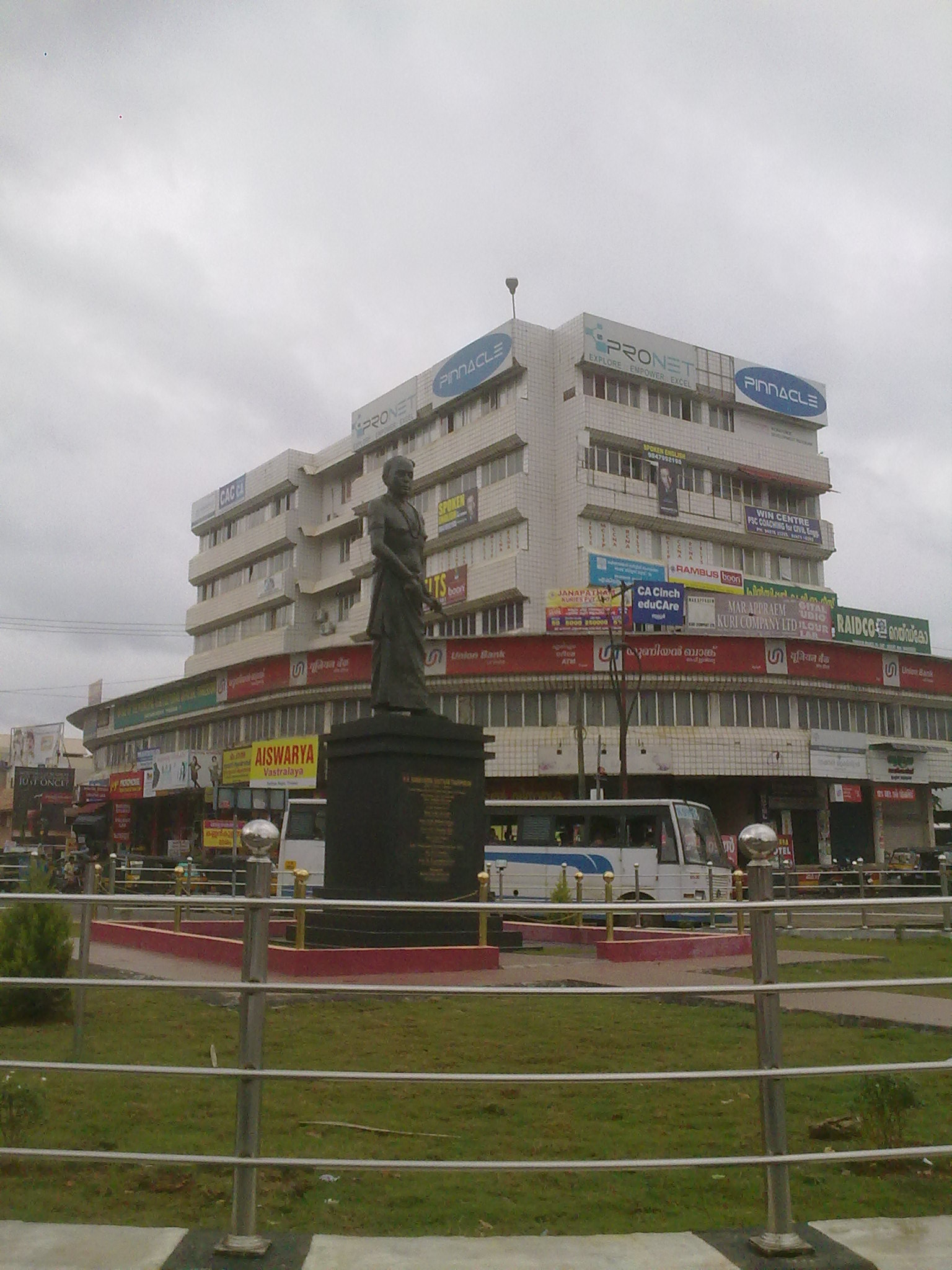
Headquarters of Thrissur Development Authority in Sakthan Thampuran Nagar in Thrissur city

In 1981 the Government of Kerala constituted the Thrissur Urban Development Authority (TUDA) under the Town Planning Act. It came into existence in June 1983. In 2007, the Government of Kerala dissolved the authority. Later in 2012, the authority was again reconstituted by the Government of Kerala. On 8 April 2013, the Government of Kerala had appointed K Radhakrishnan as Chairman of Development Authority and Renamed as Thrissur Development Authority (TDA). In 2016, the Kerala Government disbanded Thrissur Development Authority.
