= Thangassery Chinese Coins =

Chinese coins from middle ages found in India

The Thangassery Chinese coins are a significant collection of Chinese cash coins from the Middle Ages that were found near the coast of Thangassery, a historic port suburb of Kollam in Kerala, India. During dredging operations at Kollam Port in 2014, 44 copper-alloy Chinese coins were found, providing solid archaeological proof of long-distance maritime trade between China and the Malabar Coast. In addition to examples from the Tang (618–907 CE) and Southern Song (1127–1279 CE) periods, these coins depict a number of Chinese imperial dynasties, most notably the Northern Song (960–1127 CE).

== Discovery ==
In 2014, thousands of Chinese coins were excavated during dredging work conducted off the coast of Kollam. The Department of Archaeology at the University of Kerala examined a random sampling consisting of 44 coins. Of these coins, 43 were able to be read; however, one had corroded beyond identification. The Chinese cast these coins in the same method as they would have cast them in China; that is, these coins were made from a mould rather than cast using a die that strikes a flat piece of metal. Each coin was issued by a certain Chinese dynasty and emperor, as indicated by the legends appearing on each coin.

== Classification ==
The systematic analysis of the readable coins revealed three primary dynastic groupings based on the coins and the respective dates as follows:

=== The Tang Dynasty dated between 618-907 CE ===
There are five (5) identifiable coins produced during the Tang Dynasty, the oldest being between 759 and 762 CE (Qian Yuan Zhong Bao) implying that the trade connection between Kollam and China developed in the 8th century CE.

=== The Northern Song Dynasty dated between 960-1127 CE ===
There are 36 (thirty-six) identifiable coins produced during the Northern Song dynasty and is the largest grouping. The most notable emperors from this dynasty on these coins are:

- Shen Zong: 10 Grains (Coins)
- Ren Zong: 9 Grains (Coins)
- Tai Zong: 5 Grains (Coins)

On occasion, there are coins belonging to Hui Zong and Zhe Zong and Ying Zong. Therefore, it would indicate that the optimal Chinese commercial contact with Kollam occurred during the 11th to 12th century CE period.

=== The Southern Song Dynasty dated between 1127-1279 CE ===
The Southern Song Dynasty has two (2) coins. They were issued by Ning Zong and Gao Zong.
