= Kerala Public Service Commission =

Indian state government agency

Keralam Public Service Commission
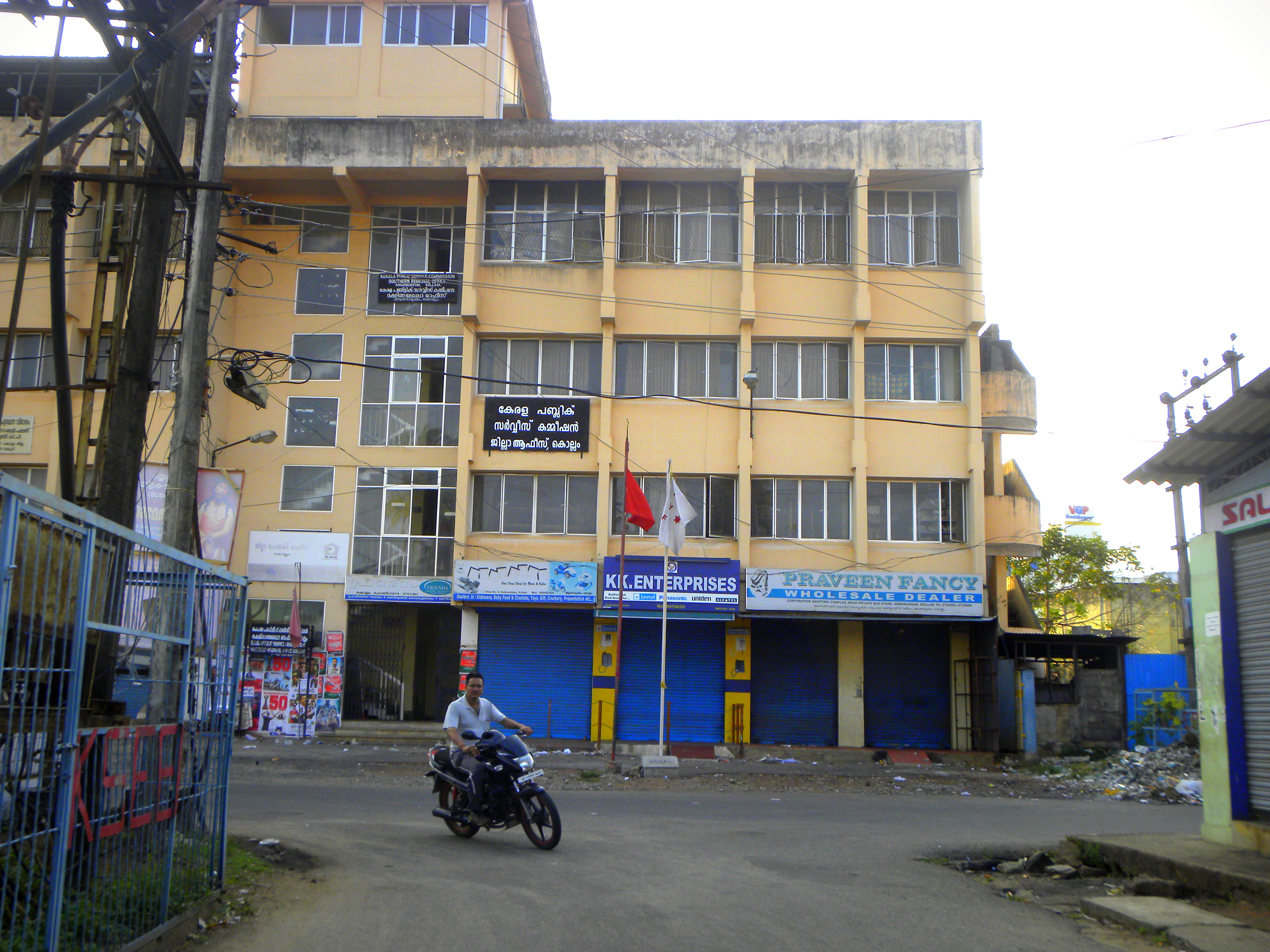
- Kerala PSC Kollam zonal and district offices, Andamukkam
- Type: Constitutional body
- Purpose: Recruitment
- Headquarters: Thulasi Hills, Pattom Palace P.O., Thiruvananthapuram 695004 Keralam
- Region served: Kerala
- Chairperson: M. R. Baiju
- Staff: 1600
- Website: keralapsc.gov.in

The Keralam Public Service Commission (KPSC) is a government body in the state of Keralam, India, responsible for recruiting candidates for various state government jobs through competitive examinations. It was established in 1956 under the provisions of the Constitution of India. The commission is headquartered at Pattom, Thiruvananthapuram, and has three regional offices and 14 district offices.

== History ==
In 1923, the Indian Government during British Raj established a Public Service Commission to examine the salary structure of the Indian Civil Service and the possibility of transferring some of the duties to provincial services. The commission was composed of five Englishmen and four Indians, with Viscount Lee of Fareham serving as chairman.

== List of former chairpersons ==
Former Chairmen
| SL. No. | Name | Took office | Left office |
|---|---|---|---|
| 1 | Kunhiraman C. | 1949 | 1950 |
| 2 | Ramavarma Thampuran | 1950 | 1956 |
| 3 | Velayudhan V. K. | 1956 | 1962 |
| 4 | Mariyarputham V. | 1963 | 1967 |
| 5 | Devassy M. K. | 1967 | 1972 |
| 6 | Kumaran M. K. | 1972 | 1975 |
| 7 | Sivankutty T. M. | 1975 | 1981 |
| 8 | Hemachandran M. K. | 1981 | 1984 |
| 9 | K. G. Adiyodi | 1984 | 1984 |
| 10 | Gopalakrishna Kurup | 1985 | 1991 |
| 11 | Chandrasekharan Nair R. | 1991 | 1995 |
| 12 | Gopalakrishna Pillai G. | 1996 | 2000 |
| 13 | Gangadhara Kurup M. | 2000 | 2006 |
| 14 | Salahuddin K. V. | 2006 | 2011 |
| 15 | Dr. K. S. Radhakrishnan | 2011 | 2016 |
| 16 | Adv. M. K. Sakeer | 2016 | 2022 |
| 17 | Dr. M. R. Baiju | 2022 | |

== Controversies ==
On 31 October 2026, the Kerala Crime Branch registered a fresh case after finding that 45 questions in the Assistant Motor Vehicle Inspector examination had been copied verbatim from online study material, on a complaint by Rahul Raj of Perumbavoor, Ernakulam, against unidentified commission officials.

== See also ==
- Union Public Service Commission
- Public sector undertakings in Kerala
- Unemployment in Kerala
- List of Public service commissions in India
