= Downtown Kollam =

Area of Kollam, India

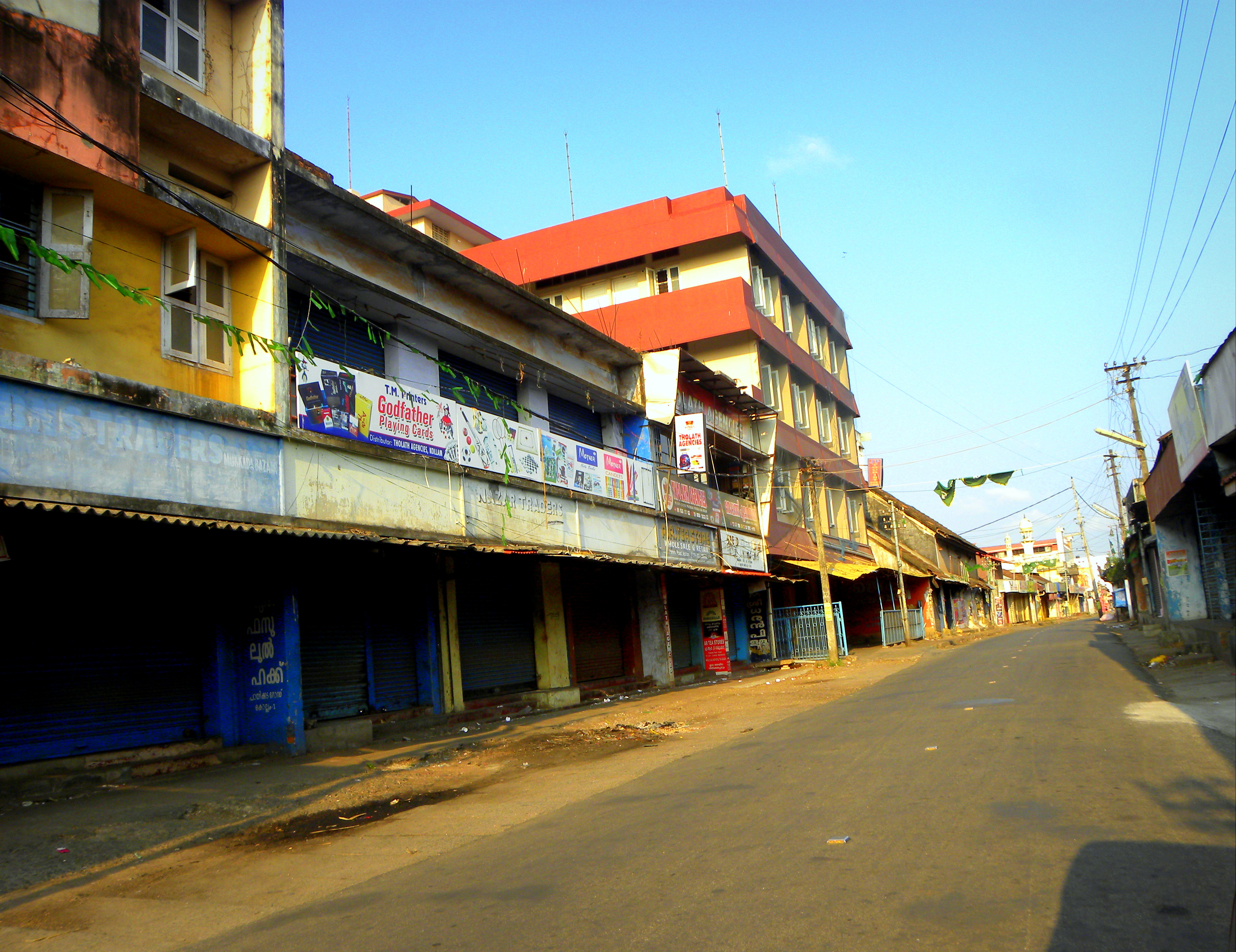
Paikkada road in downtown Kollam - Once this road was the nerve centre of the Malabar Coast's business capital 'Quilon'

Downtown Kollam is the primary central business district in the city of Kollam, Kerala, India. Located entirely within the former municipality of old Quilon, it is approximately bounded by Chinnakada to the east, Thangassery to the West, Cutchery to the north, and Mundakkal to the South. The area is popularly known for its business activities. Kollam was formerly an international emporium of trade and today remains a prosperous commercial centre.

The downtown area of Kollam has a long business history. Marco Polo, the Venetian traveller, who was in Chinese service under Kubla Khan in 1275, visited Kollam and other towns on the west coast, in his capacity as a Chinese mandarin. He pointed out that Old Kollam was the only town on the west coast of India with multi-story buildings, some of which still stand today. He found Christians and Jews living in Coilum (Kollam) as well as merchants from China and Arabia. Polo left a detailed account of Kollam in his writings, extracts of which are reproduced in the Travancore State Manual. Many clothing, vegetables, stationery, pharmaceuticals, and spice wholesale-retail dealers do business in the downtown area of this old industrial city and there are many hotels in the downtown area. The proximity to Kollam Port makes this area one of the biggest business centres in India. It also contains the buildings of the Kollam Municipal Corporation.

== Big Bazaar and Pharma City ==
Downtown Kollam is one of the largest central business districts in the state of Kerala. The area is known as a center of trading and culture. Kollam's main road runs through the center of the downtown business district of Old Quilon. The north–south area of this downtown, popularly known as Big bazaar, is the largest bazaar in city of Kollam with many rice, spice and cloth merchants doing business in the Big bazaar area.

The area behind Kollam District hospital is known as Pharma city because of its large number of pharmaceutical and surgical distributors.

== Neighborhoods ==
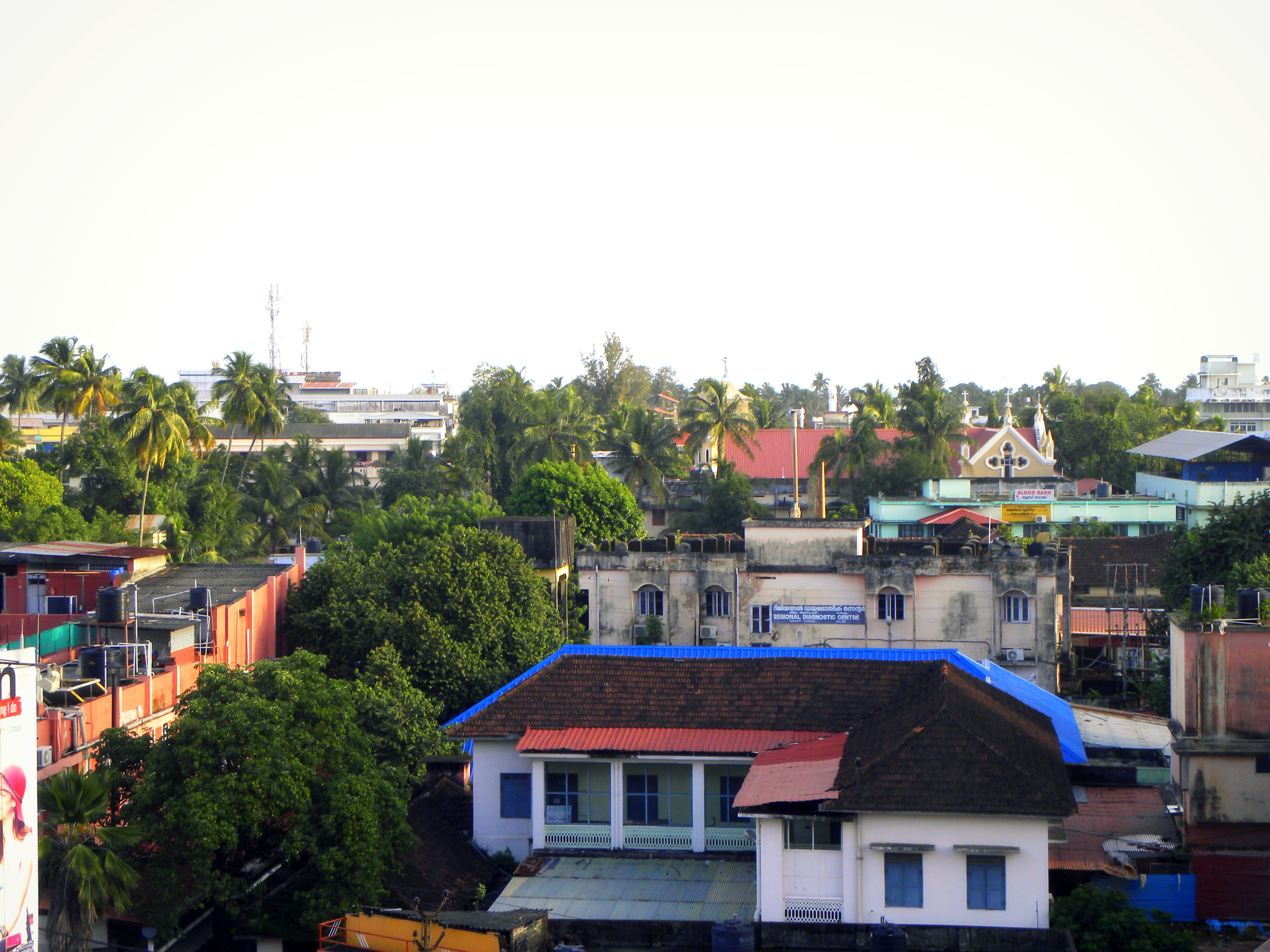
Aerial view of off-Chinnakada in downtown Kollam

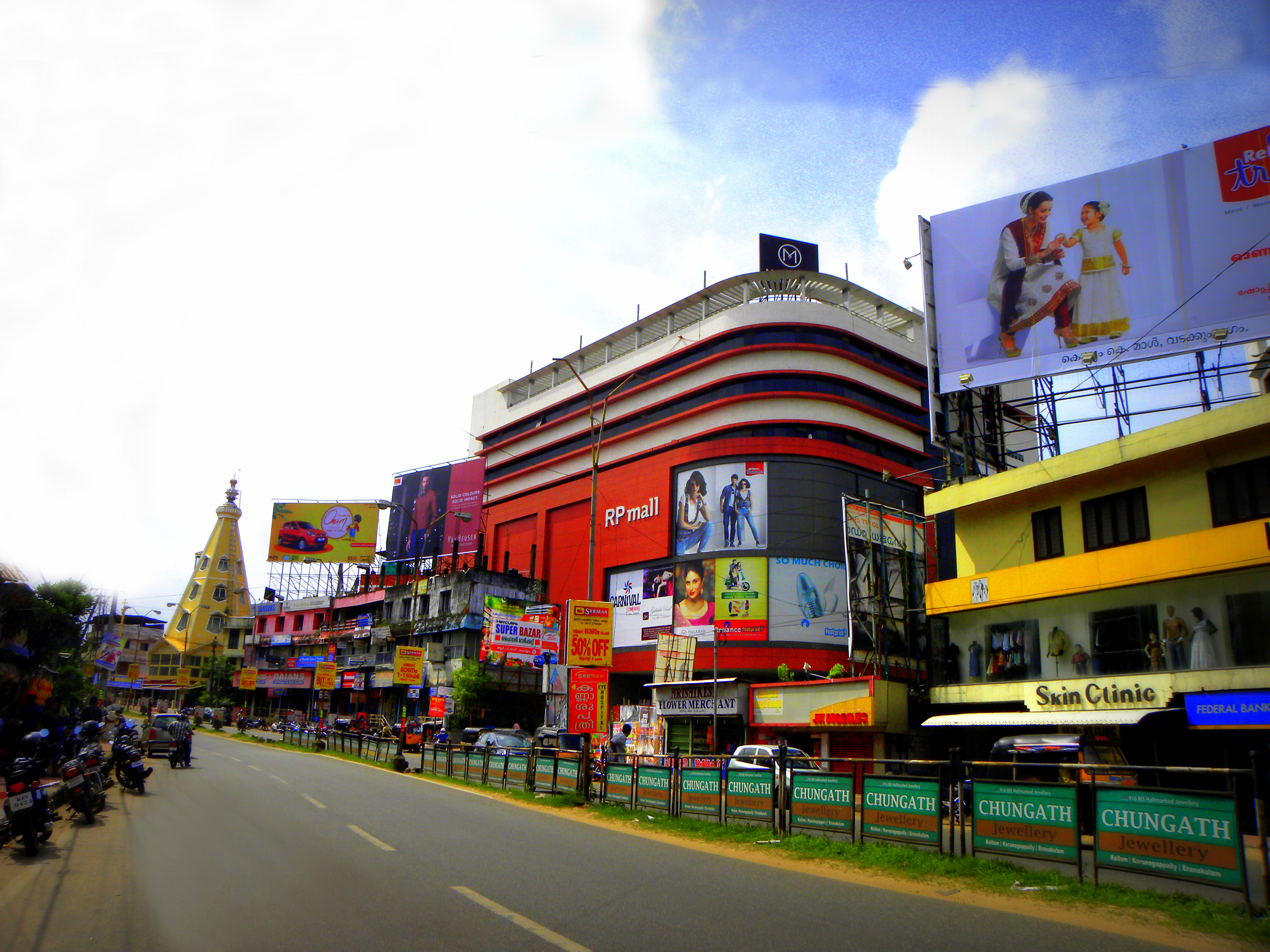
RP Mall - A view from downtown area, Kollam

An aerial view of Chinnakada in downtown Kollam during 2008

- Valiyakada
- Lakshminada
- Chamakada
- Chinnakada
- Pullikada
- Paikkada
- Kadappakada
- Kottamukku
- Kochupilamoodu
- Vadakkumbhagam
- Pallithottam
- Kollam Beach
- Vadayattukotta
- Thamarakulam
- Andamukkam
- Vaddy
- Kaval
- Thangassery
- Port Kollam
