= Chinnakada =

Chinnakada Chinnakkada
- CBD & Neighbourhood
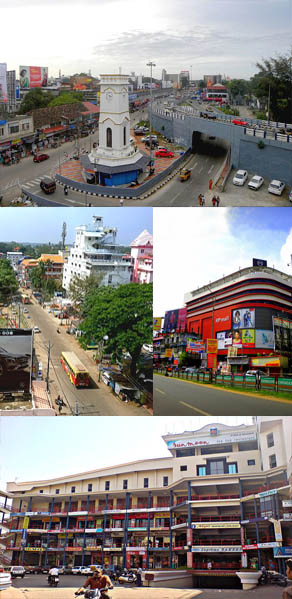
- From top clockwise: Clock Tower, RP Mall, Bishop Jerome Nagar, Residency Road

- Location in Kollam, India Chinnakada (Kerala)
- Coordinates: 8.887°N 76.591°E
- Country: India
- State: Kerala
- District: Kollam

Government
  - Body: Kollam Municipal Corporation(KMC)

Languages
  - Official: Malayalam, English
- Time zone: UTC+5:30 (IST)
- PIN: 691001
- Vehicle registration: KL-02
- Lok Sabha constituency: Kollam
- Civic agency: Kollam Municipal Corporation
- Avg. summer temperature: 34 °C (93 °F)
- Avg. winter temperature: 22 °C (72 °F)
- Website: http://www.kollam.nic.in

Chinnakada or Chinnakkada is considered as the heart of the city of Kollam in Kerala, India. Chinnakada is a busy junction where 5 city roads and one National highway interconnect at a traffic roundabout. The city's symbolic clock tower is located in Chinnakada. To reduce the traffic congestion in Chinnakada, Kollam Municipal Corporation constructed an underpass near to clock tower. Marine Products Export Development Authority (MPEDA)'s Kollam sub-regional office is situated at Chinnakada.

== Toponymy ==
The name Chinnakada may be derived from China-Kada, which means China bazaar. Chinese coins and other artefacts in enormous quantities were found near the Kollam port, proving Kollam was a significant Chinese trading hub. Another explanation is that due to the presence of a large number of Tamil people in Kollam, they named the area Chinnakada, which means "small market" in the Tamil language. This derivation fits with the toponomy of Valiakada adjacent to Chinnakada, which means "big market" in Malayalam.

Other areas in Kollam ending with the word kada in the name

- Kadappakada
- Payikkada
- Pullikada
- Chamakada
- Valiyakada

== History ==
The ancient city of Kollam, then known as Quilon, was an important center for trade with the Chinese.

The Chinese traders were one of the oldest foreign communities to settle in Kollam. That was during 8th century AD or even before. That was during the period Kollam evolved as a major trade centre ( of spices ) and an important port in the Malabar coast. Chinnakada could be the corrupted form of China-Kada, means China Bazaar ( or Chinese market). That argument should be taken with a pinch of salt, as Chinnakkada also means small market (in Tamil). That stands complementary to the Valiakada adjacent to Chinnakada, which means big market in Malayalam.

== Chinnakada Underpass ==
Aerial view of Chinnakada in 2008

The Chinnakada Underpass is a public road infrastructure project for the city of Kollam as part of the Kerala Sustainable Urban Development Project supported by the Asian Development Bank (ADB) to ease traffic congestion at Chinnakada, the city CBD of Kollam. The presence of an existing Railway over bridge and three close intersections with heavy traffic limits the option for traffic management measures including junction improvement. That caused the authorities to think about this underpass at Chinnakada. Chinnakada is a complex junction where roads from Thiruvananthapuram, Alappuzha, Downtown, Sengottai, Ashramam, Kollam Beach and the City bus stand road meets.

Preliminary design for underpass was prepared by NATPAC (NATPAC - National Transportation Planning and Research Centre) involving the acquisition of 0.08 hectares (0.20 acres) of government land on a temporary basis. Height of the road passage above the underpass was increased to 5.5 metres (18 ft) from 5 metres (16 ft) to facilitate movement of modern container trucks through the underpass. Underpass has been thrown open to the public by the end of May 2015.

== Gallery ==
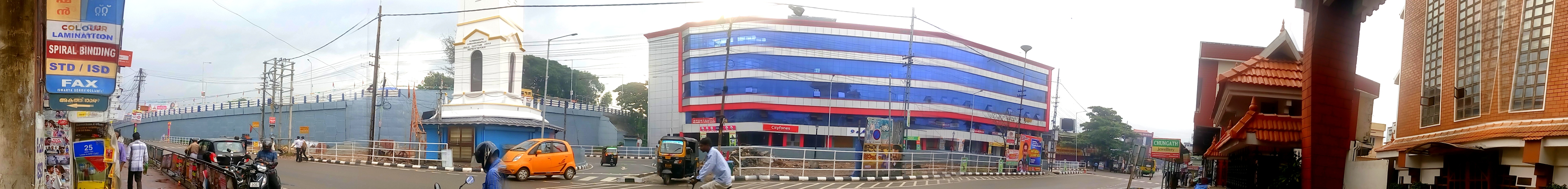
Panorama of Chinnakada, the CBD of Kollam (Quilon) city in India in September 2015
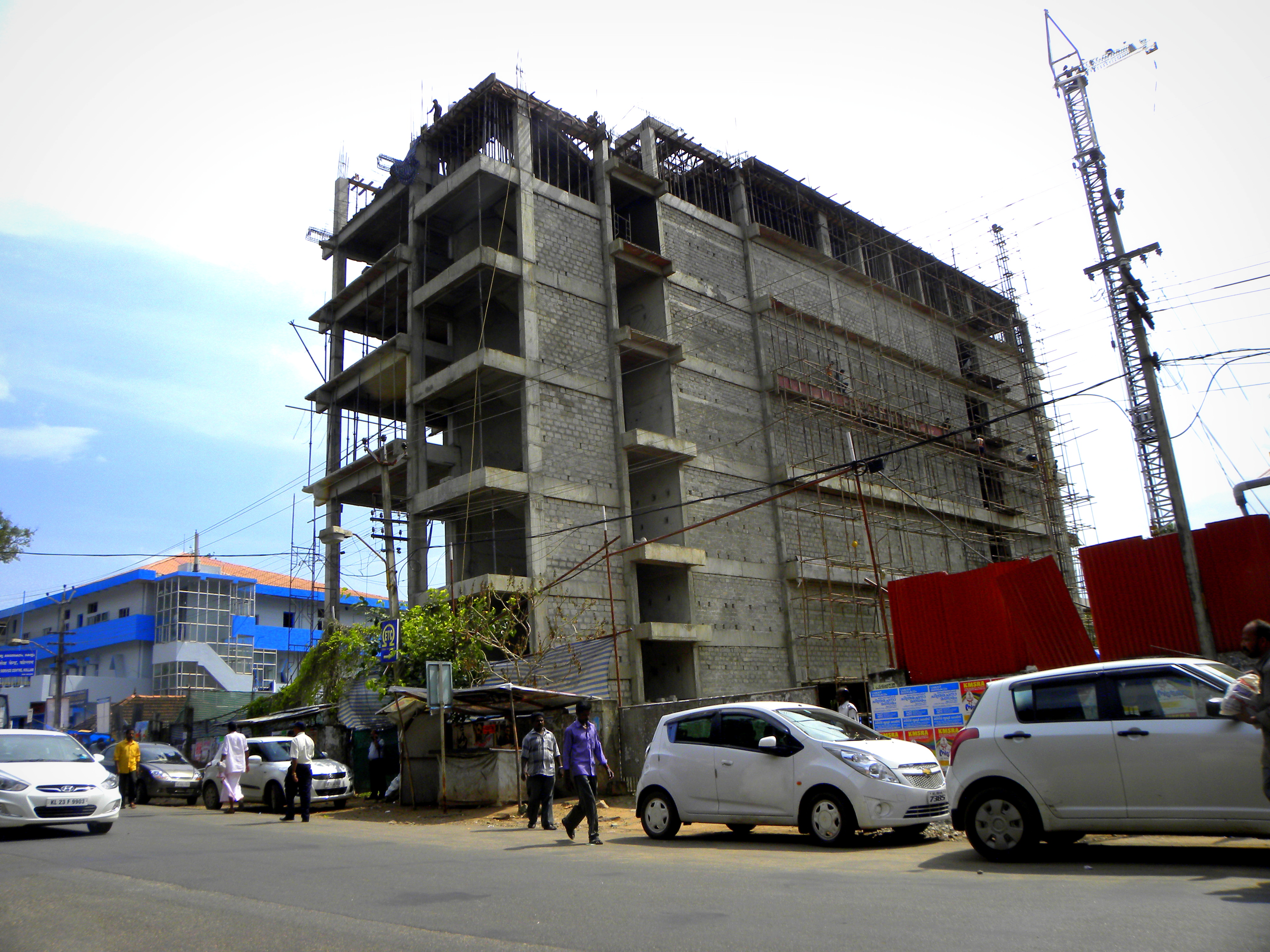
Upcoming Pulimootil Silks building at Chinnakada, Kollam

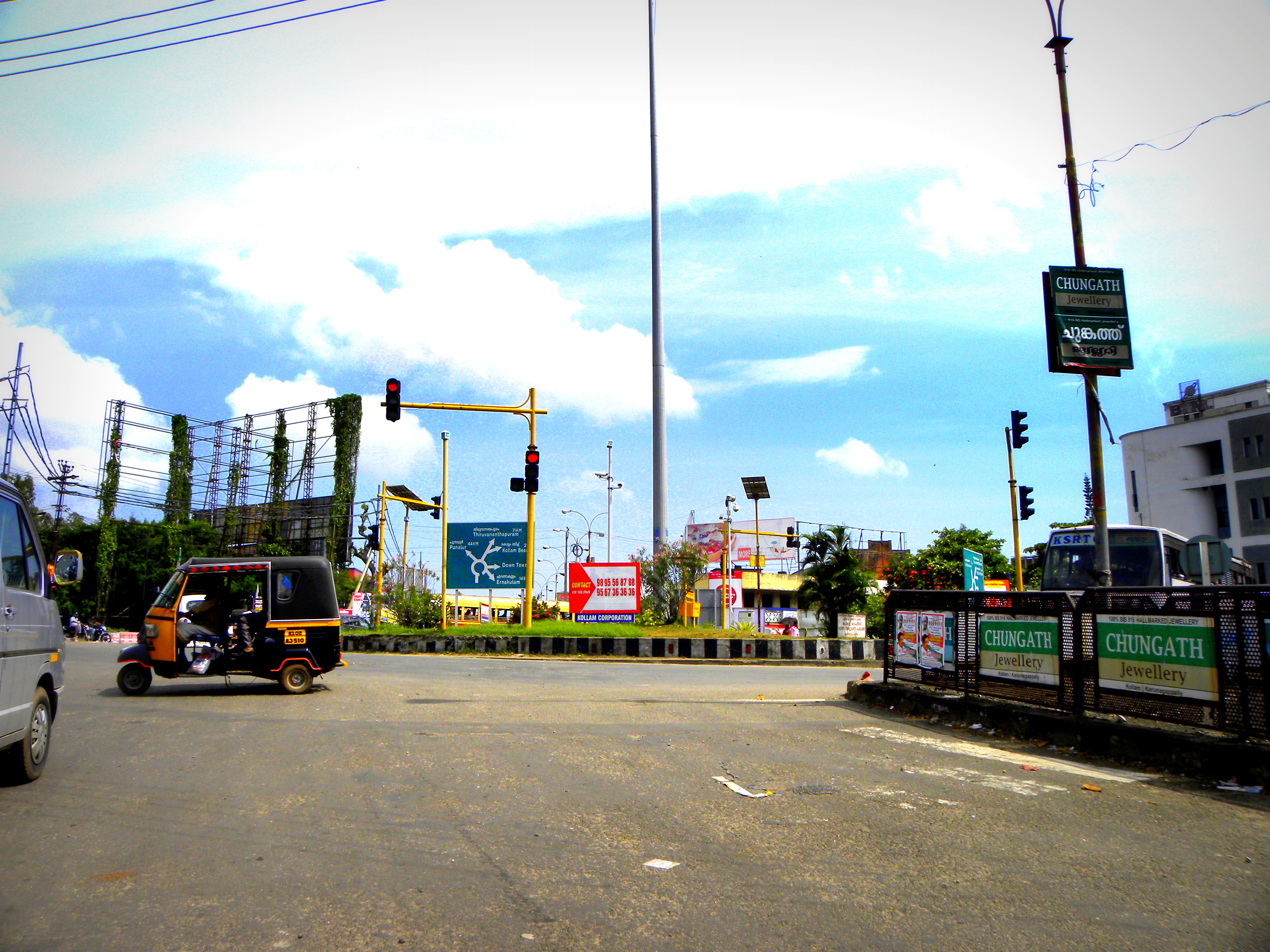
Chinnakada Roundabout, Kollam

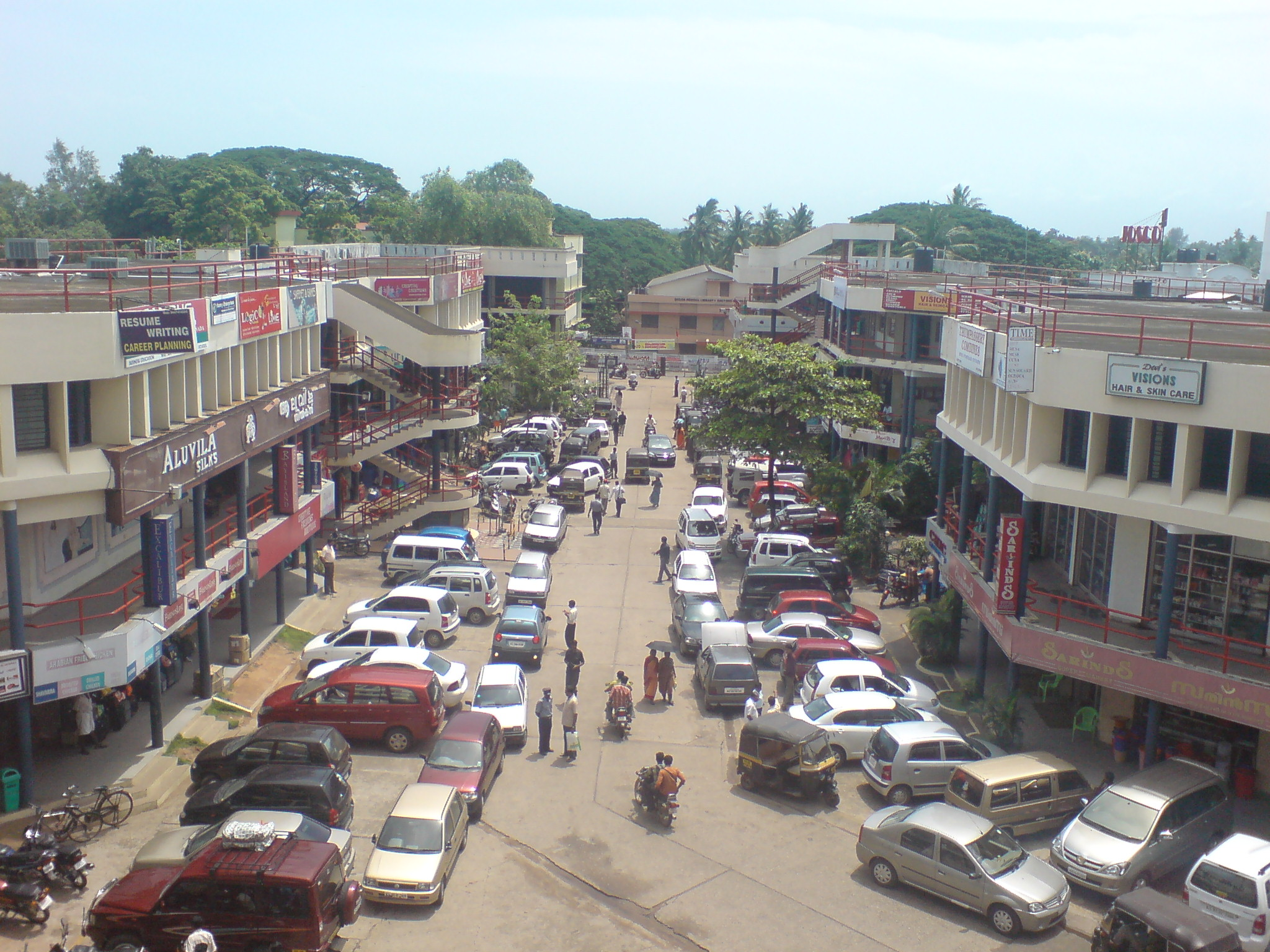
Bishop Jerome Nagar: One of the popular shopping destinations in Kollam city

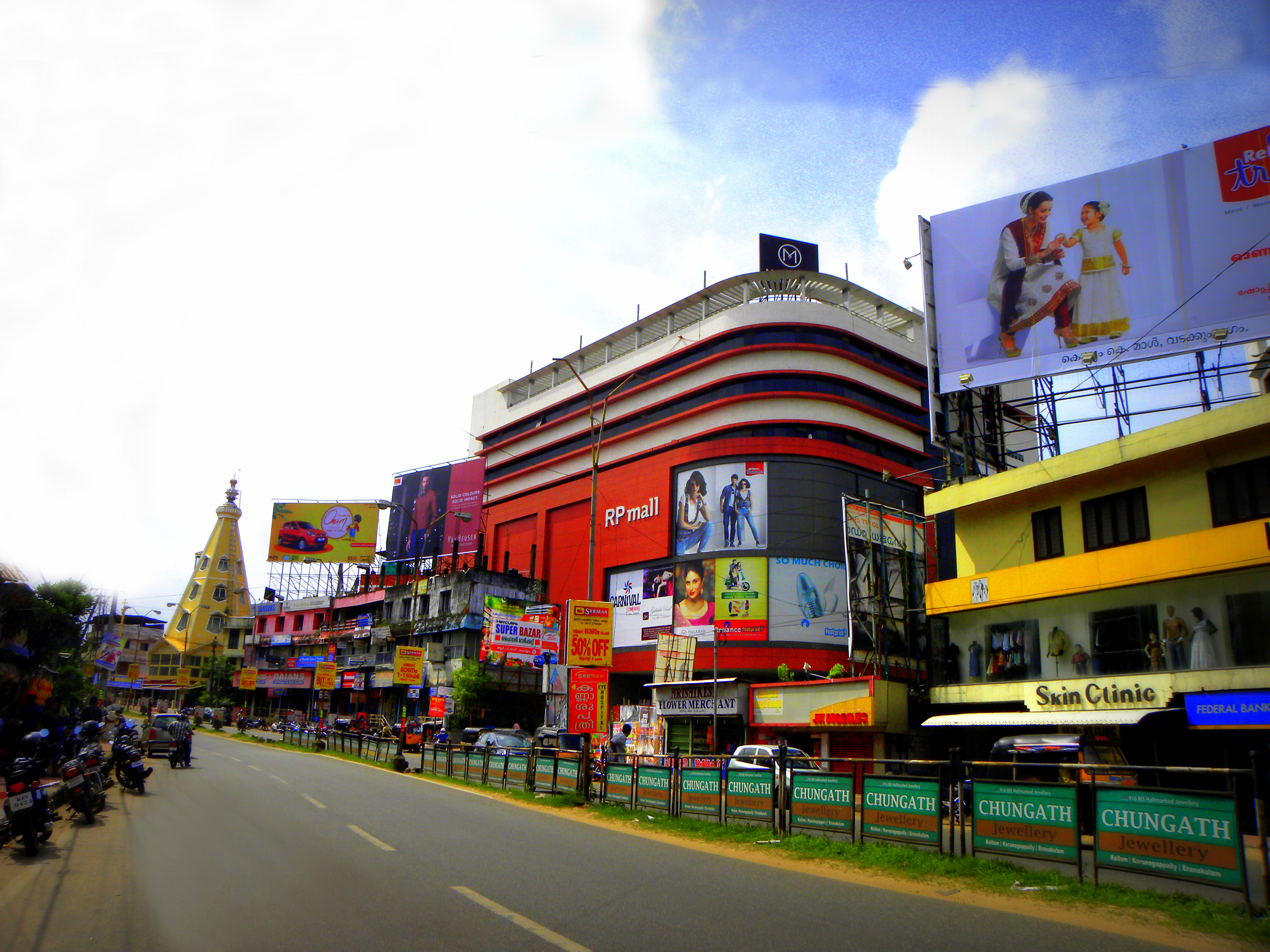
RP Mall, off Chinnakada

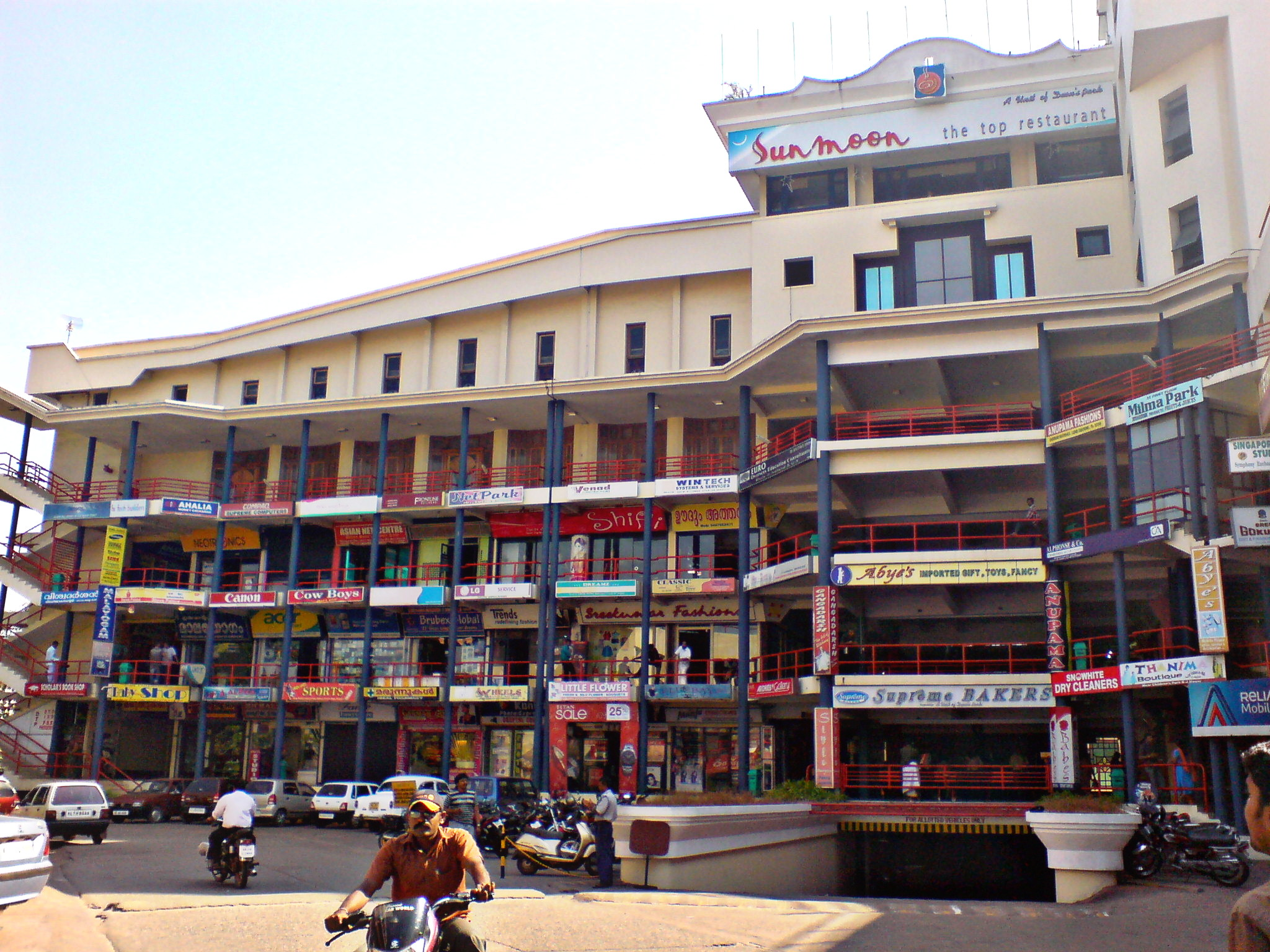
Front view of Bishop Jerome Nagar

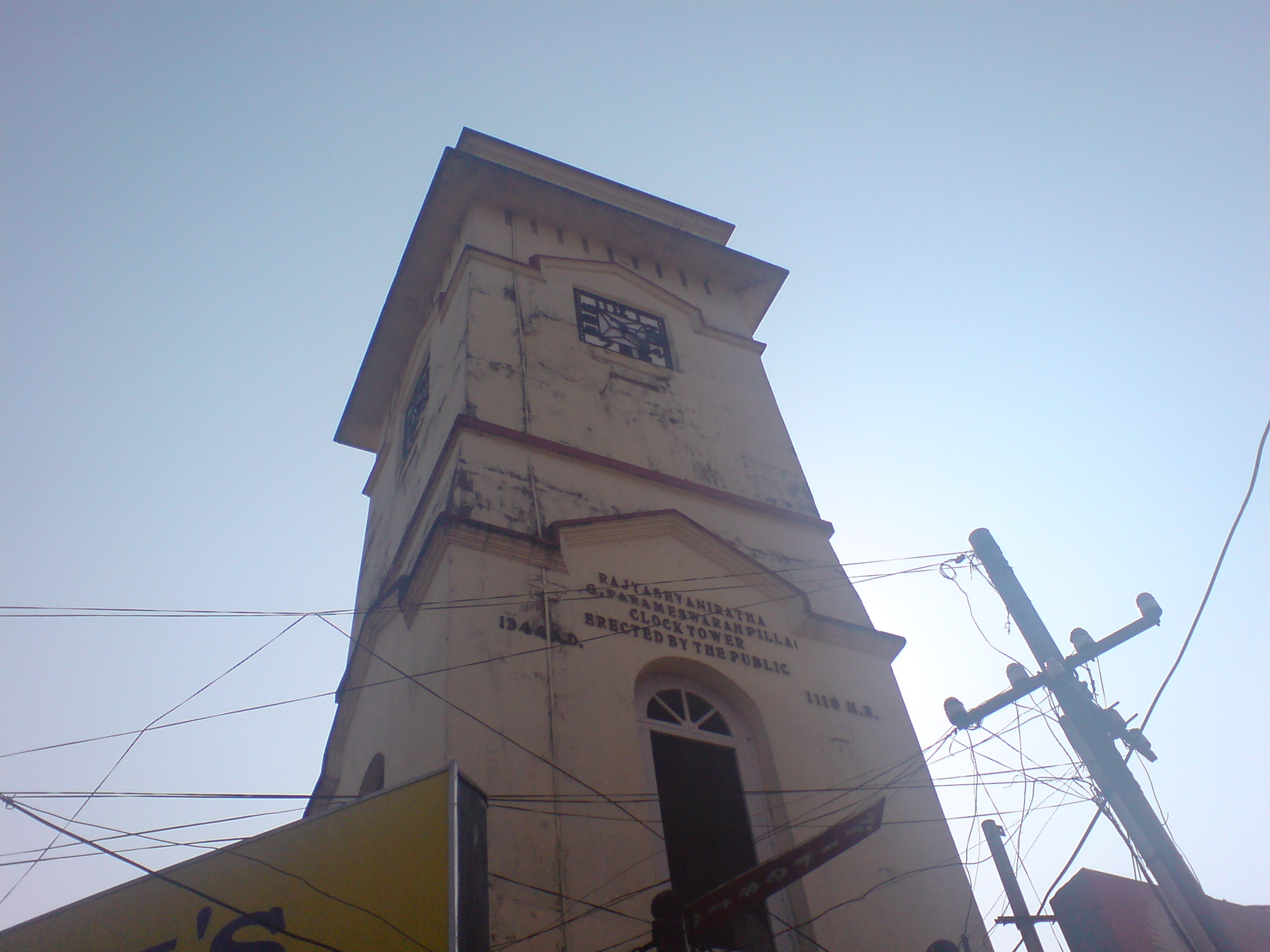
Clock tower in Chinnakada

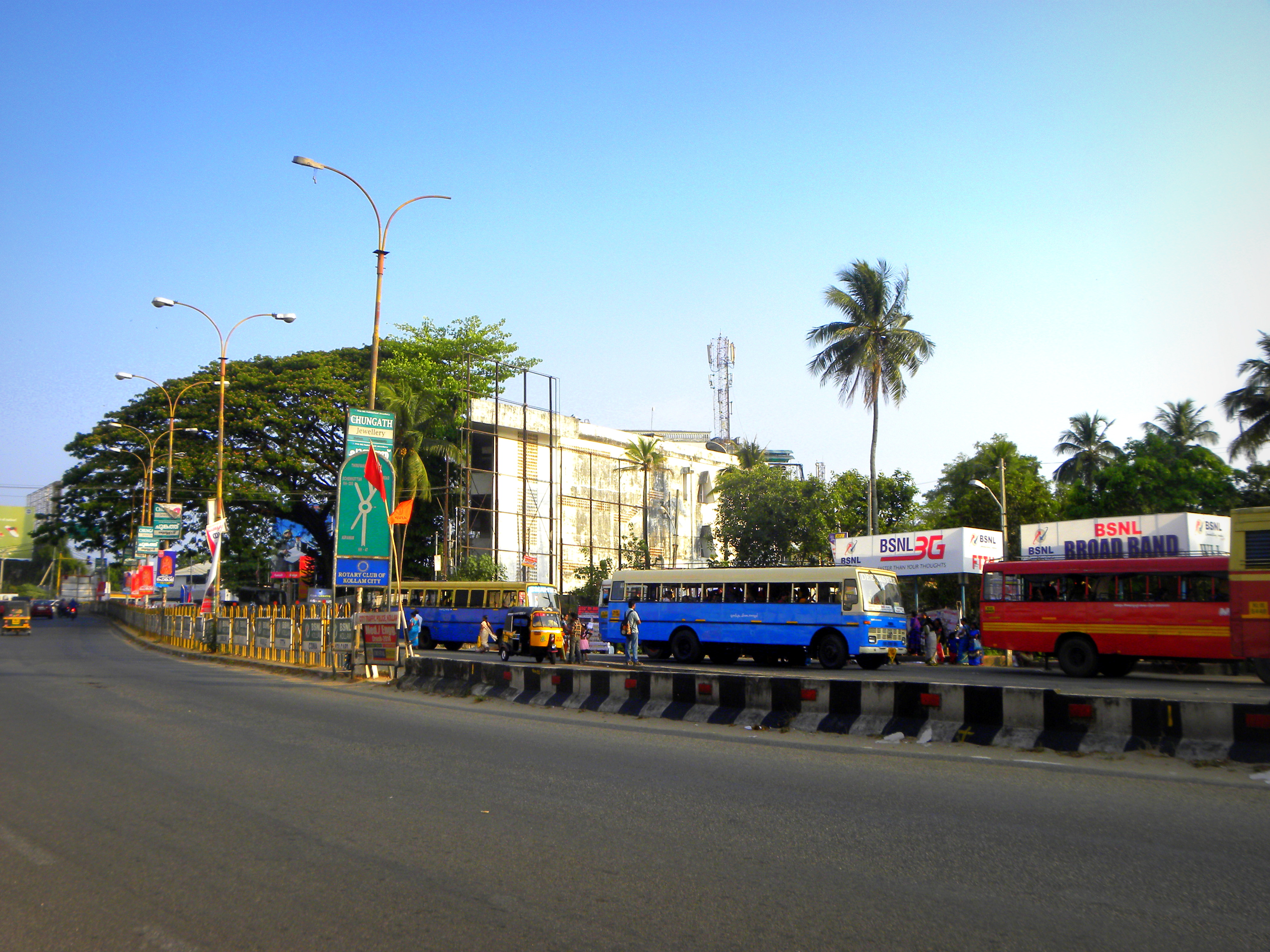
Chinnakada bus stop

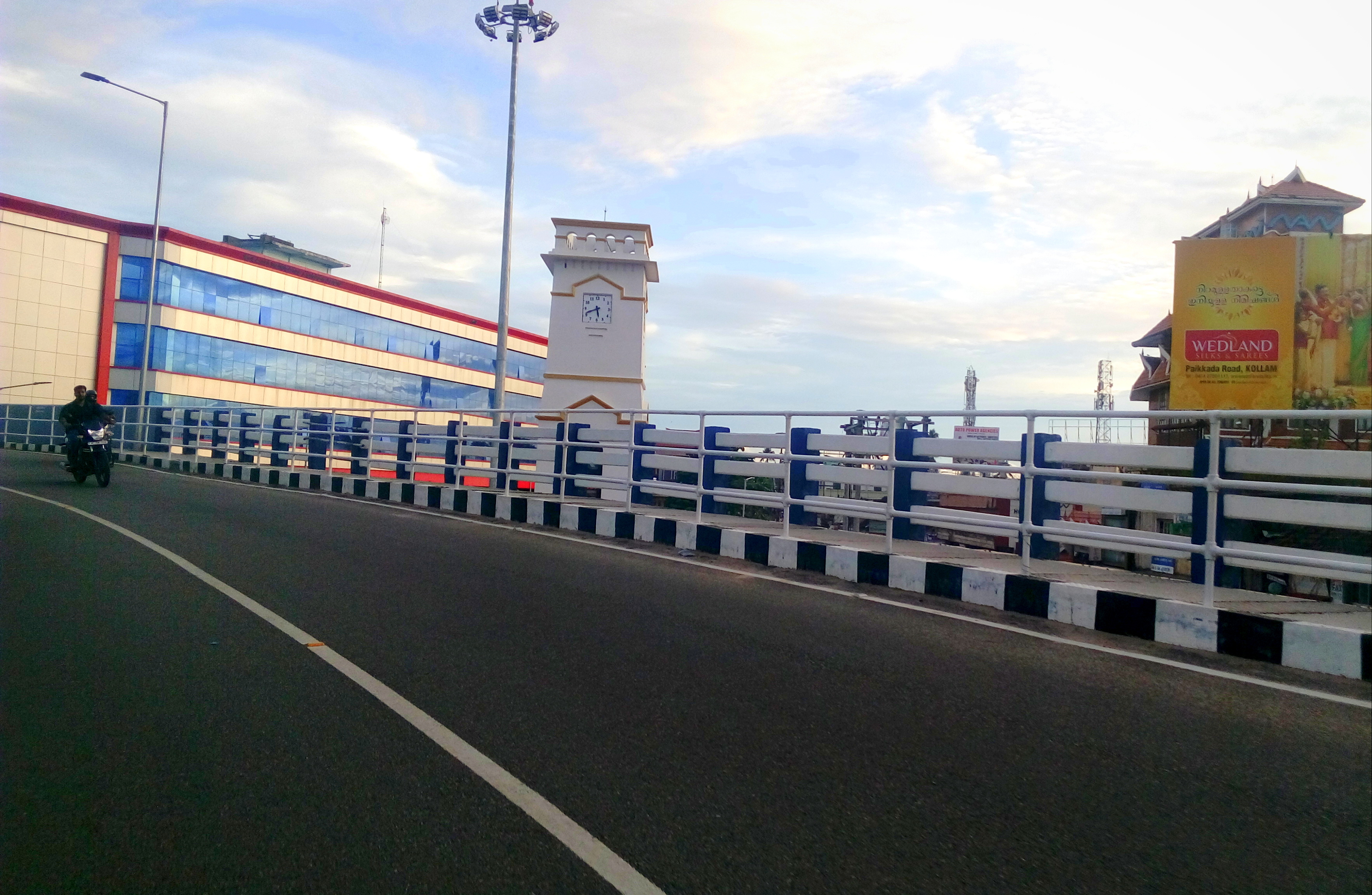
Renovated Chinnakada flyover and Clocktower

== See also ==
- Kollam
- Kollam Junction railway station
- Kollam district
- Kollam Port
- Kollam Beach
- Kollam Pooram
- Andamukkam City Bus Stand
- Kadappakada
- Asramam Maidan
