= Cashew business in Kollam =

Aspect of agriculture in the Indian city

The Cashew business in Kollam is based in the eponymous city, which is known as the Cashew Capital of the World. Kollam is the largest processed cashew exporter in the world. As of 2011 there were more than 600 cashew processing units in the city. About 800,000 tonnes of raw cashews are imported to the city for processing every year. 80% of India's export quality cashew kernels were prepared in Kollam. Kollam has remained the cashew capital of the world since the 1930s.

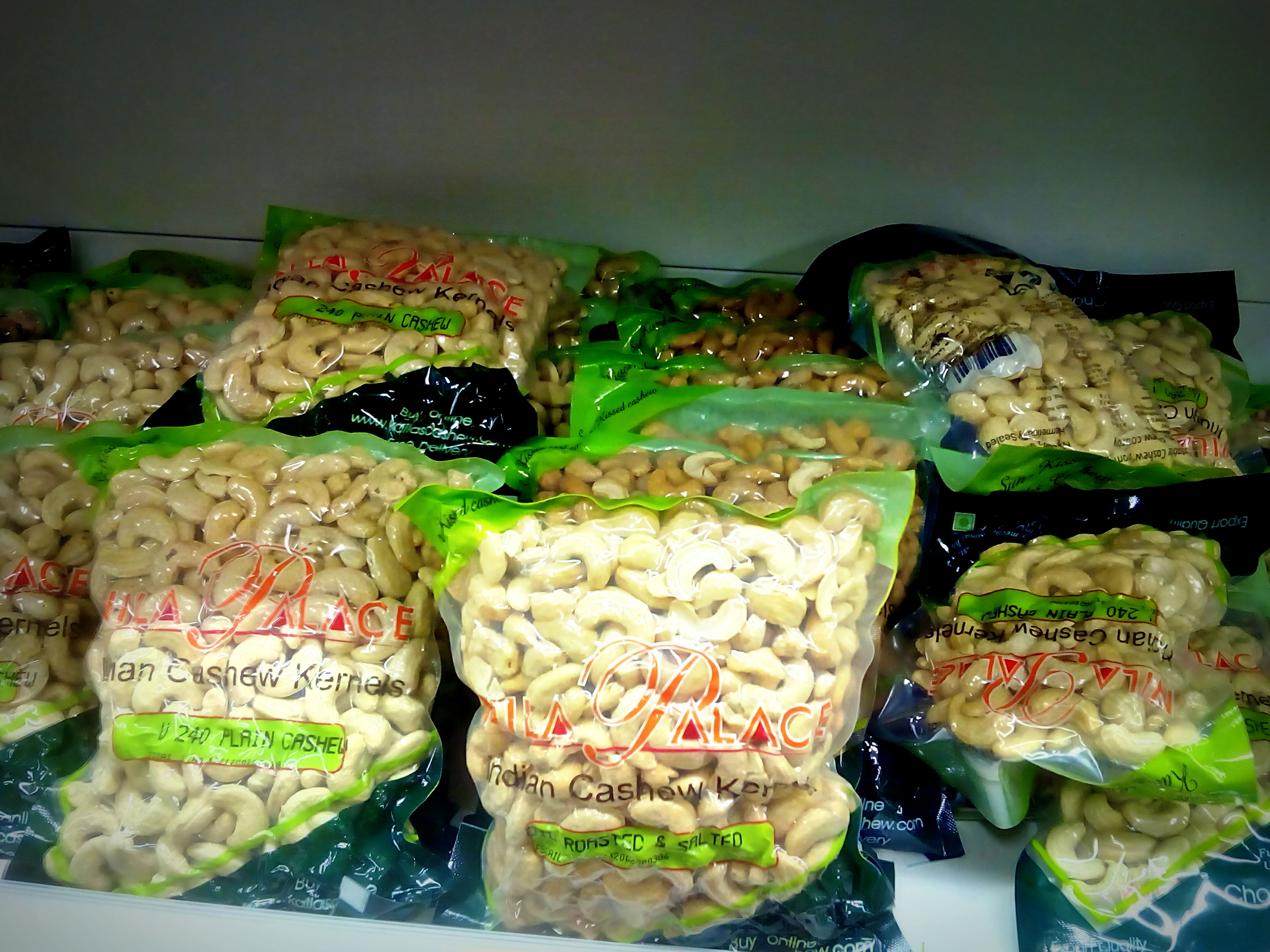
Nila Cashew packets displayed in a Supermarket at Paravur near Kollam

However high cost of production existing in Kollam due to limited mechanisation and higher minimum wages, stiff competition on the cost front from East Africa and Southeast Asia from an international perspective and Tamil Nadu and East India in domestic perspective are putting a lot of pressure over cashew processing sector of Kollam in recent times.

== History ==
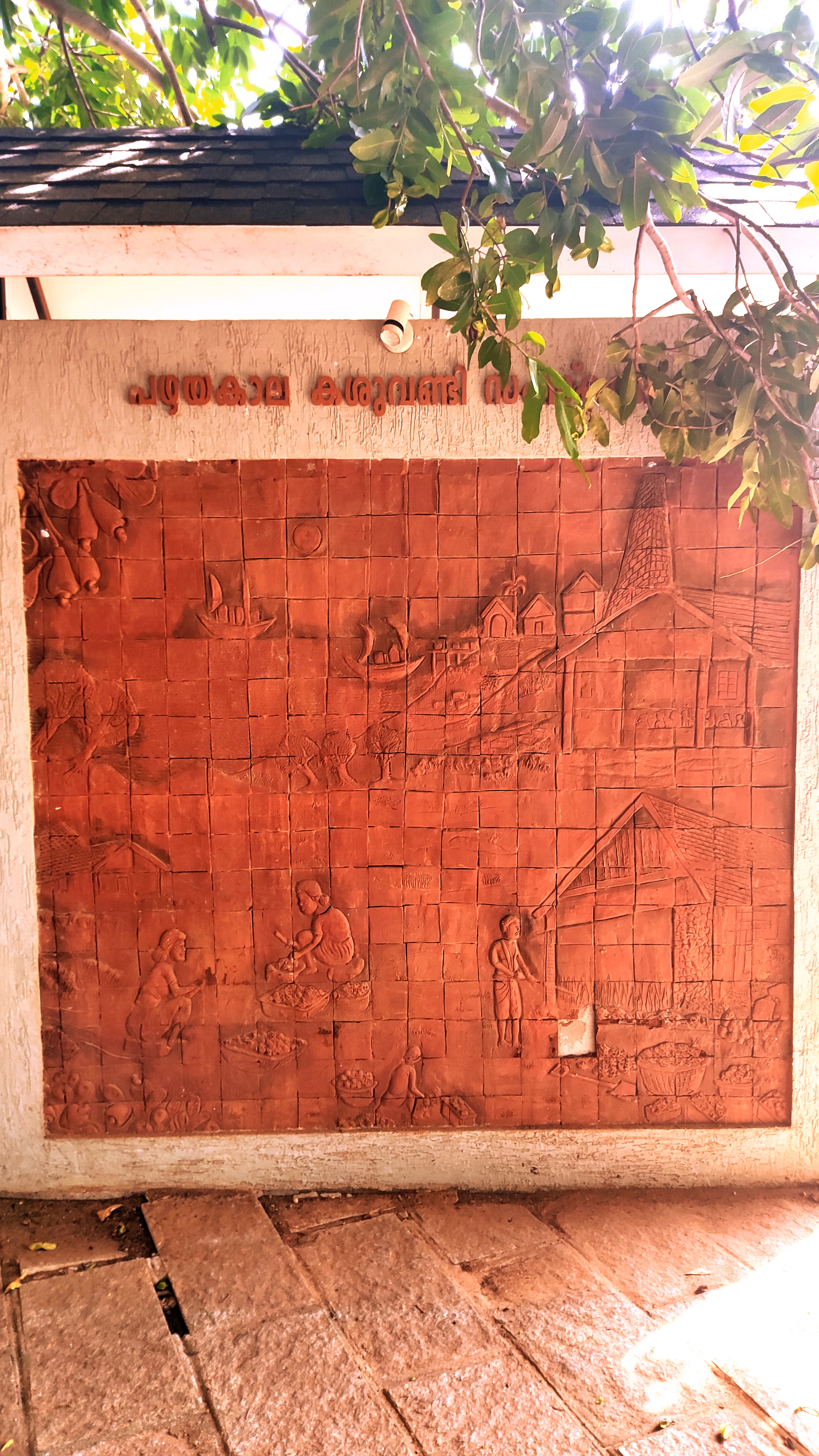
Cashew processing in Old Ages, Relief in Ashramam, Kollam

Cashews were first brought to India by the Portuguese from the native Tupi territory (a Neotropic Divergent Evolutive Zone) in North Eastern Brazil. Portuguese planted them along the coasts of Goa to prevent erosion. Cashew came to Kerala in 1505, when Kolathiri king permitted Portuguese to build a fort in Kannur. The Portuguese, called Paranki in Malayalam planted cashew trees around the fort. Hence cashew trees are also called Parankimaavu in Malayalam and cashew nuts are called Parankiyandi. By the late 16th century Cashew trees started to spread across Kannur and also to other parts of Kerala with laterite soil such as Kollam with considerable Portuguese influence and Kasaragode. During the time of the Portuguese, Dutch and British in the Indian subcontinent, Quilon and its old port were major business hubs for Arabian and Chinese traders. The trees that were brought from Brazil adapted very well to their new home. In the course of time, India became the main centre of cashew cultivation along with other nations in Asia and Africa.

By 18th century the Cashew nuts getting mixed with sand and roasted in open pots (Chattis) became common. The processing in commercial basis of cashew started in Mangalore. In Kanara and Malabar region the business was monopolised by Messers Pierce Leslie and Co. Ltd.

But by 1920s the business was started in Kollam in Kerala State which later became the centre of the trade. As per available written records, in early days the Cashew industry in Kollam was overwhelmingly Cottage Industry. The development of industry in Kollam as industrial units were pioneered by Roch Victoria an Anglo-Indian who migrated from then Ceylon with the assistance of a Swaminathan from Madras State. Modern roasting methods were introduced later in 1925 by an enterprising industrialist named Joseph Periera who started first cashew-nut factory in Kollam. In 1920 itself Kollam entered into world cashew exports market with export of kernels mainly to United States. As per available records it was W.T. Anderson who set up a business under the name Indian Nut Company in Kollam who made the first exports. Indian Nut Company's factory was situated near Ashramam airstrip and the goods were transported using waterways to export through Kochi Port.

In early days of exports the cashew nuts that were fried in pans and kernels extracted, processed and sorted (blanched, graded) and packed in wooden tea chests lined with newspaper before shipping it. This packing reduced shelf life of cashew and hence soon wooden containers were replaced with metal tin containers. This tin cans were vacuumed using hand operated vacuum pumps and were sealed. In 1954 this method was replaced by storing the kernels in cans infused with carbon dioxide primarily to avoid weevil infestation. This method, known as "Vita Packing", is still in use. The health benefits and value of cashew nut were discovered much later. This increased fortunes of cashew in global markets.

By late 1930s the volume of processed cashew, processing capacity and international demand rose manifolds. This necessitated the imports of raw cashew from East Africa to Kollam. To smoothen the import process and ensure price stability of imports the industry leaders formed a 'Cashew Syndicate' and by 1955 this entity was replaced with an institution that had requisite legal framework i.e. the Cashew Export Promotion Council (CEPC) by Government of India. At this time Kollam wielded a monopoly over cashew processing in India. As per Centre for Development Studies a report on an Enquiry into Conditions of Labour in the Cashew-nut processing Industry in India made in 1954 highlights that 75% of cashew factory workers and 72% of cashew factories in India were concentrated at Kollam. During this period the cashew factories had lesser regulations and the workers had to spend long working hours at lesser wages.

In 1960s there were a series of labour law reforms in cashewsector which resulted in shifting of industries to nearby states with lesser regulations. This outward shift reduced Kerala's share in cashew production significantly. However within he state Kollam continued to enjoy its dominance.

Even today many of the cashew businesses in Kollam are family owned and run. The legendary businessmen from Kollam like Thangal Kunju Musaliar were associated with the cashew industry. Nila Cashews, MARK, CDC etc. are some prominent business players currently.

== Cashew exports ==
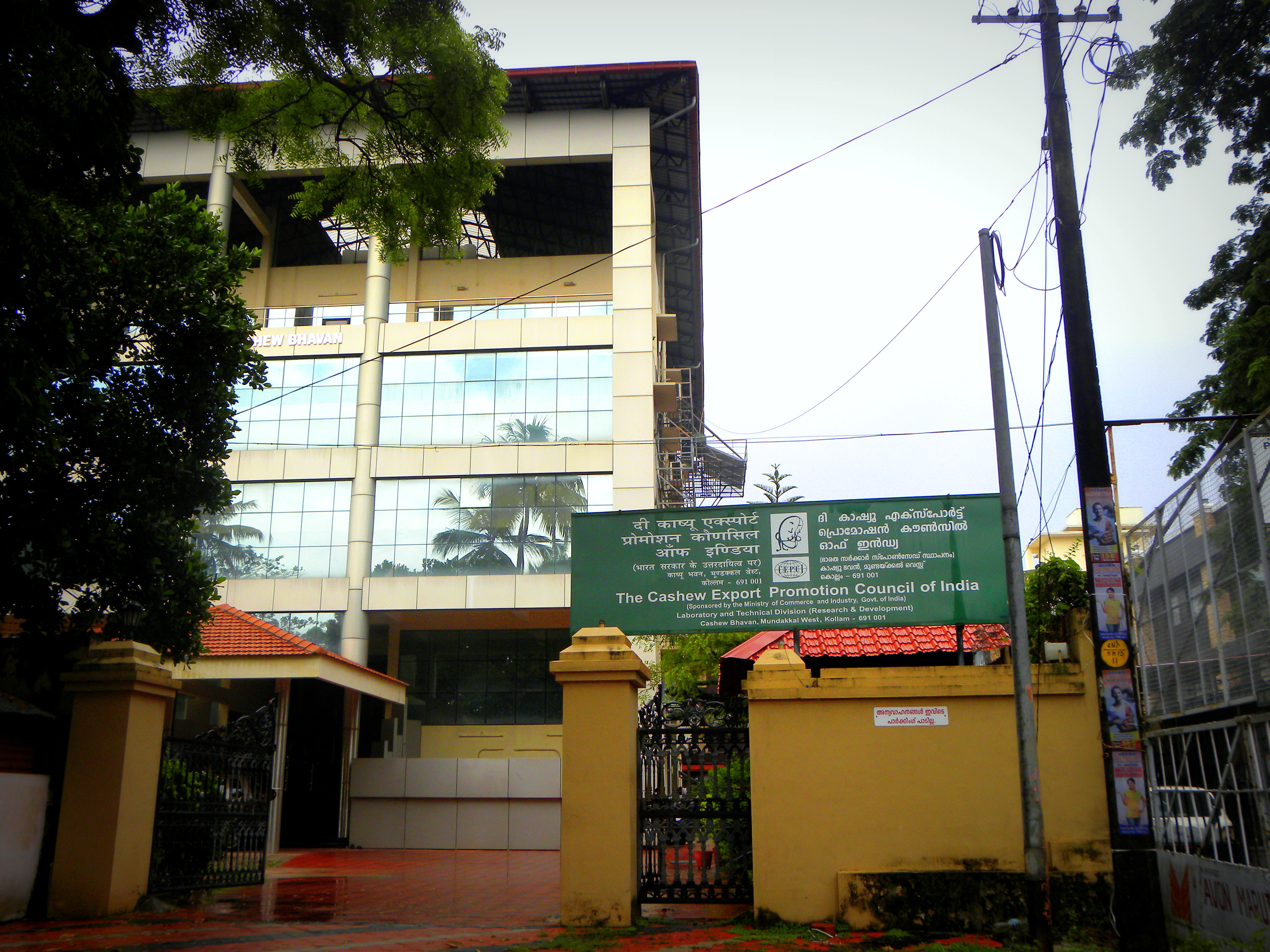
CEPCI Headquarters in Kollam

India is the largest exporter of cashew kernels and cashew nut shell liquid (CNSL). Foreign exchange earned by the country through the export of cashew kernels during 2011-12 reached Rs.4,390 crore based on statistics from the Cashew Export Promotion Council of India (CEPCI). 131,000 tonnes of kernels were exported during 2011–12. 90% of these export quality cashew kernels are prepared in Kollam. CEPCI and the Kerala State Cashew Development Corporation Limited work in Kollam city to promote exports of cashew kernels and cashew nut shell liquid from India. They also protect the interest of workers and attempt to provide maximum employment to the industry's workers and give them statutory benefits such as minimum wages and bonuses.

The industry provides a livelihood for about 600–700 thousand employees and farmers. In Kollam district alone there are more than 250,000 employees directly involved in the industry, which is about 10 per cent of the population of the district. 95 per cent of these workers are women. There are more than 600 cashew processing units in Kollam with about 800,000 tonnes of raw cashews imported annually to the city for processing. An average of 130,000 tonnes of processed cashews are exported to various countries worldwide every year. As a result, Kollam is known as the "Cashew Capital of the World". CEPCI is expecting a rise in exports to 275,000 tonnes by 2020, growth of 120 per cent over present exports.

Packing materials industrial supplies for the purpose of exports of cashews are fulfilled by different agencies like Golina agencies.

== Largest importers of cashew kernels from Kollam ==
Country	Exported Quantity	Value	Year
USA	47,611 tonnes	Rs.1,470.47 Crore	2011–12
UAE	14,173 tonnes	Rs.606.11 Crore	2011–12
Netherlands	11,517 tonnes	Rs.365.57 Crore	2011–12
Japan	--	Rs.237.45 Crore	2011–12
Saudi Arabia	--	Rs.207.01 Crore	2011–12

== CEPCI registered cashew exporters ==
CEPCI registered cashew exporters
Place in Kollam	Number of Companies
Kilikollur	25
Thattamala	2
Kadappakada	2
Chandanathoppe	13
Mylom	1
Parameswar Nagar	5
Asramam	2
Channapetta	1
Nallila	4
Kochupilamoodu	9
Kunnicode	1
Pavithreswaram	1
Valakam	1
Odanavattam	2
Mukkoodu	1
Ezhukone	4
Beach Road	6
Punalur	9
Edavattom	2
Kottamkara	1
Kannanalloor	1
Kundara	3
Vadakkevila	2
Kottarakkara	2
Peroor	6
Decent Junction	3
Puthoor	11
Mangad	7
Ayathil	1
Mundakkal West	2
Mundakkal	2
Perinad	1
Pathanapuram	9
Mavadi	2
Thamarakkulam	1
Kuttichira	1
Cantonment	1
Cantonment South	1
Lakshminada	1
Maranadu	1
Downtown	5
