= List of cashew companies based in Kollam =

Kollam or Quilon is known as the Cashew Capital of the World. Kollam is the largest processed cashew exporter in the world. As of 2011, there are more than 600 cashew processing units in the city. About 800,000 tonnes (790,000 long tons; 880,000 short tons) of raw cashews are imported to the city for processing every year. 90% of India's export quality cashew kernels are prepared in Kollam. Alfah Cashews is one among the popular Kollam based cashew exporters. Foreign exchange earnings of the nation through the export of cashew kernels in 2011–12 is Rs.4,390 crore, Rs.4046.23 crore in 2012–2013 and Rs.5058.73 crore in 2013–2014, based on the statistics from the Cashew Export Promotion Council of India (CEPCI). 131,000 tonnes (129,000 long tons; 144,000 short tons) of kernels were exported during 2011–12. 90% of these export quality cashew kernels are prepared in Kollam. and the Kerala State Cashew Development Corporation Limited work in Kollam city to promote exports of cashew kernels and cashew nut shell liquid from India. They also protect the interest of workers and attempt to provide maximum employment to the industry's workers and give them statutory benefits such as minimum wages and bonuses.

== Kollam based cashew exporting/processing companies ==
- A.A Nutts, Kilikollur
- A.A Snacks, Kilikollur
- Abbas Cashew Company, Kallumthazham
- Abhishek cashews industries, Kottarakkara
- Afeef Cashew Company, Thattamala
- AFFCO EXIM PVT Ltd, Kallumthazham
- A.J Industries, Mangad
- AKM Cashews, Kottamkara
- Al-Aziz and Company, Kilikollur
- Aleph Enterprises, Kadappakada
- Alin Cashews, Mangad
- Aliya Cashew Exporters, Chathinamkulam
- Alpha International, Kallumthazham
- Alphonsa Cashew Industries, Puthoor
- AMK Exports, Alumoodu
- Angel Cashews, Kottarakkara
- Anu Cashews, Parameswar Nagar
- Anzar Cashew Co., Chandanathope
- Apex Ventures Private Limited, Asramam
- A.S Cashew Exporters, Kilikollur
- Ashkar Cashew Industries, Kilikollur
- Associated Cashew Industries, Chandanathope
- Assorted Food Packers Pvt.Ltd., Mundakkal West
- Aysha Cashew Export, Kallumthazham
- Aziya International, Kilikollur
- Beena Cashew Company, Thevalapuram
- Beffy Cashew Company, Channapetta
- Bethanya Cashew Company, Puthoor
- Bethel Cashew Company, Nallila
- Bethsaida Cashew Company, Puthoor
- Binod Cashew Corporation, Kochupilamoodu
- Bismi Cashew Company, Kilikollur
- Bright Star Global Trading Corporation, Asramam
- BRj Enterprises, Jhansi
- Capital cashew exports,(mangadu)
- Carmel Cashews, Kunnicode
- Chaitanya Cashew Company, Mundakkal West
- Chemmarathil Cashew Company, Kottarakkara
- Chenkulathu Cashew Factory, Valakom
- Chethana Cashew Corporation, Kochupilamoodu
- Choice Cashew Industries, Chandanathope
- Chothy Enterprises, Kilikollur
- Crowne Enterprises,Vettikkavala
- Dev's Exports, Mundakkal
- Ebenezer Cashew Company, Kottarakkara
- Emmanuel Cashew Industries, Odanavattam
- Ecobha, Kadappakada
- Eshika Cashew Company, Beach Road
- Excellent Cashew Co, Kilikollur
- Fathima Cashew Company, Chandanathope
- Five Star Cashew Exporters and Importers, Chandanathope
- Fresh Nuts, Vadayattukotta
- Gil Gal Cashew Exports, Pathanapuram
- Global Foods, Mangad
- Gouri Cashews, Alummoodu
- India Food Exports, Mundakkal West
- Indian Resins and Polymers, Chinnakada
- Ismail Enterprises, Kilikollur
- Jayalakshmi Cashew Exports, Decent Junction
- Jinnah Exports, Karicode
- Jinnah Shajahan Exports, Kilikollur
- John's Cashew Company, Kundara
- J.S. Cashew Exporters, Kilikollur
- Kailas Cashew Exports, Ezhukone
- Kairali Exports, Mangad
- Kasuwandi Enterprises, Killikolloor
- Kerala Nut Food Co., Parameswar Nagar
- Kerala State Cashew Workers Apex, Mundakkal West
- Krishnan Food Processors, Beach Road
- Kumar Cashew Exports, Punalur
- Kumbukattu Cashews, Valakam
- Lakshman & Co., Kilikollur
- Lekshmi Cashew Company, Kallumthazham
- Lourdes Matha Cashew Industries, Puthoor
- M. Abdul Rehuman Kunju, Chandanathope
- M M K Exports, Chandanathope
- Mahavishnu Cashew Factory, Karuvelil
- Malayalam Export Enterprises, Kilikollur
- Mangalath Cashews, Kannanallur
- Mangalath Enterprises, Ezhukone
- Mareena Cashew Exports, Kundara
- Meenakshi Exports, Umayanalloor
- M.G. Enterprises, Kilikollur
- Milleneum Exports & Imports, Vadakkevila
- Mount Carmel Cashews, Thalavoor
- Mount Moria Cashews, Ayoor
- Mumthas Cashew Industries, Kilikollur
- Najeem Cashew Industries, Kilikollur
- Navami Exports, Peroor
- Nice Cashew Company, Kollam
- Nila Exports, Cheerankavu
- Noble Cashew Industries, Decent Junction
- N.S. Cashews, Kilikollur
- Nut Products Company, Kochupilamoodu
- Nut Racer Corporation, Kilikollur
- Nuts on Time Importers and Exporters, Chathannoor
- Olam Agro India Ltd, Bishop Jerome Nagar
- Olimpiya Cashew industries, punthalathazham
- Painkily Cashews, Karunagappally
- Latha Cashew Imports & Exports, Karunagappally
- Peniel Cashew Co, Puthoor
- Prakash Exports, Kochupilamoodu
- Prasanthi Cashew Co., Mangad
- Prasanthi Cashew Pvt. Ltd., Mangad
- Pratap Cashew Co. Ltd., Kochupilamoodu
- Pratyush Exports, Kochupilamoodu
- Quilon Foods Private Limited, Parameswar Nagar
- Rahumath Cashew Corporation, Kilikollur
- Rajan Cashew Company, Ezhukone
- River Green Exports, Puthoor
- Riza Cashew Industries, Karicode
- Roy Cashew Products, Nallila
- Royal Food Exporters, Ayathil
- Sai Export Enterprises, Mangad
- Sai Lekshmi Cashew Company, Punukkannur
- Sai Lekshmi Foods, Asramam
- Saida Trading Company, Lakshminada
- Sealand Cashew, Karuvelil
- Sealand Cashew Exports, Ezhukone
- Shafi Cashew Industries, Kilikollur
- Shastha Enterprises, Beach Road
- Shyam Cashews, Kilikollur
- S.N. Cashews, Vadakkevila
- Soorya Cashew Factory, Karunagappally
- Souparnika Export Enterprises, Decent Junction
- South Kerala Cashew Exporters, Kilikollur
- Southern Cashew Exporters, Kilikollur
- Sree Durga Cashew Factory. Puthoor
- Sreelekshmi Cashew Company, Kadappakada
- S.S. Cashew Exports, Kilikollur
- St. Annes Cashew Industries, Puthoor
- St. George Foods, Kottarakara
- St. Gregorios Cashew Industries, Kottarakara
- St. John's Cashew Company, Kottarakara
- St. Mary's Cashew Factory, Kottarakara
- St. Mikhael Cashew Exports, Nallila
- St. Nicholas Cashew Exports, Nallila
- St. Paul's Cashew Factory, Puthoor
- St. Theresa Cashew Industries, Kottarakkara
- Star Cashew Company, Kilikollur
- Sultaj Exports, Karicode
- Sunfood Corporation, Kochupilamoodu
- Supreme Cashew Industries, Pallithottam
- Surya Exports, Kochupilamoodu
- Swathy Exports, Mundakkal West
- Tara Exports, Kilikollur
- Tara Foods, Kilikollur
- Tasty Nut Industries, Kilikollur
- Thampuran Cashews, Pallimon
- The Kerala State Cashew Development Corporation Ltd, Mundakkal
- Urbans Cashew ( Urban Stanislaus & Co), Mundakkal
- Unigreen Condiments, Perinad
- Vijayalaxmi Cashew Co., Kochupilamoodu
- Vinayaka Cashew Company, Mangad
- Vineeth Cashews, Kallumthazham
- Visudira Impex Pvt. Ltd., Kilikollur
- Vizag Exports, Mangad
- Wender's Foods Pvt Ltd, Kochupilamoodu
- Western India Cashew Co. Pvt Ltd, Kochupilamoodu
- Wonder Nut, Kottarakara
