= Cherupoika =

Village in Kerala, India

Cherupoika is a small village in the Kerala state of India. It is situated on the west side of Puthoor and in Kottarakkara taluk, in the district of Kollam and on the banks of the Kallada river.

== Etymology ==
Tha name is derived from cheru (small) and poika (lake).

== Economy ==
This small village is mainly dependent on agriculture. The area was covered with paddy fields, but most of these are now badly damaged by the mining of clay for bricks and a disappearing agricultural tradition. Old paddy fields are now big ponds and have converted this area into a big lake. In the near future, the area faces problems of unemployment, because of the shortage of clay for brick factories. Returning to agriculture is impossible because of severe damage to paddy fields and a shortage of ground water. The economy depends bricks manufacturing.

== Manpower ==
A scarcity of workers in this area attracts people from other states like West Bengal and Bihar, causing a social imbalance in the area. Many youths go outside the state and overseas, mainly to the Middle East, seeking jobs. Women are a major work force in the area in the brick factories and cashew factories in and around Puthur.

== Environmental problems ==
Inhabitants face many environmental hazards mainly because of a shortage of drinking water. Alcoholism is a main reason for social backwardness.

== Education facilities ==
There are two schools, Vanivila Govt L.P.S. and Govt. L.P.S Cherupoika.

The nearest upper primary, high school, T.T.I. and V.H.S.C. is K.N.N.M.M Schools in Pavithreswaram.

== Religion ==
Most of the inhabitants are Hindus, with a minority of Christians and Hindus living harmoniously. Cherupioka lord vishnu temple is the main worship centre for Hindus. There are two Christian churches.

== Infrastructure and facilities ==
A small canal connects the lake to Kallada river. A bridge connects the two sides of this area. Buses connect to the nearest places, but the roads in this area are severely damaged due to the lack of maintenance.

Two roads pass through, Puthoor-Pazhavara-Cherupoika-Pavithreswaram via Kollam and Puthoor-S.N Puram-Pannikkuzhi via Kallada.

This area is under the administration of Pavithreswaram panchayath and Pavithreswaram village, but there are no government offices. There is a post-office.

The nearest market is at Puthoor, nearly five kilometres away.
