= J. Alexander (politician) =

Indian politician (1938–2022)

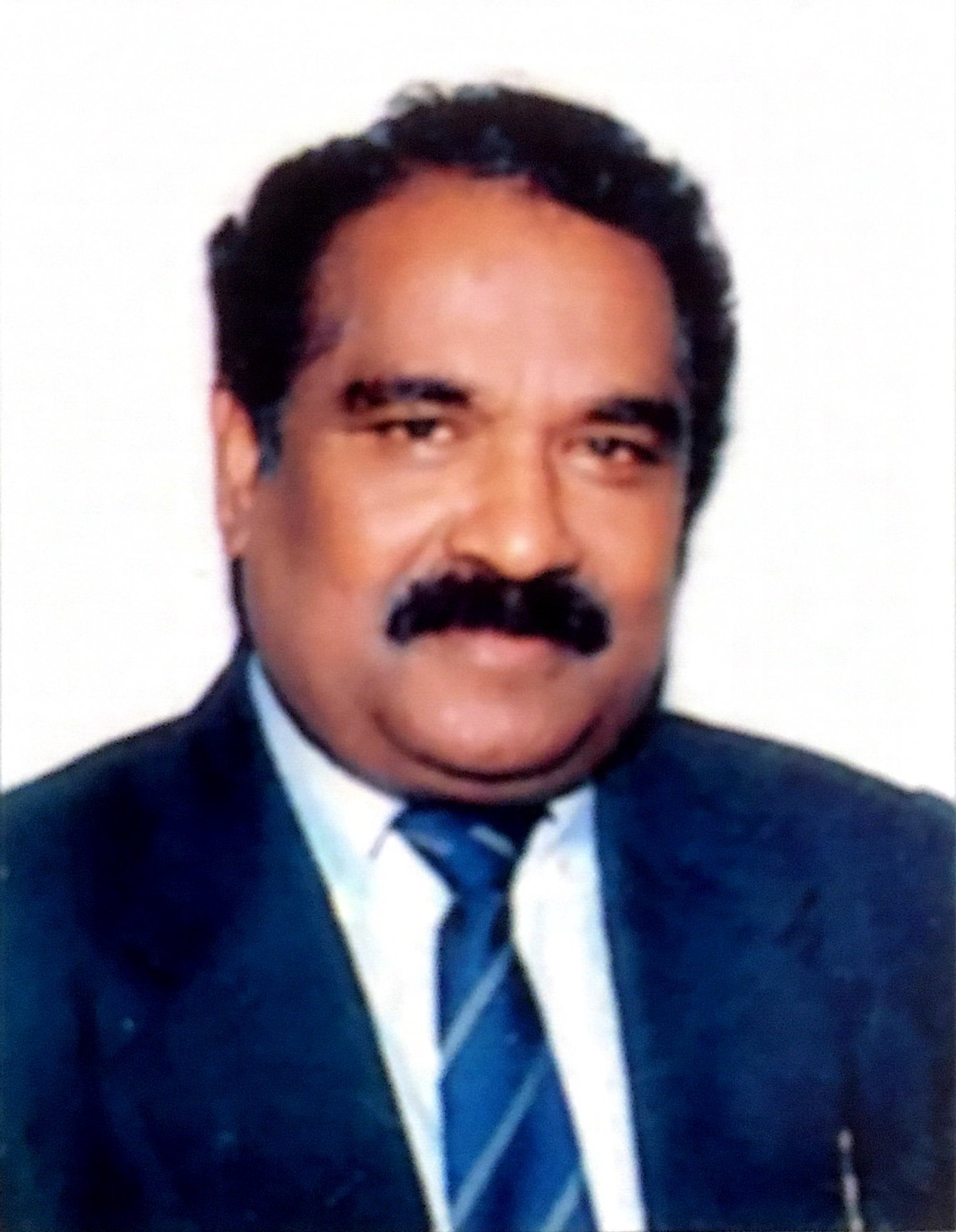

Minister of Tourism, Government of Karnataka
- In office 2003–2004

Chief Secretary, Government of Karnataka

Personal details
- Born: 8 August 1938 Kandachira, Mangad, Kollam, British Raj
- Died: 14 January 2022 (aged 83) Bangalore, Karnataka, India
- Party: Indian National Congress
- Spouse: Delfin
- Children: 2
- Education: University College, Trivandrum; Karnataka University
- Occupation: Bureaucrat; politician

Joseph Alexander (8 August 1938 – 14 January 2022) was an Indian bureaucrat and politician who served as Chief Secretary and Cabinet Minister, Karnataka State. He was the first Indian Administrative Service officer to serve as a minister in the State.

== Early life ==
Alexander was born in Mangad, in Kollam District of Kerala State on 8 August 1938 in a middle-class family; one out of seven children of John Joseph and Elizabeth Joseph. His early education was in Kollam until he finished B.A in English Language and Literature. He did his M.A in English Literature from University College, Trivandrum and did his PhD in Philosophy from Karnataka University.

After 10th examination he went to church in Kollam city to become the priest. After 2 years of completing the process of becoming priest his relative who was one of the senior father in church advised him to continue the study by seeing his academic excellence, later his principal Mr Ramaiiya motivated him to study for the IAS examination and also he provided related books. J Alexander later cracked the IAS examination successfully.

== Career ==
Alexander started his career as a lecturer in English in Fatima Mata National College, Kollam and joined the Indian Administrative Service (IAS) in 1963, where he was allotted to Karnataka State cadre.

First he taken charge as assistant commisner at Kundapura Dakshina Kannada Karnataka. He served for 33 years in various departments as district commissioner and district magistrate of Dharwad District, Karnataka, revenue commissioner of Karnataka State and chairman, Karnataka State Revenue Appellate Tribunal, commissioner and chief executive of Bangalore City Municipal Corporation. chairman of the Bangalore Development Authority, Bangalore Water Supply and Sewerage Board, Karnataka state Urban water supply and sewerage board, Slum Clearance Board, and housing board.

He was also chief executive of Karnataka State Road Transport Corporation, chairman and managing director, Mangalore Chemicals & Fertilizers, Mangalore, and chairman of several other enterprises. He was appointed chief secretary by then Chief Minister, Sarekoppa Bangarappa.

After retirement from the civil service, he joined the Indian National Congress, and contested elections to the Karnataka Legislative Assembly. He became a member of the Legislative Assembly from Bharathi Nagar (presently Sarvagnanagar) in Bangalore, and became a cabinet minister for tourism in S. M. Krishna Ministry. In the process, he became the first former IAS officer to become a Minister in Karnataka. Later, he became vice-president of Karnataka Pradesh Congress Committee, Karnataka. He left the Indian National Congress in 2019, claiming that the party neglected Christians. However, he stayed on after being convinced by senior leaders.

He served as president of Bangalore City YMCA for more than 30 years. He was also advisory board member in Global Organization of People of Indian Origin(GOPIO), board of governors of Xavier Institute of Management and Entrepreneurship Bangalore and chairman of its branch in KOCHI, Kerala.

J Alexander and Karnataka DG& IGP Shankar Bidari both were giving guest lectures at Vedhik IAS Academy in Cochin Kerala.

== Personal life and death ==
Alexander was married to Delfin Alexander, with whom he had two sons. He died from a heart attack at a hospital in Bangalore, on 14 January 2022, at the age of 83, due to COVID-19.

After the death IAS officer Lakshminarayan, IPS officer Shankar Bidari Educationist Abraham Ebenezer, Rajendra who was Alexander's close associated and others all together founded J Alexander Foundation. Through this foundation the social activities are being organised.
