= Chittumala Chira =

Freshwater wetland in Kerala, India

Coordinates: 9.009°N 76.670°E

Chittumala Chira (ചിറ്റുമല ചിറ), or Chittumala Lake, is a freshwater wetland located in the Chittumala block of Kollam district. The residents of Perayam, Pavithreswaram, and East Kallada rely on the lake for their drinking water needs. Chittumala Lake spans approximately 55 hectares. Until 1988, the practice of Punchakrishi (a traditional farming method) was widely carried out in the area known as Chira. The water bodies seen adjacent to this are Sasthamkotta Lake, Cherupola Lake, and some other freshwater lake.

== History ==
During the early Holocene epoch, as the Earth experienced a warming trend, significant rainfall led to the flooding of existing river valleys. This flooding, which occurred approximately 8,500 to 5,500 years ago, submerged extensive riparian forests with sediments from nearby lateritic hills. Consequently, the vast Pleistocene forests were transformed into swamps, marshes, and lakes. Around 4,000 years ago, as sea levels receded, sediments began to accumulate at the heads of river mouths, leading to the formation of the Kerala Bay Head Delta. This delta extended seawards, gradually filling half of Ashtamudi. The combined effects of river meandering, migration, and rapid sedimentation, as evidenced by borehole sedimentary records, resulted in the transformation of several broad, scoured valleys into freshwater bodies, such as Sasthamkotta Lake, Cherupola Lake, and Chittumala Lake.

== Water scarcity ==
A few years ago, the commencement of water extraction for industrial purposes in Kundara led to the depletion of the aquifer. In response, the Kollam Sub-Divisional Magistrate's Court imposed a ban on water extraction for ceramics during April and May. This ban remains in effect to this day.
