= Chandanathope =

Chandanathope Chandanathoppu
- town
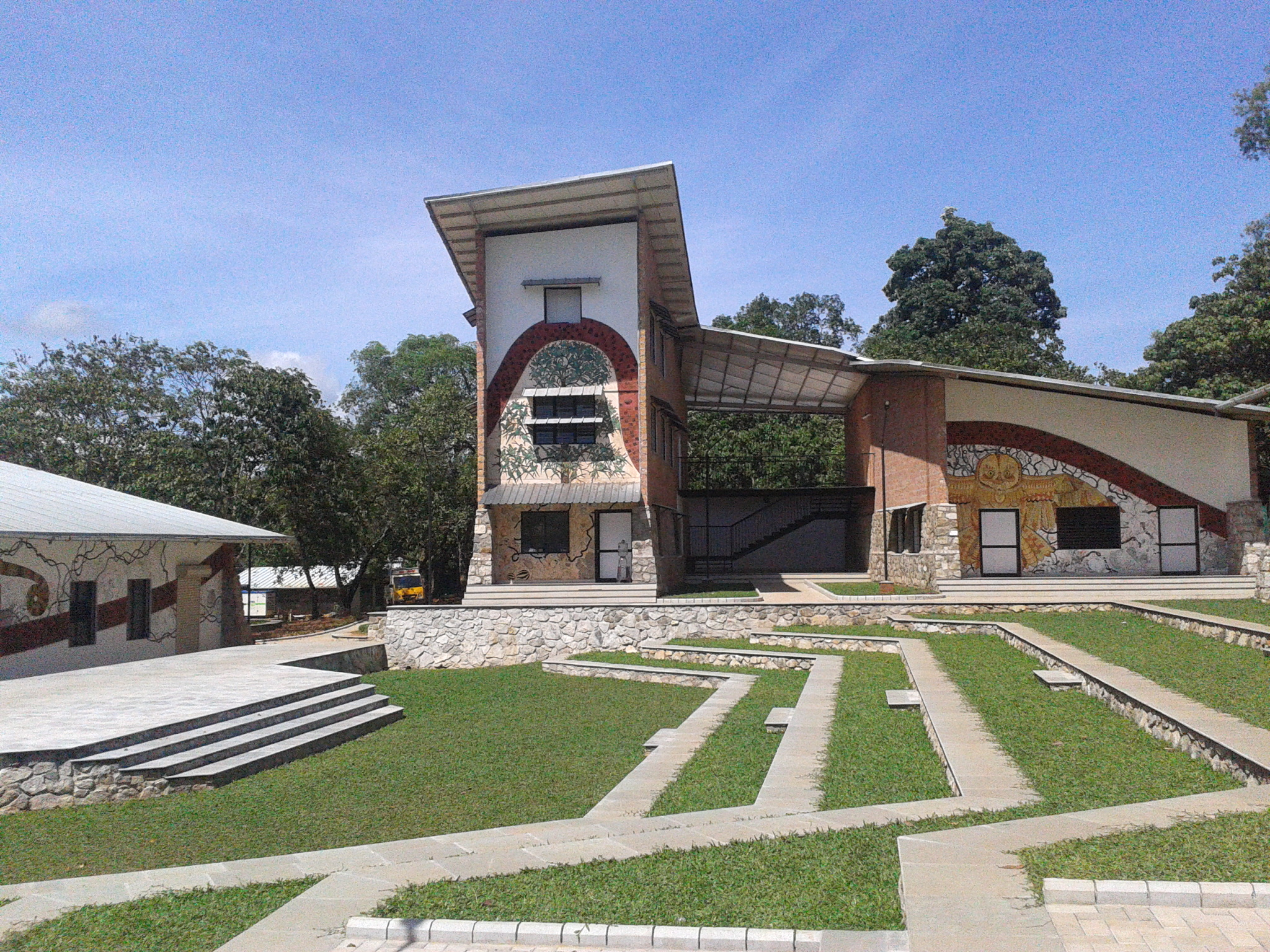
- KSID in Chandanathoppe

- Location in Kerala, India
- Coordinates: 8.929893°N 76.641755°E
- Country: India
- State: Kerala
- District: Kollam

Government
  - Body: Kollam Municipal Corporation(KMC)

Languages
  - Official: Malayalam, English
- Time zone: UTC+5:30 (IST)
- PIN: 691014
- Vehicle registration: KL-02
- Lok Sabha constituency: Kollam
- Civic agency: Kollam Municipal Corporation
- Avg. summer temperature: 34 °C (93 °F)
- Avg. winter temperature: 22 °C (72 °F)
- Website: http://www.kollam.nic.in

Chandanathope is a town located in Kollam district, Kerala. It lies 5 kilometers from Kundara and 8 kilometres (5.0 mi) from Kollam city centre on the Kollam–Thirumangalam National Highway 744. It was known as a major hub of cashew processing and its exports two major cashew exporters of Kollam namely VLC Cashews (India Food Exports) and MARK has their facilities in the town.

== Etymology ==
In Malayalam, the name denotes a place with sandalwood plantations. There are many sandalwood trees found in and around Chandanathoppe but no historical evidence exist regarding any large scale planatations.

== History ==
The town developed as a market along Quilon Sengottai Road, the trunk route that connected Quilon with Madras Presidency.

Chandanathope enjoys a significant position in the political history of Kerala due to a police firing that happened here in 1958, against a group of cashew workers who were in an agitation demanding rights of cashew workers under the banner of Kundara Cashew Workers Union. This police firing that happened while the state was ruled by a workers party, the Communist Party of India This incident made their ally RSP join the Vimochana Samaram against the communist government which later along with a series of developments in other parts of the state, finally culminated in the toppling of Communist government by EMS.

A column was erected at Chandanathope in memory of Raman and Sulaiman, two men who were killed by the police firing on 26 July 1958 as a result of protests by cashew workers and who became martyrs in the fight for the rights of the cashew workers.

In 1964 an Industrial Training Institute was started in Chandanathope by Government of Kerala.

In 1989 Chandanattop railway station was started as a halt station in the town on Kollam–Sengottai Chord Line by S. Krishna Kumar.

== Administration and Politics ==
The town comes under multiple local bodies such as Kollam Municipal Corporation, Perinad Grama panchayat (Chittumala Block panchayat) and Kottamkara Grama panchayat (Mukhathala Block panchayat) for the purpose of local administration under Panchayati raj. It falls under Kollam Taluk of Kollam revenue district wholly.

It falls within Kollam (Lok Sabha constituency) in parliamentary representation and in state assembly it is represented by Kundara Assembly constituency and Kollam Assembly constituency.

The region has presence of major national and state political parties namely Communist Party of India (Marxist), Revolutionary Socialist Party (India), Bharatiya Janata Party, Social Democratic Party of India etc.

== Economy ==
The economy of town is largely dependent on small scale industries. The most prominent industry and largest employer is Cashew industry. There are also numerous sawmills, furniture works, matchstick makers etc. who are active in the town. There are lot of furniture shops in the town.

The two biggest cashew companies in town are VLC Cashews established in 1957 and MARK Cashews established in 1974. There is also a PVC pipe manufacturing company called Traplast PVC Pipes & Chemicals by MARK Group which is operational since 1983.

In agricultural perspective there is marginal paddy cultivation in Kaduvachira wetland and there are numerous small scale dairy farmers and milk societies.

== Religion ==
Important places of worship include the Chandanathope Juma Mosque, Mukaluvil Juma Mosque Munpala Kavu, Kuzhiyathu kavu temple Kaduvachira Sree Vana Durga Devi temple and Aayiravillan Shiva temple.

The major religions practiced by people of the town are Hinduism and Islam.

== Transport ==
Chandanathoppe is well connected with various important towns in Kollam district through Kerala State Road Transport Corporation buses and Kollam city buses of Elampalloor route.

National Highway 744 (India) passes through Chandanathope. Another major roads of Chandanathoppe are Perinad ESI Road and Chathinamkulam – Kandachira Cheepu Road.

Chandanattop railway station is a railway station in Kollam-Shenkottai Rail route, that is located in the town. Kilikollur railway station is also located nearby.

Nearest Airport- Trivandrum International Airport approx: 65 km. 1 hour 30 mins.

== Education ==
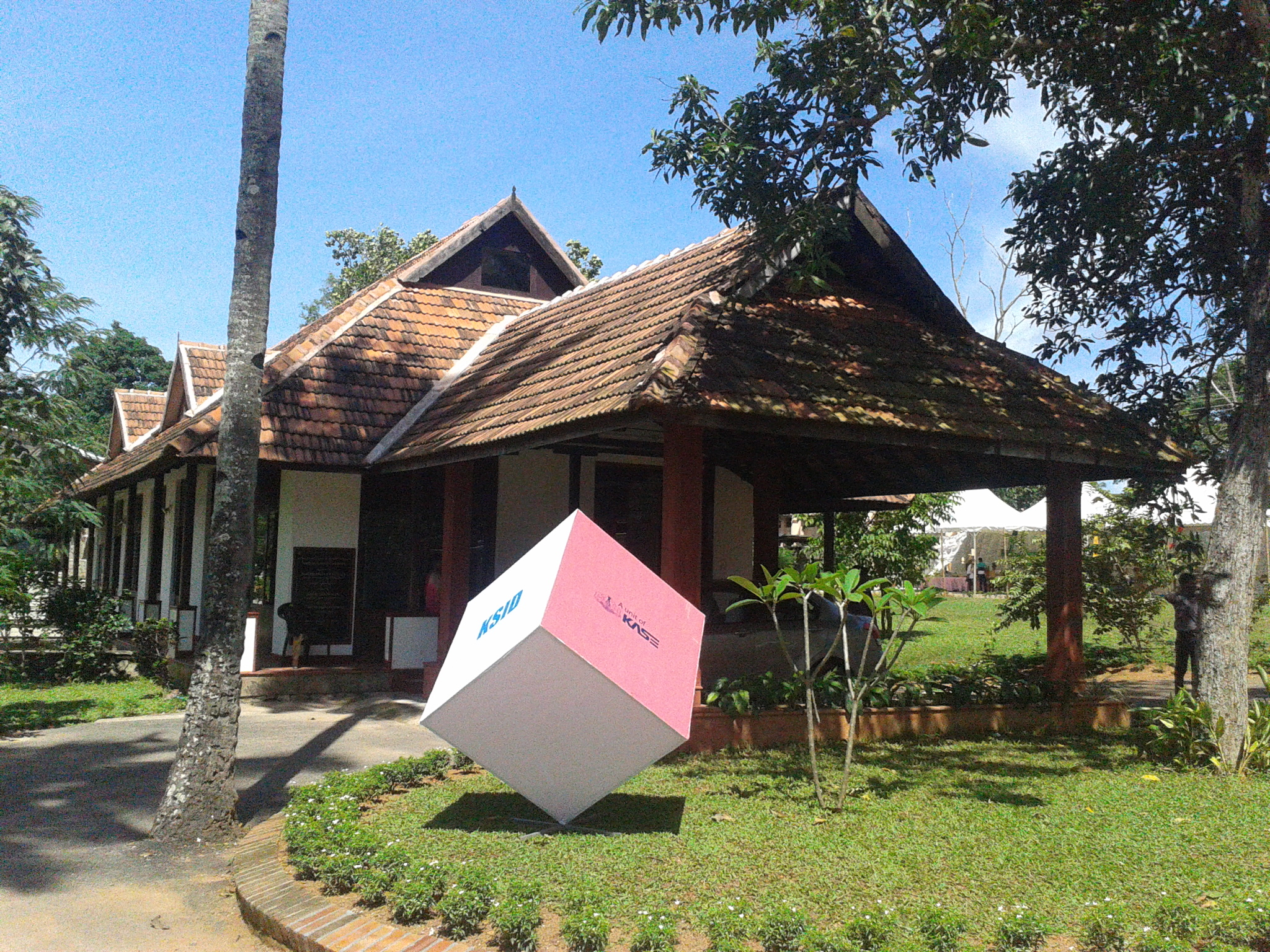
Kerala State Institute of Design

Govt ITI Chandanathope is situated here, it's a premier skill development institute in the district. There is a Basic Training Institute also that is situated in ITI Complex. Kerala State Institute of Design (KSID), a design institute under Department of labour and Skills, Government of Kerala, is located here.

Chandanathope also has other educational institutions such as Chinmaya Vidyalaya Kollam, UHRD Center, MSM Higher Secondary School, Sivaram High-school, Govt LPS Kuzhiyam etc.

It has an Annexure of Azeezia Medical College.

== See also ==
- Kundara
- Perinad
