= Cashew Export Promotion Council of India =

Board promoting food exports

- CEPCI

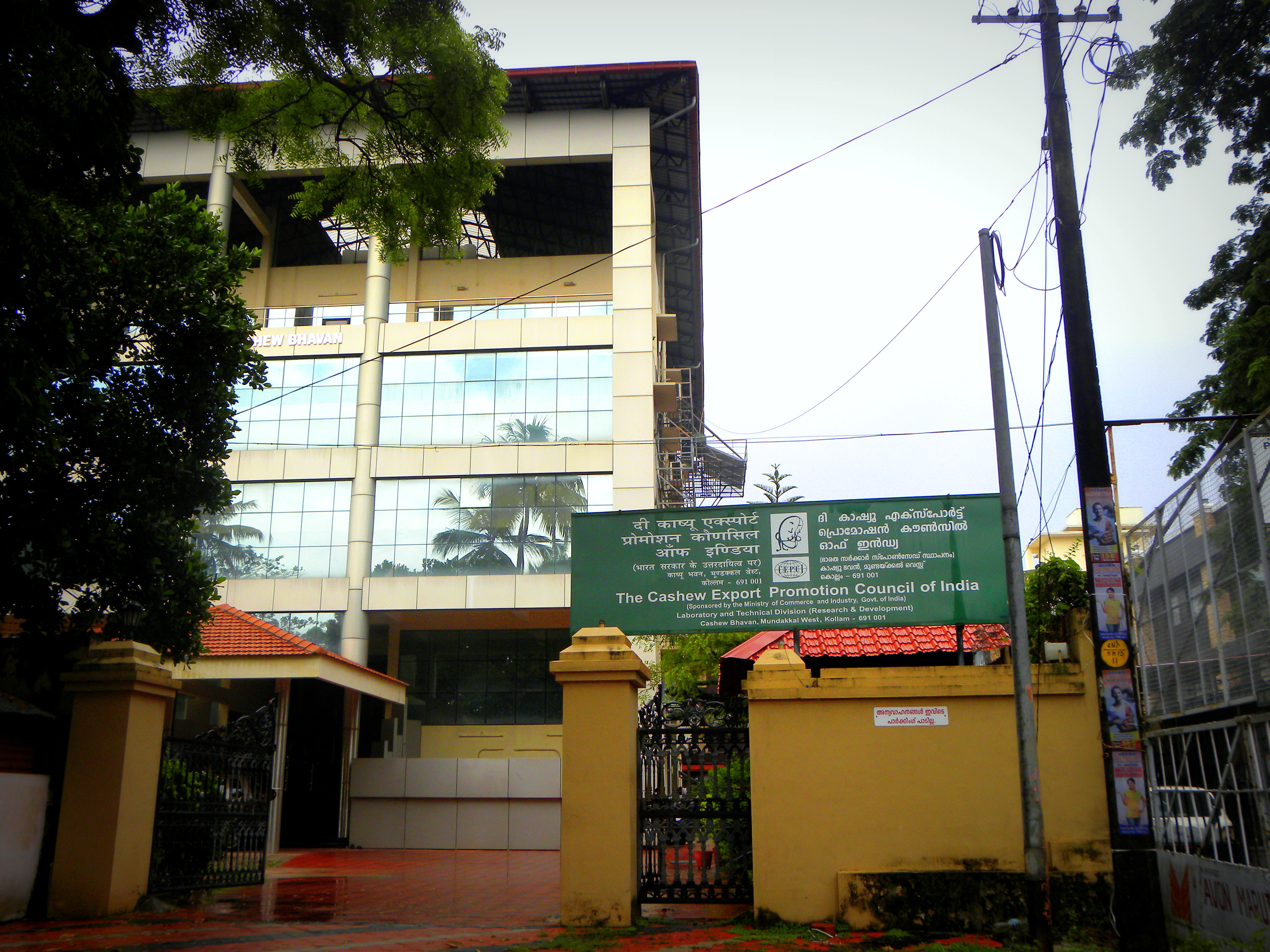
- CEPCI Headquarters in Kollam city

Agency overview
- Formed: 12 September 1974
- Jurisdiction: Government of India
- Headquarters: Mundakkal, Kollam, India; 8.878204°N 76.595194°E
- Minister responsible: Piyush Goyal, Minister of Commerce
- Agency executives: Dr. Noordeen Abdul, Chairman; A. Abdul Salam, Vice Chairman
- Parent agency: Department of Commerce, Government of India
- Website: www.cashewindia.org

The Cashew Export Promotion Council of India or CEPC or CEPCI was established by the Government of India in 1955, with the active cooperation of the cashew industry with the object of promoting exports of cashew kernels and cashew nut shell liquid from India. It is headquartered in Mundakkal in the city of Kollam, Kerala. The Council serves as an intermediary between importers of cashew kernels and exporters who are members of the council. The council is also supposed to deal with any disputes on exports or imports arising on account of quality standards, breach of contractual obligations, etc. It undertakes numerous activities, such as organizing global buyer-seller meets, organizing studies on the nutritional aspects of cashew and providing support to cashew processors and exporters for improving infrastructure.

In 2013–14, India exported 113,620 metric tonnes of cashew shipments which also constituted 9226 metric tonnes of cashew nut shell liquid (CNSL), generating revenues US$825.89 million and US$6.18 million respectively. Cashew Export Promotion Council of India have offices in Kollam, Kochi and Mangalore. There are 238 registered cashew exporters in Cashew Export Promotion Council of India as members. In that, more than 200 exporters are based in Kollam. An examination of the records show that Kilikollur, a suburb of Kollam city, had the most cashew processing factories.

== Cashew export business in India ==
India is on top nowadays in exporting cashew kernels and cashew nut shell liquid (CNSL). Foreign exchange earned by the country through export of cashew kernels during 2011–12 touched Rs.4,390 crore as per statistics of Cashew Export Promotion Council of India. 1.31 lakh tonnes of kernel were exported during 2011–12; 80% of India's export quality cashew kernels are prepared in Kollam. United States of America (USA) is the biggest importer of cashew kernel from India (47,611 tonnes during 2011-12 for a cost of Rs.1,470.47 crore). They are the biggest importer of CNSL from India. United Arab Emirates (UAE) stood second in kernel import (14,173 tonnes during 2011-12 for a cost of Rs.606.11 crore). Other major importers were Netherlands, Japan, Saudi, Spain, Germany, Belgium, Singapore, Italy, Greece, Australia, Kuwait, Egypt, Turkey, Jordan, Canada, Thailand, Russia, Norway, Syria, and Hong Kong. CEPCI is expecting a rise in export, i.e. 275,000 tonnes by 2020, a growth of 120 per cent over the present exports.

== Biggest importers of cashew kernel from India ==
Country	Exported quantity	Value	Year
USA	47,611 tonnes	Rs.1,470.47 crore	2011-12
UAE	14,173 tonnes	Rs.606.11 crore	2011-12
Netherlands	11,517 tonnes	Rs.365.57 crore	2011-12
Japan	--	Rs.237.45 crore	2011-12
Saudi Arabia	--	Rs.207.01 crore	2011–12

== CEPC Laboratory and Technical Division ==
The CEPC Laboratory and Technical Division was established by The Cashew Export Promotion Council of India (CEPC) in 1997. It is situated at Cashew Bhavan, Mundakkal, Kollam city. The lab is capable to do food products testing, water testing and other quality-based testing services. They also offer consultancy services to the food processing industry and field surveys. There is a plan to set up a quarantine facility and a cashew testing lab at the Kollam Port with the support of the Cashew Export Promotion Council.

=== Facilities ===
- Analytical equipment
- Library
- Research facilities
- Microbiology Department
- Chemistry Department
- Biotechnology Department

== See also ==
- Cashew business in Kollam
- Kollam
- Cashew
- List of cashew companies based in Kollam
- Kerala State Cashew Development Corporation Limited
