= CTPE =

CTPE may refer to:

- CT scan for pulmonary emboli
- Chandanattop railway station
