= Pangodu =

Village in Kollam District, Kerala, India

Pangodu is a rural village near Puthur in Kollam district of Kerala state.

It situated in the banks of the Kallada River. It is located on the Kottarakara-Karunagapaly route.

== Economy ==
The economy is based upon agriculture. There are some brick factories and one cashew processing factory is working here.

== Education ==
There is a very old high school, Kuzhikkalidavaka H.S. One Ayurveda Medical college is working here.

== Important persons ==
Former Kerala Chief Minister Late Sri. R. Sankar was born in this village.
