= Kerala State Institute of Design =

Design school in Kollam, India

Kerala State Institute of Design, Kollam
- കേരള സ്റ്റേറ്റ് ഇൻസ്റ്റിറ്റ്യൂട്ട് ഓഫ് ഡിസൈൻ
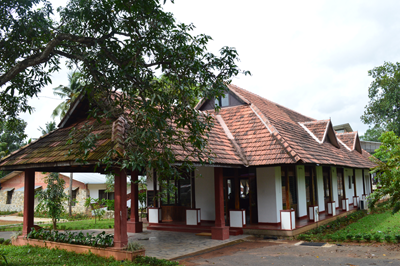
- Type: Public educational institution
- Established: 2008
- Affiliations: KTU, AICTE
- Chairman: Shri. TP Ramakrishnan
- Director: Dr. Usha Titus IAS
- Location: Chandanathope, Kollam, Kerala, India
- Campus: Suburban 31,000 sq.ft
- Website: KSID.ac.in

Kerala State Institute of Design (KSID) , a design institute under Department of labour and Skills, Government of Kerala, is located at Chandanathope, about 8 Kilometers from Kollam city. It was established in 2008 with the support of NID Ahmedabad and is one of the first state-owned design institutes in India. The faculty development programme and curriculum development for the design programmes of KSID are provided by NID Ahmedabad. KSID currently conducts Post Graduate Diploma Programs in Design developed in association with National Institute of Design, Ahmedabad.

The Kerala State Institute of Design (KSID) was established for the purpose of creating a vibrant design community in Kerala through synergistic partnership between artisan community, professional designers and general public. The institute was later merged with Kerala Academy for Skills Excellence (KASE) on 1 April 2014. KASE is the apex agency for all skill development activities in the state of Kerala. One of the most important objectives of KSID is to promote design education. To realise this objective, KSID is offering Bachelor of Design (B.Des) and Post Graduate Diploma programs in Design which were developed in consideration of Design Programmes at National Institutes of Design (NID) and Indian Institutes of Technology (IIT).

== Location ==
The Institute is situated at Chandanathope in the outskirts of the city of Kollam.

== Affiliation ==
KSID is affiliated to the All India Council for Technical Education (AICTE), as well as to APJ Abdul Kalam Technological University (KTU) and is now commencing a Four year Bachelor of Design (B.Des) programme.

== Academic programmes ==
Undergraduate programme - Bachelor of Design (B.Des);

B.Des programme is for four years and the total number of seats are limited to 30 per batch.

KSID offers Post Graduate Diploma Programs in three domains;

- Integrated Lifestyle Product Design
- Integrated Textile and Apparel Design
- IT Integrated Communication Design.

== Design Intervention Centre ==
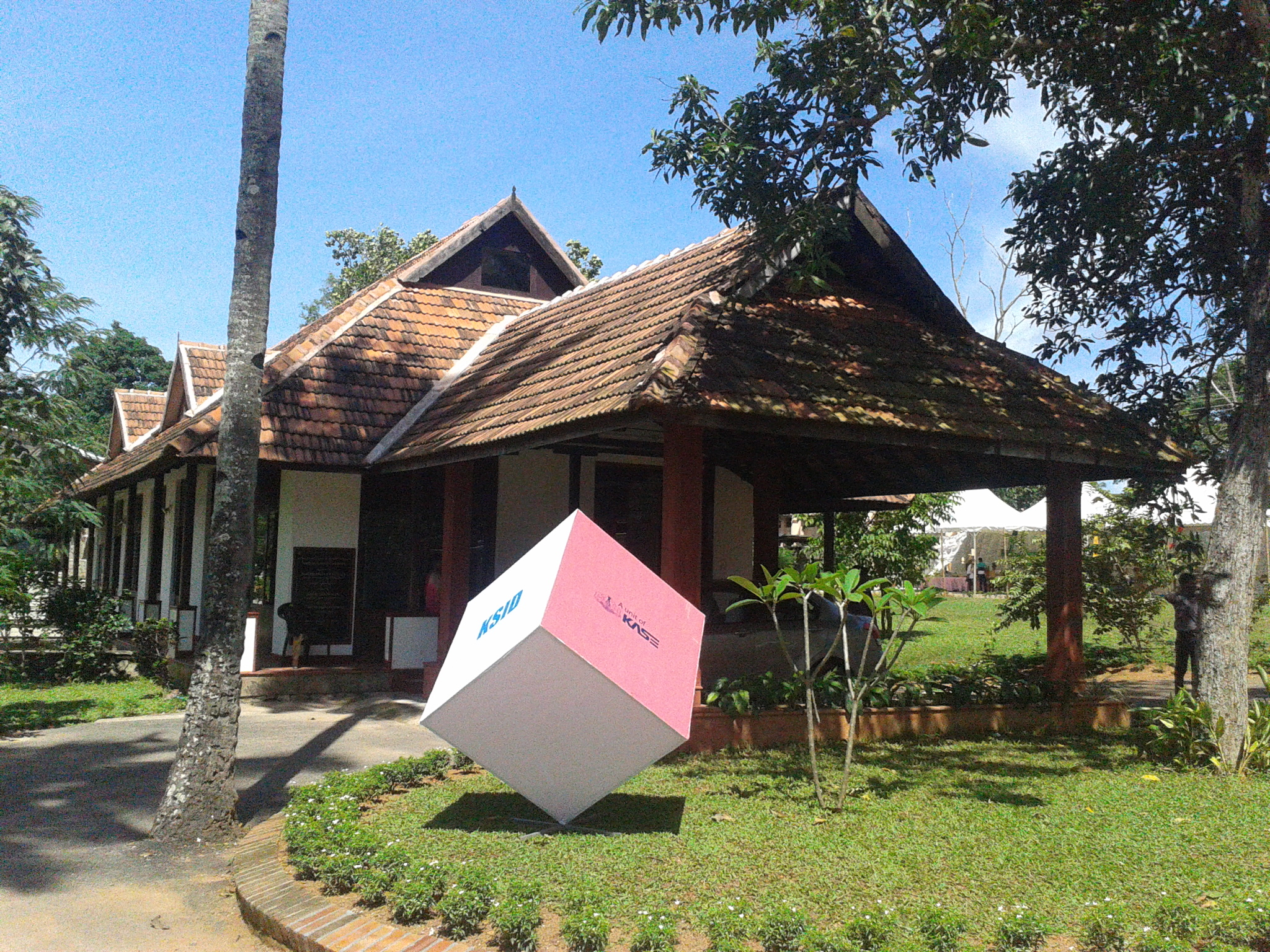
KSID front view

The Design Intervention Centre is the arm of KSID which offers advisory and support services in Design, as well as conducts research in the field of design.

== Future ==
- Nov 2018 - Kerala State Institute of Design is planning to collaborate with plans to collaborate with National Institute of Design (NID) in Ahmedabad to improve the curriculum and educational prospects. Government of Kerala will sanction 9 crores in the next budget for the developments of the institute.
