= Chandanattop railway station =

Railway station in Kerala, India

Chandanathoppe Chandanattop
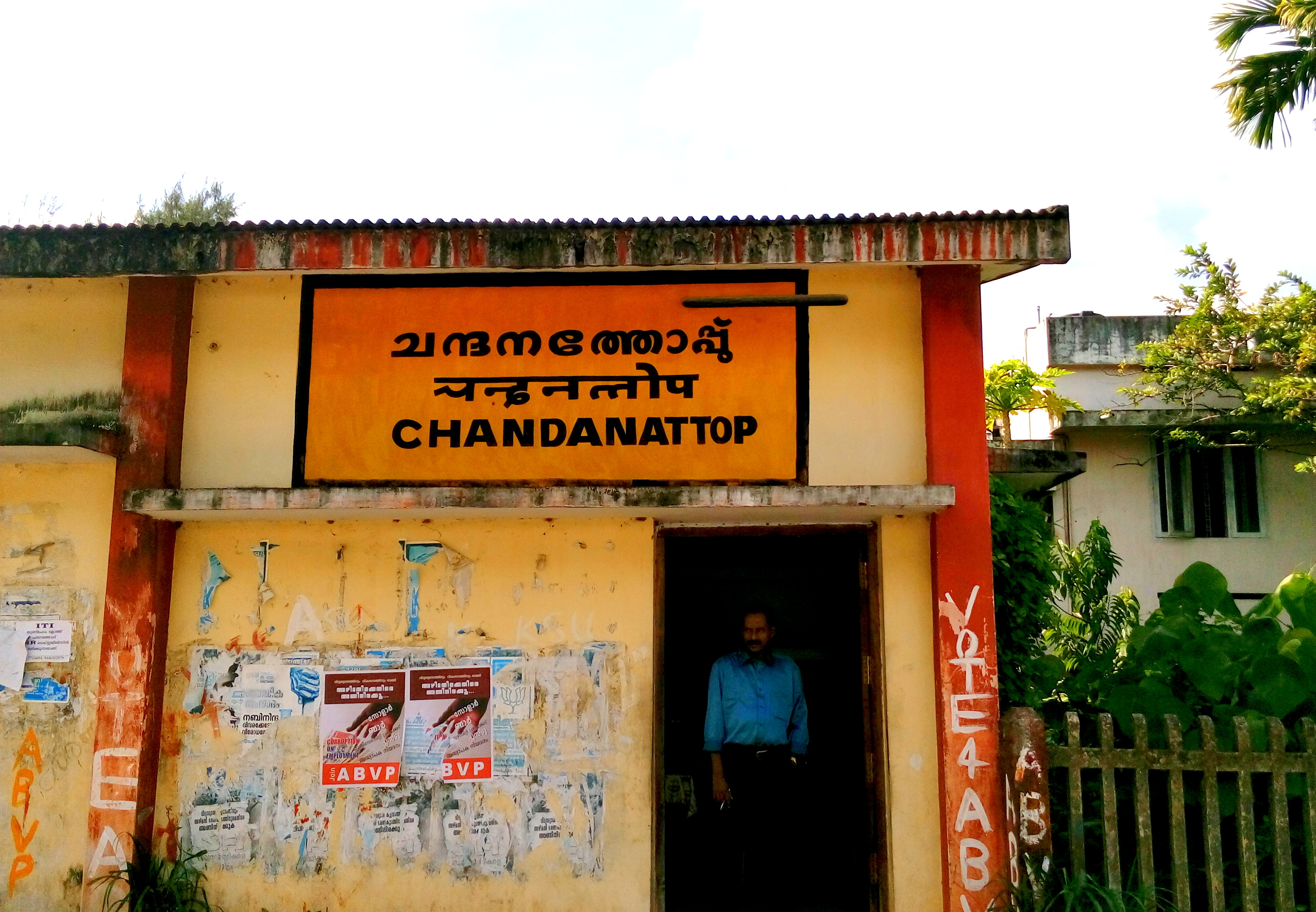

General information
- Location: Mamood, NH-744, Chandanathoppe, Kollam, Kerala; India
- Coordinates: 8.929914°N 76.641712°E
- System: Regional rail, Light rail & Commuter rail station
- Owner: Indian Railways
- Operator: Southern Railway zone
- Line: Kollam–Sengottai branch line
- Platforms: 1
- Tracks: 1

Construction
- Structure type: At–grade
- Parking: Available

Other information
- Status: Functioning
- Station code: CTPE
- Zone(s): Southern Railway zone
- Division(s): Madurai
- Fare zone: Indian Railways

History
- Opened: 1904; 122 years ago

Passengers
- 2017–18: 131 per day 47,689 per year

Services
Preceding station	Indian Railways	Following station
Kilikollur towards	Southern Railway zone Kollam–Sengottai branch line	Kundara towards
Route map
Location
- Location within India Location within Kerala

Chandanathoppe railway station (Code:CTPE) or Chandanattop railway station is an 'F-class' halt railway station situated at Kollam–Sengottai branch line of Southern Railway zone, India. It is one among the 25 railway stations in Kollam district. The station is partially serving the city of Quilon. Chandanathoppe railway station is coming under the Madurai railway division of the Southern Railway zone, Indian Railways. The nearest major rail head of Chandanathoppe railway station is Kollam Junction railway station.

Indian Railways is connecting Chandanathoppe with various cities in India like Kollam, Thiruvananthapuram, Tirunelveli, Madurai & with various towns like Paravur, Punalur, Kottarakkara, Nagercoil, Varkala & Neyyattinkara. Nearest railway stations are Kundara and Kilikollur. All the Kollam–Punalur–Kollam passenger services and Punalur–Madurai–Punalur service have halts at Chandanathoppe

== Significance ==
Chandanattop railway station is situated at the borders of Kollam city. Chandanathoppe is one among the cashew hubs of Kollam city. It is the nearest railway station to Govt. ITI, Chandanathope. People from areas like Mammoodu, Mekone, Kuzhiyam, a portion of Kilikollur etc. are depending on this railway station.

Kilikollur station is situated 1.7 km away from Chandanattop, it is the shortest distance between two railway stations in India.

The station was inaugurated as a halt station in 1989–90 by then Member of parliament from Kollam (Lok Sabha constituency) Shri. S. Krishna Kumar following demand from students of Govt. ITI, Chandanathope. The old station building having ticket counter was abandoned following gauge conversion in 2007–2010 period.

== Services ==
Train number	Source	Destination	Name/Type
56332	Kollam Junction	Punalur	Passenger
56331	Punalur	Kollam Junction	Passenger
56334	Kollam Junction	Punalur	Passenger
56700	Madurai	Punalur	Passenger
56333	Punalur	Kollam Junction	Passenger
56336	Kollam Junction	Punalur	Passenger
56335	Punalur	Kollam Junction	Passenger
56701	Punalur	Madurai	Passenger
56338	Kollam Junction	Punalur	Passenger
56337	Punalur	Kollam Junction	Passenger

== See also ==
- Kollam Junction railway station
- Paravur railway station
- Kundara railway station
- Kilikollur railway station
