= Kandachira =

- Village
- Location within Kerala
- Coordinates: 9.0927°N 76.8612°E
- Country: India
- State: Kerala
- District: Kollam
- Taluk: Kollam

Languages
  - Official: Malayalam, Tamil
- Time zone: UTC+5:30 (IST)
- Vehicle registration: KL-02, KL-25, KL-77
- Nearest city: Kollam Kottarakara Punalur
- Lok Sabha constituency: Kollam
- Assembly constituency: Eravipuram
- Literacy: 93.63%

Kandachira is a village situated near Kollam in Kollam District, Kerala state, India.

== Politics ==
Manchallor is a part of Eravipuram assembly constituency in Kollam (Lok Sabha constituency). Shri. M. Noushad is the current MLA of Eravipuram. Shri.N.K. Premachandran is the current member of parliament of Kollam.

== Geography ==
Kandachira is a village in Panayam panchayat in Kollam district. It is situated in Kandachiramudi of Ashtamudi Lake. Kandachira is in the south of Panayam panchayat. The bridge in this place connects places Kandachira, Kilikollur, Chathinamkulam etc. Kandachira bridge is a main landmark of Kandachira.

== Transport ==
Perinad is the nearest railway station of Kandachra. The railway line to Kollam is passes through Kandachira.
