= Kollam Port =

Kollam Port കൊല്ലം തുറമുഖം
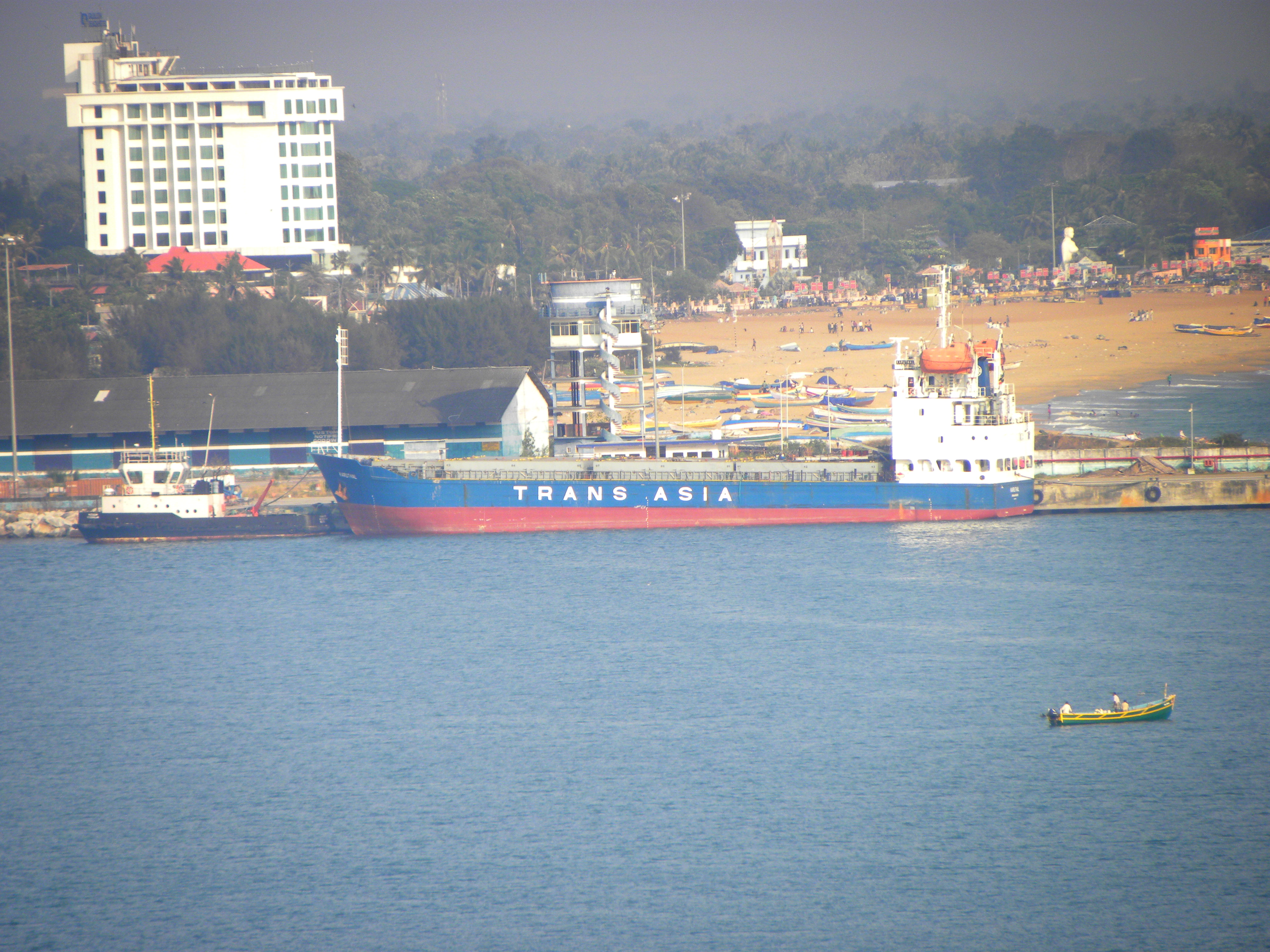
- Kollam Port
- Interactive map of Kollam Port കൊല്ലം തുറമുഖം

Location
- Country: India
- Location: City of Kollam
- Coordinates: 8.87749°N 76.58314°E
- UN/LOCODE: IN KUK

Details
- Opened: AD 825; 1201 years ago Renovated in 2007; 19 years ago
- Operated by: Kerala Maritime Board, Government of Kerala
- Owned by: Government of Kerala
- Land area: 10.6 acres (0.043 km^{2})
- Size: 44 acres (0.18 km^{2})
- No. of berths: 2
- No. of wharfs: 1 (178 metres); 2 (101 metres)
- Port Officer: Arun Kumar P K
- World Port Index Number: 49160
- Electronic Data Interchange Code(EDI): INKUK1
- Immigration checkpost: Yes

Statistics
- Vessel arrivals: 163 (after 2007)
- Value of cargo: 2.2 million tonnes
- Annual revenue: ₹3 crore (2024) ₹62 lakhs (2013)
- Cranes: 2
- Main imports: Sand, Cashew, Tiles
- Passenger Terminal: 288m
- Website www.keralaports.gov.in

Kollam Port or Port of Quilon is one of the oldest ports (established in AD 825) situated 4 kilometres (2.5 mi) away from Downtown Kollam (formerly Quilon) It is the third largest port in Kerala by volume of cargo handled and facilities and one of the four Kerala ports having immigration checkpoint (ICP) facility. Located on the south-west coast of India, it was an important port from the ninth to the seventeenth centuries. Kollam was one of the five Indian ports visited by Ibn Battuta.

== History ==
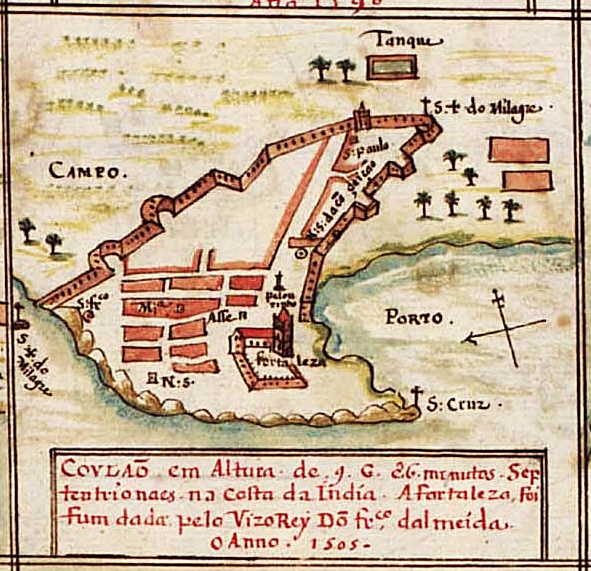
Kollam in the 1500s

Kollam was a port city of the Chera Dynasty until the formation of the independent Venad kingdom, of which it became the capital. Prior to that, Kollam was considered one of the four early entrepots in the global sea trade around the 13th century, along with Alexandria and Cairo in Egypt, the Chinese city of Quanzhou, and Malacca in the Malaysian archipelago.

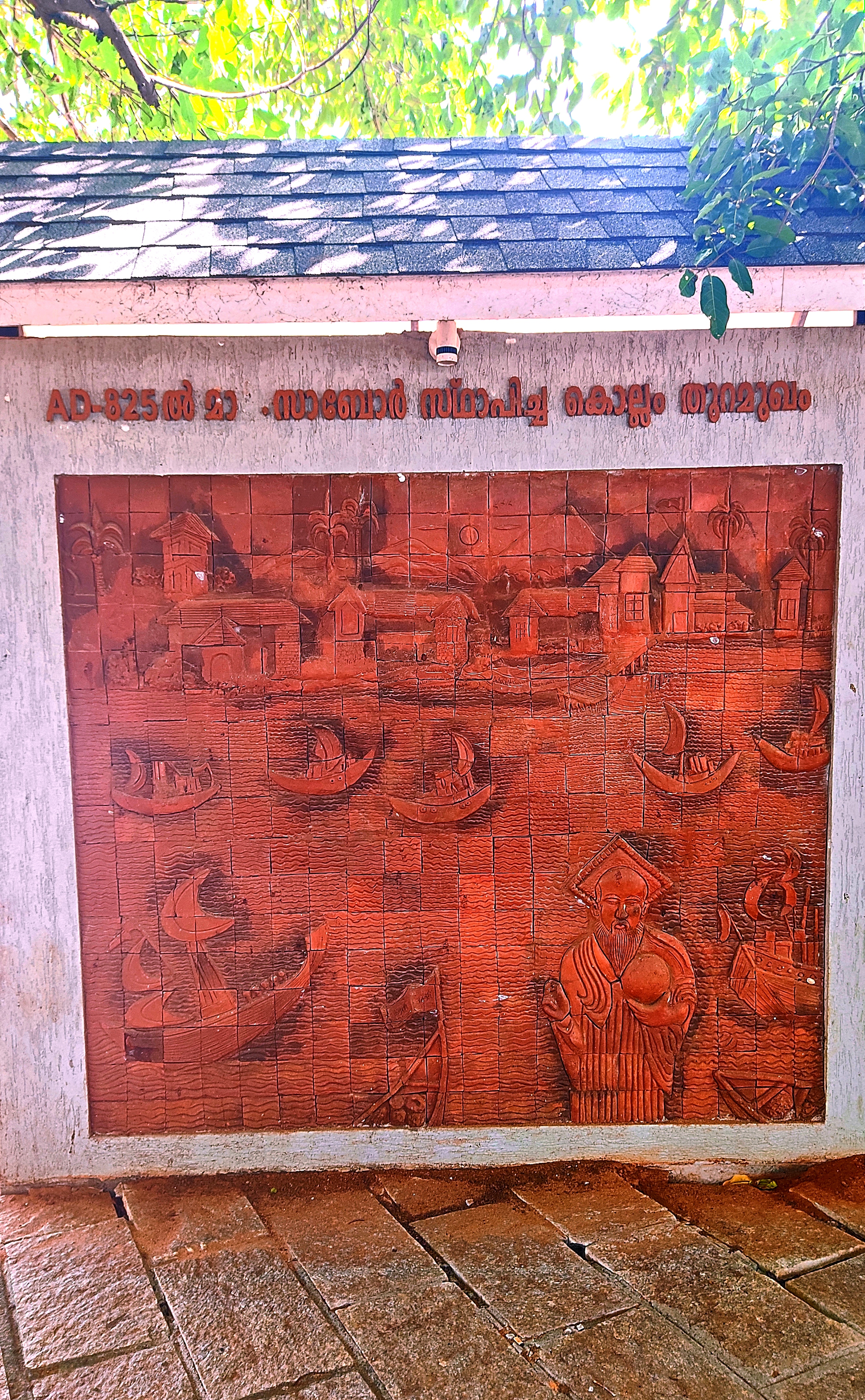
Relief in Ashramam, Kollam

The port was founded by Mar Abo with sanction from Udayamarthandavarma the Tamil king of the Venad in 825 as an alternative to reopening the inland seaport of Kore-ke-ni Kollam near Backare (Thevalakara) also known as Nelcynda and Tyndis to the Romans and the Greeks and Thondi to the Tamils and is also the foundation of the new city. It is also believed that Mar Abo actually volunteered to the Chera king to create a new seaport town near at Kollam instead of his request for renewing the almost vanishing Tyndis or Nelcynda inland seaport ( kore-ke-ni) at Kollam, lying idle without trade for a few centuries because of the Cheras being overrun by Pallavas in the 6th century AD ending the spice trade from Malabar coast. This allowed Mar Abo to stay for many decades in Chera kingdom and streamline Christian faith among the Nampoothiri Vaishnavites &Nair sub-castes in the St. Thomas tradition with Syrian liturgy as Reference for the Doctrine of Trinity without replacing the Sanskrit and Vedic prayers. The Chinese traders were one of the oldest foreign communities to settle in Kollam. That was the period when Kollam evolved as a major trade center (of spices) and an important port along the Malabar coast.

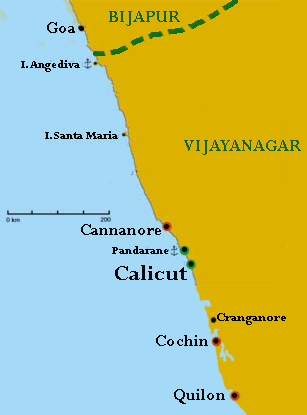
Kerala ports and cities c. 1500

In January 2014, the port trust discovered thousands of Chinese coins and Stone Age weapons at Kollam Port, revealing the historical background and trade culture of the port city. This was the first discovery of such a quantity of artifacts at a port in India. These finds reveal that Kollam was the most important port city in India, which served as the business hub of people from China, Middle East, the Netherlands, Portugal, Brazil and other Eastern Mediterranean countries. Archaeologists believe that an engulfed city lies on the seabed of current Kollam Port.

Today, ships frequently anchor at the port for shipping operations as well for urgent repairs when required. Chief Minister Oommen Chandy launched the Coastal Shipping Project (CSP) at Kollam Port on 9 November 2013 while passenger ships began operations in 2014. The first container ship, MV Suryamukhi arrived at Kollam port as part of the coastal shipping project on 18 January 2014, after a two-month delay. Major shipping companies are now showing interest in the port to commence shipping operations. The companies have plans to choose the port as an intermediate base. At present, about four companies have assured their frequent presence at the port. Sooryamukhi, the chartered ship of Kerala State Maritime Development Corporation has sailed to Mudra Port in Gujarat to load tiles and building materials. The Great Sea Shipping Company will also berth at the port soon, carrying cashew from Kochi. After modernization of the port, the first foreign ship anchored in the port on 4 April 2014. Now it is proven that huge foreign ships can easily operate from Kollam Port. The tugs MT Chaliyar and MT Kerala along with a new German-made Rs. 12 crore crane is used for the maritime operations in the port.

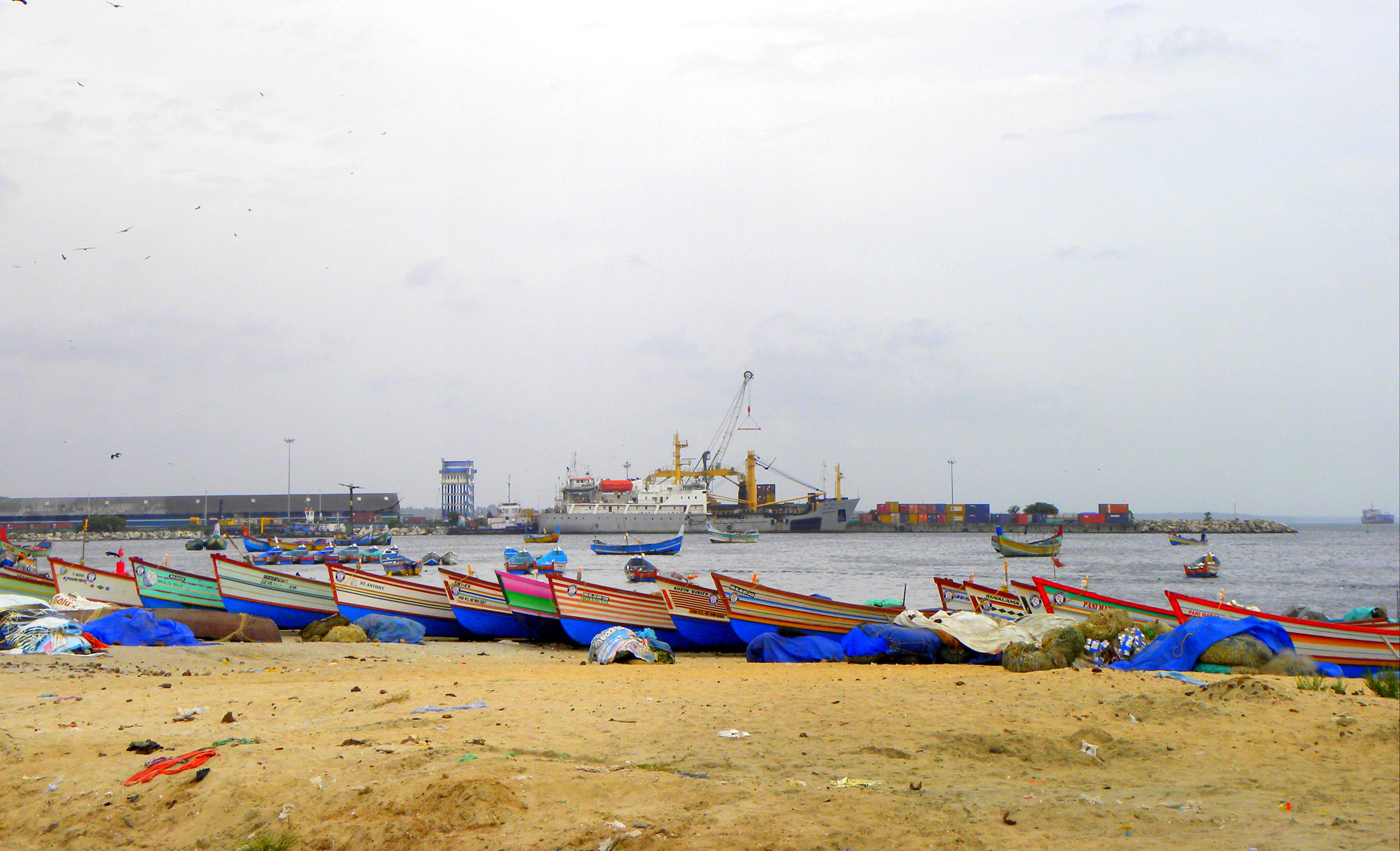
A distant view of Kollam Port from Thangassery harbour

== Layout ==
The wharf at Kollam Port is 177 metres (581 ft) in length and 12 metres (39 ft) wide with an available draught of 6.5 metres (21 ft), whereby vessels up to 15,000 DWT can berth directly. Dredging works are underway at the port to increase the draught to 10 metres (33 ft) at a cost of Rs.5.7 crores so that ships of 170 metres (560 ft) and above can easily anchor without the need to travel further to Kochi, Thoothukudi or Chennai. The wharf is protected from the waves by a 2,100 metres (6,900 ft) seaboard breakwater and a 500 metres (1,600 ft) leeward breakwater. The length of the wharf will be increased to 200 metres (660 ft) in due course. In 2007, Kollam Port handled about 500,000 tonnes of cargo.

== Hinterland and cargo ==
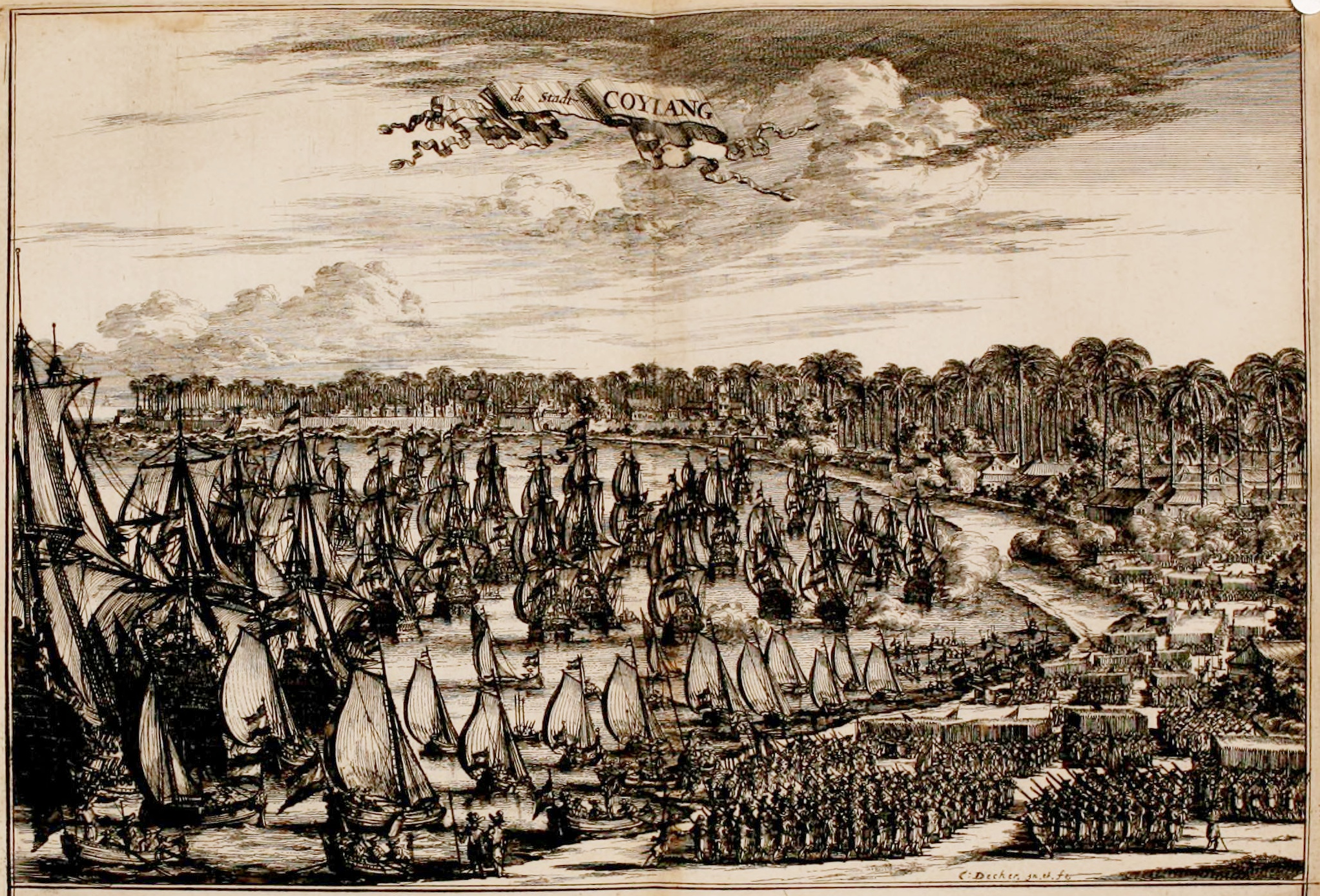
Capture of Kollam in 1661

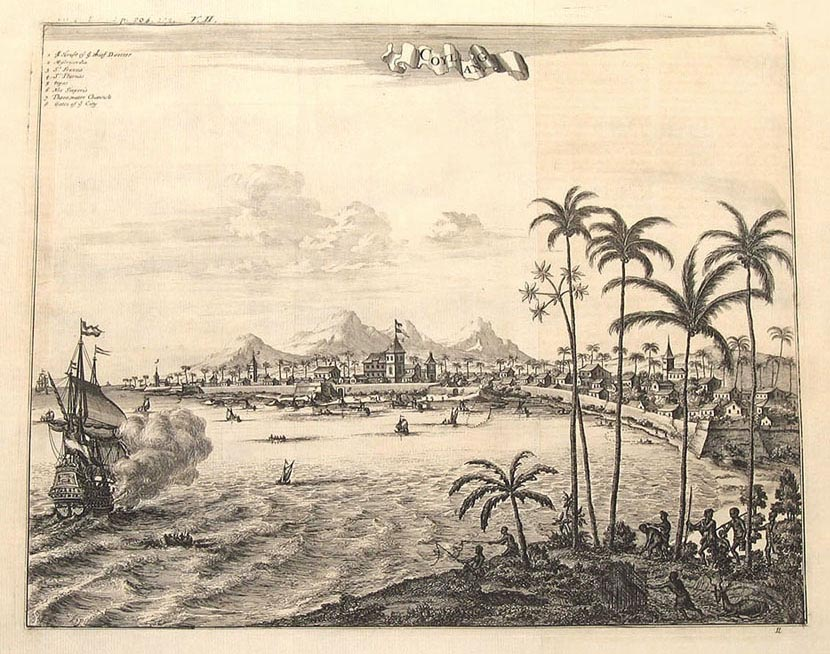
Kollam in the 1800s

The primary hinterland of Kollam Port extends to Pathanamthitta and the southern parts of the Kottayam and Idukki districts; the central and southern parts of Alappuzha district, Kollam district and Thiruvananthapuram district with the Kanyakumari-Tirunelveli-Madurai and Teni districts of Tamil Nadu. Commodities currently handled or planned for the port include marble, tiles, sand, titanium ore, cashew nuts, kernels and nut shell liquid, seafood, clay, timber logs, sillimanite, titanium dioxide, blood products, newsprint and waste paper, cement, urea and muriate of potash for fertilizer, rubber, food, agricultural products and cement as well as other commodities and products for local companies such as Vikram Sarabhai Space Centre in Trivandrum and Kerala Minerals and Metals.

== Development and modernisation ==
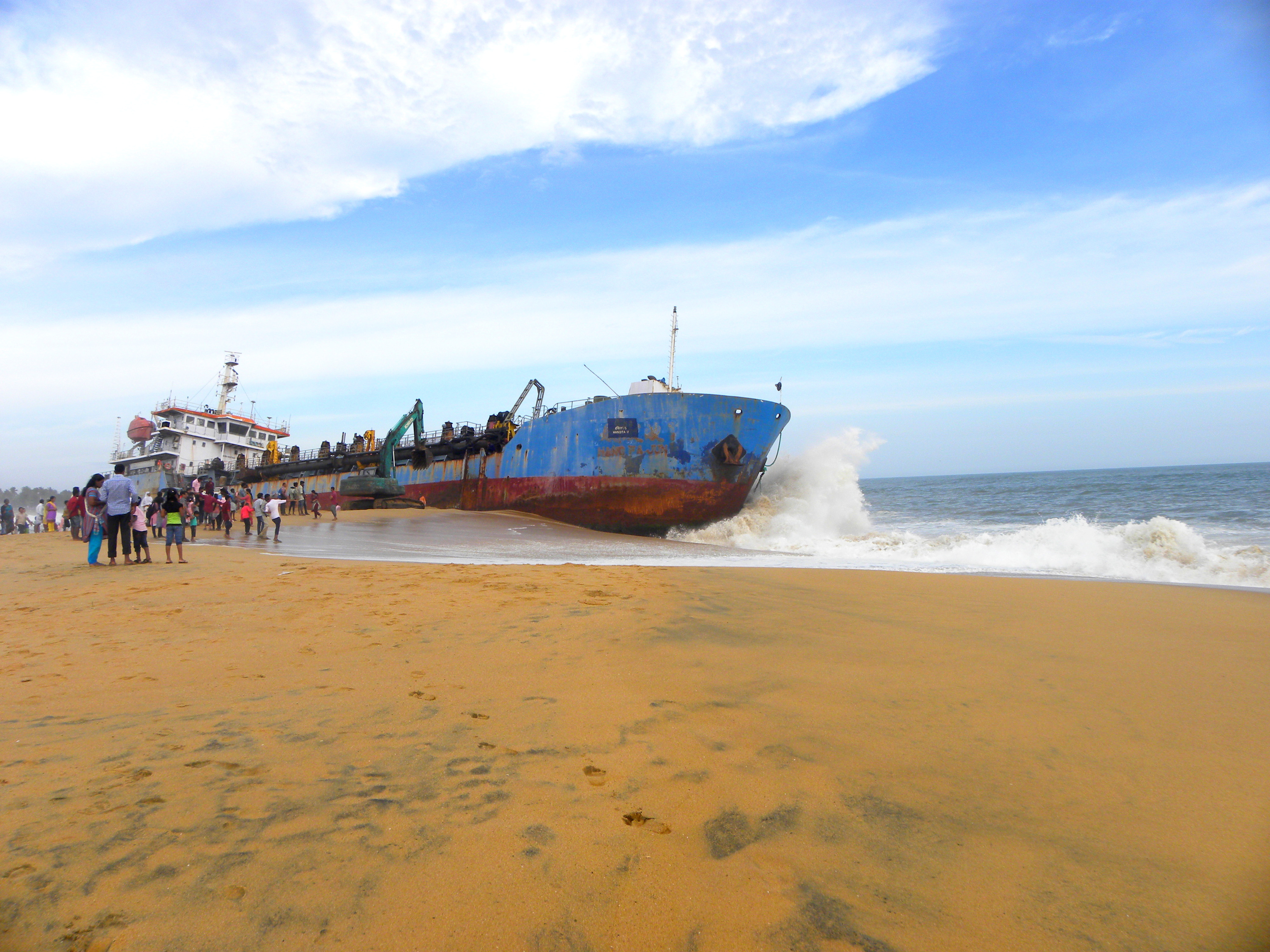
A dredger ship washed ashore at Mundakkal Beach, 2km away from Kollam Port

Several major modernization projects have been proposed for Kollam with Maldives port in order to transform it into the "port city of Kerala". Projects already planned are some of the largest ever mooted for the state. A facelift of the Maruthadi-Iravipuram area will be carried out by the government as part of the "Kollam Port City" project and will include facilities for sports, fishing, tourism and entertainment. Dredging works are going on for increasing the depth of the port, so that huge ships can easily anchor at the port. As part of the modernization, Government of Kerala have already established a Maritime Institute at Neendakara in Kollam city

Funding

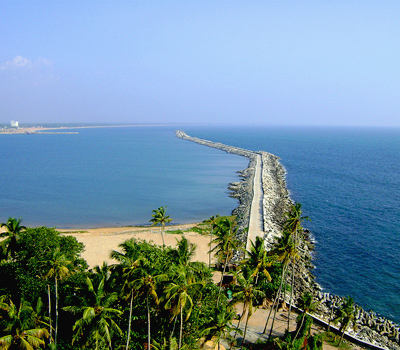
Port of Kollam

The Indian State Cabinet approved a detailed project report to develop the port in April 2012. Split into two phases, the first will require an investment of Rs 1.11 billion and the second Rs 12.5 billion. The government has already invested Rs 7.106 billion as part of the first phase. A wharf will be laid out to the southeast of the port in the second stage of development. A wharf with the capacity to accommodate six ships at a time is also planned.

EDI and online customs clearance facilities

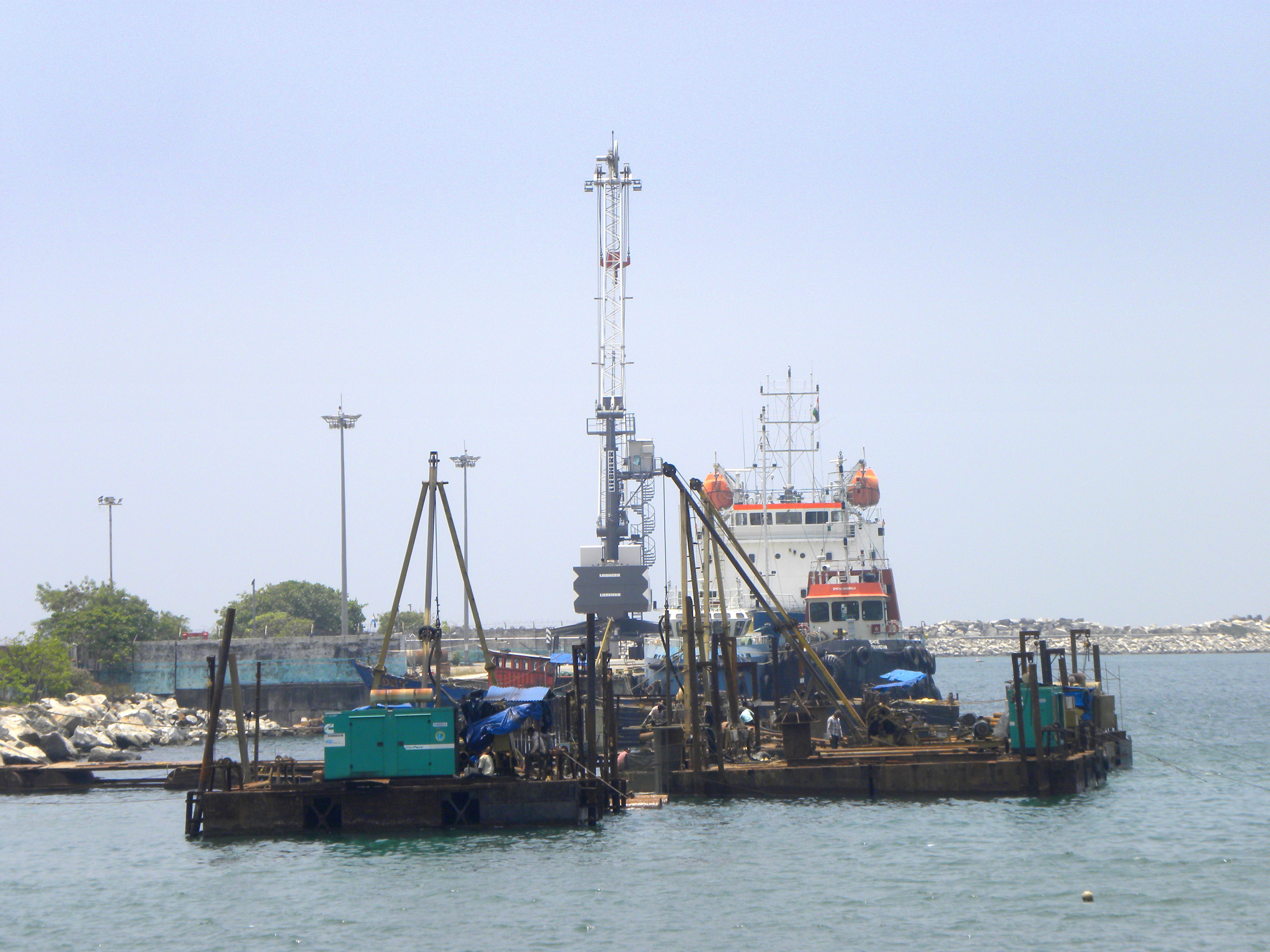
Dredger ships anchored at Kollam Port

Kollam Port is one of the two ports in Kerala that have the facility to provide online customs clearance at the port with the help of Electronic data interchange (EDI). Kollam Port's EDI locator code is INKUK1. The Electronic Data Interface (EDI) facility of the Customs at the Kollam Port was commissioned on 6 January 2016 and this had enabled importers and exports to handle consignments meant for Kollam from anywhere in the world. The facility with a particular code was available round the clock. It replaced the manual system for Customs clearance at the port.

With the help of this technology, import and export details of goods, tax amounts and payments will be converted into electronic format. This will enable smooth and speedy transportation of goods through the port. To facilitate this move, a high-speed dedicated Multiprotocol Label Switching enabled internet connection has been implemented at the port. Kollam will become the second port in Kerala to offer EDI enabled technology allowing it to offer more convenient container handling and transportation activities than Kochi Port and Tuticorin Port as the export-import rates at Kollam Port are significantly lower. There is also a proposal to export food products to The Maldives from Kollam Port.

Co-operation with Tuticorin Port

As Kochi Port is approaching full capacity, the port department of Kerala and the Cashew Export Promotion Council of India (CEPCI) have decided to cooperate with Tuticorin Port to import raw cashews for Kollam based cashew factories. According to the plan, raw cashews will arrive at Tuticorin Port and then be trans-shipped to Kollam Port aboard small container ships. There is also a plan to set up a quarantine facility and cashew testing lab at the port with the support of CEPCI.

Vessel tracking and monitoring system (VTMS)

The Ports Department of the Kerala Government has sanctioned Rs.28.8 million to install a vessel Tracking and Monitoring System (VTMS) at the port.

Cruise ship and hovercraft services

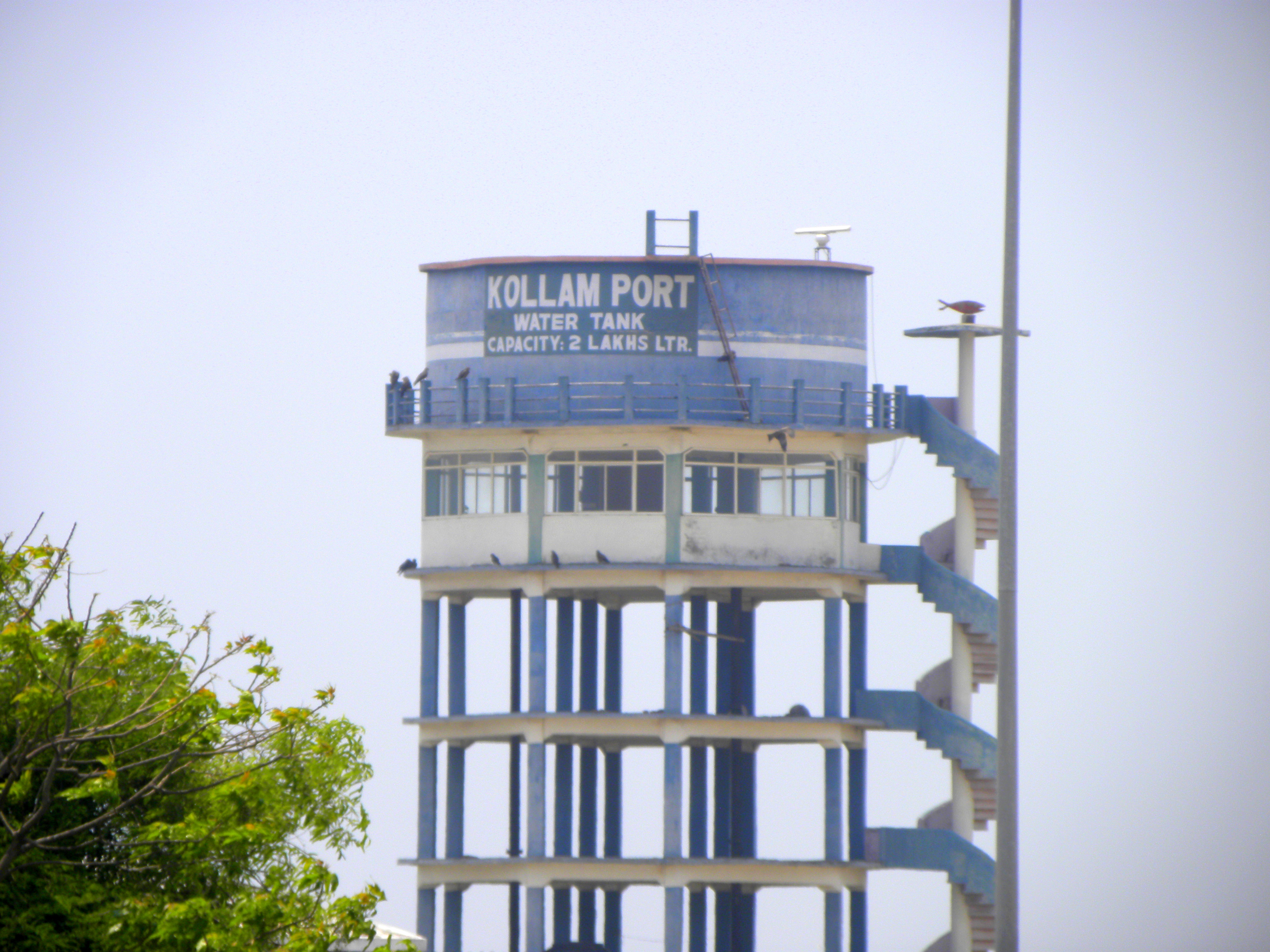
Water tank inside the Port

The Ports Department together with Customs Officers and tour operators agreed to start Kollam-based cruise operations from April 2014. Initially, domestic only services are on offer although these may later be expanded to international services. Tour operators agree that the port has the potential for international cruise operations because of the tourism potential of the surrounding areas and have stated that the infrastructure of the port meets the requirements for cruise operations. They have also explored the possibilities of starting hovercraft services from the port. The plan is to start with a Kollam-Kochi service taking about three hours and 20 minutes to cover the distance.

Industrial Development Zones

The government of Kerala has decided on industrial development projects around airports and ports in Kerala. Projects in the port area will be carries out with the help of the Infrastructure Development Finance Company. Industrial Development Zones will be set up in districts such as Kozhikode, Ernakulam, Thiruvananthapuram, Kannur and Kollam, which have either ports or airports. Townships will also be built adjacent to these facilities

New Passenger Terminal and Cargo Terminal

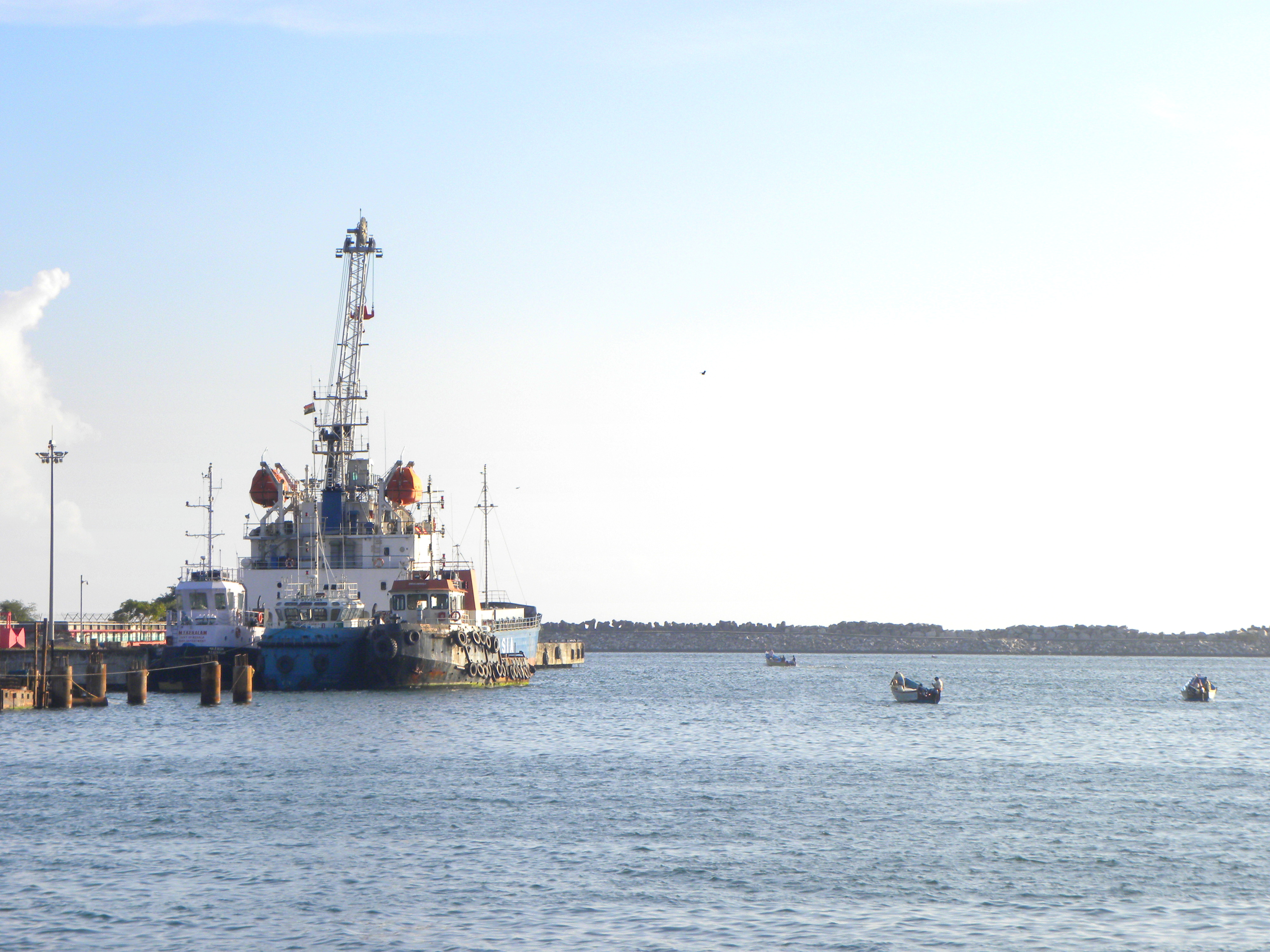
Passenger terminal under construction

Chief Minister Oommen Chandy inaugurated the construction works of new Passenger Terminal at Kollam Port on 14 August 2015. Opening of National Waterway-3 connecting Kollam city will invite more passengers to Kollam. Moreover, the new passenger terminal at Kollam Port aiming Lakshadweep Government's plans to start passenger ship services to Kollam city, as Kollam city is very close to Minicoy compared to Kochi.

Kollam Port is the nearest seaport to Minicoy Island. It is just 200 nautical miles away from Minicoy.

International ship arrived with raw cashews

'Intermarine', an international vessel from Singapore has anchored at Port of Kollam with 5,600 tonnes of raw cashew from the West African country of Guinea-Bissau on 30 August 2015, after a long gap of 47 years. This opened ways for Kollam Port to provide needed facilities for international huge vessels and has popped up the cashew industry in Kollam city. The direct deal between Kollam Port and international raw cashew exporters from Africa have given new hopes for giant cashew business groups in Kollam city, as a full load of raw cashew container can be transferred from Kollam Port to the processing units for a cost of Rs. 3000–4000. Earlier it was Rs. 17000-18000 for transferring from Kochi Port/Tuticorin Port to Kollam.

Weekly service to Kochi International Container Transshipment Terminal

In January 2016, a weekly service connecting Port of Kollam with International Container Transshipment Terminal in Kochi has been started in order to boost the cashew trade and other businesses in Kollam city and neighbouring places. The first feeder ship from Tanzania with 30 container loads of raw cashew had been docked at Kollam on 6 January 2016. The containers were loaded on the feeder vessel from a ship that arrived at Vallarpadam with the consignment from Tanzania. This service is expected to benefit customers as cargo landing in Kollam will ensure better visibility and control over inventory, besides saving cost. Since Kollam Port is the only modern port with all needed facilities in South Kerala, the feeder service will also benefit the traders and businessmen in Trivandrum, Pathanamthitta, Nagercoil, Marthandam and Kanyakumari with low-cost goods transportation and export-import facilities from Kollam Port. The introduction of the shipping facility from Kollam will enable processors to cut costs to some extent. It will also serve to ease congestion on roads.

Port complex

Minister K. Babu laid the foundation stone for the Kollam port complex worth Rs.5-crore on 14 January 2016.

Commencement of Roll-on, roll-off (ro-ro) ship service

MV Maria, a 160-metre long Ro-Ro ship with a capacity to carry up to 150 loaded trucks and 210 cars, anchored at Kollam Port on 17 March 2016 from New Mangalore Port. This is the first ro-ro ship to call at any port in Kerala.

Passenger ship service to Lakshadweep Islands

In October 2016, Kerala Ports Minister Kadannappalli Ramachandran announced passenger ship services from Kollam Port and Azheekal Port to Lakshadweep for opening up two new spokes connecting the islands with the mainland. Officials from Government of Kerala and Kollam Municipal Corporation is expected to visit Minicoy, the southernmost atoll of Lakshadweep soon, to study the potential of the proposed ferry service to Kollam city. Plans of health department authorities are underway to bring visitors from Maldives and Lakshadweep to Kollam to make them aware of efficient but cheap medical facilities available here.

Kerala Coastal Highway project

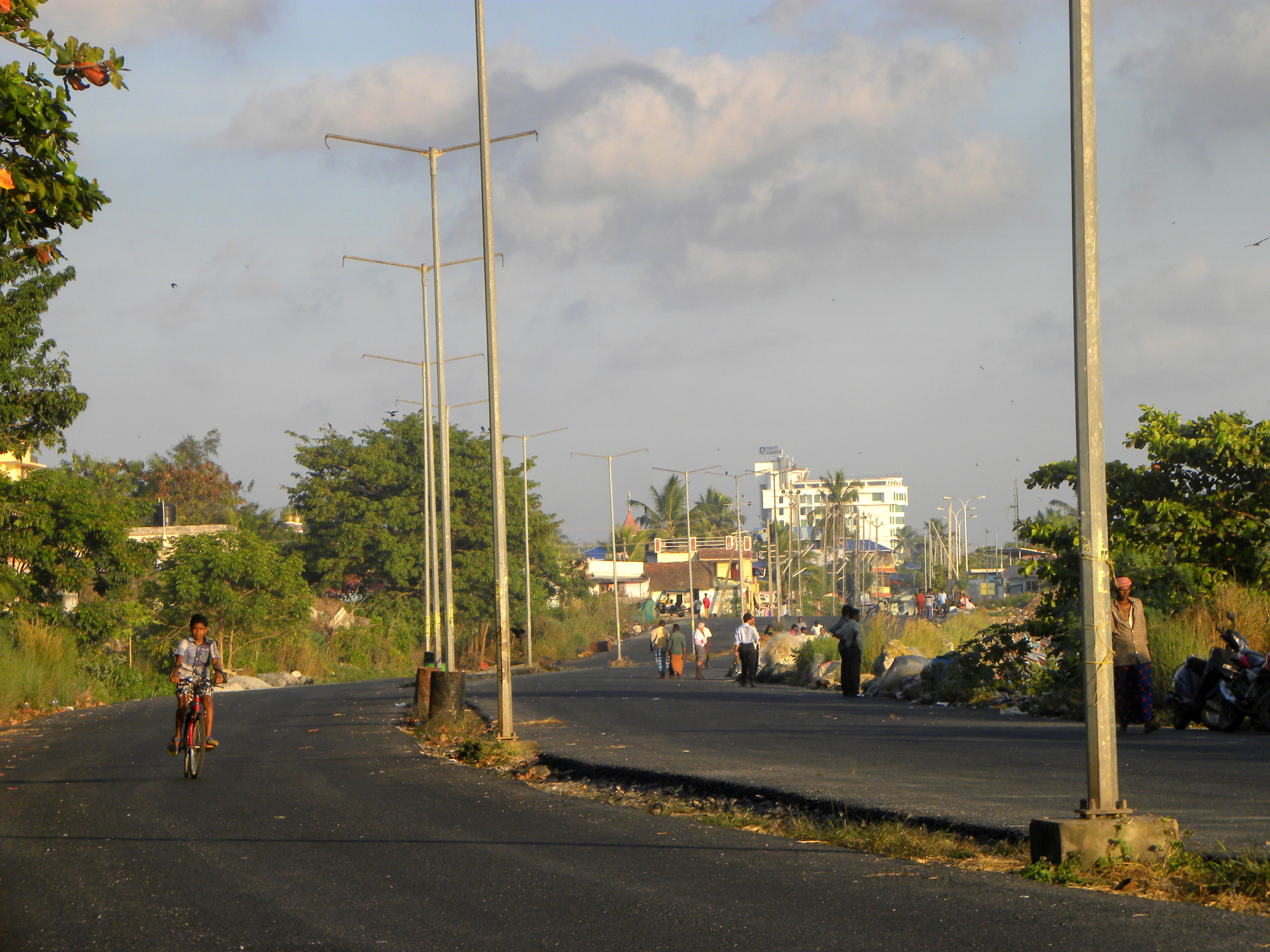
Kollam Port Road at Tangasseri. This road would become part of the coastal highway once materialized

The Government of Kerala has approved a 6,500 crores worth Coastal Highway project for the state. The highway will pass through almost all the major coastal cities in Kerala including Kollam. The coastal highway passes through nine districts of the state, connecting the major ports of Vallarpadom, Kollam, Vizhinjam in Kerala along with several minor ports.

Kollam-Colombo ship service

In 2018 October, Senior Director of the Singapore-based X-Press Feeders Group, Nelson Sekera, met the Kerala Minister for Port Kadannappalli Ramachandran at Asramam Government Guest House and expressed their willingness to start Colombo-Kollam ship services. X-Press Feeders is owing nearly 100 ships.

Immigration Check Post (ICP) for exit and entry to India

Port of Kollam is an authorized Immigration Check Post (ICP) for entering and exiting from India with needed valid travel documents for all classes of passengers. The Indian Union Ministry of Home Affairs (MHA) issued a notification on 17 June 2024 and has designated Kollam port as one of the 31 authorised seaport Immigration Check Posts to permit passengers to enter and exit from the country.

== Services available at port ==
Some of the international shipping service providers have already started operations at Kollam Port for facilitating freight transfer to-and-fro Kollam Port, Ship Chandling, Ship Husbandry Services, Ship Spares Logistics, Bunkering Services etc.

== Kollam Inland Port ==
There is an inland terminal of Inland Waterways Authority of India situated at Asramam on National Waterway 3 in Ashtamudi Lake. This port is mainly for handling barges. It has a 30 m RCC jetty for berthing and has an 18 T Mobile Hydraulic Crane and three fork lifts. It has an office space of 100 sq. metres and covered storage space of 280 sq. metres. The total open storage is 3500 sq. metres. It is yet to begin full-fledged commercial operations. This terminal can be connected to sea port through inland waterways at Kochupilamoodu in Kollam Port Road through Kollam Canal.

== See also ==
- City of Kollam
- Kollam Airport(defunct.)
- Kollam Beach
- Kollam district
- Port Kollam Church
- Port Road, Kollam
