= Ezhukone =

Ezhukone Village
- Village
- Location in Kerala, India Ezhukone Village (India)
- Coordinates: 8°58′0″N 76°43′0″E
- Country: India
- State: Kerala
- District: Kollam

Population (2011)
  - Total: 23,744

Languages
  - Official: Malayalam, English Postal code =691505
- Time zone: UTC+5:30 (IST)
- Postal code: 691505
- Vehicle registration: KL-
- Nearest city: Kollam City (19 km)

Ezhukone is a village in Kollam district in the state of Kerala, India between Kottarakara and Kundara.

== Transportation ==
- Ezhukone railway station on Kollam–Sengottai branch line is very close to the village.
- Ezhukone is situated along Kollam - Thirumangalam National Highway 744 (India) and is well connected with Kollam, Kottarakkara, Punalur etc. by KSRTC (Kerala State Road Transport Corporation) buses
- Nearest airport is Trivandrum International Airport
- The village has a good and well maintained road transport system, with a large number of autorikshaws and KSRTC (Kerala State Road Transport Corporation) buses.

== Important institutions, shops and areas ==
- Govt Polytechnic Ezhukone
- VHSS Ezhukone
- Irumpanangadu School
- ESIC Hospital Ezhukone
- Govt.Technical Vocational Higher Secondary School
- Sree Sree Academy, ezhukone
- Sree Narayana Guru Central School, Ezhukone
- MAC Trading Co, ezhukone
- Mac Metals, Ezhukone
- Ezhukone Madankavu Temple, Ezukone
- Santi clinic, Ezukone
- Koyikal temple, Ezhukone
  - Edakkidom ** Thettikunnil Maha Devi Temple, Near Ezhukone Edakkidom

== Demographics ==
As of 2011 India census, Ezhukone had a population of 23744 with 11,168 males and 12,576 females.
