= Kochupilamoodu =

Kochupilamoodu Kochupilammoodu
- Neighbourhood
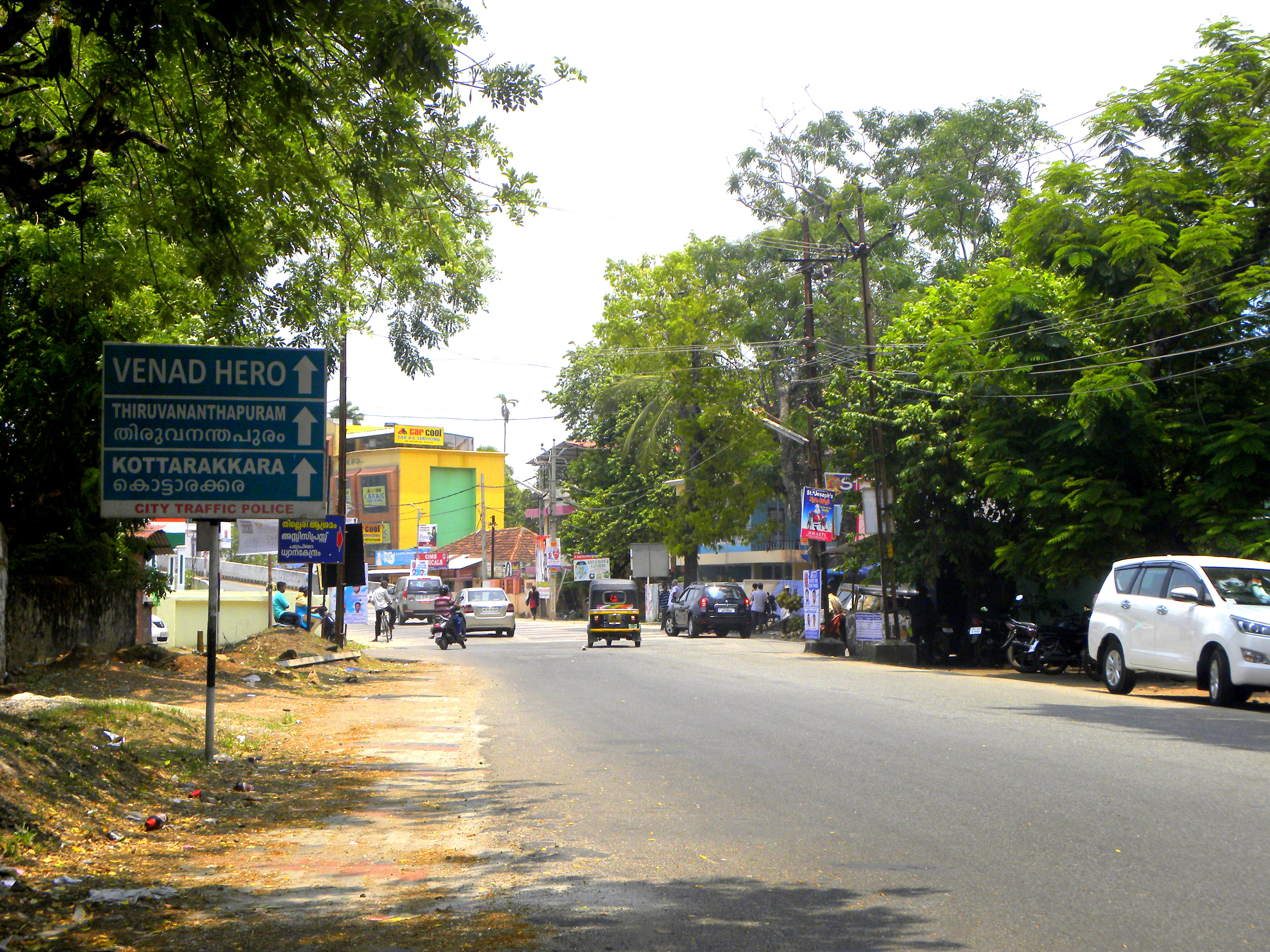
- Kochupilamoodu

- Location in Kollam, India Kochupilamoodu (Kerala) Kochupilamoodu (India)
- Coordinates: 8.876889°N 76.592832°E
- Country: India
- State: Kerala
- City: Kollam
- Time zone: UTC+5.30 (IST)
- Postal code: 691001
- Area code: 0474
- Lok Sabha constituency: Kollam
- Civic agency: Kollam Municipal Corporation
- Avg. summer temperature: 34 °C (93 °F)
- Avg. winter temperature: 22 °C (72 °F)
- Website: http://www.kollam.nic.in

Kochupilamoodu or Kochupilammoodu is an important neighbourhood and cashew hub in Kollam city, Kerala, India. It is one of the prominent business centres in the city. Kochupilamoodu is very close to Downtown Kollam area and is about 1 km away from Chinnakada. It is on the way to Kollam Port from the city CBD of Kollam

== Importance ==
Kochupilamoodu is one among the cashew hubs in Kollam city - Cashew Capital of the World. So many cashew companies are located at this place. This place is situated in between Mundakkal, Kollam Port, Kollam Beach and Chinnakada. This location is also giving importance to this place. Kollam Canal - Part of Shornur-Thiruvananthapuram canal system in Kerala, is passing through Kochupilamoodu. Kochupilamoodu bridge is connecting Chinnakada with Kollam Beach. City Corporation of Kollam has proposed a new bus stand at Kochupilamoodu during the budget of 2005.

== See also ==
- Kollam
- Chinnakada
- Kollam Beach
- Mundakkal
