= Nallila =

- Village
- Location in Kerala, India Nallila (India)
- Coordinates: 8°55′35″N 76°42′20″E
- Country: India
- State: Kerala
- District: Kollam

Government
  - Type: Democratic
  - Body: Panjayath

Population
  - Total: more than 5,000

Languages
  - Official: Malayalam, English
- Time zone: UTC+5:30 (IST)
- PIN: 691515
- Telephone code: 0474256
- Vehicle registration: KL-02
- Nearest city: Kundara, Kannanalloor
- Literacy: 100%
- Lok Sabha constituency: Kundara
- Climate: Normal (Köppen)

Nallila is a small village in Kollam district of Kerala, India. This place is known for its famous churches such as St. Mary’s Malankara catholic church, St. Gabriel Orthodox Valiyapally, Bethel Pilgrim Churich, and Nallila Jacobite Syrian (Orthodox) church.

Native plants include natural rubber, banana, jackfruit, black pepper, guava, and Syzygium samarangense.

Key aspects of the local economy are rubber harvesting, banking, and remittances from migrant workers. Cashews had been a major source of village income, until the 2020 Covid export crisis, resulting in bankruptcy and suicide of a key local business owner.
