= Pavithreswaram =

- village
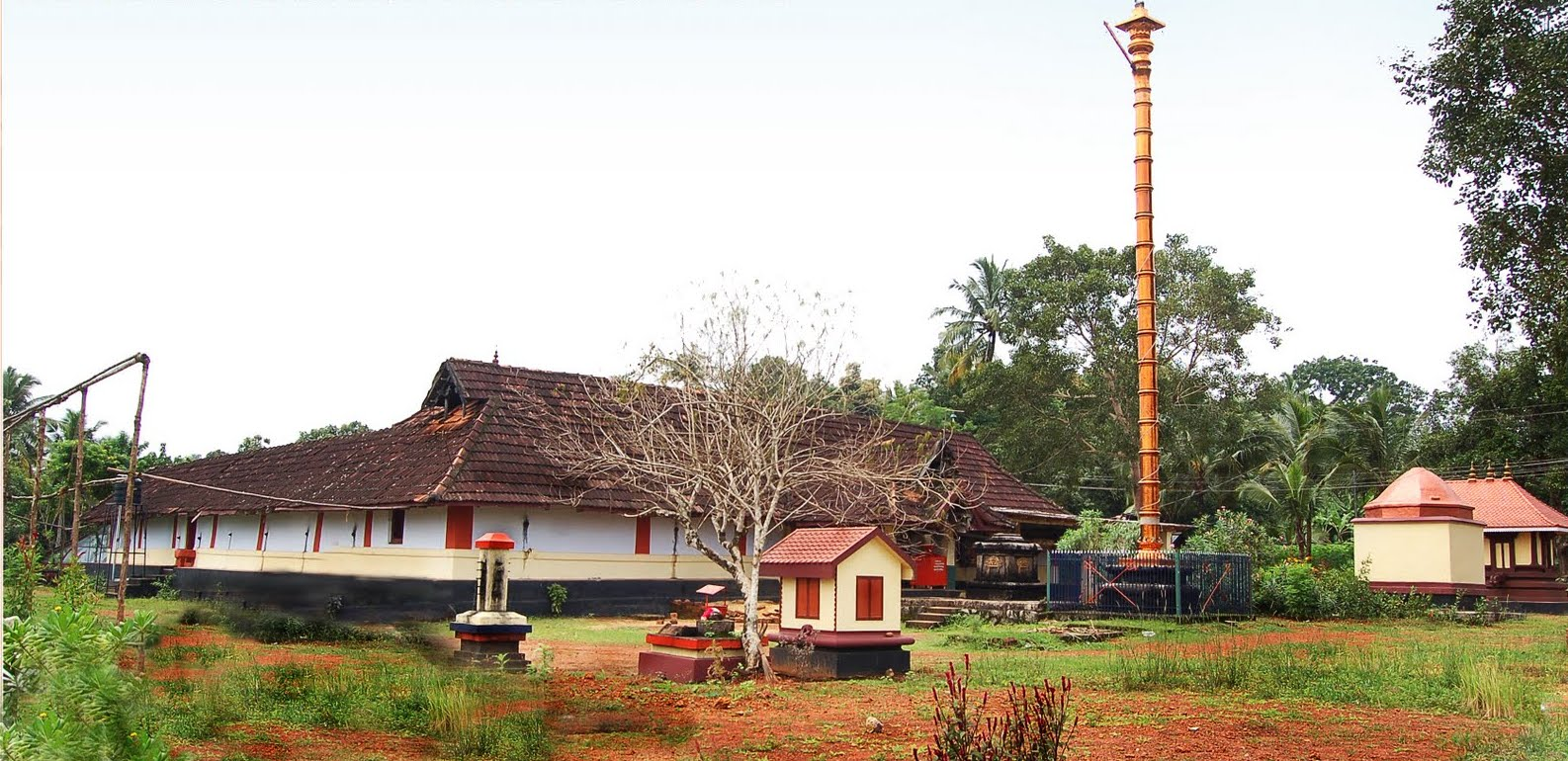
- Pavithreswaram Sree Mahadeva Temple
- Interactive map of Pavithreswaram
- Coordinates: 9°0′0″N 76°42′0″E
- Country: India
- State: Kerala
- District: Kollam

Population (2011)
  - Total: 26,041

Languages
  - Official: Malayalam, English
- Time zone: UTC+5:30 (IST)
- PIN: 691507
- Telephone code: 91474
- Vehicle registration: KL
- Nearest city: Kollam
- Lok Sabha constituency: Mavelikkara
- Vidhan Sabha constituency: kunnathoor
- Climate: Tropical wet (Köppen)
- Website: Pavithreswaram Panchayat

Pavithreswaram is a village in Kottarakkara taluk of Kollam district in the state of Kerala, India.

== Demographics ==
As of 2011 India census, Pavithreswaram had a population of 26,041: 12,282 males and 13,759 females.

== Schools ==
- K.N.N.M.H.S.S&V.H.S.S
- VHSS Kuzhikkalidavaka
- Kuzhikkal Edavaka VHS School
- K.N.N.M.T.T.I
- N.S.S LPS Edavattom, Karuvelil PO
- K.S.M.V.H.S.S.Edavattom, Karuvelil PO

== Hospitals ==
- Government Homoeo Dispensary

== Temples ==
- Sree Mahadevar Temple
- Mayam kottu Malanada Temple
- Kulakkara Sree Mahavishnu Temple, Edavattom, Karuvelil Po
- Mannathu Muhoorthi Temple, Edavattom
- Maranadu Mullavelil Mahavishnu Temple
- Kaithacodu Endelayappan Temple
- Karalil Devi temple
- Malanada Appooppan Temple
- Alassery Sree Bhadra Devi Temple, Alasseril Junction, Pavithreswaram
- Bhajanamadam Sreekrishna Swami Temple
- Udayankavu Siva Temple, Poreeckal, Edavattom, Karuvelil PO
- Kaithacodu Sree Durga Bhadra Devi Temple Kaithacode
- Kaithacodu Varoor Sree Bhadra Moorthy Temple

== Churches ==
- St. Thevodorose Orthodox Syrian Church, Madhavassery, Pavithreswaram (p.o), Puthoor

== Cashew factories ==
- Bismilla Cashew Company
- Galaxy Cashew Factory
- Kauvery Cashew Factory
- KSCDC No.18
- Mahavishnu Cashew Factory
- Prakash Cashew Factory
- Pranavam Cashew company
- Raja Cashew Company
- St: George Cashew Company

== Quarries ==
- Granite
- Brick/Tile clay
