= Puthoor =

- Village
- Location in Kerala, India
- Coordinates: 9.04°N 76.71°E
- Country: India
- State: Kerala
- District: Kollam
- Talukas: Kottarakkara

Government
  - Body: Grama Panchayat

Area
  - Total: 13.76 km^{2} (5.31 sq mi)

Population (2011)
  - Total: 19,786
  - Density: 1,438/km^{2} (3,724/sq mi)

Languages
  - Official: Malayalam, English
- Time zone: UTC+5:30 (IST)
- PIN: 691507
- Telephone code: + 91 - 474
- Vehicle registration: KL-24 (Kottarakkara RTO)

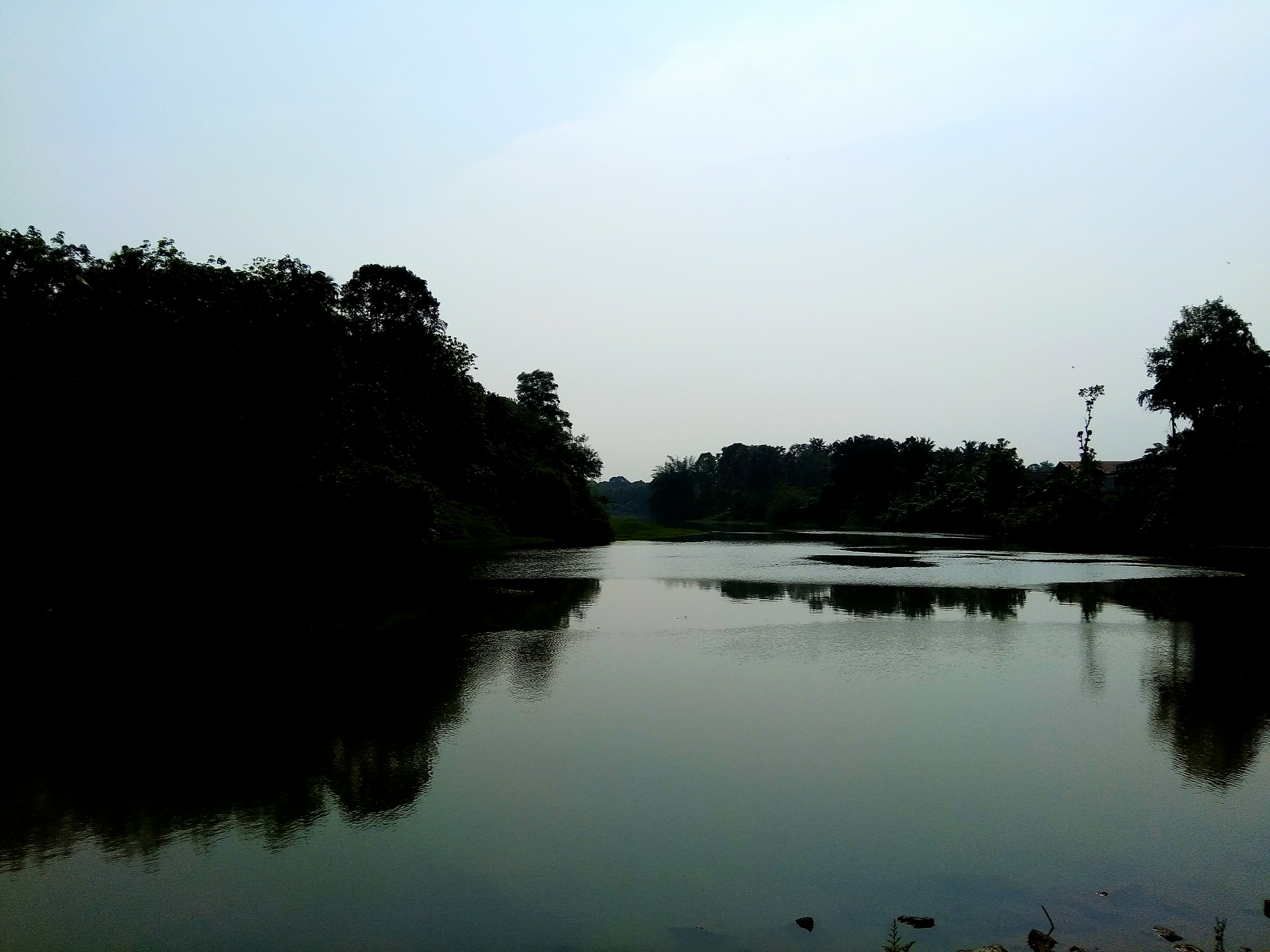
Kallada River which is the nearest river to Puthur Town

Puthoor is a suburban of Kottarakara located 7 kilometers (4.3 mi) from Kottarakkara in Kollam District, Kerala, India.

== Politics ==
Politically it was a Congress Party stronghold, and there were occasions when Communist groups won elections as well.

== Etymology ==
The name Puthur is derived from Puthu (new) and Ur (place) which means the 'new village'. There are several villages across Kerala, Karnataka and Tamil Nadu which are named Puthur and its alternative forms like Pudur, Puthur, Puttur, Puthur etc.

== Geography ==
The closest major geographical feature is the Kallada river, which is considered one of the 44 major rivers of Kerala. The river is facing problems due to sand mining. The brick industries used to extract the wetland soil for brick making which has converted the paddy fields into deep waterbodies. The filling of paddy fields and wetlands by soil and converting them into real estate is affecting the ecology of the region.

== Economy ==
As Kollam is known for cashew industries, Puthur as a small town 28 km away from Kollam port is also influenced by this industry from the last seven to eight decades. Though history of this town goes beyond 500 years, cashew and brick industries constitutes the major Industries of the town. Puthur has a good number of cashew factories which processes cashew nut and exporting to foreign countries. Women contributes the major chunk of the labour force of the Cashew factories. Puthur also has many brick factories mainly located in Cherupoika. The brick factories employ a large number of male workers including migrant labourers. Now it is also famous for buying cycles.

Paddy, tuber crops and coconut, has given way to monocultivation of natural rubber, making it perhaps the most visible feature of the flora of the village. The steep decline in the price of natural rubber is bound to have strong repercussions to the economy of the village

== Demographics ==
The permanent residents of Puthur were entirely Malayalam speaking natives. The Nairs caste is dominant in this place and has a significant Syrian Christian population. The recent trend of in migration of labour from other Indian states like West Bengal, Orissa and Bihar have resulted in the presence of the speakers of other languages in the city.

There are tourist attractions in Puthur such as the old shrines including Ullirippil Kavu, Kaniyapoyka Temple, the Mylamkulam Rock, Thazhum, Njankadavu, vetturuthil sree nagaraja devi temple and Attuvassey.

== See also ==
- Kaithacodu
