= Kilikollur =

Killikolloor
- Zone & Neighbourhood
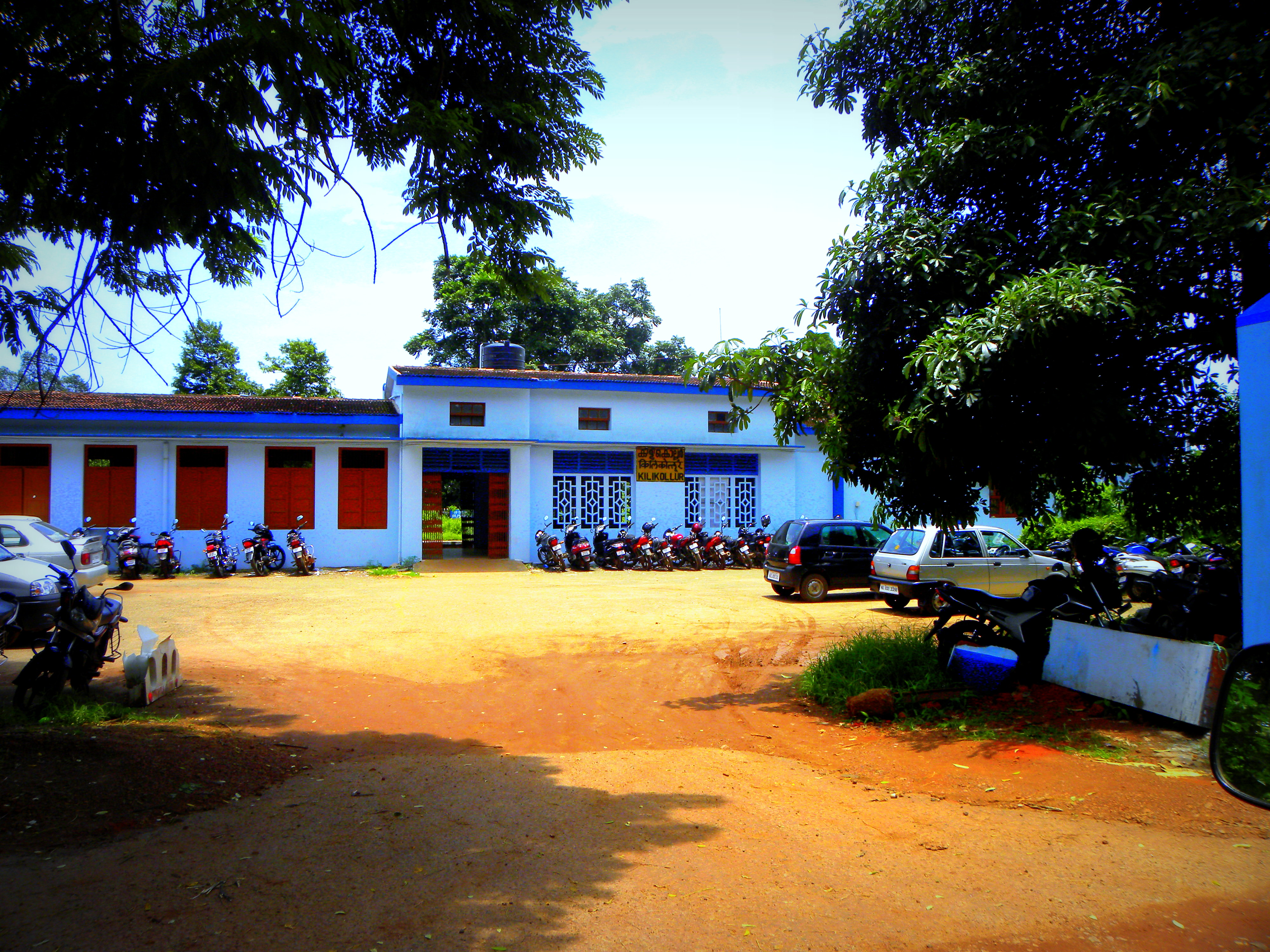
- Kilikollur railway station entrance

- Location in Kollam, India Killikolloor (Kerala)
- Coordinates: 8°55′2.76″N 76°37′59.08″E
- Country: India
- State: Kerala
- District: Kollam
- Municipal Corporation: Kollam

Government
  - Type: Councillor
  - Mayor: A.K Hafeez (INC)
  - Deputy Mayor: Dr. Udaya Sukumaran
  - District collector: Devidas. N, IAS

Area
  - Total: 11.24 km^{2} (4.34 sq mi)

Languages
  - Official: Malayalam
- Time zone: UTC+5:30 (IST)
- PIN: 691 004
- Telephone code: 0474
- Vehicle registration: KL-02
- Website: www.kollam.nic.in

Kilikolloor, also known as Kilikollur, is a neighbourhood in Kollam district in Kerala, India. It is a center of the cashew industry in the area, and is also a hub of automobile production.

National Highway 744 passes through Killikolloor. It is served by Kilikollur railway station, a stop for trains to and from Kollam, Paravur, Punalur, Thiruvananthapuram, Kanyakumari, Ernakulam, and Guruvayur.

Thangal Kunju Musaliar College of Engineering is located in Kilikollur. A zonal office of Kollam Municipal Corporation is also located in the neighbourhood.

== Merging of Kilikollur with Kollam City Corporation ==
Kilikollur was a panchayath and was formed in 1953. It was included in Anchalumoodu block of Kollam district with an area of 11.24 km^{2}. Kollam has been a commercial center in India since at least 851 AD. When Kollam Municipality was upgraded to a city corporation in the year 2000, it was merged with Killikollur.

== Location ==
- Kollam Junction railway station - 5.5 km
- Andamukkam City Bus Stand - 6 km
- Kollam KSRTC Bus Station - 6.5 km
- Kollam Port - 8 km
- Chinnakada - 5.5 km
- Thangassery - 8.2 km

== See also ==
- Kollam Junction railway station 3 km
- Andamukkam City Bus Stand4KM
- Kadappakada2KM
- Chinnakada3KM
