= Economy of Kollam =

Economy of a region in Kerala, India

Kollam or Quilon is an old seaport and a city on the Laccadive Sea coast in Kerala, India, on Ashtamudi Lake. The city remains notable as the ancient commercial capital of Kerala and the southwestern Indian coast, in addition to its fame as the "Cashew Capital of the World". The Kollam Municipal Corporation has the second largest budget in Kerala in terms of revenue and expenditure.

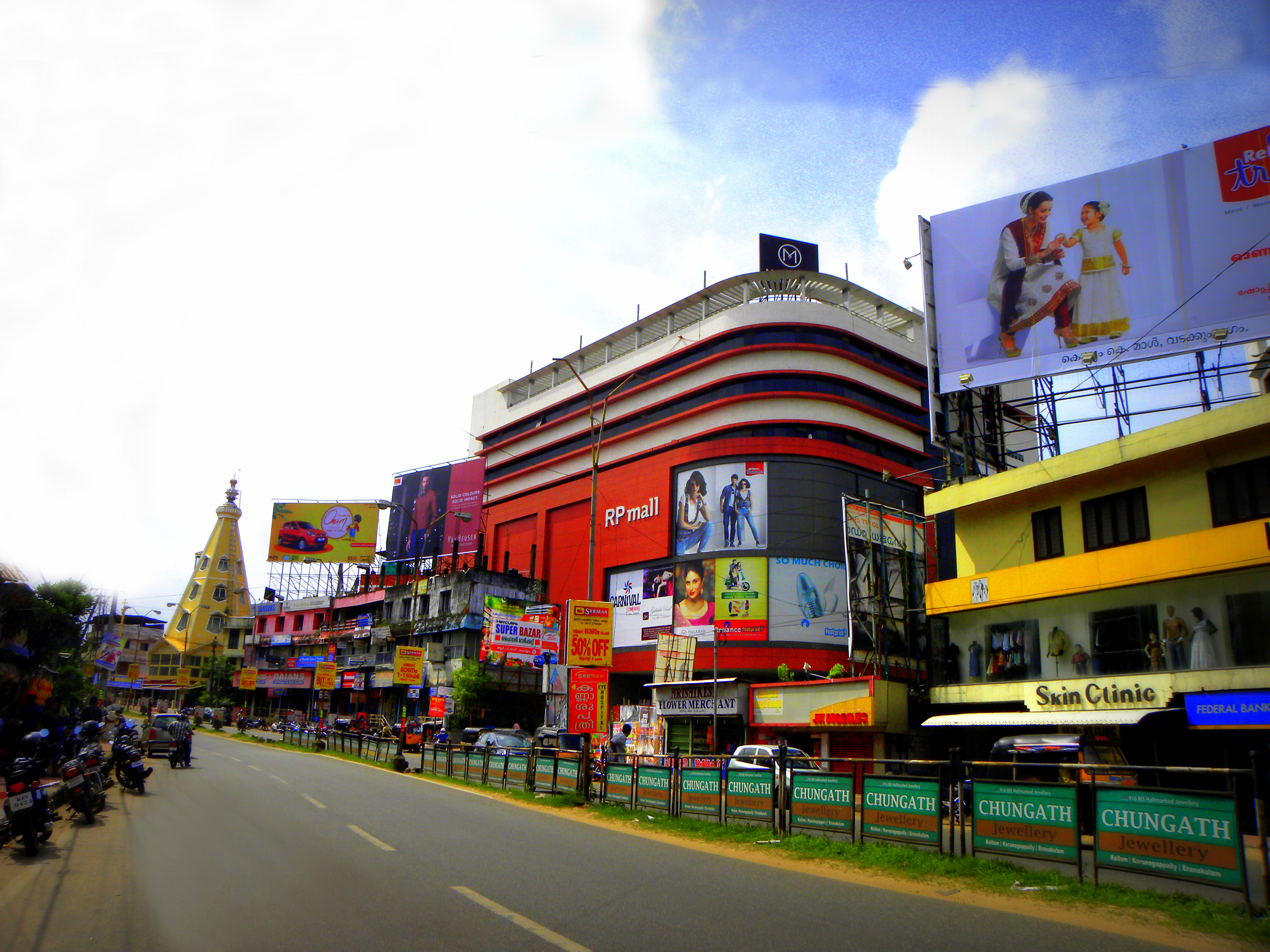
Street view of Downtown Kollam, the largest commercial center in the city of Kollam

== Overview ==
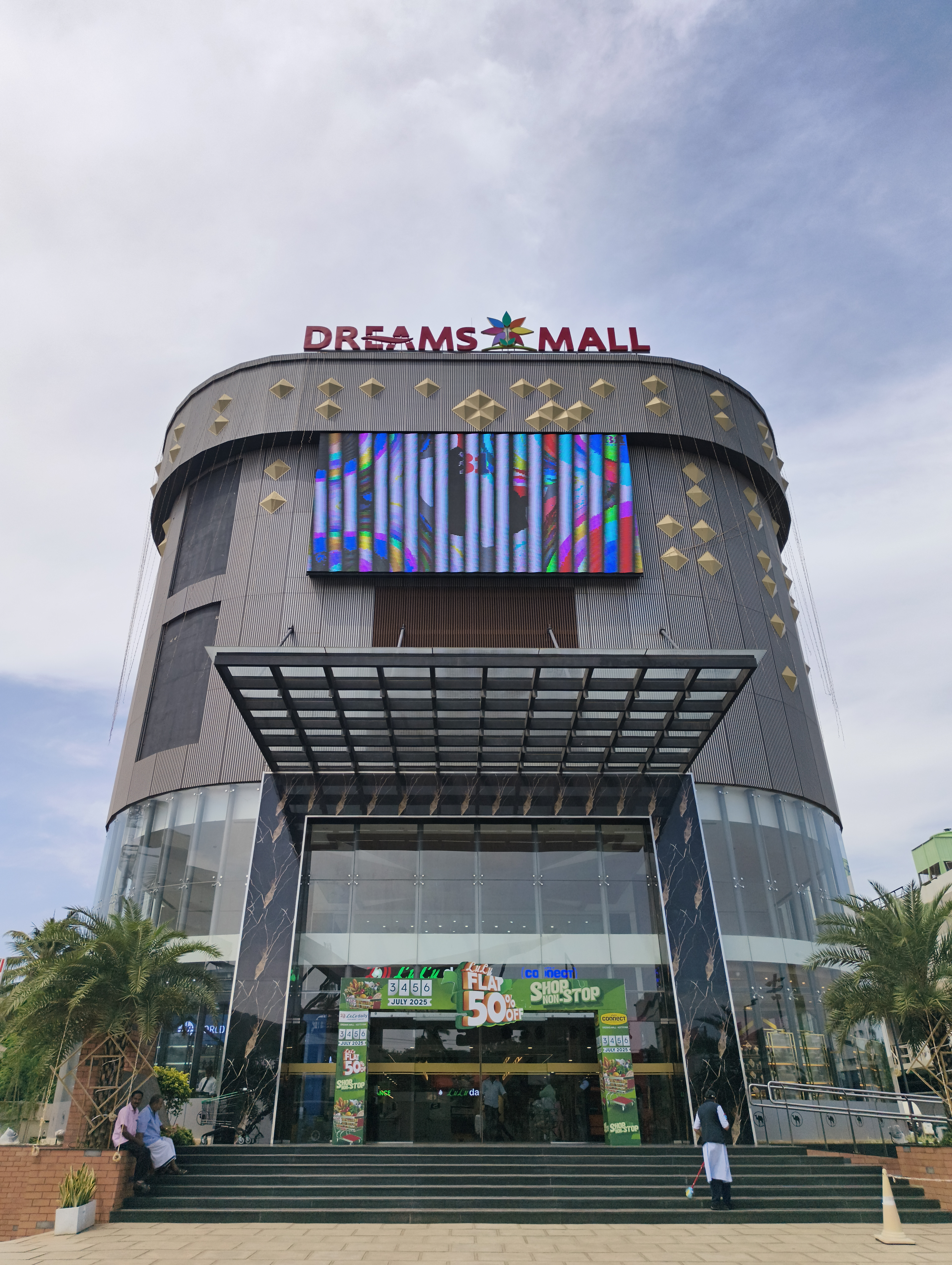
Dreams Mall (Lulu Hyper Market), Kottiyam in Kollam District

The Kollam sea port was founded by Mar Abo in 825 AD, sanctioned via the Tamil king of Venad (otherwise called the Ay kingdom), Udayamarthandavarma. The trade and business culture of Quilon is as old as Kollam Port. Kollam was the most famous port city in India, serving as a business hub for merchants from China, Middle East, Dutch, Portugal, Brazil and other Eastern Mediterranean countries. The recent discovery of treasures and remnants at the Kollam Port area substantiates claims concerning ancient trade activities related to the old Quilon city; archaeologists believe that there is an engulfed city in the seabed of the current Kollam Port.

Since the 1950s, local businessmen are active in the business of the city; key players, like the TKM Group, started their first business center and potentially the first mall at the heart of Kollam in 1950, at Chinnakada. This enterprise included several shops and the Grand and Prince Theatres. Their first bakery, "Supreme", started in 1984 at Chinnakada, now a prominent group across Kollam, Kochi, and Thiruvananthapuram. Kollam is a moderately industrialized city, with several of the major employers in the public sector remaining Indian Rare Earths Limited (IRE), Kerala Metals and Minerals Limited, United Electrical Industries Limited or UNILEC (popularly known as the Meter Company), the Kerala Primo Pipe Factory, Parvathy Mills Limited, ALIND Kundara and Kerala Ceramics.

The industrial estates within the city include:

- The Industrial Estate at Mundakkal and
- The SIDCO Industrial Estate at Umayanalloor/

== Economy ==
Organizations/Councils based in the city
No.	Council/Organization
1	Cashew Export Promotion Council of India
2	Kerala Minerals and Metals Limited(KMML)
3	Kollam Port
4	Kerala State Cashew Development Corporation Limited
5	United Electrical Industries Limited

Kollam is a relatively industrialized city, and the Kollam Municipal Corporation is the second-largest revenue-earning city corporation in Kerala, second to Kochi. The meeting of three National Highways and a flourishing Port has made the city a favorable location for export and import businesses. Educational institutions like the TKM College of Engineering are known as the "cradle of Kerala entrepreneurs", as they greatly encourage entrepreneurial activities. Kollam was the third city in Kerala to adopt a shopping mall culture, (after Kochi and Kozhikode). The Kollam district ranks first in livestock wealth in the state. Downtown Kollam is the leading central business district of the city, with the city remaining the most populous incorporated city in Kerala until 2005; during that time, the population density in the city was 6041 individuals per square kilometer.

Because of Kollam's importance as a trade and export hub, the Export Inspection Council of India (EICI) runs a sub-office with a laboratory facility in the city, one of the 7 sub-offices of the EICI in South India. Along with the city, the town of Punalur and suburbs of cities such as Chavara and Kundara are also industrially well-developed in nature.

== The cashew business ==
Kollam is the largest processed cashew exporter in the world; in recent years, over 600 cashew processing centres developed in the city and approximately 800,000 tonnes of raw cashews are brought to Kollam for processing every year. 90% of India's export quality cashew kernels are prepared from Kollam, with the city remaining known as the "Cashew Capital of the World". The CEPCI, responsible for the promotion of cashew exports, is expecting a rise in exported products to 275,000 tonnes by 2020.

Two principal councils/agencies are working at Kollam for the growth of the cashew business of the city, in addition to its export promotion; they are the Cashew Export Promotion Council of India (CEPCI) and the Kerala State Cashew Development Corporation Limited (KSCDC).

=== Cashew Export Promotion Council of India ===
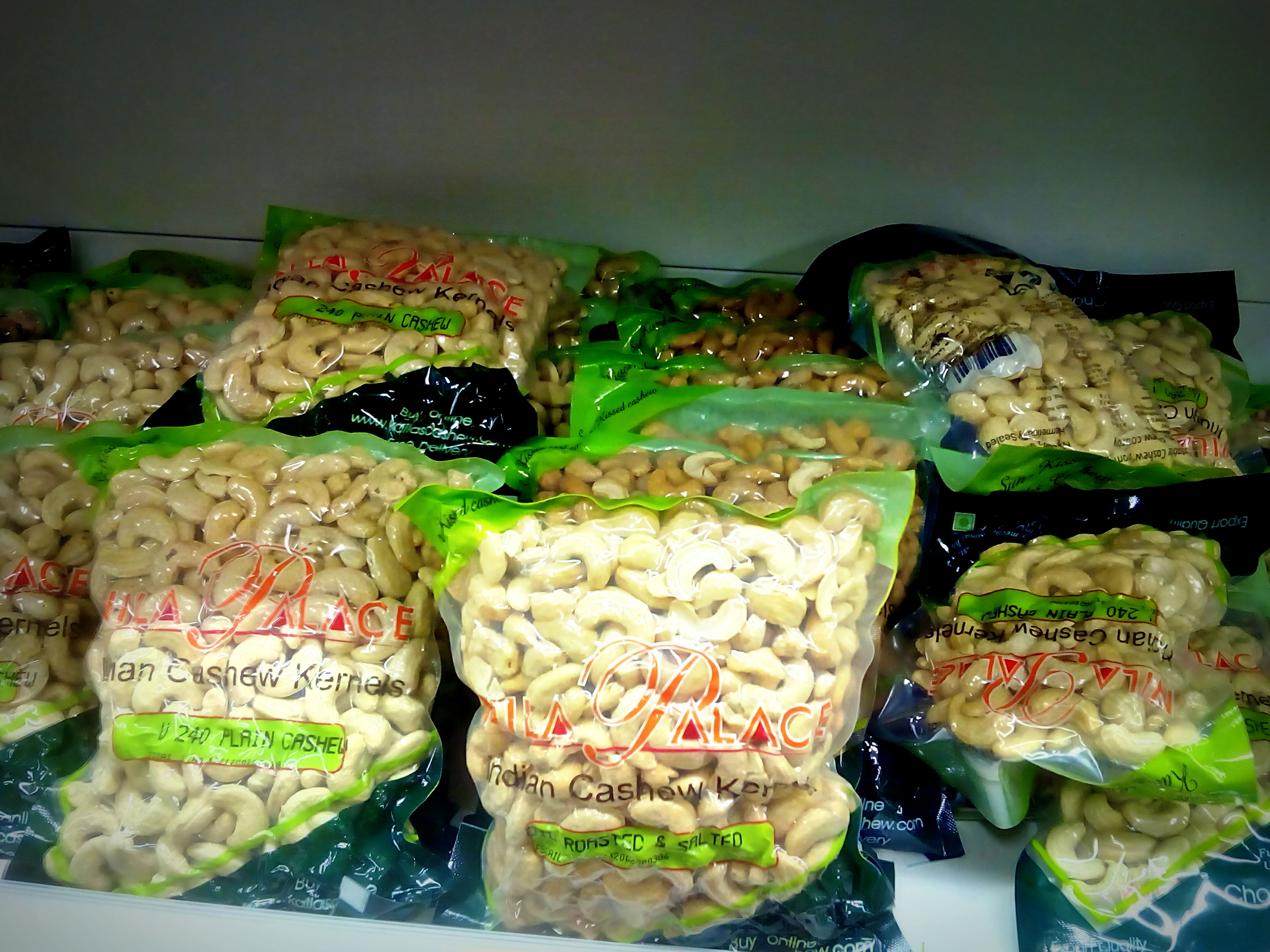
Nila's cashew packets displayed in a supermarket at Paravur near Kollam. Nila Cashews is one of Kollam's cashew exporters

The national government established the Cashew Export Promotion Council of India (CEPCI) in 1955 with the active cooperation of the cashew industry, with the stated mission of promoting exports of cashew kernels and cashew shell oil from India. The CEPC is headquartered in the Mundakkal area of Kollam, serving as an intermediary between importers of cashew kernels and exporters who are members of the council. It is also tasked with dispute resolution when problems arise on account of matters including quality standards and breaches of contract between parties, in particular with regard to import and export contracts. It undertakes numerous additional activities, such as: organising global buyer-seller meetings; organizing studies on the nutritional aspects of the cashew; and providing support to cashew processors and exporters for the improvement of their infrastructure.

=== Kerala State Cashew Development Corporation Limited ===
The Kerala State Cashew Development Corporation Limited (KSCDC) is a model employer in the cashew industry field, protecting the interest of workers and providing maximum employment to its workers; they additionally give statutory benefits like minimum wages and bonuses, prevailing in the cashew industry. The corporation remains headquartered within the city of Kollam, with its head office is situated at the Cashew House, in Mundakkal. KSCDC was incorporated in July 1969 and initiated commercial activities in the year 1971, as a company wholly owned by the Government of Kerala. The corporation now possesses a turnover of more than Rs. 250 crores.

== The seafood export business ==
Kollam is one of the famous seafood exporting business hubs of India, with many seafood exporting companies stationed din the city. The large majority of the companies work in the Maruthadi, Sakthikulangara, Kavanad, Neendakara, Asramam, Kilikollur, Thirumullavaram and Uliyakovil areas of the city. Companies such as Capithans, Kings Marine Exporters, India Food Exports and Oceanic Fisheries are some of the renowned names from the city in the seafood business. The dynamic development of the Kollam Port will accelerate further development of the seafood business in the city. The total export contribution from the city is very high compared to other Kerala cities. Kochi based Marine Products Export Development Authority(MPEDA)'s one among seven sub-regional offices is situated at Chinnakada in the city due to the importance of it as a significant marine food exporting business hub.

== Clam fishery ==
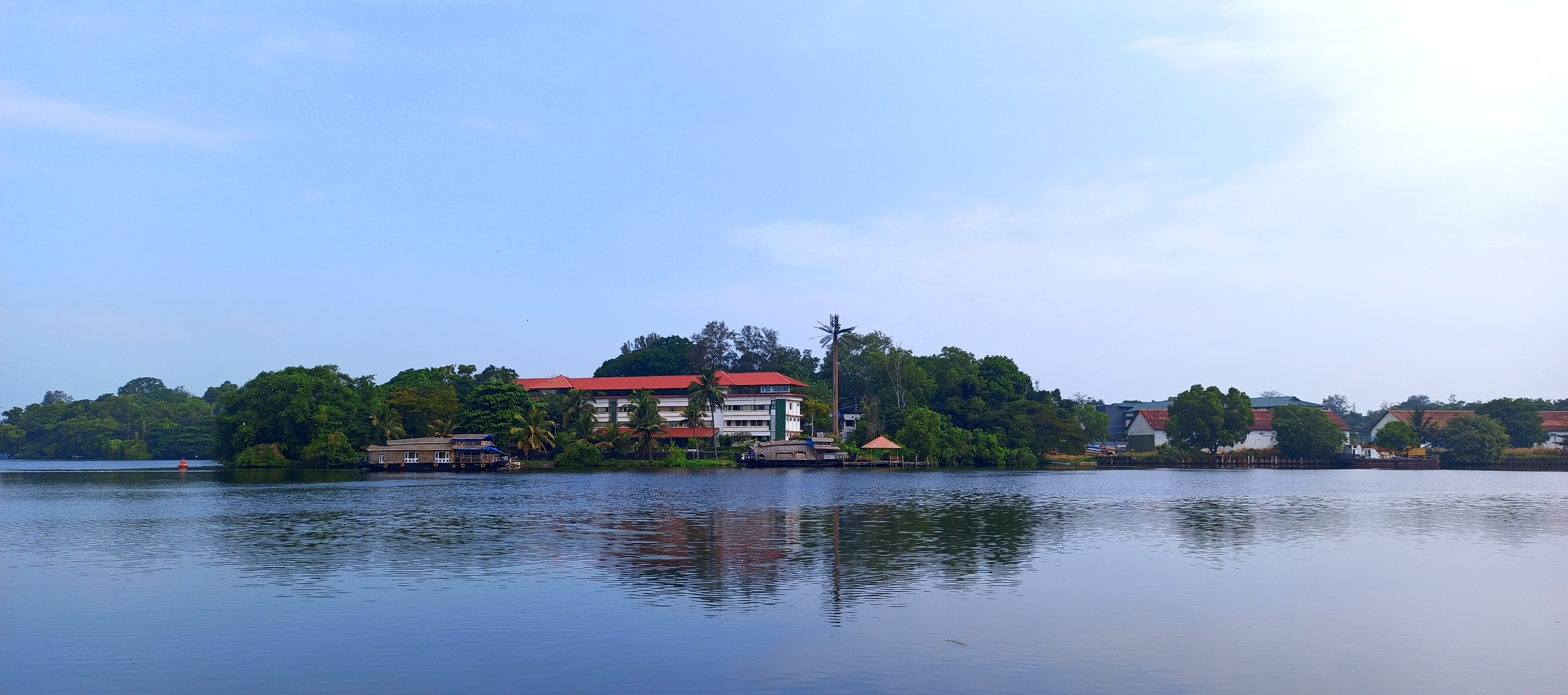
Lake Ashtamudi and KTDC hotel

Kollam's clam fishery is known for being the only Marine Stewardship Council (MSC)-certified fishery in India, an international non-profit organization set up to help transform the seafood market into a sustainable endeavor.

Ashtamudi Lake in Kollam, a Ramsar wetland of international importance and the second largest estuarine system in Kerala, is the major source of the clam used in this fishery. It has extensive mangrove habitats harboring approximately 90 species of fish and 10 species of clams, with the clam fishery in the city remaining initiated in 1981. It supports the livelihood of around 3,000 fishermen involved in the collecting, cleaning, processing and trading of clams.

80% of India's export-quality clams come from Kollam. The growth of Ashtamudi’s commercial fishery was driven by demand from Vietnam, Thailand and Malaysia in the 1980s and 90s. By 1991, the catch peaked at 10,000 tonnes a year, but declined by 50 percent in 1993 due to overfishing. Today, An average of 10,000 tonnes of clam fishing per year occurs within proximity to the city.

Apart from this, the main fishing areas of the city, like Sakthikulangara, Neendakara and Tangasseri, have emerged as the main source of lanternfish, a rich source of Omega-3 fatty acid. About 50 to 60 tonnes of Lanternfish are caught at the Sakthikulangara fishing harbor every day, sold at Rs.16/kg. This provides approximately Rs.50,000 per fishing trip for an individual boat. This fish is exclusively traded from the Sakthikulangara harbor within the Kerala state.

== Pencil slat manufacturing ==
Kollam is the largest pencil slat manufacturing hub of India., with more than 160 slat production units in Kollam, employing approximately 5,000 individuals. These Kollam-based units meet a good portion of the demand for pencil slats in the country and worldwide, with 35% of the pencil slots manufactured in the world coming from Kerala. Of the approximately 170 pencil slot manufacturing units in Kerala, 125 are based in and around Kollam district. These units are export approximately 160 loads of slots per month to companies across the world. This, according to slot manufacturers, is enough to make 20 crore pencils a month. A slot is of 185mm length, 77mm width and 5.5mm thickness; each load exported contains 300 bags with 900 slots bundled into each of them. On average, each month, 150 loads of pencil slat consignment go to pencil factories based in Delhi, Chennai, Mumbai and various places in Gujarat. Over 30 countries depend on pencil slot manufacturing units in Kollam, which produce pencils under varying brand names. These factories are working with the support of their associations, namely The Kerala Slots Factories Association and the Kerala State Small Industries Association (KSSIA). Most of the important staff office bearers of these associations are from Kollam.

== Kollam Port ==
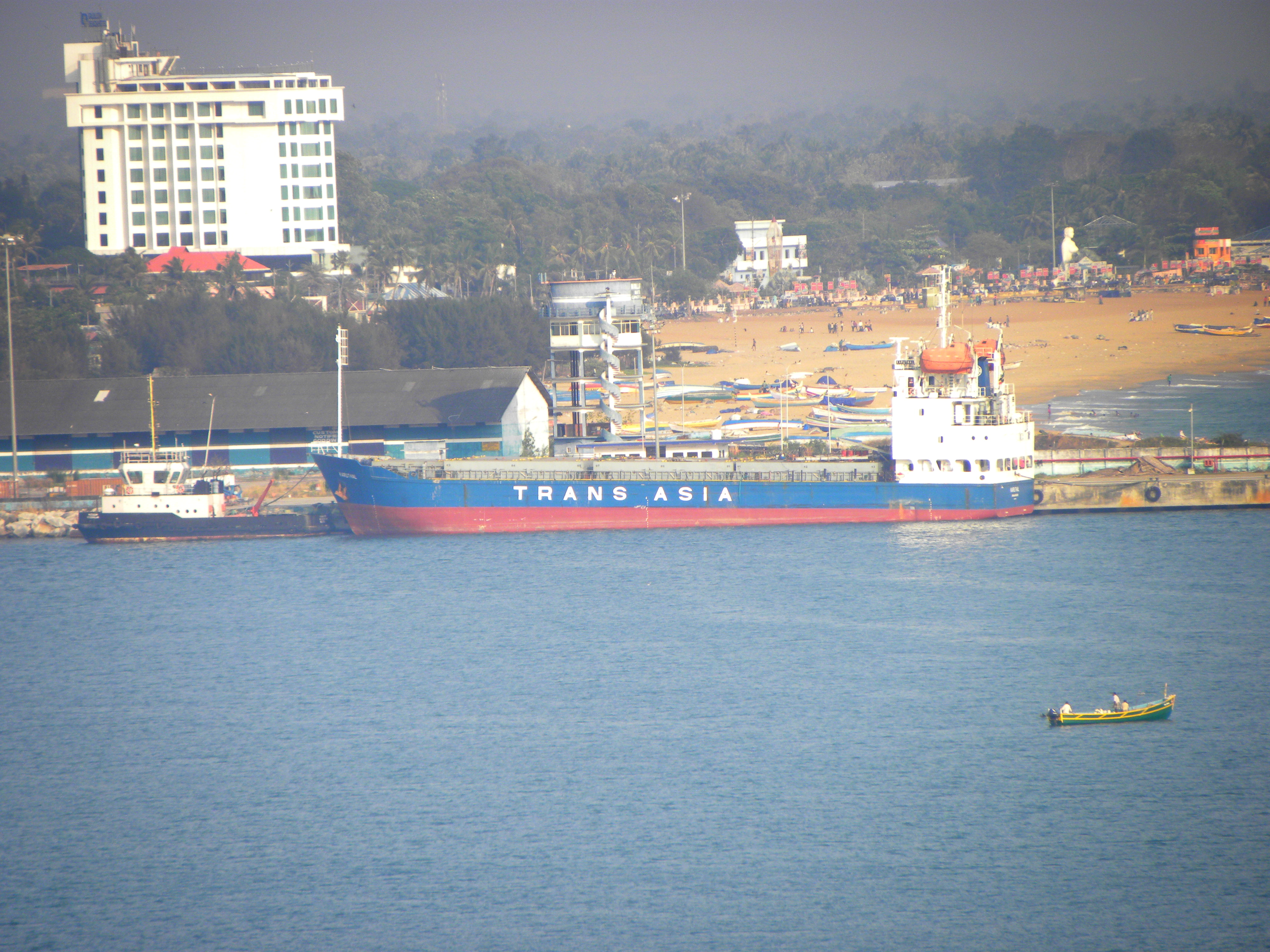
A distant view of Kollam Port

Port operations are responsible for generating a large portion of revenue in Kollam; the Kollam Port, situated 4 kilometers away from the heart of the city, is one of 20 major ports in India and is the second major port in Kerala, after the Cochin Port. Construction equipment, sand, cashews and industrial products for companies and organisations including the Vikram Sarabhai Space Centre (VSSC) and Kerala Minerals and Metals Limited (KMML) are transported through Kollam Port. To modernize the state's second-largest port, The Government of Kerala is planning to build a wharf for the port, capable of accommodating 6 ships at a time. It is one of the two ports in Kerala with an online customs clearance facility and a Vessel Tracking and Monitoring System or VTMS. The port is now undergoing a second phase of development worth Rs.125 crores.

== Information technology ==
IT development is a major revenue earner of Kollam. A large technology park, Kollam Technopark, is functioning in the suburb of the city, which is the only technological park in India that will be accessible by road, rail, water, and air transportation facilities after the inauguration of Seaplane service was scheduled to start in December 2014. The Government of Kerala began several small Information Technology parks, named Techno-lodges, prior to the recent project in the neighborhoods of the city, but these projects ceased operation following their initiation.

The Kollam Technopark is part of Technopark, Trivandrum, built on the hub-and-spoke model for the development of the Information Technology industry in Kerala. As the second phase of development for the IT industry in Kerala, the Kollam Technopark shall remain constructed in one of the earliest industrial towns of Kerala, Kundara. Located on the banks of the Kanjiracode Lake, a tributary of the Ashtamudi in Kollam. this technopark is to offer support including uniform talent distribution, infrastructure and support for IT platforms (e.g. telecom, datacom and digital exchanges), excellent infrastructure availability and back-up support available in Kollam.

== Notable firms ==
Kollam has an array of manufacturing and other industrial corporations, including mineral sand mining and related material production plants, such as electrical equipment and Titanium sponge in the city.

=== United Electrical Industries Limited (UNILEC), Pallimukku ===
United Electrical Industries Limited, an ISO 9001:2000-accredited State Level Public Enterprise, has been successfully operating in the electrical engineering sector since 1950. This company is one of the pioneers in energy meter manufacturing and Switchgear items and is situated at Pallimukku in the city. UEI Ltd. has supplied over 40 lakhs of electromechanical meters and 50 lakhs of electronic meters for domestic and industrial purposes. The company received several awards for the achievements for their efforts in energy conservation.

=== Indian Rare Earths Limited (IREL) ===
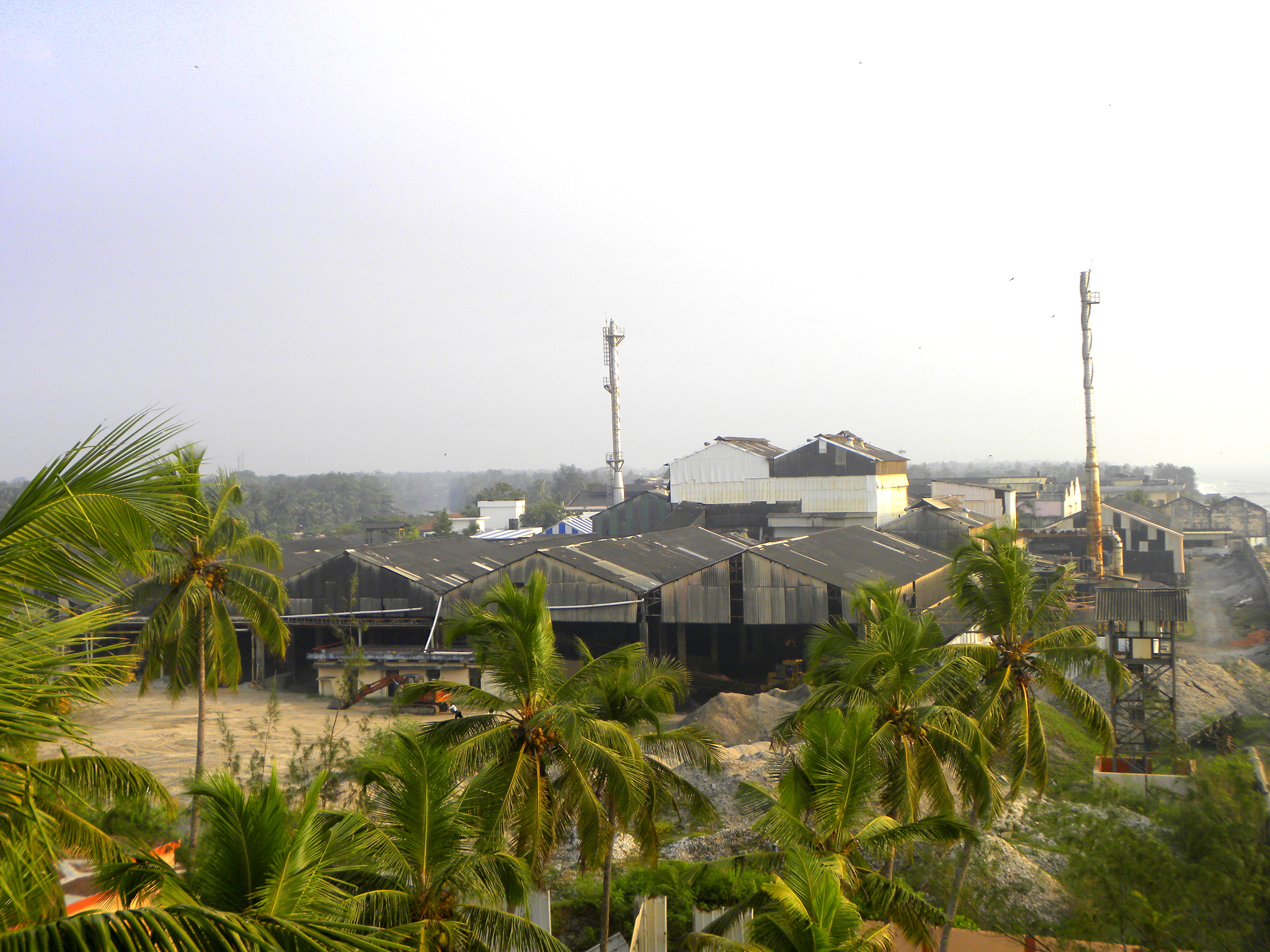
Corporate Research Centre of Indian Rare Earths in Kollam

Indian Rare Earths Limited (IREL) is a government-owned ISO 9002 Certified corporation in India. One of the four production plants of IREL is situated near Chavara, in the suburbs of the city. The plant operates on a mining area containing as high as a percentage of 40% with regard to heavy minerals and extending over a length of 23 kilometres in the Chavara belt. The present annual production capacity of the Chavara unit, engaged in dry and wet (dredging or up-gradation) mining and mineral separation, stands at 1,54,000t of ilmenite, 9,500t of rutile, 14,000t of zircon and 7,000t of sillimanite. The plant additionally possesses facilities for the annual production of ground zircon called Zirflor (-45 micron) and Microzir (1-3 micron) on the order of 6,000t and 500t, respectively. The other plants of the company remain the plant at Manavalakurichi, OSCOM and the Rare Earths Division at Aluva.

The Kollam coast of Kerala possesses the largest mineral sand deposit within the nation. This belt, commonly known as the Chavara deposit after its main locality, covers a total length of 22 kilometres and a width of approximately 8 kilometres along its northern side, in addition to approximately 6 kilometres along its southern side. The Chavara barrier beach portion contains a concentration of heavy minerals above 60% and the Chavara deposit is estimated to contain approximately 127 million tonnes of heavy minerals, with an ilmenite content of 80 million tonnes from a reserve of raw sand encompassing 1400 million tonnes. The deposit is quite rich with regard to ilmenite, rutile and zircon; the ilmenite deposits within the region happen to be of weathered variety, including an approximate titanium dioxide composition of 60% .

=== Kerala Minerals and Metals Ltd. (KMML) ===
Kerala Minerals and Metals Ltd. (KMML) is an integrated, titanium dioxide-manufacturing public sector undertaking in Kollam. Its operations comprise mining, mineral separation and synthetic rutile and pigment-production plants. Apart from producing rutile-grade titanium dioxide pigment, utilised within various types of industries, it also produces other products, such as ilmenite, rutile, synthetic rutile, zircon and sillimanite. It is one of the best-performing public sector units in India.

=== Parvathy Mills ===
Parvathy Mills is a public sector undertaking, maintained under the National Textile Development Corporation in Kollam. It is situated very close to the heart of the city. It was one of the glorious spinning units in India. The mill is under the consideration of the National Textile Development Corporation for a proposed renovation. and is additionally placed in the master plan of a project encompassing the entirety of the city, as the city government is planning to build a large-scale garment manufacturing unit via the utilisation of available infrastructural facilities.
