= Zaporizhzhya Titanium-Magnesium Plant =

European manufacturer of titanium sponge

Zaporizhzhya Titanium-Magnesium
- Industry: Non-ferrous metallurgy
- Products: Non-ferrous metal, Titanium, Magnesium, Germanium
- Website: ztmc.zp.ua
- Footnotes / references Код ЄДРПОУ 38983006

Zaporizhzhya Titanium-Magnesium Plant is the only manufacturer of titanium sponge in Europe. ZTMP (or ZTMK) is located in Zaporizhzhya, Ukraine, and the plant produces titanium ingots, as well as slabs that are widely used as a structural material in nuclear power, chemical engineering, shipbuilding, and many other industries.

== See also ==
- List of countries by titanium production
- Titanium Sponge Plant in India
