= Cashew House =

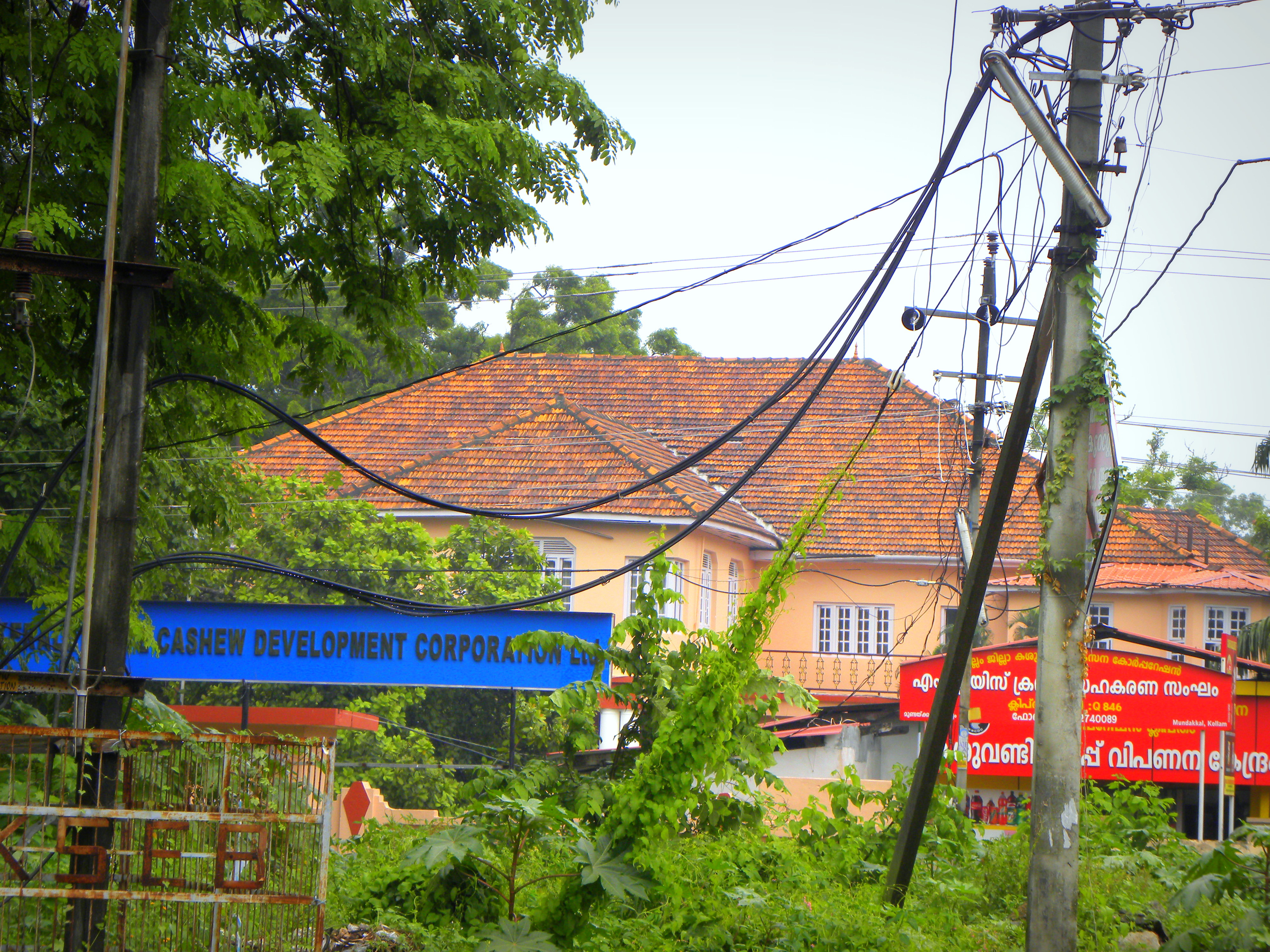
- A distant view of Cashew House in Mundakkal, Kollam city
- Interactive map of the Cashew House area

General information
- Architectural style: Indian
- Location: Mundakkal, Kollam city, India
- Coordinates: 8.876947°N 76.595962°E
- Completed: 1935
- Client: Lindsay Johnson

The Cashew House in Mundakkal, Kollam city, is the headquarters of Kerala State Cashew Development Corporation Limited in Kerala, India. It is very closely related with the history of ancient Quilon and the Cashew business of Kollam city.

== History ==
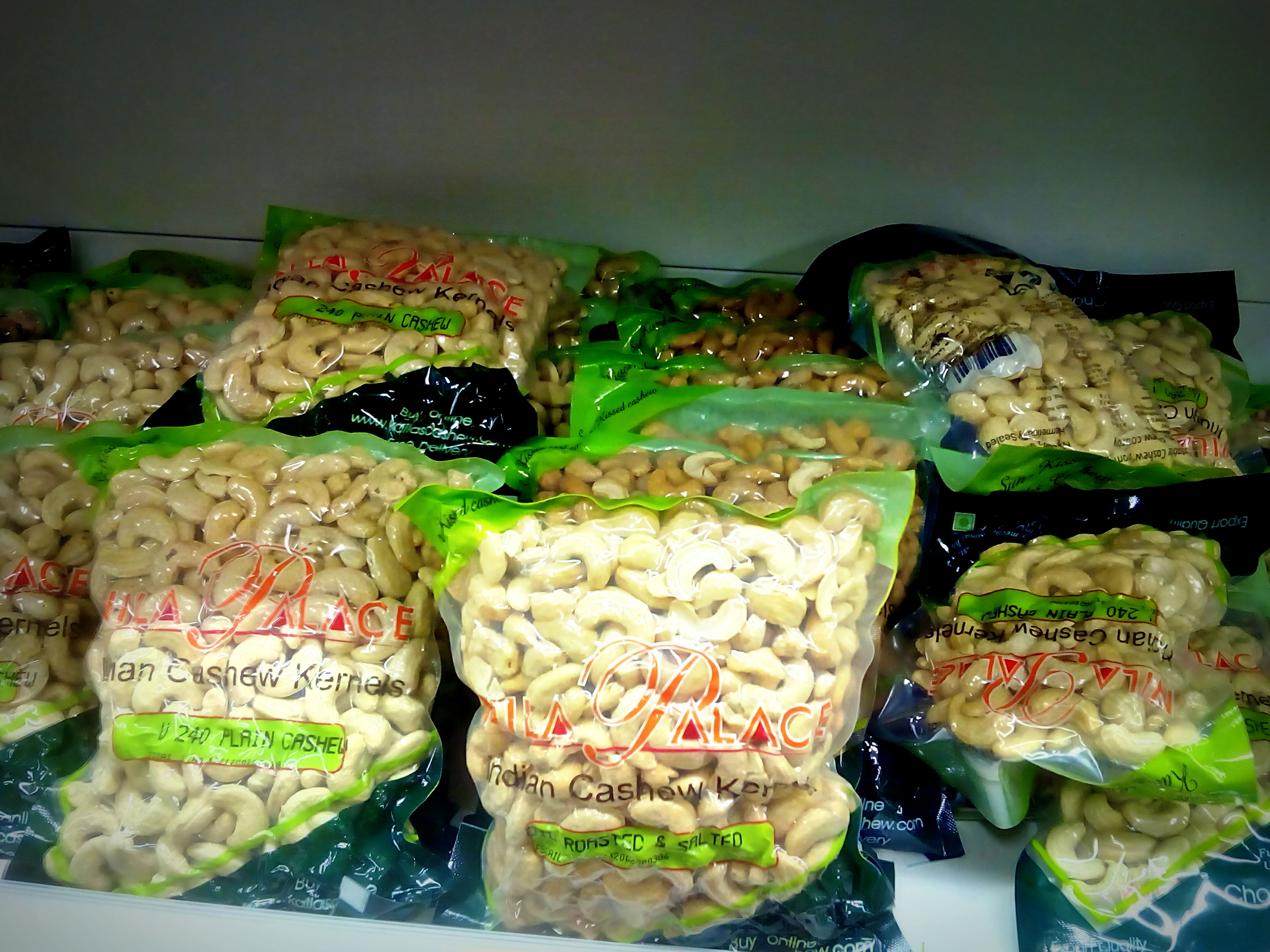
Nila Cashew packets displayed in a supermarket at Paravur near Kollam. Nila Cashews is one among the popular Kollam-based cashew exporters

Cashew business and export from Kollam city is world-famous and that is why Kollam is known as Cashew Capital of the World. The gigantic two-storied building was owned by an American businessman Lindsay Johnson since it was built in 1935. He came to Kerala as the representative of a New York-based food company. He named his daughter Kerala because of his love to the state. Johnson became one of the richest men of his times because of his cashew business in Kollam city. But he was forced to go back to his country, United States during the time of World War II, when the American Government ordered its citizens in India to return. Johnson pledged his house to the well-established Quilon bank at that time and had handed over his cashew business to his manager Swaminathan, while looking forward to return after the war.

But later, Swaminathan told Johnson that his business was running at a loss due to the world war and the Quilon bank was looking to attach the building. The manager knowingly diverted the profit from Johnson's business and later Quilon Bank had attached the property. Later, Mr. F.X. Pereira (former owner of Kerala Minerals and Metals and started mining rare earth minerals from the shores of Kollam) acquired the building in an auction. As time passed, the old bungalow of Mr. Johnson was procured by the Kerala Government to make it the headquarters of Kerala State Cashew Development Corporation Limited, a public sector company that deals with cashew business in Kollam and the entire Kerala.
