= Small Industries Development Corporation =

Type of government agency in Indian states

Small Industries Development Corporations ('SIDCO') are state-owned companies or agencies in the states of India which were established at various times under the policy of the Government of India for the promotion of small scale industries.

== Introduction ==
An important and rapidly expanding area of India's economy, the SIDCO industry encourages entrepreneurship and creates significant jobs at low capital costs. It offers a broad range of goods and services for both domestic and international markets, supporting major sectors.

To assist SIDCO units, the government collaborates with the non-profit SIDCO Promotion Council. It helps MSMEs access international opportunities, links them with banks, legislators, and business owners, and works with State SIDCs to reach even the tiniest units in India.

== Membership ==
By assisting businesses in forming global networks and alliances, SIDCO India membership provides access to international commercial prospects. The Council serves as a one-stop shop for exporters and supports the Ministry's goal of realizing SIDCO India's full potential. It offers SIDCO companies looking to expand into foreign markets comprehensive advice and practical assistance. All MSMEs, service providers, entrepreneurs, start-ups, chambers, and state-level SIDCO entities in all industry sectors are eligible to join.

== List of SIDCO ==
Alphabetical list:

- Small Industries Development Corporation of Jammu and Kashmir (JKSIDCO).
- Kerala Small Industries Development Corporation Limited (Kerala SIDCO)
- SIDCO Ladakh
- Tamil Nadu Small Industries Development Corporation Limited (TANSIDCO).
