= Titanium production by country =

Titanium ilmenite production

This is a list of countries by titanium production based on USGS figures. Units are in metric tons.

== Current data ==
List of countries by titanium production (2024)
| Country | Mineral concentrates | | |
| Country | Total | Ilmenite | Rutile |
|---|---|---|---|
| World | 9,360,000 | 8,910,000 | 450,000 |
| China | 3,300,000 | 3,300,000 | – |
| Mozambique | 1,908,000 | 1,900,000 | 8,000 |
| South Africa | 1,400,000 | 1,300,000 | 100,000 |
| Australia | 600,000 | 400,000 | 200,000 |
| India | 404,000 | 391,000 | 13,000 |
| Norway | 360,000 | 360,000 | – |
| Canada | 350,000 | 350,000 | – |
| Vietnam | 331,500 | 331,500 | – |
| Senegal | 300,000 | 300,000 | – |
| Madagascar | 246,000 | 240,000 | 6,000 |
| Kenya | 228,000 | 188,000 | 40,000 |
| South Korea | 137,976 | 137,976 | – |
| Ukraine | 130,000 | 120,000 | 10,000 |
| Sierra Leone | 118,610 | 58,610 | 60,000 |
| United States | 100,000 | 100,000 | – |
| Malaysia | 32,435 | 24,076 | 8,359 |
| Sri Lanka | 32,233 | 31,492 | 741 |
| Brazil | 17,369 | 17,369 | – |
| Kazakhstan | 16,000 | – | – |
| Gambia | 12,000 | 12,000 | – |
| Saudi Arabia | 9,700 | 9,700 | – |
| Turkey | 7,226 | – | 7,226 |
| Russia | 1,532 | 1,532 | – |
| Thailand | 2 | 2 | – |
| Japan | – | – | – |

== Historical data ==
| Country | 2010 | 2011 | 2012 | 2013 | 2014 | 2015 | 2016 | 2020 | 2021 | 2022 | 2023 | 2024 | 2025 (e) |
|---|---|---|---|---|---|---|---|---|---|---|---|---|---|
| World | 137,000 | 186,000 | 200,000 | 209,000 | 194,000 | 160,000 | 170,000 | 210,000 | 210,000 | 270,000 | 330,000 | 340,000 | 370,000 |
| China | 57,800 | 60,000 | 80,000 | 105,000 | 110,000 | 62,000 | 60,000 | 110,000 | 120,000 | 175,000 | 220,000 | 220,000 | 250,000 |
| Japan | 31,600 | 56,000 | 40,000 | 42,000 | 25,000 | 42,000 | 54,000 | 50,000 | 35,000 | 50,000 | 57,000 | 55,000 | 58,000 |
| Russia | 25,800 | 30,000 | 42,000 | 44,000 | 42,000 | 40,000 | 38,000 | 33,000 | 27,000 | 25,000 | 25,000 | 25,000 | 22,000 |
| Kazakhstan | 14,500 | 20,700 | 25,000 | 12,000 | 9,000 | 9,000 | 9,000 | 15,000 | 16,000 | 15,000 | 16,000 | 19,000 | 20,000 |
| Saudi Arabia | – | – | – | – | – | – | – | 15,600 | 3,700 | 5,000 | 11,000 | 15,000 | 15,600 |
| India | – | – | – | – | – | 500 | 500 | 250 | 250 | 250 | 250 | 250 | 250 |
| Ukraine | 7,400 | 9,000 | 10,000 | 6,300 | 7,200 | 7,700 | 7,500 | 6,000 | 5,400 | 1,000 | 0 | 0 | 0 |

(e) = Estimated values based on USGS preliminary publications and capacity data. The US government withholds its specific small-scale electronics-grade sponge volume to protect corporate proprietary information.

== India ==
- Titanium Sponge Plant of India (TSPI) is located at Kerala Minerals and Metals Ltd (KMML), Chavara, Kollam district of Kerala.
- Aeroalloy Technologies, a unit of PTC Industries, has world's largest titanium plant with 6,000 ton capacity in DIC Bhatgaon.
- MIDHANI has a dedicated titanium alloy plant of 1,000 ton capacity per annum.

== Kenya ==
- Base Titanium of Australia
- Tiomin Resources of Canada
  - Tiomin Kenya
  - Location: Eldoret; Kwale

== Mozambique ==
- Kenmare Resources of Ireland
  - Kenmare Moma Mining
  - Kenmare Moma Processing
  - Moma Mineral Sands Project
  - Location Nampula Province
  - Involves investment from African Development Bank (ADB); European Investment Bank (BEI), the Development Bank of Southern Africa (DBSA); and the German Development Bank (KfW).
  - Principally mining Ilmenite

== Russia ==
- VSMPO-AVISMA

== Sierra Leone ==
- Sierra Rutile of Ohio; since 1967
  - Location: Bonthe/Port Loko District; Tonkoli District
  - Branch Energy UK
  - Diamond Works
  - Executive Outcomes RSA
  - Sandline International
- Sierra Leone Ore and Metal Company since 1963
  - Location: Mokanji Hills in the Southern Province
- See: 1994 Mines and Minerals Act (Sierra Leone)

== South Africa ==
- BHP
- Anglo American – Namakwa Sands mines
- Richards Bay Minerals RBM
- Kumba Resources – and subsidiary Ticor Limited
- Southern Mining Corporation – Bothaville heavy mineral occurrence
- Mineral Commodities of Australia Xolobeni mine, Transkei Coast.
  - East London Development Zone Corporation (ELDZC) – associated smelting project

== Ukraine ==
- State Property Fund of Ukraine:
  - Zaporizhia Titanium-Magnesium Plant
  - United Mining and Chemical Company
  - Demurinsky Mining and Processing Plant
  - VSMPO Titan Ukraine
  - Sumykhimprom

== United States ==
- Allegheny Technologies
- Titanium Metals Corporation

== External sources ==
- Don't Let Titanium Become The Curse Of Kwale; Opinion by Sam Wainaina, The East African (Nairobi), 18 January 2001
- Titanium mining in Mozambique, from Afrol
- Sierra Leone titanium mining overview from Project Underground
- Mining in Sierra Leone, Encyclopedia of the Nations
- MBendi – Republic of South Africa – Heavy Minerals Mining – page
- MBendi – Africa – Heavy Minerals Mining – page
