= Chavara Parukutty Amma =

Indian dancer

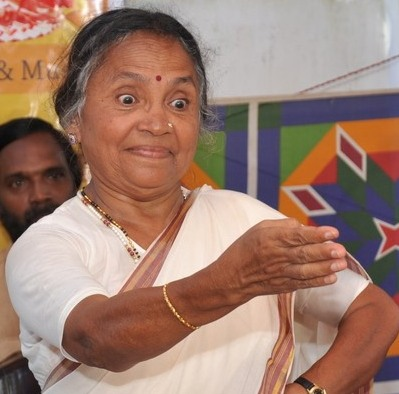
- Chavara Parukutty Amma demonstrating a Kathakali mudra, 2011.
- Born: 12 February 1943; Chekkatu Kizhakkethil, Kerala, India
- Died: 7 February 2019 (aged 75); Chavara, Kerala
- Occupations: Kathakali dancer and teacher
- Works: Kacha Devayani
- Parent(s): N. Shankaran Achary; Naniyamma
- Awards: Kerala Kalamandalam Kalaratnam

Chavara Parukutty Amma (12 February 1943 – 7 February 2019) was an Indian artiste of the Kathakali dance drama. She was one of the few women exponents of this overwhelmingly male tradition. For her services to the art of Kerala, she was honoured with the Kerala Kalamandalam and the Kerala Sangeetha Nataka Akademi awards.

== Life ==
Chavara Parukutty Amma was born to Naniyamma and N. Shankaran Achary, a goldsmith, at Chekkatu Kizhakkethil in Kerala, the youngest of their three children. She obtained an undergraduate degree in economics from the Fatima Mata National College.

Trained as a classical dancer, she switched to Kathakali in her teenage years. Her first teacher was Muthupilakkadu Gopala Panikker.

Parukutty Amma had a daughter, Dhanya, who is also a dance artiste.

She died at Chavara near Kollam on 7 February 2019.

== Career ==
Parukutty Amma's debut performance was at the age of 14, at the Kottankulangara Devi Temple at Chavara. At the time, women were hesitant in taking up the genre. The field of Kathakali has traditionally been dominated by men, who would play both male and female roles. She took on female roles mainly, but has portrayed male roles as well.

In her youth, Kathakali was of interest mainly to women of upper castes, who took a dilettante's approach to it. As the daughter of a goldsmith, Parukutty had to struggle for admission to a local dance school, Leelamani Nrithakalalayam. She was relegated to minor roles, and even when she began to perform major parts in the dance drama, having joined the Poruvazhi Sreekrishnavilasm Kaliyogam, her name would barely appear in festival brochures.

Parukutty Amma was fortunate in obtaining admission to a Kathakali institute; without credentials from the academy, other women were severely disadvantaged. Even she faced unfortunate odds in her career, scarcely being able to make a living from it.

Parukutty Amma's debut was with the dance drama Poothanamoksham in 1958, in the role of Lalita, the benevolent manifestation of the demoness Poothana who was sent by Kamsa to kill the baby Krishna. She then began training herself in male roles under Poruvazhi Gopala Pillai, the first presentation being of Bhima in Kalyanasaugandhikam.

Mankulam Vishnu Namboothiri, a Kathakali doyen, saw her performance and undertook her further training in every female role in Kathakali. Her essaying of the role of Devayani was particularly lauded for her command of nuance and emotion, as Devayani first beholds Kacha. Indeed, she often played the male role of Kacha as well.

In 2003, Parukutty Amma opened Kerala Natya Dhara, a school for dance at Sankaramangalam.

Parukutty Amma received the Kerala Kalamandalam and the Mathrubhumi Grihalakshmi awards.

A film on her life and achievements, Chavara Parukutty: Kathakaliyile Sthree Parvam, was produced by P.R. Sreekumar.

== Selected reading ==
- Shwetha E. George (17 January 2012). "They dance despite the disparity". The Hindu.
- P. Geetha (2011). Kaliyammamar. Rainbow Books.
