= Coastal Road =

Coastal Road may refer to:

- Coastal Road (Mumbai), a grade separated expressway in Mumbai, India
- Highway 2 (Israel), also known as Coastal Road north of Tel Aviv
- Manila–Cavite Expressway, also known as Coastal Road, an expressway in the Philippines
- Coastal Road massacre, the 1978 hijacking of a bus on the Coastal Highway (Highway 2) in Israel
- Kollam-Paravur Coastal Road, Kollam city, Kerala, India
