= Mundakkal Beach =

Tourism beach in Kollam, Kerala, India

Mundakkal Beach മുണ്ടയ്ക്കല്‍ ബീച്ച്
- Beach
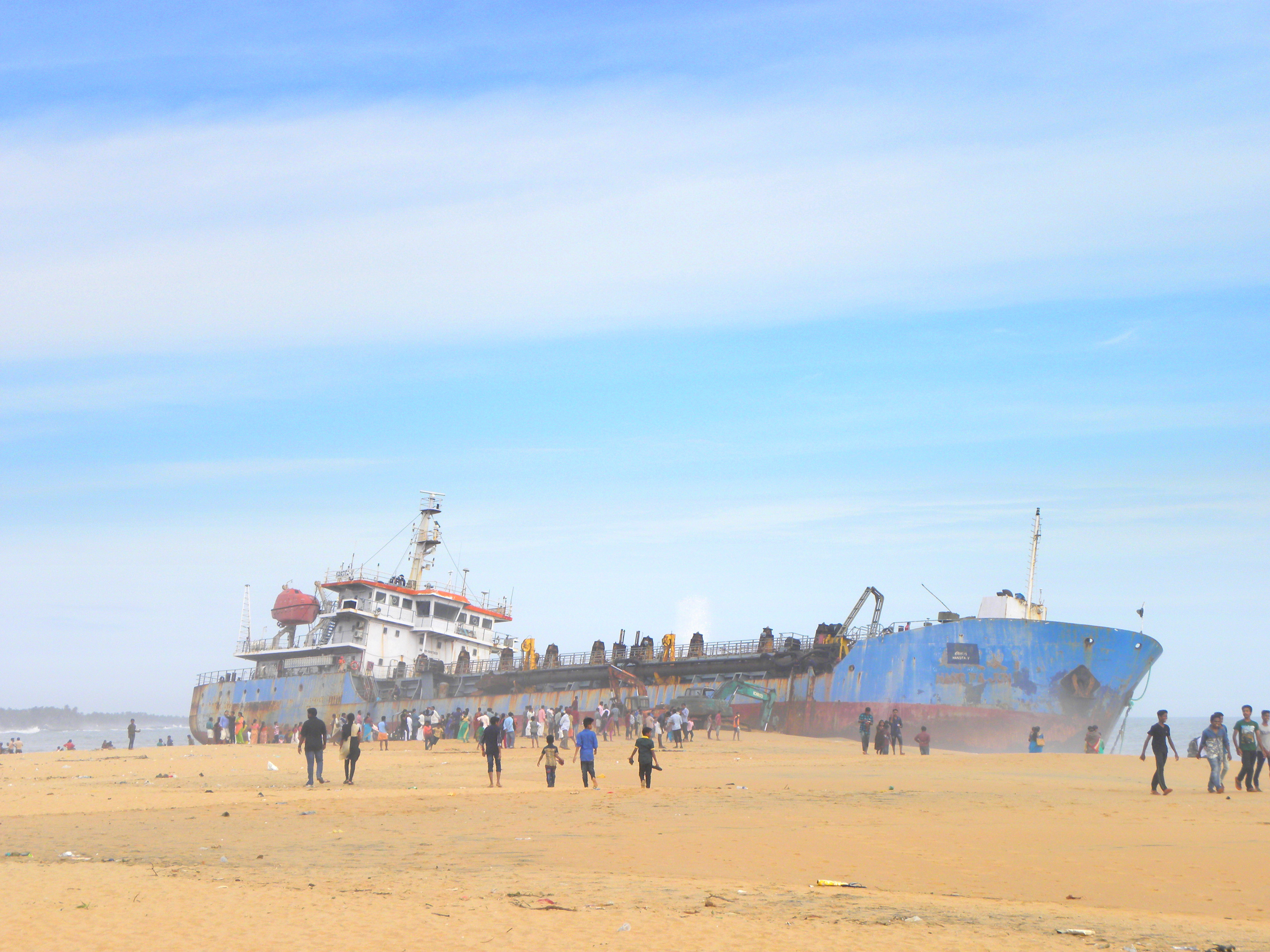
- ಡ್ರೆಡ್ಜರ್ ಹಡಗು - ಮುಂಡಕ್ಕಲ್ ಕಡಲತೀರ

- Location within Kollam Location within Kerala Location within India
- Coordinates: 8°51′46.5″N 76°36′21.7″E
- Location: Mundakkal, Kollam, India

Dimensions
  - Length: 350+ m
- Hazard rating: Low
- Access: Bus Station - 4.7 km, Railway Station - 3.9 km, Ferry Terminal - 4.7 km

Mundakkal Beach (Malayalam: മുണ്ടയ്ക്കല്‍ ബീച്ച്) is a beach in the city of Kollam, Kerala. The beach is situated at Mundakkal, a neighbourhood that is a local cashew processing hub. On 21 June 2016 the dredger ship Hansitha washed up on the shore. Scrapping of the dredger ship started on 18 October 2017. The beach is also known as 'Mundakkal Papanasham Beach'. Devotees believe that a dip in the waters of Mundakkal Papanasham Beach will wash off all the sins in one's life.

== Location ==
Mundakkal Beach is situated on the side of Kollam-Paravur Coastal Road. The beach is about 4 km away from Chinnakada and 11.2 km away from Paravur.

== Importance ==
The beach is now one of the prime tourism spots in Kollam city due to the arrival of the dredger ship, 'Hansitha', to the shore. The ship was lying anchored 3 nautical miles off the Kollam coast since November 2013. Due to heavy waves, the unoccupied ship washed ashore on the Mundakkal beach in June 2016.

The beach is also an important location for annual ‘balitharpanam’ ritual. As per Hindu beliefs, the ritual performed on the new moon day in the Malayalam month of Karkidakom will appease the spirits of their forefathers and bring good fortune in the year ahead. Thousands of devotees, including women and children, offer ‘bali' on the banks of Thirumullavaram Beach and Mundakkal Beach that day every year, along with the other famous beaches and river banks in Kerala.

== Gallery ==
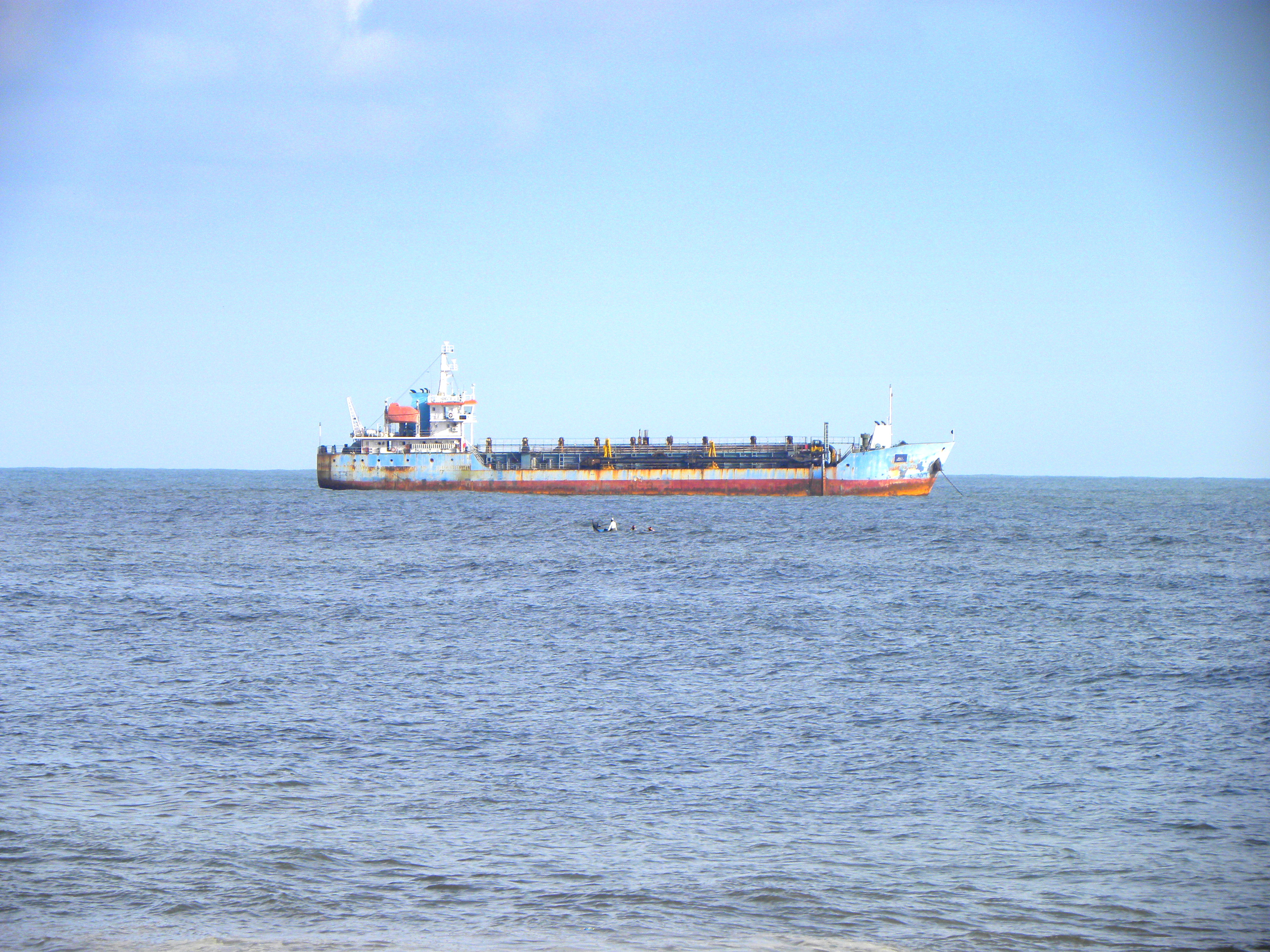
Dredgre 'Hansitha' before reaching the shores during August 2014

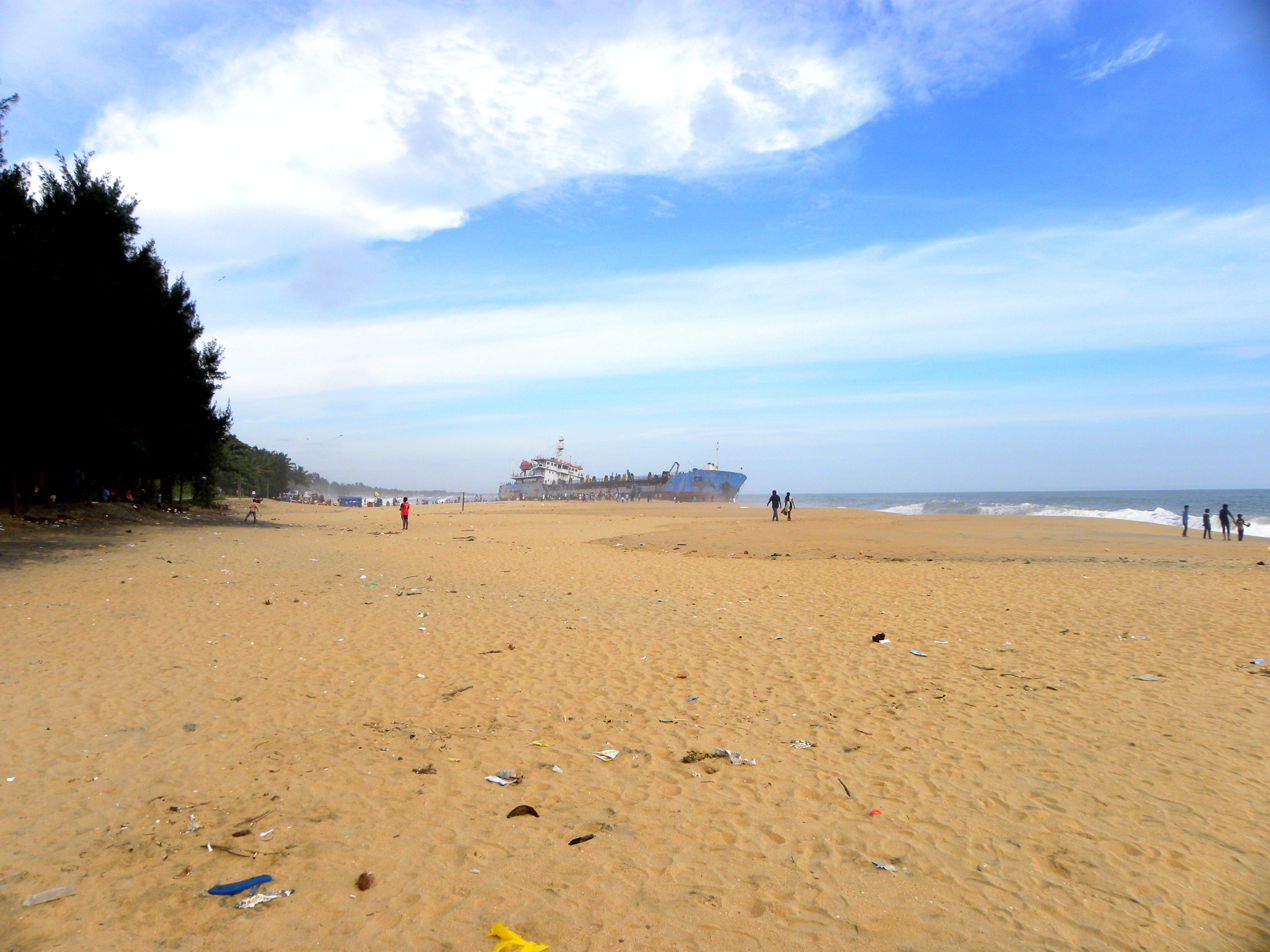
A distant view of the beach

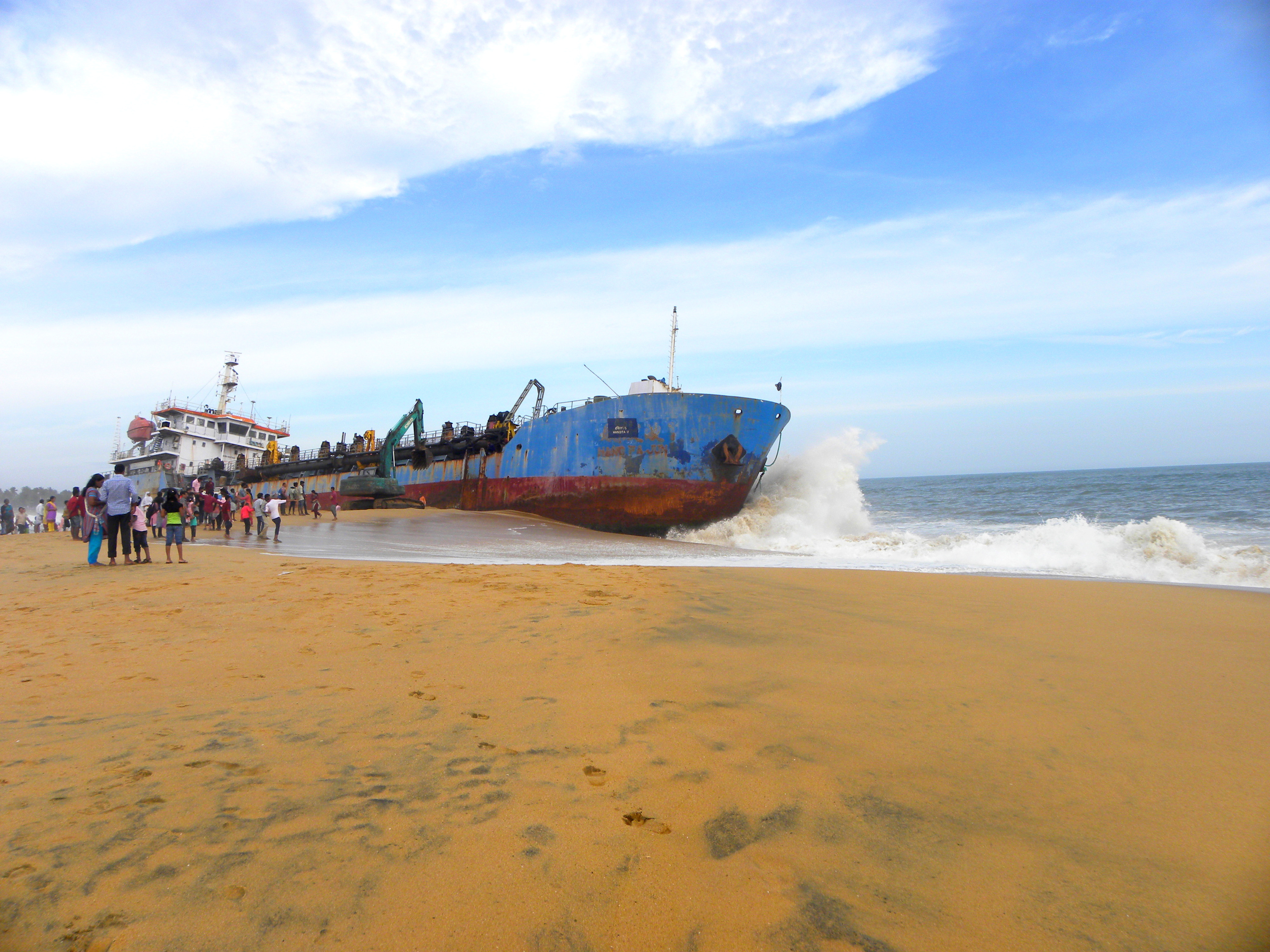
Dredger "Hansitha" during Jul 2016.jpg

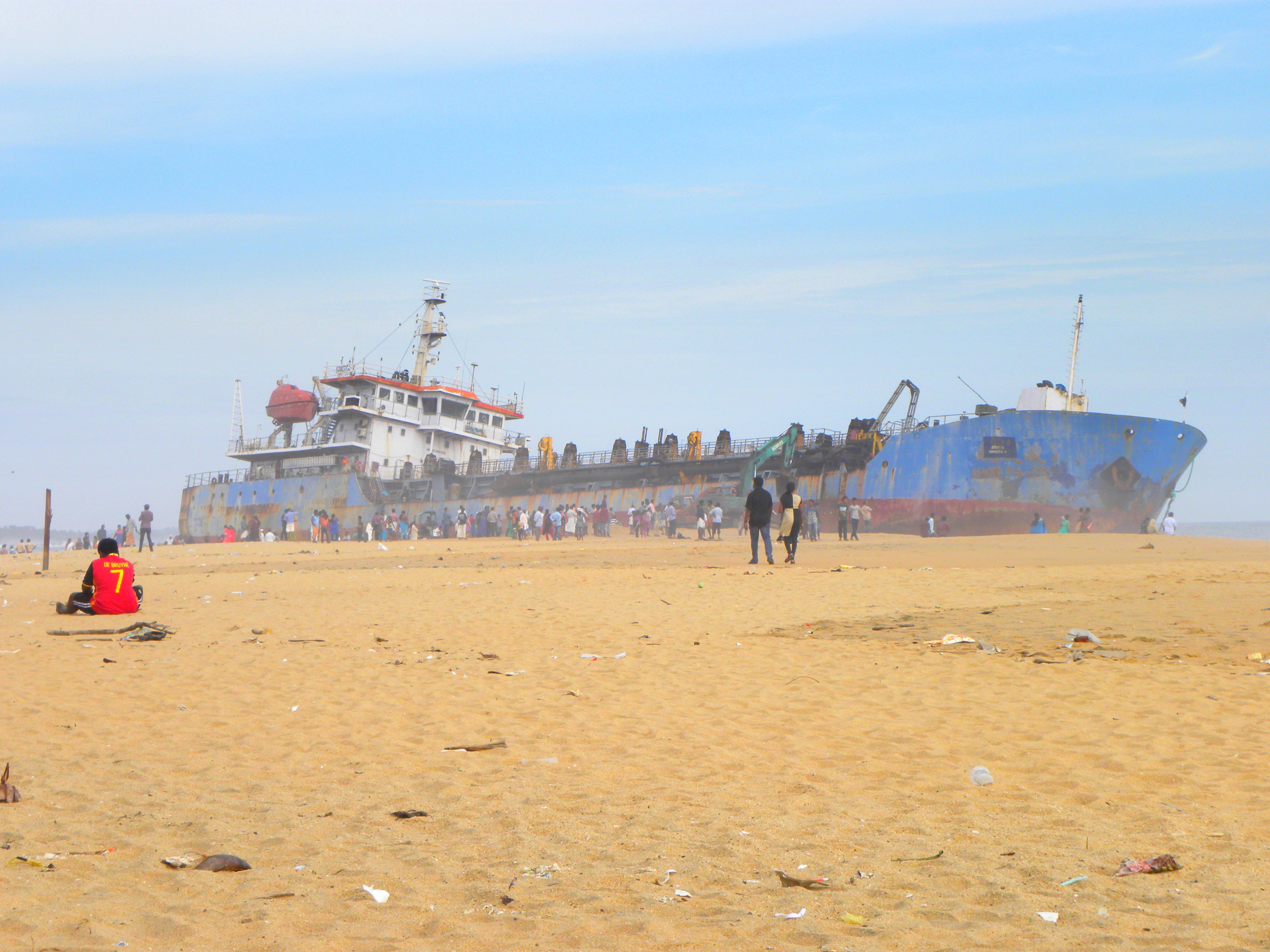
Side view of 'Hansitha'

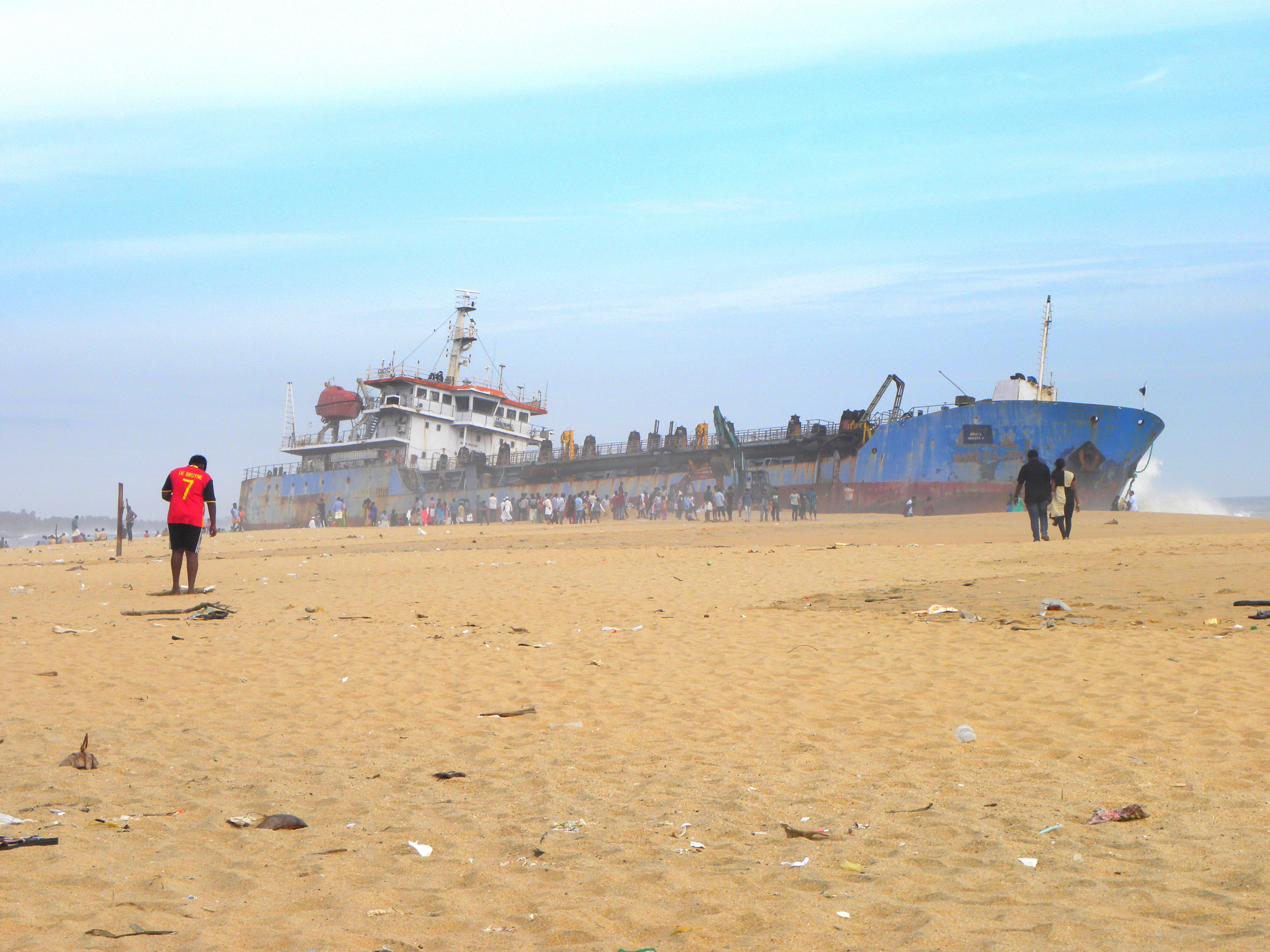
Children playing near 'Hansitha' at Mundakkal coast
