= Kollam-Paravur Coastal Road =

Road in Kerala, India

- Kollam-Paravur Coastal Road highlighted in red
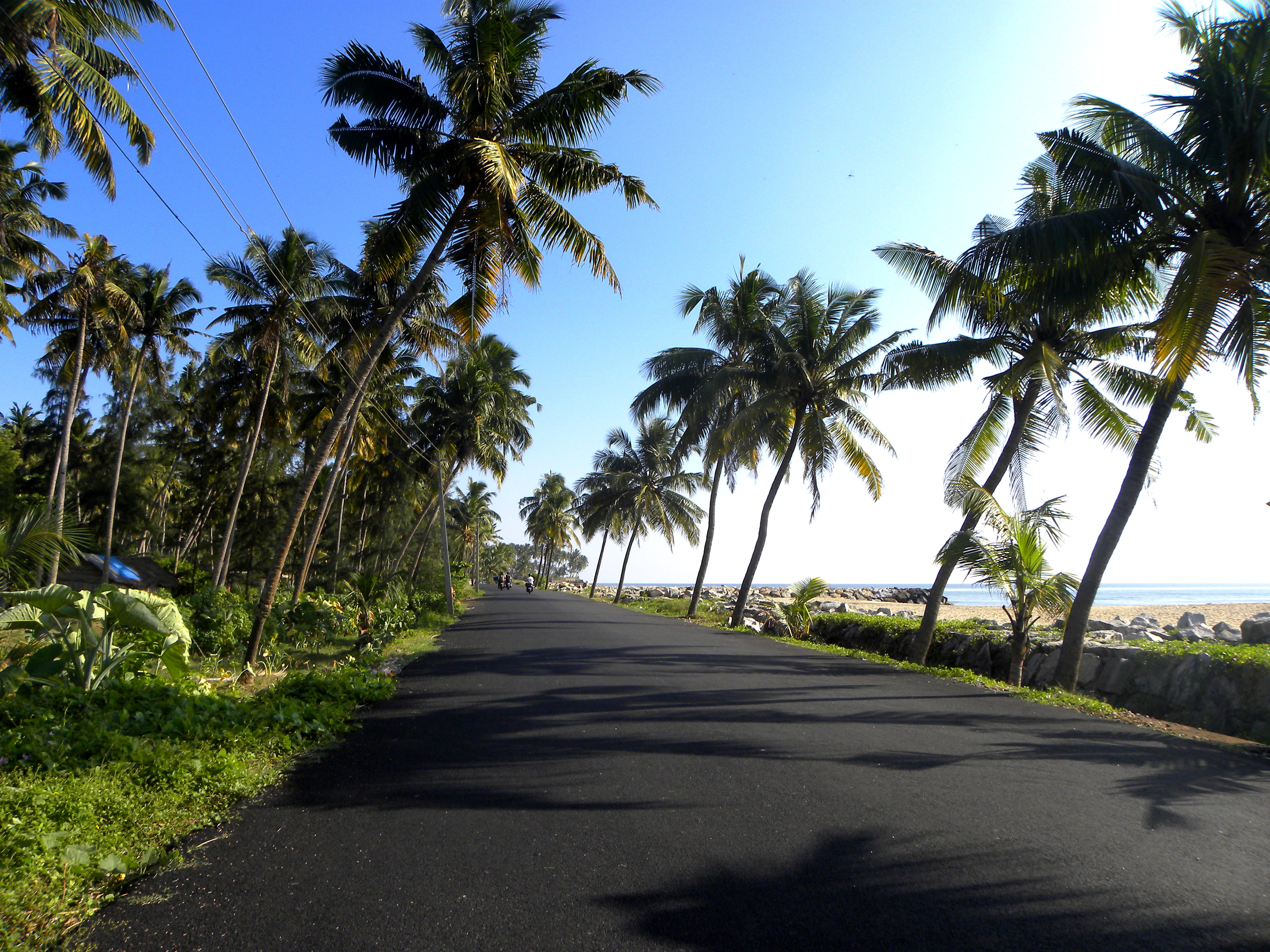
- Kollam-Paravur Coastal Road near Pozhikkara beach

Route information
- Maintained by Kerala Harbour Engineering Department
- Length: 14.1 km (8.8 mi)
- Status: Under Reconstruction

Major junctions
- North end: Chinnakada
- Kochupilamoodu; Kollam Beach; Mundakkal Beach; Kakkathoppu; Mukkom; Thanny; Pozhikara
- South end: Paravur

Location
- Country: India

Highway system
- Roads in India; Expressways; National; State; Asian

Kollam-Paravur Coastal Road is one of the important city roads currently under construction in Kollam city in Kerala, India. The 14.1-kilometre-long (8.8 mi) road starts at Chinnakada in the north and ends at Paravur town in the south, via Kollam Beach, Mundakkal Beach, Kakkathoppu, Mukkom, Thanni and Pozhikara. Coastal road is considered one of the important roads in Kollam city as it is passing through the suburbs like Kochupilamoodu, Mundakkal, Valathungal and Vadakkumbhagam. It is also known as Eravipuram-Paravur Coastal road.

== Importance ==
Kollam-Paravur Coastal is one of the scenic roads in the state. 90% of this road is passing through the coastal areas of Kollam. As a city road, Kollam-Paravur Coastal road has its own importance as it is acting as a bypass that helps to divert the traffic on the congested Chinnakada-Kottiyam stretch of National Highway-66 passing through the city. In addition to that, the Harbour Engineering Department (HED) of Kerala is planning to make New port road towards Kollam Port as part of this coastal road. So after completion, the road will serve as a coastal bypass for Kollam city.

The Harbour Engineering Department completed the renovation works in Pozhikara-Thanni stretch of coastal road and opened for the public in December 2015. Bus services through coastal road, connecting Paravur with Kollam, has been resumed on 8 July 2016, after a gap of 24 years.

== See also ==
- Roads in Kerala
- Kollam
- Kollam District
- Paravur
