= Kerala State Cashew Development Corporation Limited =

Indian public sector corporation

KSCDC
- Type: Public Sector Corporation
- Industry: Cashew Products
- Founded: July 1969 by P. Ravindran
- Headquarters: Mundakkal, Kollam, Kerala
- Area served: Kerala
- Key people: S. Jayamohan; Chairman; K Sunil John managing director B Sujeendran; Director
- Revenue: Rs. 2.50 billion
- Number of employees: 1500
- Website: cashewcorporation.com

The Kerala State Cashew Development Corporation Limited or KSCDC is a model employer in the field of cashew industry mainly to protect the interest of workers and to provide maximum employment to its workers and to give statutory benefits like minimum wages, bonus, etc. prevailing in the cashew industry. It is headquartered in Kollam city, called "Cashew Capital of the World". The head office is situated at Cashew House, Mundakkal in Kollam City, Kerala. KSCDC was incorporated in July 1969 and started Commercial activities in the year 1971 as a company fully owned by the Government of Kerala. Corporation has now more than a turn over of Rs. 2.50 billion. A Central Export Promotion Council for Cashew, Cashew Export Promotion Council of India (CEPCI) is situated at Kollam city.

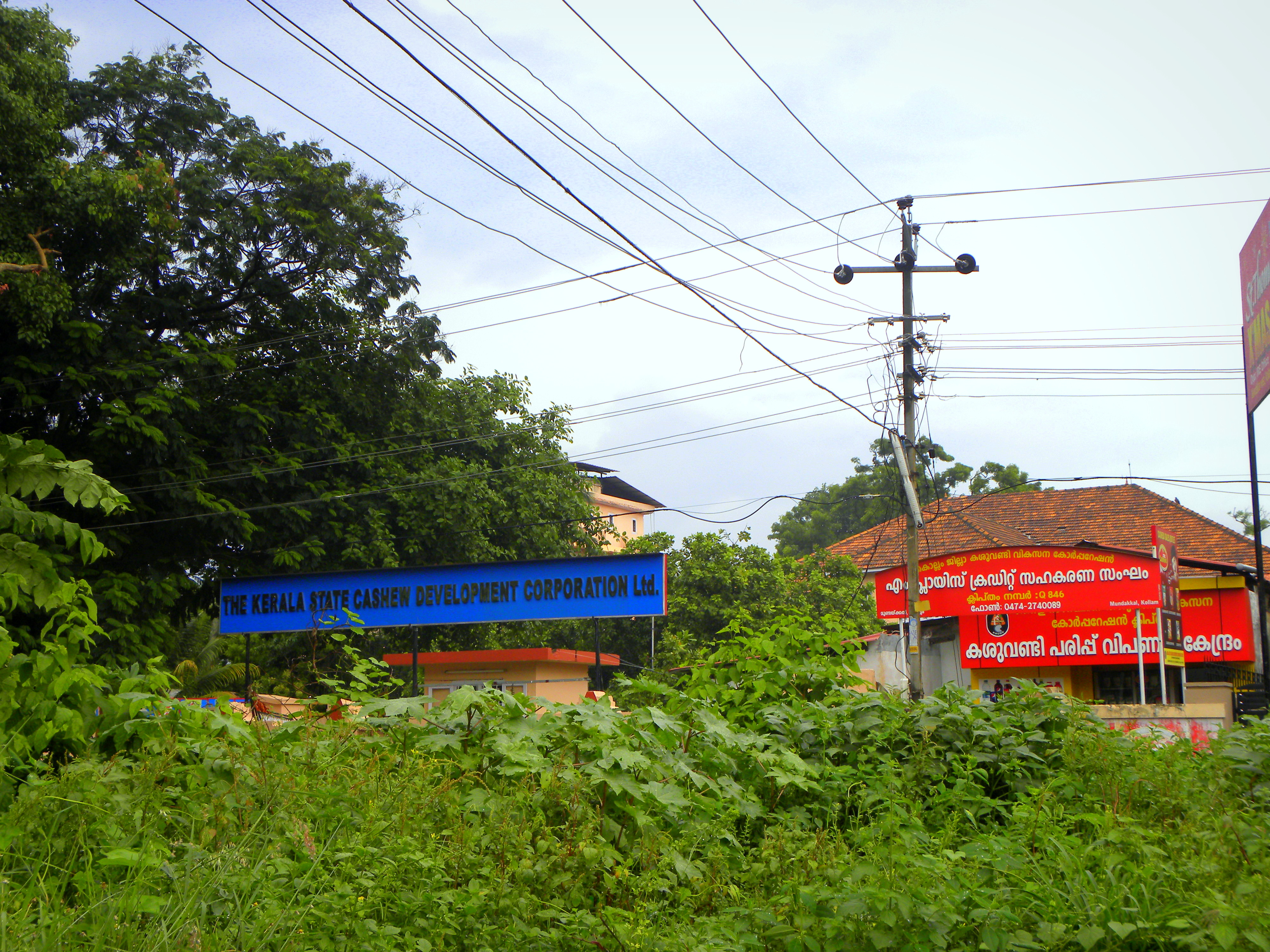
KSCDC Headquarters(Cashew House) in Mundakkal, Kollam city

== Cashew Business in Kollam ==
The industry provides livelihood for about 6–700,000 of employees and farmers, the cashew industry has national importance. In Kollam district alone there are more than 250,000 employees directly involved in the industry, which comes about 10 per cent of the population of the district, out of which 95 per cent are women workers. Kollam is very famous for its traditional Cashew business. More than 600 Cashew Processing Units are there in Kollam. About 800,000 tonnes of raw cashews are imported to Kollam for processing every year. An average of 130,000 tonnes of processed cashews are exported from Kollam to various countries like United States, UAE, Netherlands, Japan, Saudi Arabia, Spain, Germany, Belgium, Singapore, Italy, Greece, Australia, Kuwait, Egypt, Turkey, Jordan, Canada, Thailand, Russia, Norway, Syria, and Hong Kong every year. That is why Kollam is known as the Cashew Capital of the World. CEPCI is expecting a rise in export, i.e. 275,000 tonnes by 2020, a growth of 120 per cent over the present exports.

== Influence of KSCDC over Kerala's Cashew Business ==
To increase the production of indigenous raw nuts, Kerala State Cashew Development Corporation has started Cashew plantations in the State. Corporation has also introduced four value added cashew products in the market. They are regularly signing consignments for more than 6,000 tonnes of raw cashew nut from Guinea-Bissau etc. They are running more than 30 Cashew Processing Factories in Kerala state. Government of Kerala has chartered a vessel between Vallarpadam Terminal and Kollam Port by signing into an agreement with Indian Rare Earths Limited (IREL), Kerala State Cashew Development Corporation, Kerala Minerals and Metals Ltd and various other cashew importers and business giants based out of Kollam city for moving their cargo.

District	No.of KSCDC Owned Cashew Factories
Kollam district	24
Alappuzha district	3
Thiruvananthapuram district	1
Thrissur district	1
Kannur district	1
