= United Electrical Industries Limited =

Indian Electrical Engineering Company

United Electrical Industries Ltd.

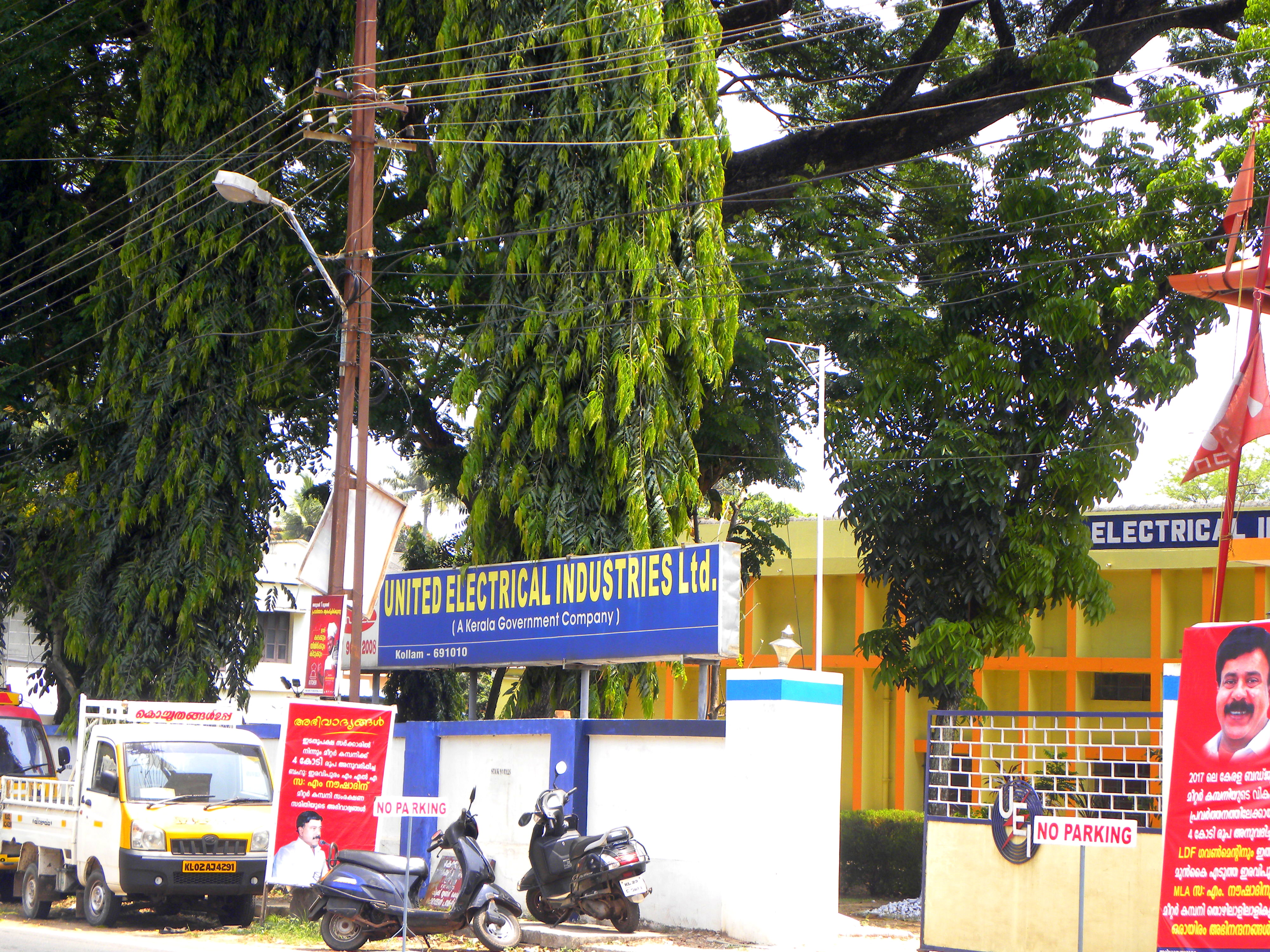
- Type: Public Sector
- Industry: Electrical Equipment Manufacturing
- Founded: 3 October 1950; 75 years ago
- Headquarters: Pallimukku, Kollam, India
- Key people: Binoy Joseph; Chairman; P Aneesh Babu; Managing Director; Swayamprabha K.P; Senior Manager; R Sheeba; Senior Manager
- Products: Air Break Switches, HT/LT Polymer Insulators, Energy Meters, AC Motor Starters, Vehicle tracking system, DOL starter, LED street lights, Multijet Watermeters
- Revenue: ₹ 32.58 Crores; US$ 4.35 million (2019)
- Net income: ₹ 13.63 lakhs US$ 18201.12
- Website: http://unilec.co.in

United Electrical Industries Limited or UNILEC or UEIL (locally known as Meter Company) is an ISO 9001:2015 certified State Level Public Enterprise, operating in the electrical engineering sector since 1950. The company was founded on 3 October 1950 and is situated in the city of Kollam, Kerala. It is the first factory in India to manufacture Electricity House Service Meters. The products of UNILEC Limited are BIS approved with ISI marking. They are producing type tested Energy Meters which are approved in various Test Labs like ERDA - Baroda, ERTL North - Delhi, CPRI - Bangalore, and ETDC - Chennai. The company has a high level of productivity with a monthly production capacity of more than 1 lakh Energy Meters. UNILEC Limited has so far supplied over 40 lakh Electro-mechanical Meters and 50 lakh of Electronic Meters for domestic and industrial purpose. UNILEC is the only Electrical Equipment Manufacturing company in Kerala capable of producing Energy Meters of any specification on bulk basis maintaining quality standards of BIS, IEC etc. The Company also has a R&D Division. now received Govt order for supply and installation of LED lights in all LSGDs of state. In 2019, UNILEC developed Vehicle Location and Tracking device(VLTD) which is an empanelled product of Kerala Motor Vehicle department.

== History ==
United Electrical Industries Limited was the first factory in India to manufacture Electricity House Service Meters. UNILEC started its manufacturing activity during 1950, in technical collaboration with the world-renowned measuring instrument manufacturer Aron Meters Ltd., England. After 7 years, major shares of the company were taken over by the Government of Kerala and reconstituted it as a Public Limited Company under the ownership of Kerala State in 1957. Government of Kerala is holding 97.20% of the total share value of United Electrical Industries Limited.

== Products ==
Major products of the company are Electric Meters and Solar Panels

- 11 kV Air Break Switches.
- Minimast/ Highmast Lights
- LED street Lights
- Solar Street Lights
- Static Energy Meters
- Smart Energy Meters
- Multijet Watermeters
- Mechanical Type Motor Starters- Auto Transformer Starters, Normal Star Delta Starters, Oil Sling Ring Starters
- DOL starters
- Soft Starters
- Vehicle Location and Tracking Device(VLTD)
- Polymer Insulators (HT/LT)-Post, Pin, Disc

United Electrical Industries was chosen by Kozhikode district panchayath to implement their 80 KW solar power project. The first phase of the project will be a 40 KW installation at the district panchayat headquarters.

== Performance Analysis of UNILEC Limited ==
Year	Turnover (in Lakhs)	Profit/Lose (in Lakhs)
1999-2000	1577	272.09 (Profit)
2000-2001	1502	25.54 (Profit)
2001-2002	1837	338.78 (Profit)
2002-2003	1231	150.91 (Loss)
2003-2004	1006	322.16 (Loss)
2004-2005	708	285 (Loss)
2005-2006	497	312 (Loss)
2006-2007	3508	237 (Profit)
2007-2008	3884	60.76 (Profit)
2008-2009	4260	44.54 (Profit)
2019-2020	3258	13.63(Profit)

== Modernization ==
The company is on the stage of modernization. As part of that, UNILEC has started producing double-jet water meters. They have started the production of LCD energy meters in 2014. On the basis of this development, the company is now preparing to take part in KSEB’s tender process for supply of energy meters. Government of Kerala has proposed a plan to manufacture LED lights in association with United Electrical Industries Limited. They have a plan to start a smart card manufacturing unit in the company.

In 2018, Government of Kerala has decided to equip UNILEC to become the first Kerala public sector company going to have smart meter technology. Three new wings would be setting up at UNILEC as part of modernization; LED street light production unit, renovated water meter manufacturing unit, and a research and development department.
