= Chavara =

- Suburb & Block
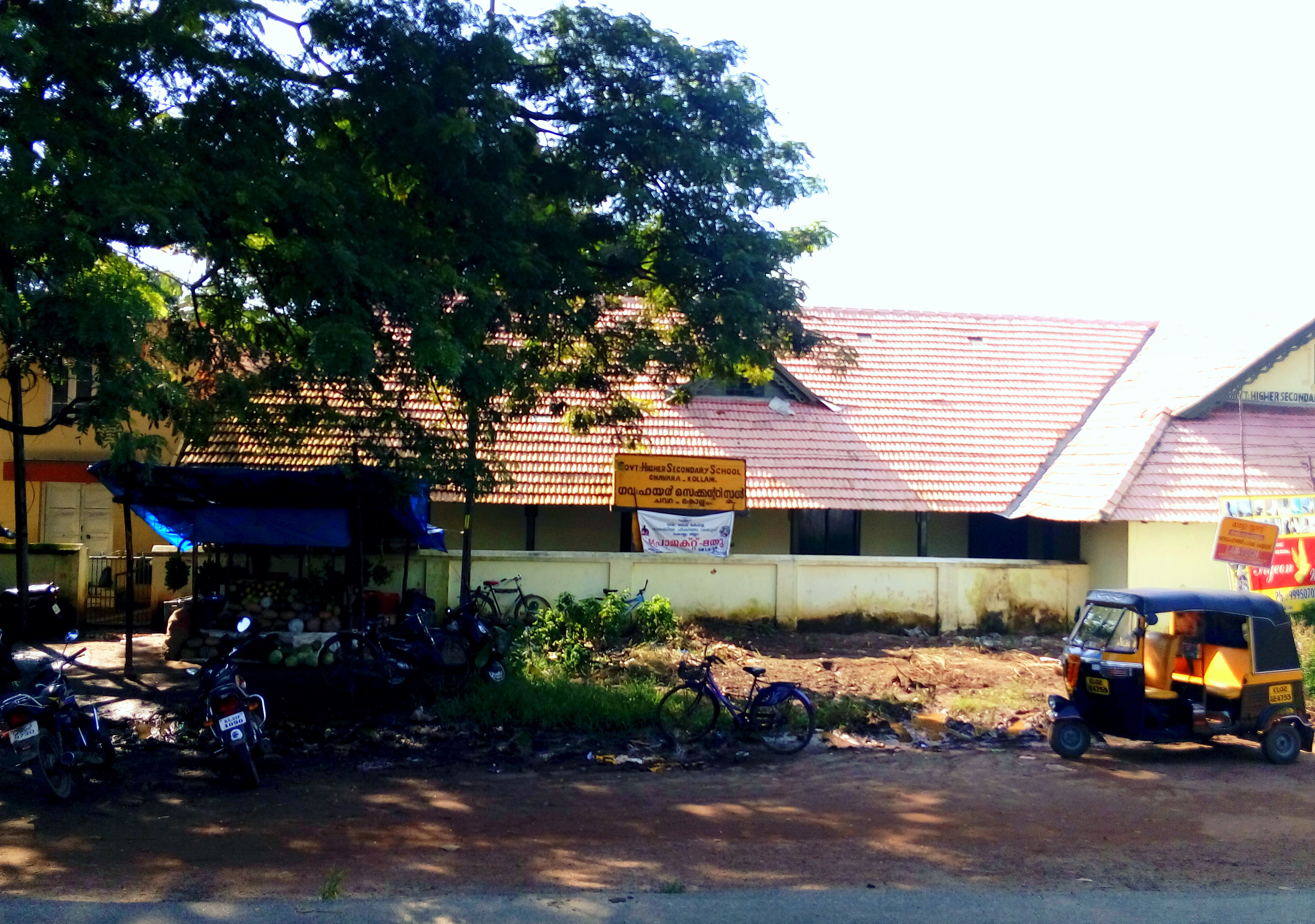
- Govt. HSS, Chavara

- Location in Kerala, India
- Coordinates: 8.9952900°N 76.532880°E
- Country: India
- State: Kerala
- District: Kollam

Language
  - Official: Malayalam, English
- Time zone: UTC+5:30 (IST)
- Pincode: 691583
- Telephone code: 476
- Vehicle registration: KL-23
- Nearest city: Kollam
- Lok Sabha constituency: Kollam

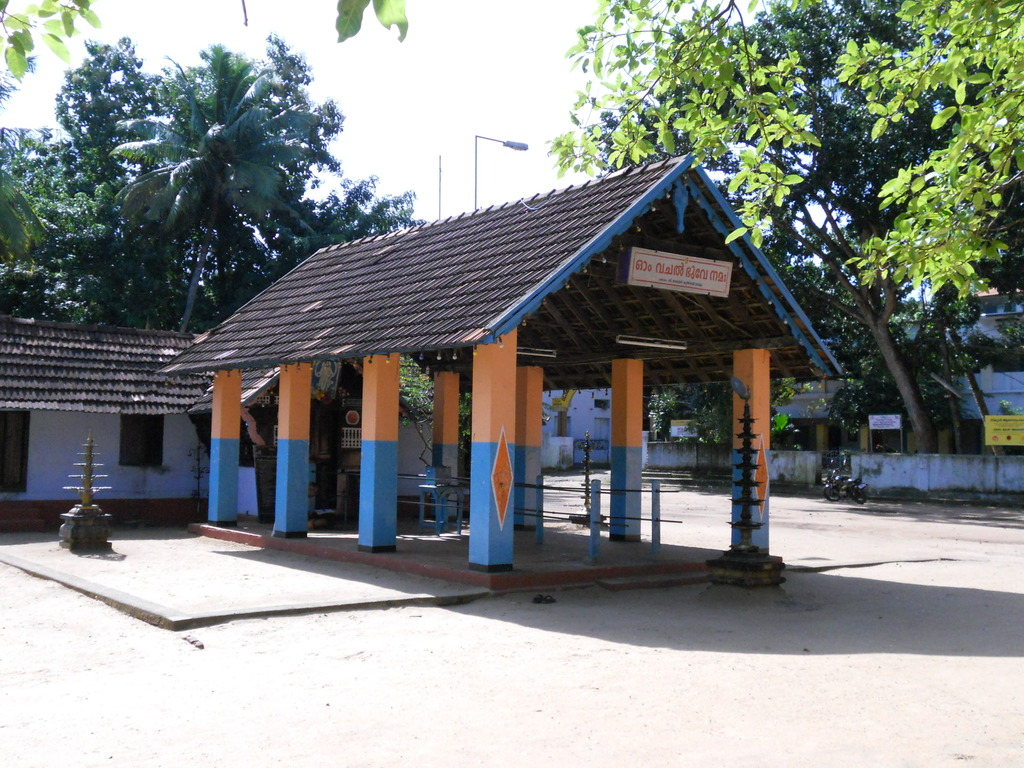
Guhananda Puram temple

Chavara is a village in Karunagappally taluk, Kollam district, Kerala, India. It is a part of Kollam Lok Sabha constituency.

== Location and tourism ==
Chavara is situated on the shores of the Arabian Sea and the major freshwater lake in Kerala, Ashtamudi, which flows through it. Chavara has many lakes and lagoons including Sasthamkota Lake. Popular tourist destinations are Kattil Mekkathil Devi Temple, St. Andrew's Church, Kovilthottam, Kottankulangara Devi Temple, Kovilthottam Lighthouse as well as the area around Ashtamudi lake.

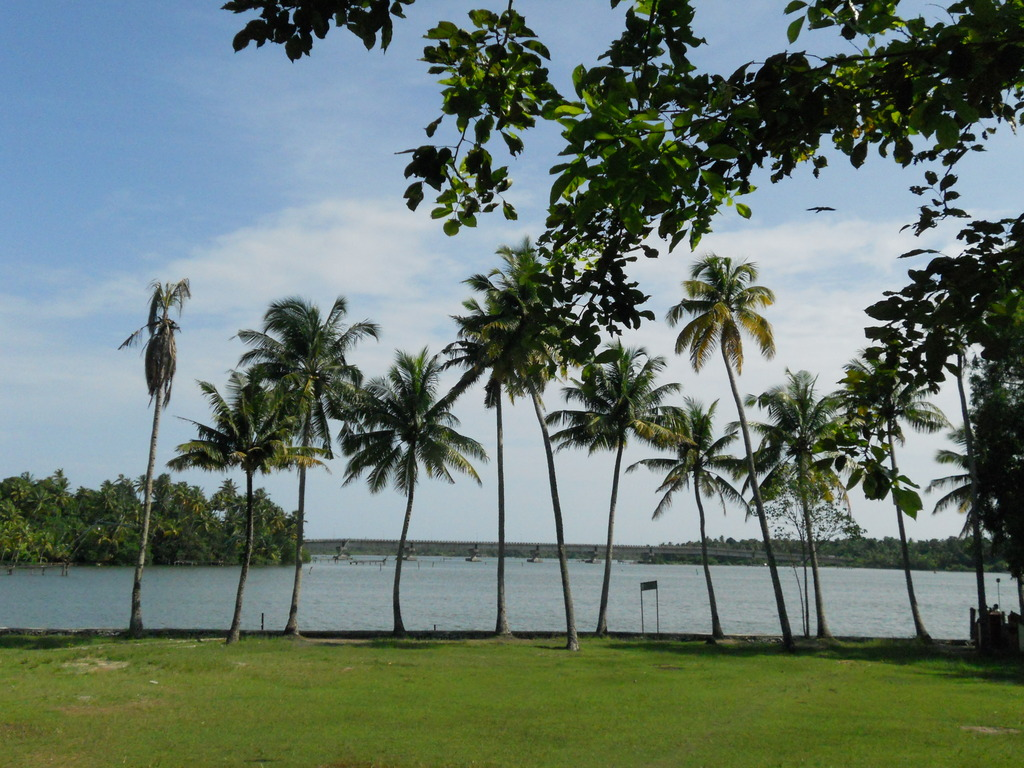
Chavara Thekkumbhagom backwaters

Some important areas around Ashtamudi lake in Chavara are Kurishumoodu, the Old Portuguese cross, Karattal kadavu, TS canal, Idathuruthu and fisherman colony, Koyivila boat jetty, Arinallor Kadavu and Cherikadavu backwater.

== Industries ==
The village has a high supply of rare-earth elements in its sand, mainly titanium on its beaches. The major industries in the public sector at Chavara that deal with the mining and processing of rare-earth metals are Kerala Minerals and Metals Limited (KMML) and Indian Rare Earths Limited (IRE).

For the processing of titanium, India's first Titanium Sponge Plant (TSP) was developed by KMML in association with DMRL under DRDO and the project was funded by VSSC under ISRO. The plant was inaugurated in 2011 by the then Defense Minister of India, AK Antony.

Kerala Premo Pipes a govt company (under KWA) in Chavara has been lying closed for the past 18 years. The Premo pipe factory started production in 1961 and closed in 1997 following adverse market conditions. Though an MOU was signed between KWA and HLL in 2011 for starting PVC pipes, it is yet to be materialized.

== Notable people ==
- O. N. V. Kurup, Malayalam poet and lyricist
- V. Sambasivan, Kathaprasangam artist
- Baby John, politician
- Shibu Baby John, politician
- B. Ravi Pillai, businessman
- Kalaranjini, actress
- Kalpana, actress
- Urvashi, actress
- Ambili Devi, Malayalam film actress
- Chavara Parukutty Amma, artiste of the Kathakali dance drama
