= Kerala Small Industries Development Corporation Limited =

State agency of Kerala, India

- Kerala SIDCO logo
- Abbreviation: SIDCO
- Formation: 1975
- Type: Governmental
- Headquarters: Santhinagar, Thiruvananthapuram, Kerala, India
- Website: keralasidco.com

Kerala Small Industries Development Corporation Limited (Kerala SIDCO) is a state agency of Kerala, India, established for the promotion of small scale industries in the state of Kerala. It works in association with the National Small Industries Development Corporation. Apart from acting as the dispenser of government subsidies for starting a new small scale industry, the Kerala SIDCO provides technical assistance, training, and also connects up the aspirant industrialists to suppliers of raw materials as well as machinery.

Kerala SIDCO operates Industrial Parks, Industrial Estates, and Mini Industrial Estates in all the 14 districts of Kerala.

== See also ==
- Ministry of Small Scale Industries
- Ministry of Micro, Small and Medium Enterprises
