= Jammu and Kashmir State Industrial Development Corporation =

- Jammu and Kashmir State Industrial Development Corporation Limited
- JKSIDCO logo
- Abbreviation: JKSIDCO
- Website: https://jksidco.org/

Jammu and Kashmir State Industrial Development Corporation Ltd (J&K SIDCO) is the agency of the Government of Jammu and Kashmir responsible for undertaking infrastructural development, trading activities and development banking. It was set up in 1969. It is engaged in development of infrastructure of industrial complexes and estates and growth centres, food processing zones and software technology parks.
