= Parvathy Mills =

Indian textile company

Parvathy Mills Ltd.
- Type: Public Sector
- Industry: Textile industry
- Founded: Chinnakada, Downtown Kollam, India (1884)
- Headquarters: Kollam (Quilon), India
- Products: Textile
- Number of employees: 120

A.D.Cotton or Parvathi Mills Limited is a textile manufacturing company located in Kollam city, India, owned by the National Textile Corporation (NTC). The company was founded in 1884 by British entrepreneur A. D. Cotton.

After Indian independence, the mill was operated on lease by a Tamil entrepreneur, while the land was owned by the Kerala State Textile Corporation. It was later transferred to the National Textile Corporation. The company employed about 120 workers, including six NTC staff members and 17 casual workers. The plant has remained closed since 2008 pending modernization. However, there is demand to build a bird sanctuary connected to backwaters.

== History ==
His Highness Visakham Thirunal Rama Varma, the then Maharaja of Travancore took the initiative to start a spinning mill in Quilon city (now known as Kollam), which was then the business capital of Travancore along the Malabar Coast. He donated the land to start the AD Cotton Mill in 1884. The land was handed over to National Textile Corporation in 1974.

The NTC planned to privatize Parvathy Mills in 2005. The plant was added by the Board for Industrial and Financial Reconstruction, which had listed it for revival in 2002. The plan was dropped after protests by the Parvathy Mills Workers Union.

Along with many other mills in Mumbai, Coimbatore, Ahmedabad, Aurangabad, Akola, Nanded, Naini, Jaipur and Udaipur, Parvathy Mill was slated for redevelopment and modernisation in 2007 and 2012. To date, these improvements have not taken place, and the mill has been closed since 2008. As per the market rates in 2019, the total land value of Parvathy Mill would be more than ₹500 crore (US$52 million). The defunct mill's machinery has already become outdated and rusted beyond revival.

=== Demands for the mill's land to start a medical college ===
Representatives from Kollam, along with organizations, staged a dharna and march in February 2014 to try to obtain the Parvathy Mill land as the site for a government medical college. The mill is on 16.40 acres of prime city land valued at more than Rs. 4 billion (US$64 million) as per the market value of 2014. As of December 2014, administrative delays in deciding on a site and obtaining land continue to delay the start of construction of the new college.
