= Kottankulangara Devi Temple =

Hindu temple in Kerala, India

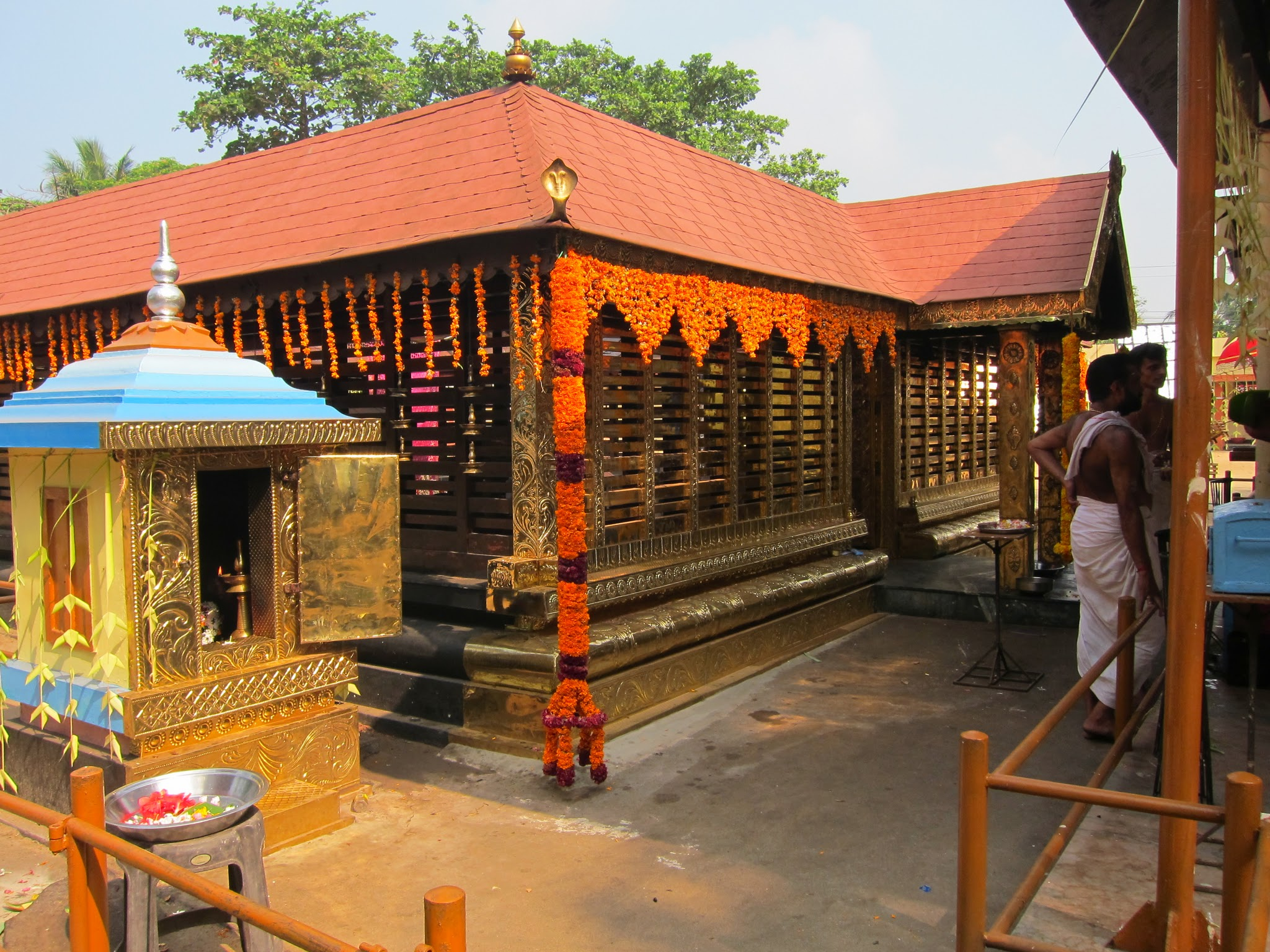

- Kottankulangara Devi Temple, Chavara, Kollam, Kerala

Religion
- Affiliation: Hinduism
- District: Kollam
- Deity: Goddess Durga Bhagavathy or Aadi Shakthi
- Festival: Chamayavilakku

Location
- Location: Chavara
- State: Kerala
- Country: India
- Interactive map of Kottankulangara Devi Temple
- Coordinates: 8.97958°N 76.53512°E

Specifications
- Temple: One
- Elevation: 31.65 m (104 ft)

Website
- http://kottankulangaratemple.org

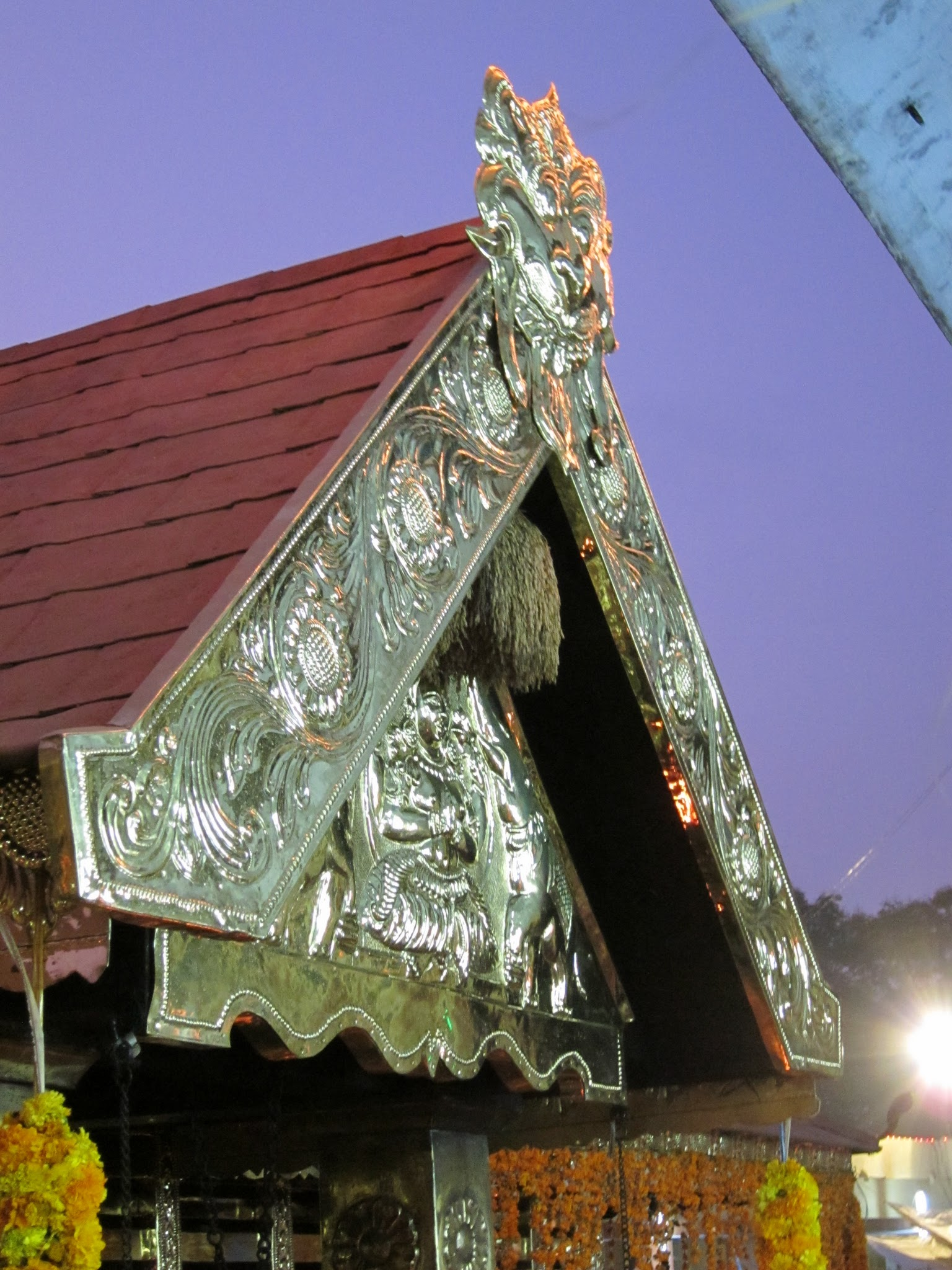
View of the Temple facade

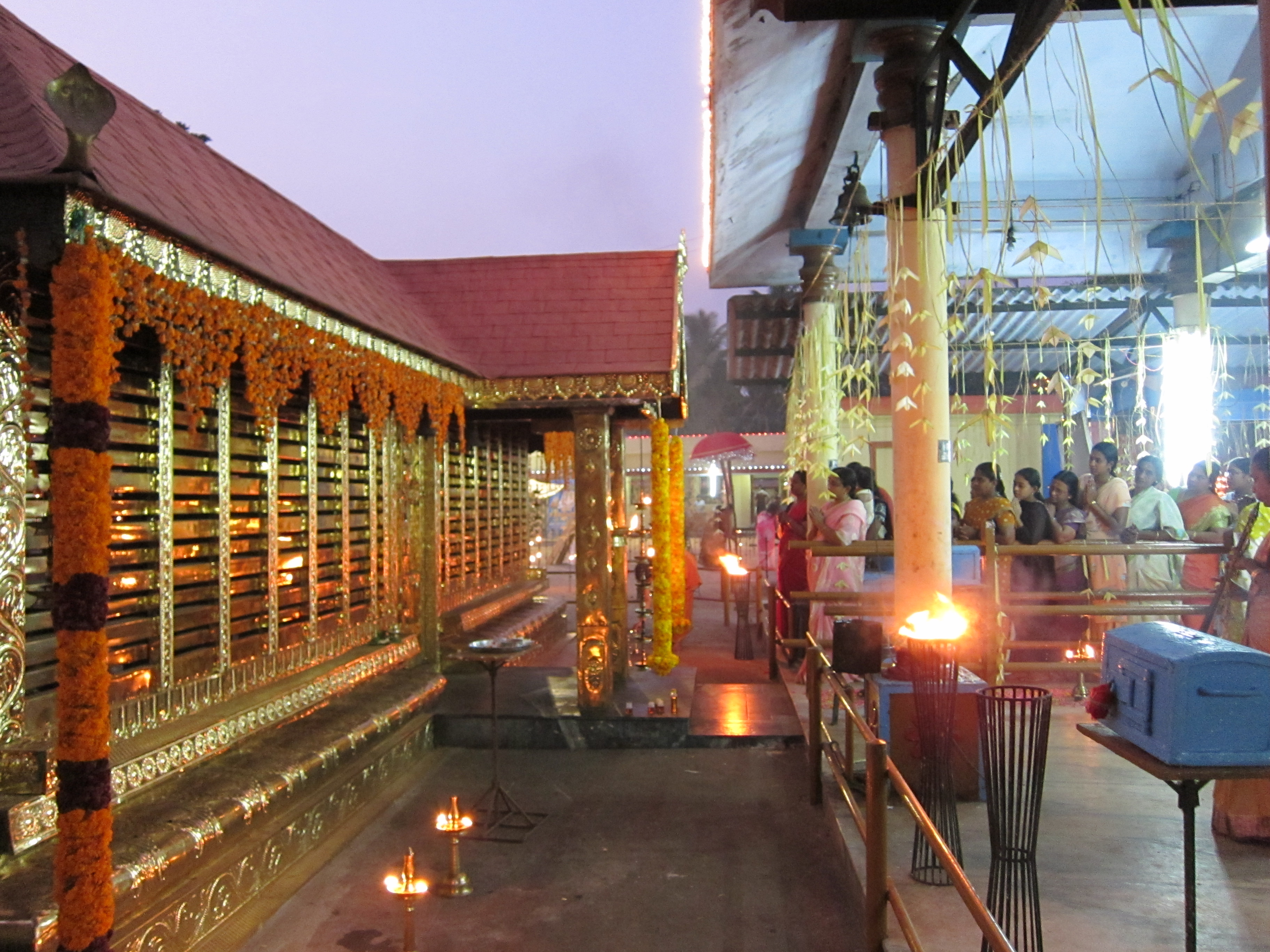
Devotees entering the Temple

The Kottankulangara Devi Temple is a Hindu temple to the goddess Durga Bhagavathy or Aadi Shakthi, the supreme mother of power, located in the village of Chavara, Kerala, India.

== Early history ==
The plot of land where the temple is situated was once part of a forest, a tranquil area surrounded by a thick growth of trees, plants and creepers. On the northwest corner of the plot there existed a small deep pond known as Bhoothakulam. People living in the area believed it was a shelter for poisonous snakes. On the eastern side there was a huge extensive deep pond. During days of rain, a stream originated from there making the surrounding area fertile and cultivable. As this place was full of grass and pure water, the cow-herders from the neighbouring area would congregate there with their cattle.

=== Legend ===
According to the legend, a group of cow-herders got a coconut from this place. They found a stone on the southern part of Bhoothakulam. When they hit the coconut on the stone (intending to remove the husk), they found drops of blood dripping from the stone. They explained the phenomena to the elders. The astrologer suggested that the stone contained supernatural powers and poojas should be started immediately after constructing a temple. The elders and cow-herders constructed a temporary temple using poles, leaves and tender leaves of coconut palm. It was a custom in ancient days that balikas used to prepare flower garlands, lit the pooja lamps in ancient Kudumba temples. Accepting this tradition, the cow-herders wearing female attire, offered poojas in the temple. The milky liquid prepared from coconut kernel was boiled, the medicinal oil (Urukku Velichenna) extracted and solid substance taken (Kottan) was offered to the goddess as Naivedyam.

== Festivals ==
=== Chamayavilakku ===
The Kottankulangara Festival (or Kottankulangara Chamayavilakku) is held annually at the temple in which men from across the state and now even outside it dress in female attire. The cross-dressing is part of traditional ritual festivities and at night they hold traditional lamps and walk in procession to the temple to the accompaniment of a traditional orchestra. Devotees visit the temple to seek the blessings of the goddess.

=== Kuruthola Pandal ===
In order to commemorate the legend and origin of the temple, the model of the ancient temple is being constructed every year. The devotees stand long lines from Kunjalummoodu to Arattukadavu at the time of Devi's journey from Kunjalummoodu. Seeing this spiritual procession, the devotees derive an unlimited amount of spiritual joy and believe this sight would help them all to have comfort and mental pleasure and be redressed from the unforeseen miseries of life.

=== Jeevatha Ezhunnallathu ===
Jeevatha Ezunnallathu is mostly in Devi temples. Wearing traditional dress ("Thattudukkal") and with towels firmly tied at the waist and on the head, they carry the Jeevatha on their shoulders and perform the step-dance. The myth behind Jeevatha Ezhunnallathu is The goddess visit her devotes and devotes offering Anpara, Ezhu para to Devi for blessing.

== See also ==
- Temples of Kerala
- LGBT topics and Hinduism
