= Mundakkal =

Mundakkal Mundackal
- Neighbourhood
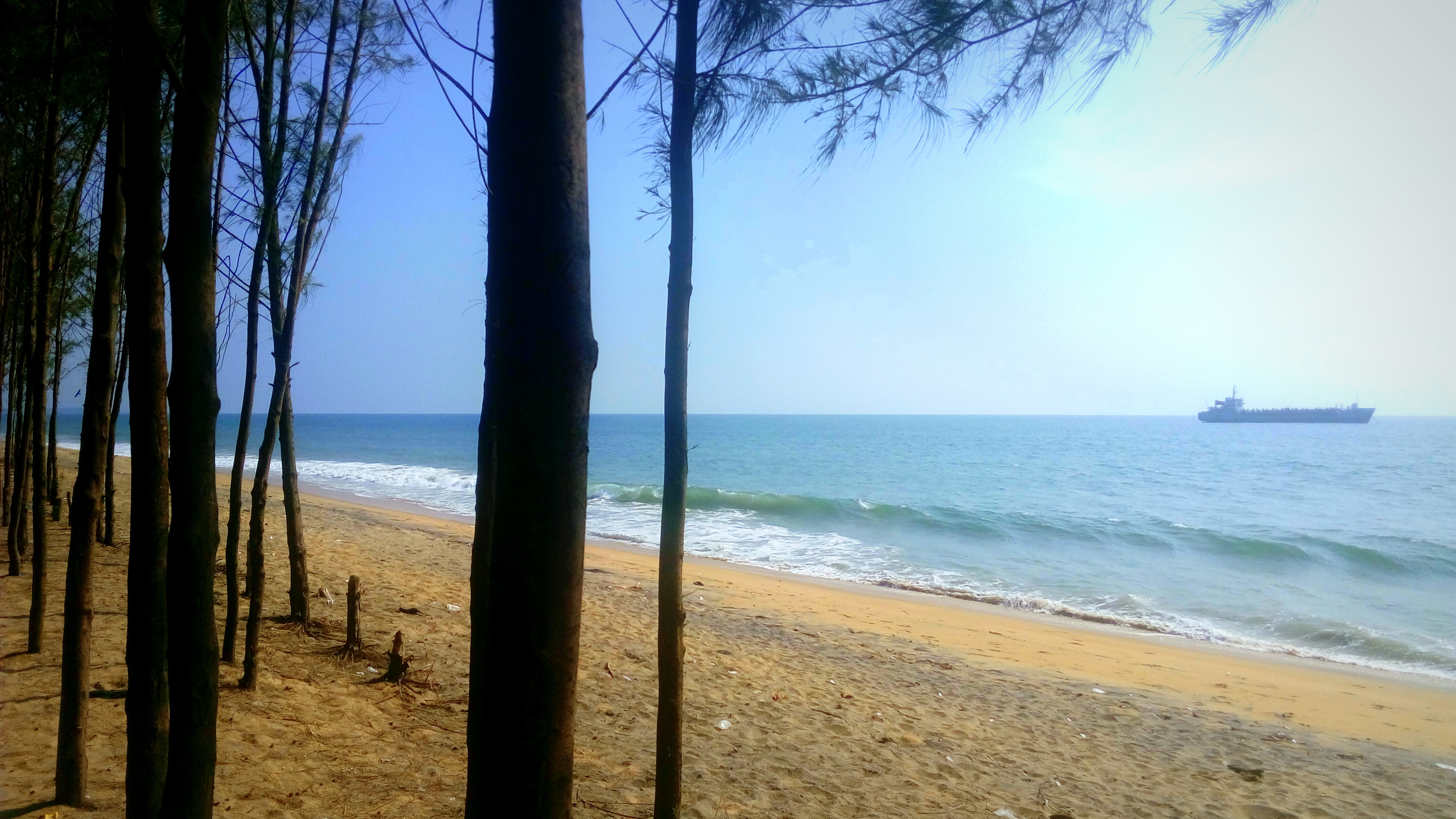
- Mundakkal Coast in Kollam city

- Location in Kollam, India Mundakkal (Kerala) Mundakkal (India)
- Coordinates: 8.875515°N 76.599145°E
- Country: India
- State: Kerala
- District: Kollam

Government
  - Type: Mayor–Council
  - Body: Kollam Municipal Corporation
  - Mayor: A.K Hafeez (INC)
  - MP: N.K Premachandran
  - MLA: Bindu Krishna
  - District Collector: Devidas N IAS
  - City Police Commissioner: Kiran Narayanan IPS

Languages
  - Official: Malayalam, English
- Time zone: UTC+5:30 (IST)
- PIN: 691010
- Vehicle registration: KL-02
- Lok Sabha constituency: Kollam
- Civic agency: Kollam Municipal Corporation
- Avg. summer temperature: 34 °C (93 °F)
- Avg. winter temperature: 22 °C (72 °F)
- Website: http://www.kollam.nic.in

Mundakkal, also spelt Mundackal, is an important residential area and industrial hub situated in the city of Kollam, Kerala, India. The place is considered as the capital of India's cashew processing activities. Kerala State Cashew Development Corporation Limited(KSCDC) and Cashew Export Promotion Council of India(CEPCI) are headquartered at Mundakkal in Kollam city. It is an important tourist place in the city and a part of Downtown Kollam which gained in significance because of the presence of a flourishing beach. During 'Karkidaka Vavubali', thousands of devotees arrive on the beach to perform the Vavubali Tharpanam. Vavubali is an important ritual observed by Hindus in Kerala in the month of Karkidakam. The ritual involves people offering Bali to the departed souls. The ritual is performed by men, women, and children.

== History ==
Mundakkal is closely associated with local historical traditions and the etymological interpretations linked to ancient Buddhist Heritage. The place name Mundakkal is derived from Munda (meaning, a shaved or bald head - a reference to Buddhist monks) and kal (meaning, stone or rock in Malayalam or Tamil language). Historically, this coastal place of former Quilon, now administratively come under Kollam Corporation, served as an important center for international maritime trade and flourished as a major hub for Buddhism from approximately the 3rd century BCE and 12th century BCE

== Location ==
- Kollam Junction railway station - 3.3 km
- Andamukkam City Bus Stand - 3.7 km
- Kollam KSRTC Bus Station - 5 km
- Kollam Port - 4.9 km
- Chinnakada - 4.2 km
- Thangassery - 5.5 km
- Paravur railway station - 19.5 km

== Importance of Mundakkal ==
Mundakkal is a very important place for Kollam city as so many important institutions and tourism centres in the city are situated in and around Mundakkal. Mundakkal Beach, Cashew Export Promotion Council of India(CEPC), Kerala State Cashew Development Corporation Ltd.(KSCDC), SIDCO Industrial Estate & raw material depot. etc. are situated at Mundakkal.

=== Kerala State Cashew Development Corporation Limited ===
The Kerala State Cashew Development Corporation Limited(KSCDC) is a model employer in the field of cashew industry mainly to protect the interest of workers and to provide maximum employment to its workers and to give statutory benefits like minimum wages, bonus, etc. prevailing in the cashew industry. It is headquartered in Kollam city - The Cashew Capital of the World. The head office is situated at Cashew House, Mundakkal in Kollam City, Kerala. KSCDC was incorporated in July 1969 and started Commercial activities in the year 1971 as a company fully owned by the Government of Kerala. Corporation has now more than a turn over of Rs. 250 crores.

=== Cashew Export Promotion Council of India ===
Cashew Export Promotion Council of India(CEPC) was established by the Government of India in the year 1955, with the active cooperation of the cashew industry with the object of promoting exports of cashew kernels and cashew nut shell liquid from India. It is headquartered in Mundakkal, Kollam in the state of Kerala - Cashew Capital of the World. The Council serves as an intermediary between importers of Cashew Kernels and exporters who are members of the council. The council is also supposed to deal with any disputes on exports/imports arising on account of quality standards, breach of contractual obligations, etc. It undertakes numerous activities, such as organizing global buyer-seller meets, organizing studies on the nutritional aspects of cashew and providing support to cashew processors and exporters for improving infrastructure.

=== Mundakkal Beach ===
Mundakkal Beach is an important beach in Kollam city located about 3 kilometres (1.9 mi) from Chinnakada, the city centre. The beach is one of the 25 potential beaches for tourism development in Kerala. Other major beaches in the district include Paravur Thekkumbhagam, Pozhikara, Kollam Beach and Thirumullavaram, which are all close by.

=== Mundakkal Industrial Estate ===
Kerala SIDCO is running an Industrial estate in Mundakkal. Pieces of land, with power and water supply and other infrastructure, have been divided into individual sites. The sites make up industrial estates, part of the government's initiative to develop the small and medium enterprise sector and address the issue of unemployment

=== Urban primary health centre ===
An experimental venture was done by National Urban Health Mission in mid-2014. It's focus was to aid civilians and the people in nearby poor homes in Mundakkal. This health centre is located just near Thumpara temple.

== See also ==
- Kollam
- Mundakkal Beach
- Kollam Beach
- Chinnakada
- Andamukkam City Bus Stand
- Kadappakada
- Asramam Maidan
