= Titanium Sponge Plant =

Indian manufacturing plant

Titanium Sponge Plant is an Indian manufacturing plant that produces titanium sponge, a material widely used in aeronautics, light defence vehicles, and other applications. It is located at Kerala Minerals and Metals Ltd (KMML), Chavara, Kollam district of Kerala. Notably, It is the only plant in the world that carries out the entire aerospace-grade titanium sponge manufacturing process under one roof.

== History ==
The importance of establishing domestic titanium production was realised due to India's significant demand for titanium and magnesium alloys, which were predominantly imported from countries such as China, Russia, and Japan. Dr. APJ Abdul Kalam, a scientist and the former President of India, highlighted the issue in a speech at the Kerala Legislative Assembly. The plant was fully commissioned in August 2015.

== Establishment ==
The successful implementation was achieved after about twenty years of continuous research by the Defence Metallurgical Research Laboratory (DMRL under DRDO). The project is funded by Vikram Sarabhai Space Centre (VSSC under ISRO).

== Ranking ==
India is the seventh country in the world to have such a complex structured TSP which has the technology to make titanium sponge, and the first to have done the entire process under one roof in an indigenous manner. The company, Kerala Minerals and Metals Ltd. (KMML), has also won awards for commercialising this technology.

== Design and capacity ==
The plant has an intricate design to carry out manufacturing of titanium alloy wrought products and fabrication of hardware. Titanium sponge is an alloy product that is produced through the Kroll process, which includes leaching or heated vacuum distillation to make the metal almost 99.7% pure.

Work is being done actively to increase the capacity of the TSP (Titanium Sponge Plant) for the proposed 10000 TPY (Tons Per Year). A memorandum of understanding has also been signed by the KMML with Steel Authority of India (SAIL) for a joint venture to prepare titanium sponge at large scale.

India has the third-largest reserves of Titanium containing minerals and was the sixth-largest country in Titanium production in 2013. However, the high purity Titanium sponge (defined as containing at least 99.7% Titanium) as raw material is still imported for aerospace applications from countries like Japan, Russia, and China. Using the indigenously made titanium sponge, VSSC realized the aerospace-grade alloy, having formula Ti_{6}Al_{4}V, at Mishra Dhatu Nigam (Midhani) in Hyderabad.

== Future prospects ==
Proposals for future work include magnesium recovery from MgCl_{2} (magnesium chloride) to set up an additional facility on similar lines, as well as to expand titanium production capacity from 500 MT to 1000 MT.
