= Kerala Minerals and Metals =

Titanium dioxide manufacturing company in Kollam, India

Kerala Minerals and Metals Ltd.
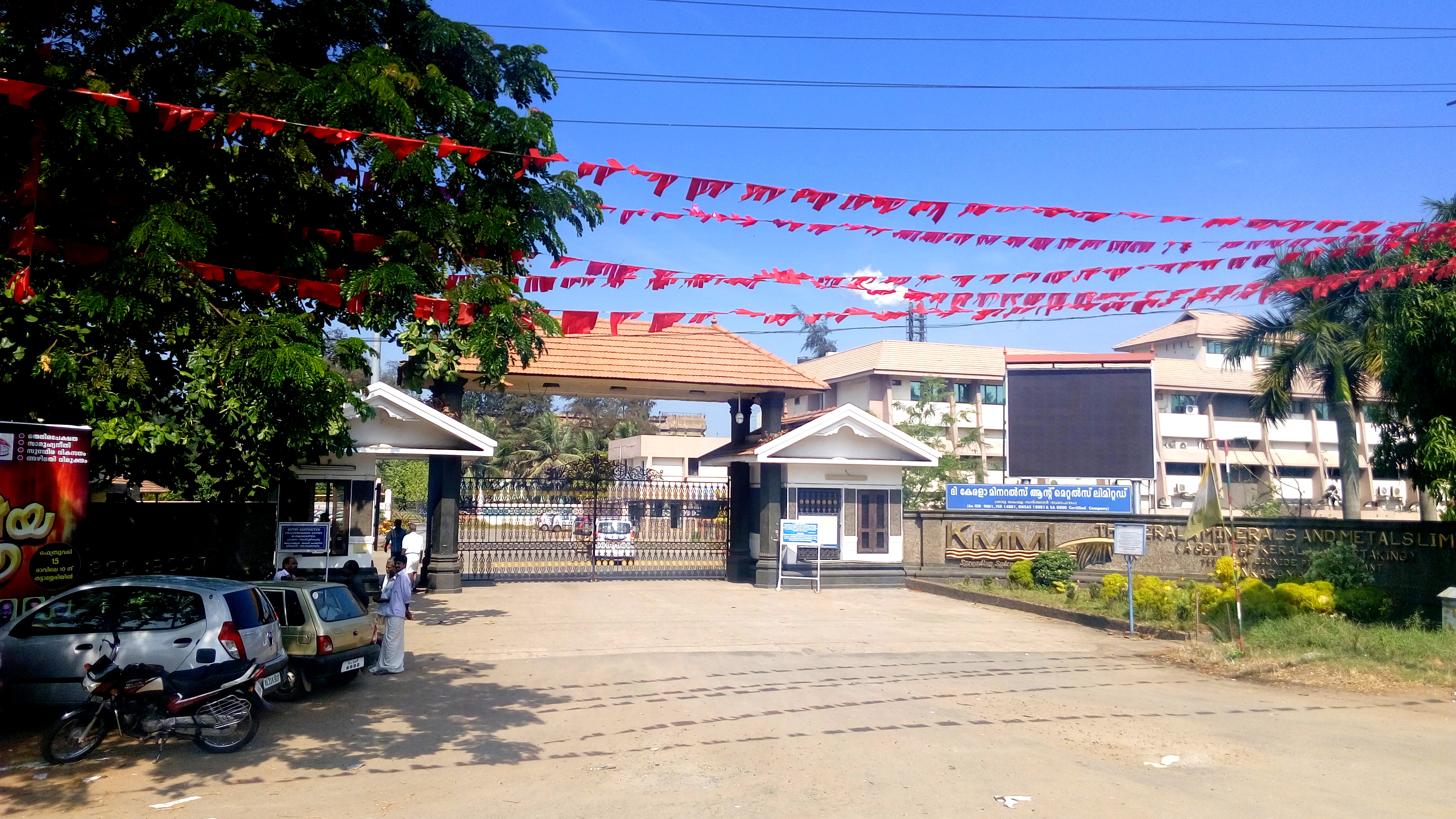
- Entrance of KMML, Kollam
- Type: Public Sector
- Industry: Mining
- Founded: 1932; 94 years ago Kollam, India
- Founder: F. X. Perira
- Headquarters: Kollam(Quilon), India
- Key people: P Pradeep (Managing Director); Ajayakrishnan V (General Manager)
- Products: Titanium Dioxide; Titanium Sponge; Titanium Pigment
- Revenue: ▲US$108.72 million (2022-23)
- Net income: ▲US$12.5 million (2022-23)
- Number of employees: ~2000
- Website: kmml.com

Kerala Minerals and Metals Ltd is an integrated titanium dioxide manufacturing public sector undertaking in Kollam, Kerala, India. Its operations comprise mining, mineral separation, synthetic rutile and pigment-production plants. Apart from producing rutile-grade titanium dioxide pigment for various types of industries, it also produces other products like ilmenite, rutile, zircon, sillimanite, synthetic rutile etc. It is one of the best performing Public Sector Units in India. The company manufactures titanium dioxide through the chloride route. The different grades are produced by KMML under the brand name KEMOX.

== History ==
The history of the beaches of Sankaramangalam and nearby areas is linked with the history of the KMML. The rare-earth minerals made the beach an area of scientific interest. The discovery process for this huge Indian deposit was accidentally initiated in the year 1909 when C. W. Schomberg, a German chemist, identified the presence of monazite in the sand remnants of contaminants of coir imported from Kerala. Encouraged by the great demand in those days for thorium oxide in gas mantle, Schomberg established the first plant at Manavalakurichi (MK) in 1910 for separation of monazite and later another plant at Chavara. Subsequent to the arrest of Schomberg on charges of being a German spy during the First World War, both his plants at Manavalakurichi and Chavara were closed down.

The London Cosmopolitan Mineral Company established in the year 1914 in London took over these plants and continued operations. In 1920, Hopkins and Williams (H & W), yet another London based English Company started operation at MK and Chavara. The first export of ilmenite from Chavara took place in the year 1922 and the Indian ilmenite maintained a virtual monopoly in the world market as basic raw material for titania pigment (white) till 1940 when four plants belonging to Travancore Minerals Ltd (TMC), Hopkins & William Travancore Ltd (H&W) and Fx Pereira & Sons (FXP) together exported as high as three hundred thousand tons of ilmenite from Chavara.

By 1932, a private entrepreneur established the F. X. Perira and Sons (Travancore) Pvt. Ltd, the forerunner to KMML. Ownership of the company subsequently changed hands three times, after which in 1956 it was taken over by the state government and placed under the control of the industries department. The unit was subsequently converted as a limited company in 1972 by the name of 'The Kerala Minerals and Metals Ltd.' with the objectives of better utilisation of mineral wealth found along the sea coast of Kollam and Alappuzha Districts, generation of growth and employment in the state in general and the local area in particular.

The construction of titanium dioxide pigment using chloride technology began in 1979, and was commissioned in 1984 as the first and only integrated titanium dioxide plant in the world.

Today the company has over 1600 employees and a range of products.

== Supply of Titanium Sponge to Defence Ministry units of India and Dept of Space ==
KMML in Kollam is the sole producer-cum-supplier of Titanium sponge in India. This institution has recorded 94.5% rise in Quarterly profit recently. Defence Ministry unit in India requires more than 1,500 tonnes of TS annually. The Department of Space in collaboration with KMML has set up a 500 tonne per annum (TPA) titanium sponge plant in Kollam KMML premises to meet their annual requirement of 2,000 tonnes. They have fully commissioned their Titanium sponge plant recently at Kollam KMML.

== Revenue ==
Revenue
Financial Year	Turnover	Net Profit
2015-16	₹653.91 crore (US$68 million)	₹3.24 crore (US$340,000)
2016–17	₹727.04 crore (US$75 million)	₹40.37 crore (US$4.2 million)
2017–18	₹740.58 crore (US$77 million)	₹181.11 crore (US$19 million)
2018-19	₹829.89 crore (US$86 million)	₹163.29 crore (US$17 million)
2019-20	--	₹42 crore (US$4.4 million)
2020-21	₹783 crore (US$81 million)	₹112 crore (US$12 million)
2021-22	₹1,058 crore (US$110 million)	₹332.20 crore (US$34 million)
2022-23	₹896.40 crore (US$93 million)	₹103.58 crore (US$11 million)
2023-24	--	₹85.04 crore (US$8.8 million)
2024-25	--	₹107.67 crore (US$11 million)

== Oxygen plant ==
An oxygen plant with a production capacity of 70 tonnes, including medical oxygen production capacity of 6 to 7 tonnes per day, is commissioned at KMML in October 2020. They were spending ₹12 crores per annum before, buying oxygen from other manufacturers. Now the plant is supplying oxygen to COVID-19 treatment centers and hospitals in Kerala and other neighboring states also. As of April 2021, it has supplied over 1,100 tonnes of liquid oxygen to various agencies.
