= Beaches in Kerala =

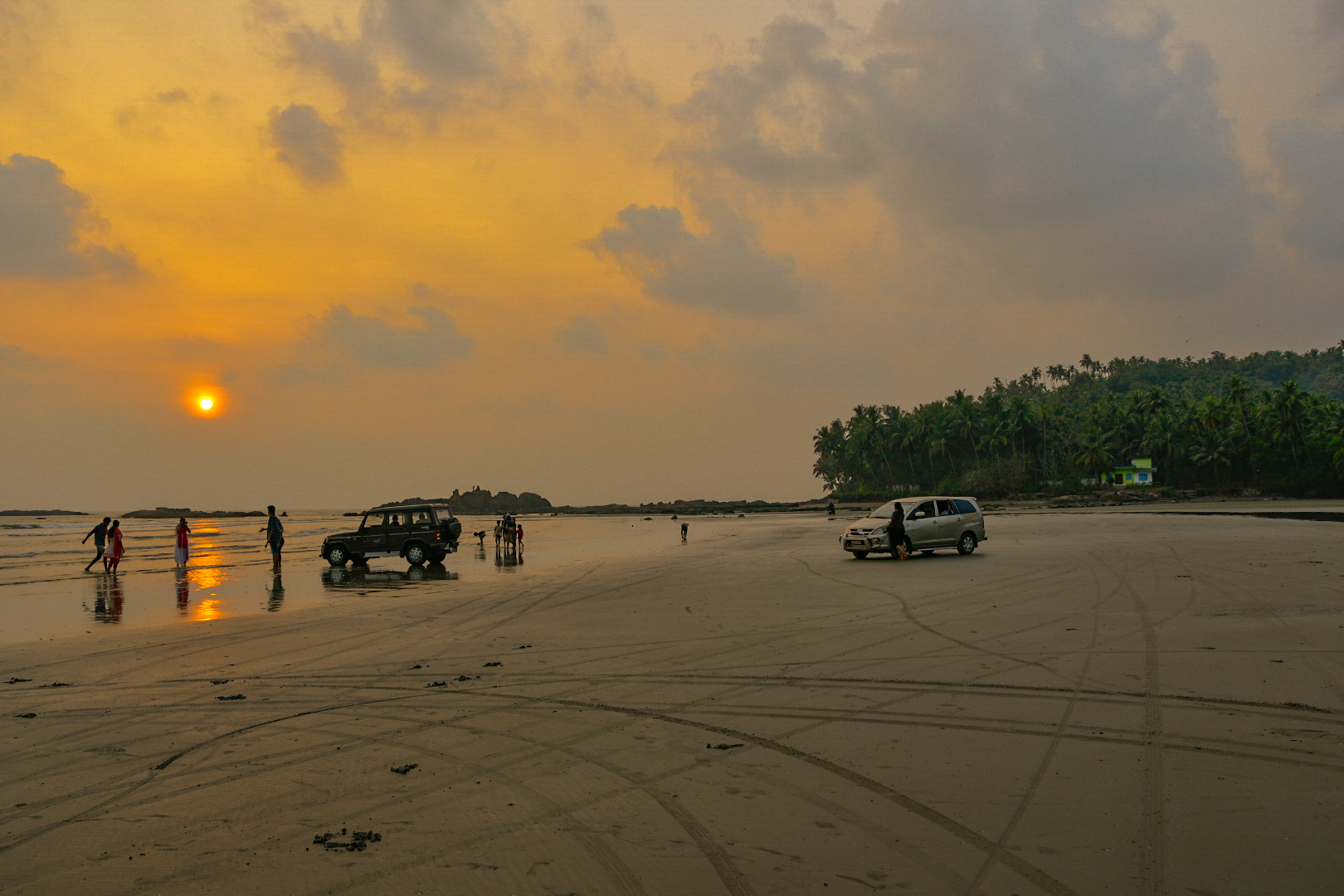
Muzhappilangad Beach is the longest drive-in beach in Asia

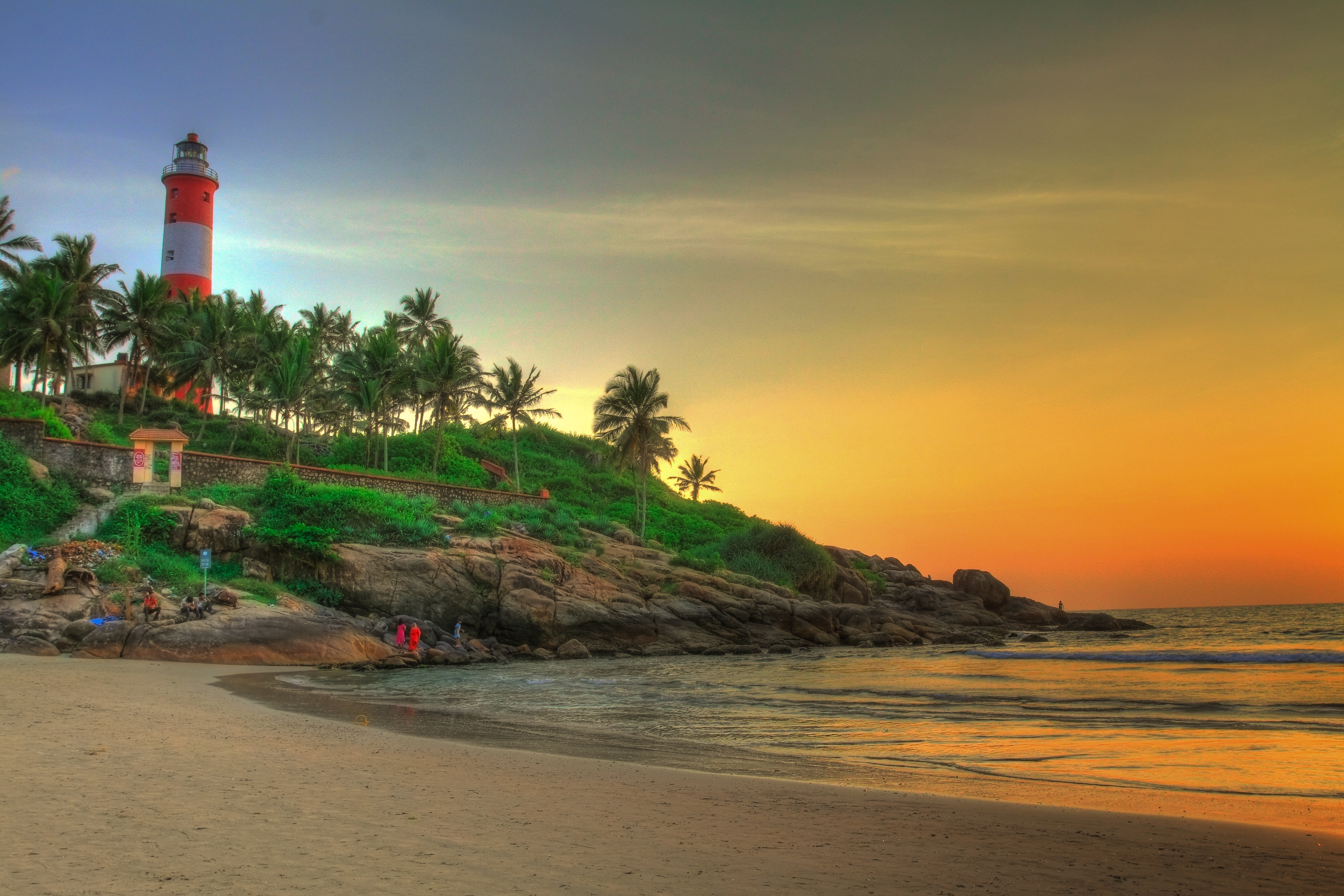
Kovalam Beach in Trivandrum city

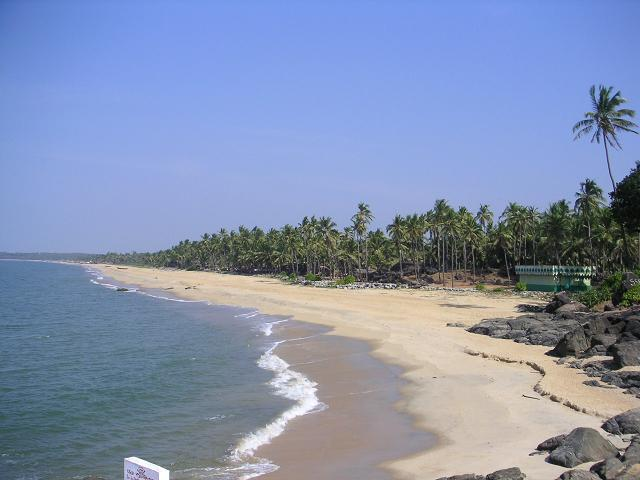
Bekal fort beach

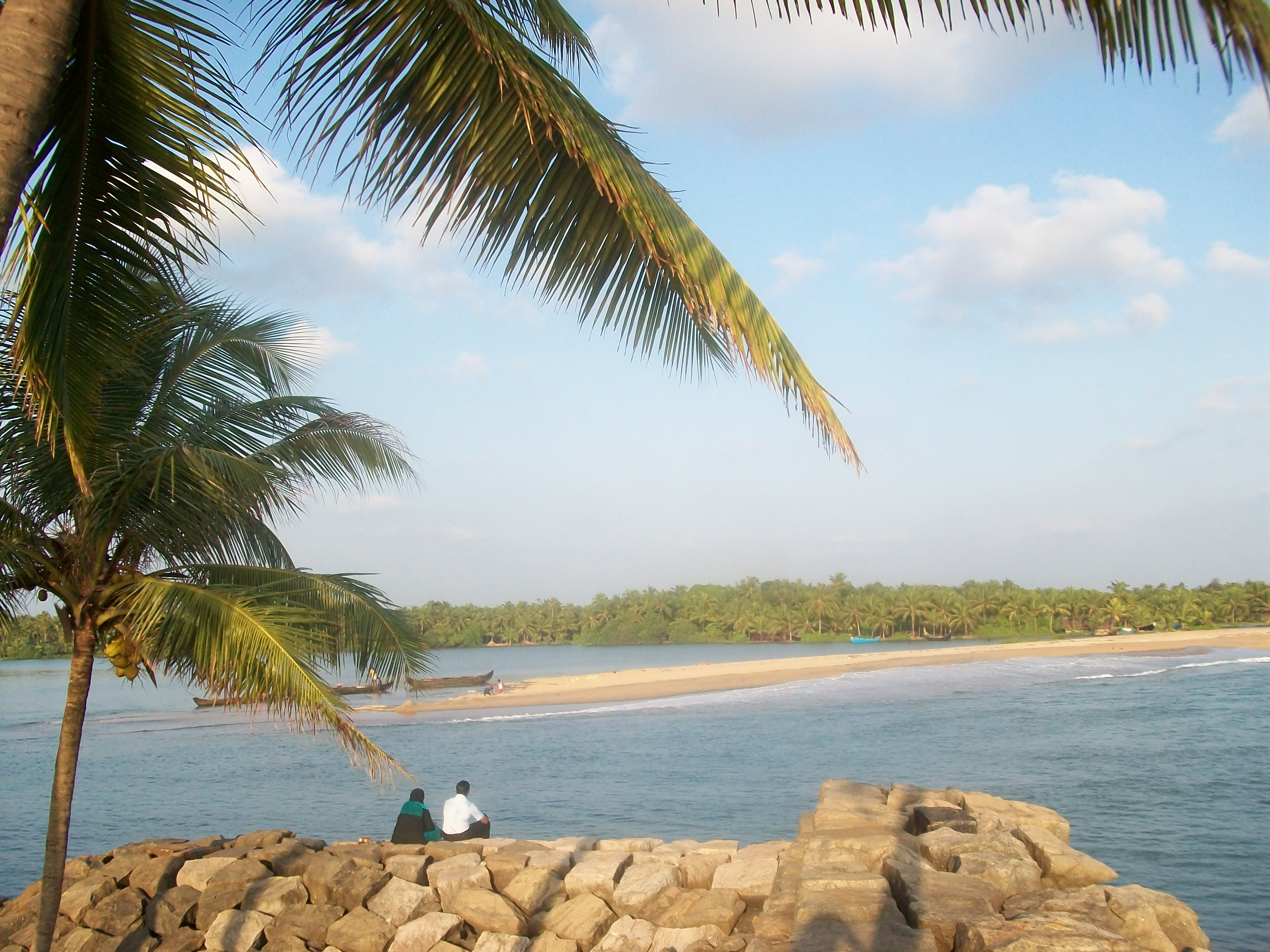
Puthuponnani promontary beach, Malappuram

Beaches in the Indian state of Kerala are spread along the 550-km Indian Ocean coastline. Kerala is an Indian state occupying the south-west corner of the subcontinent. The topography of the coastline is distinctive and changes abruptly as one proceeds from north to south. In the northern parts of Kerala, in places such as Bekal, Thalassery and Kannur, the headlands rise above the shore from the fringe of the beaches. The highlands are dotted with forts built by the colonial powers – the Portuguese, the Dutch and the British. The view of the surrounding area is mesmerizing. From Kozhikode, once the hub of the Malabar coast, the view changes to flat lands with rocky outcroppings jutting out. One feature is common all through – the coconut tree in large numbers. Dense groves of coconut trees line the coast and extend to the interiors.

== Tourism ==
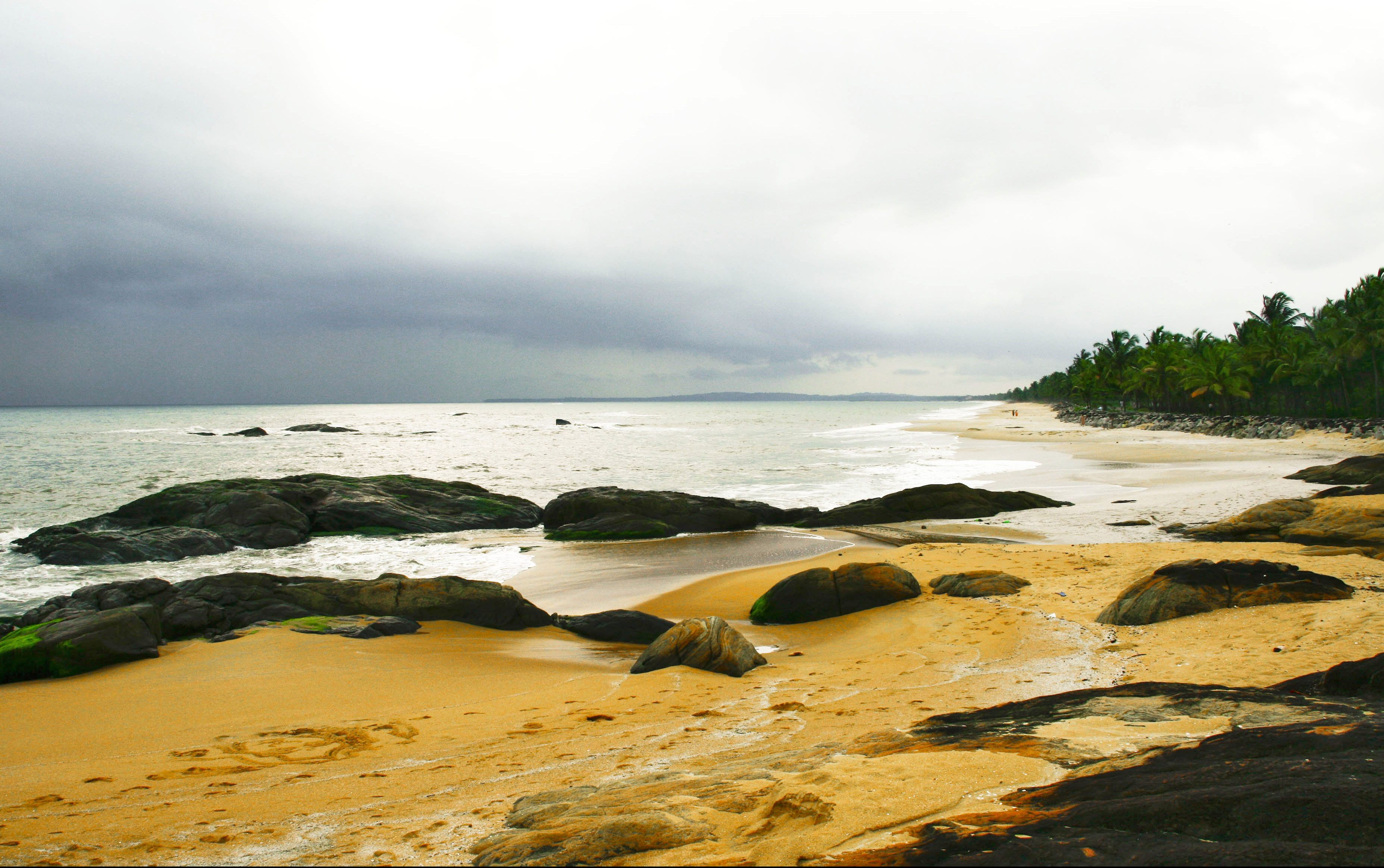
Kappad beach

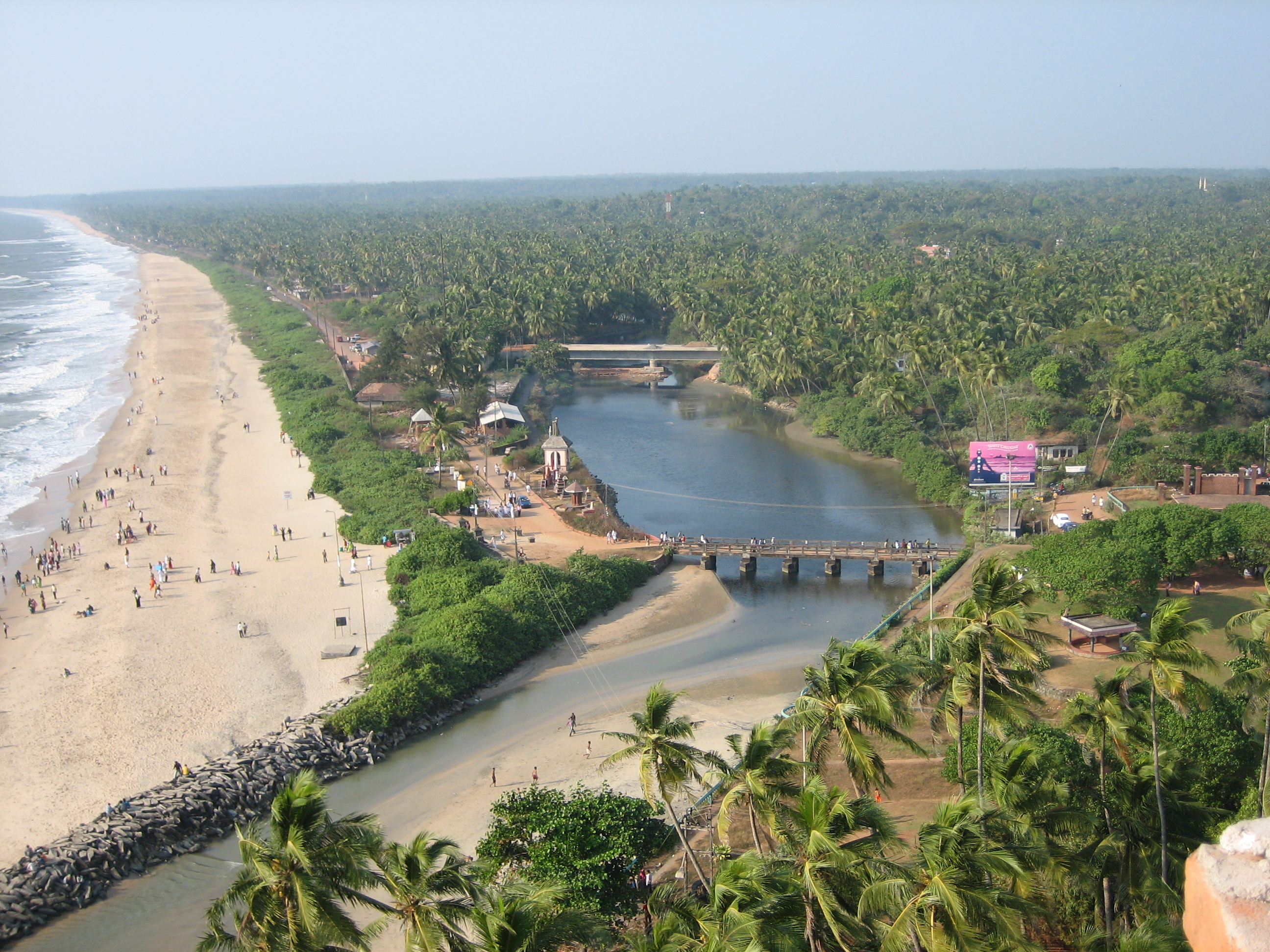
Payyambalam beach, Kannur

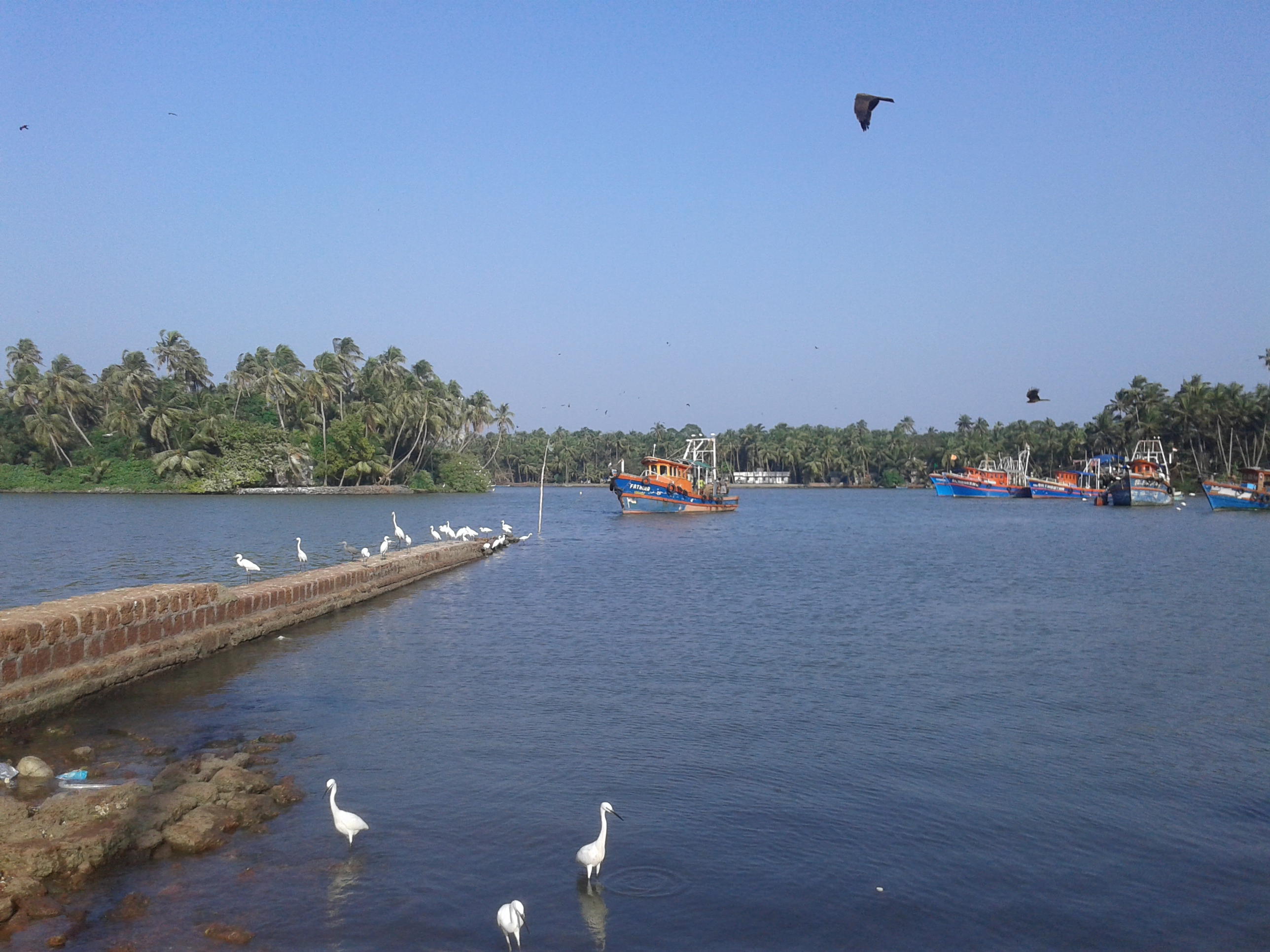
Natural Harbour at Chaliyam, Kozhikode

The long coastline of Kerala is inextricably entwined with the culture, life and traditions of the state. Memories of early seafarers and traders have faded, but boats of various types and styles have survived. Kerala's beaches, or Kovalam to be more specific, were rediscovered by back-packers and tan-seekers in the sixties. Hordes of hippies followed in the seventies. That started the transformation of the casual fishing village into a busy tourist destination. In 2002, there were 66 hotels in Kovalam, and that too in a place that is just 16 km from the state capital Thiruvananthapuram.

From a measly 29,000 overseas tourists visiting Kerala in 1979, the number rose to 225,000 in 2000 and the number of tourists is growing rapidly. Foreign tourist arrivals in Kerala in 2006 was 428,534, an increase of 23.68% over the previous year. Domestic tourist arrivals were 6,271,724, an increase of 5.47% over the previous year. The ABC of Kerala tourism is ayurveda, beaches, (backwater) canals.

While details of incoming tourists are not available, indications of a survey are that domestic tourists are high from Gujarat and Maharashtra both located on the west coast of India, and international tourists are mostly from Europe. Beaches were amongst the favourite destination of foreign tourists.

Lying between north latitudes 8°18' and 12°48' . Kerala is well within the humid equatorial tropics. The mean annual temperature ranges from 25.0 to 27.5 °C in the coastal lowlands. With 120–140 rainy days per year, Kerala is also influenced by the seasonal heavy rains of the southwest summer monsoon.

== Tsunami ==
Tsunami waves diffracted around the Indian peninsula, hitting Kerala on the west coast on the afternoon of 26 December 2004. The death toll in Kerala was 170 against 7,923 in neighbouring Tamil Nadu. However, there was panic all around. In the Thiruvananthapuram area alone, 100,000 people were evacuated from coastal villages by the district administration and 57 relief camps were opened.

== Trinkets ==
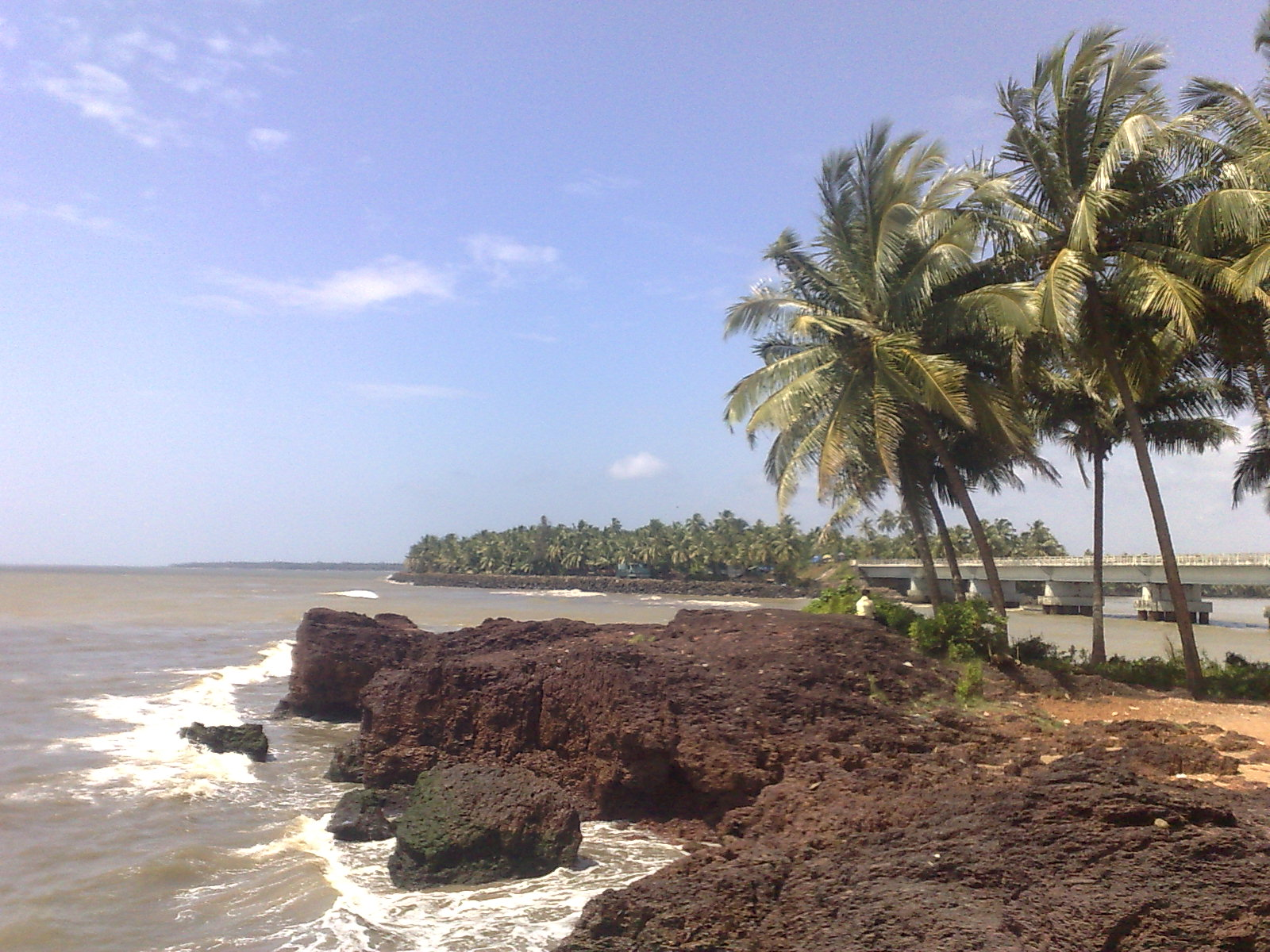
Kadalundi River estuary beach

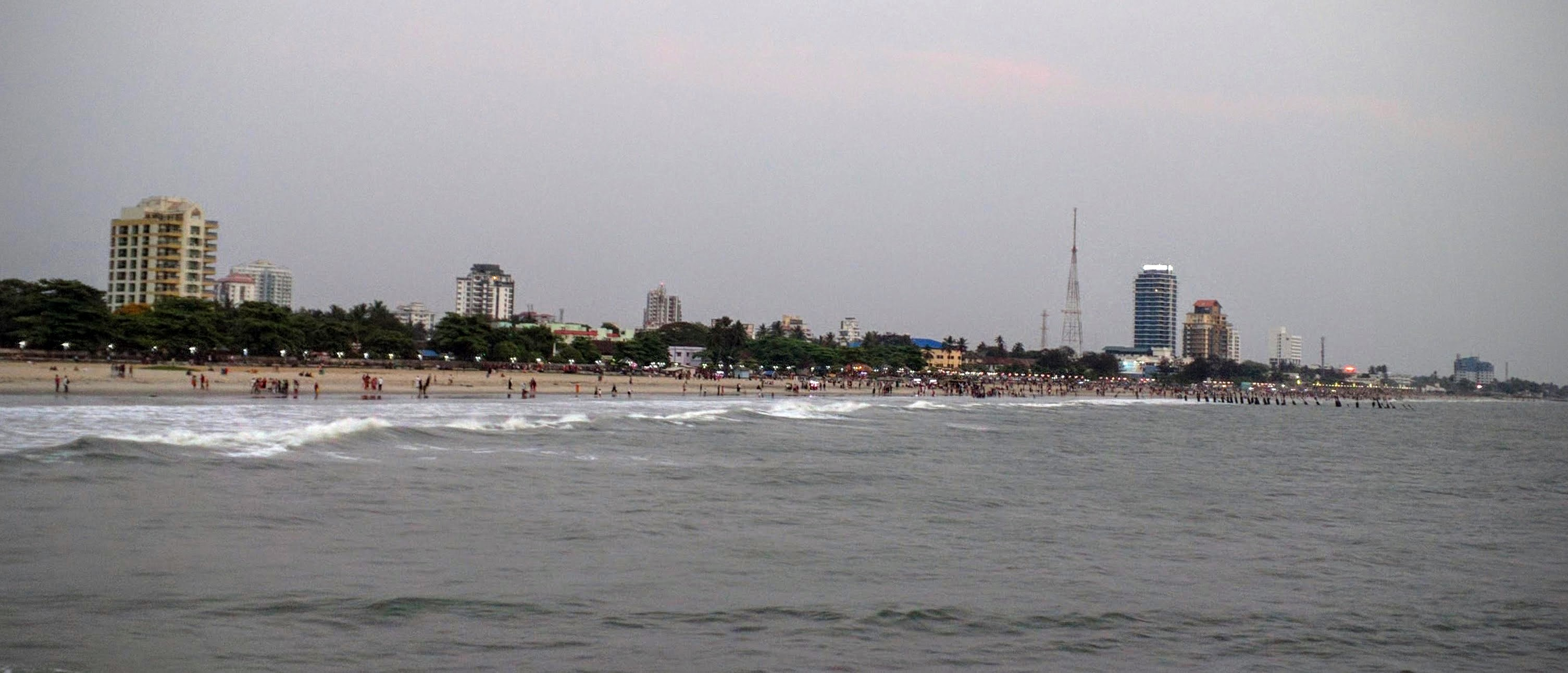
Kozhikode Beach

The fun of sea and sun bathing or watching the wave crash are not the only attractions of beaches. There is a belief that a dip in waters of Papanasam Beach at Varkala, of Trivandrum district, 40 km north of Trivandrum city, washes away sins (papam). Priests from the 2,000-year-old Janardhana temple are there to assist believers to perform the rituals. The main bell of the temple was presented by the Dutch captain of a sailing ship in the 17th century. Comparatively lower hotel tariffs and cheap food draw in European backpackers and domestic tourists with lower budget to the place.

The plaque at Kappkadavu beach

The Portuguese explorer Vasco Da Gama landed at Kappkadavu (Kappad), a small coastal village in the Kozhikode district, on 27 May 1498, thereby marking the opening of a sea route from Europe to India. A plaque on the beach commemorates the arrival. Kozhikode was earlier visited by Marco Polo (1254-1324) and Ibn Battuta (1304-1368 or 1377).

There is a Hindu burial ground near Payyambalam Beach, 2 km from Kannur town. The remains of Communist leaders such as A. K. Gopalan and E. K. Nayanar are interred there.

== Popular beaches in Kerala ==
Mentioned below are some of the most popular beaches in Kerala.

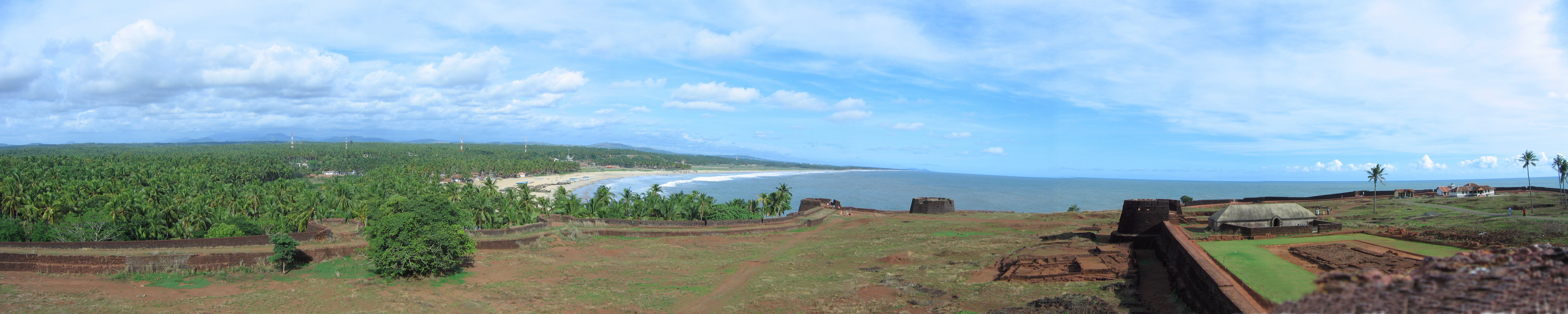
Panoramic view from inside Bekal Fort, which is also the largest fort in Kerala, and the surrounded beach

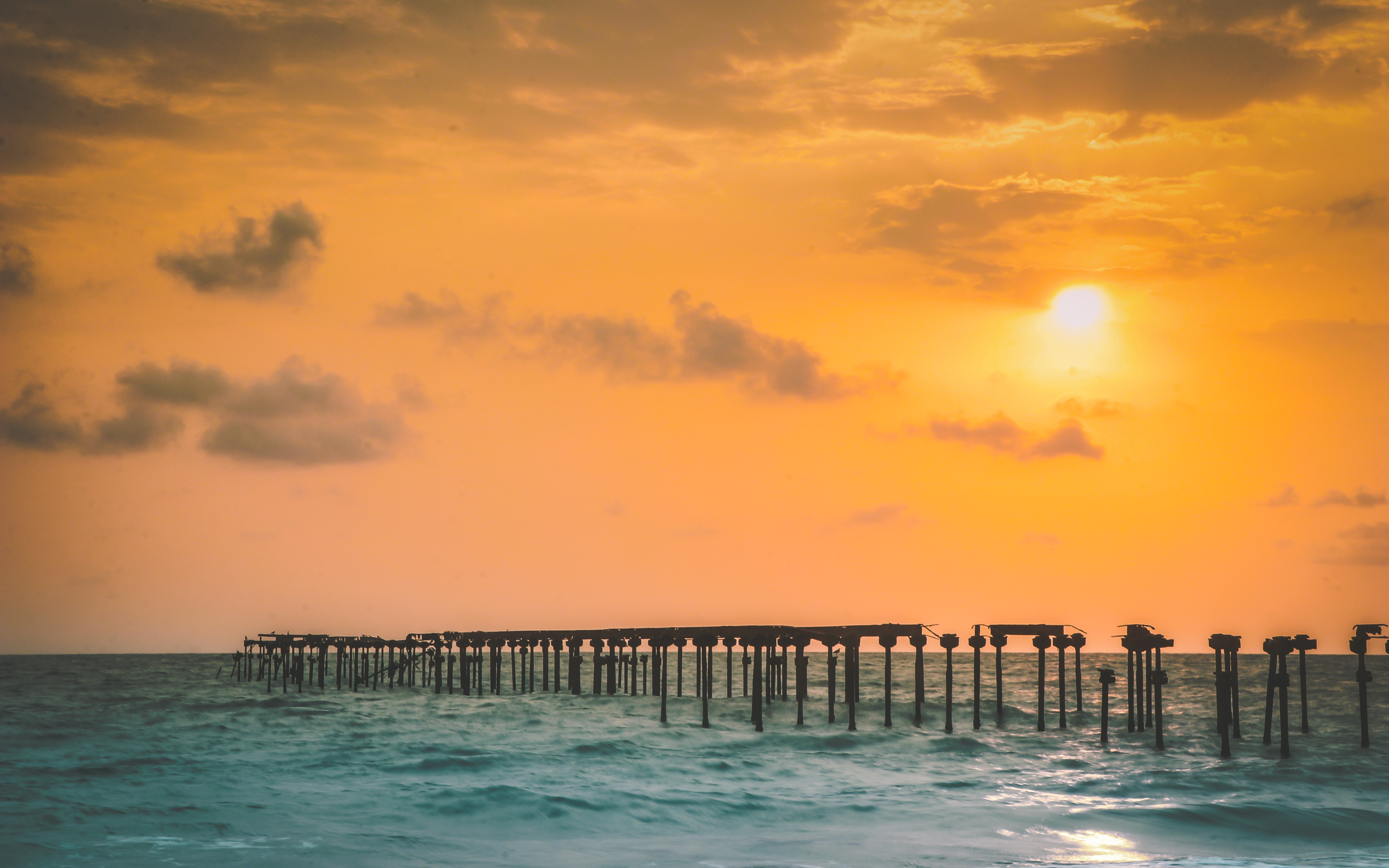
Alappuzha Beach

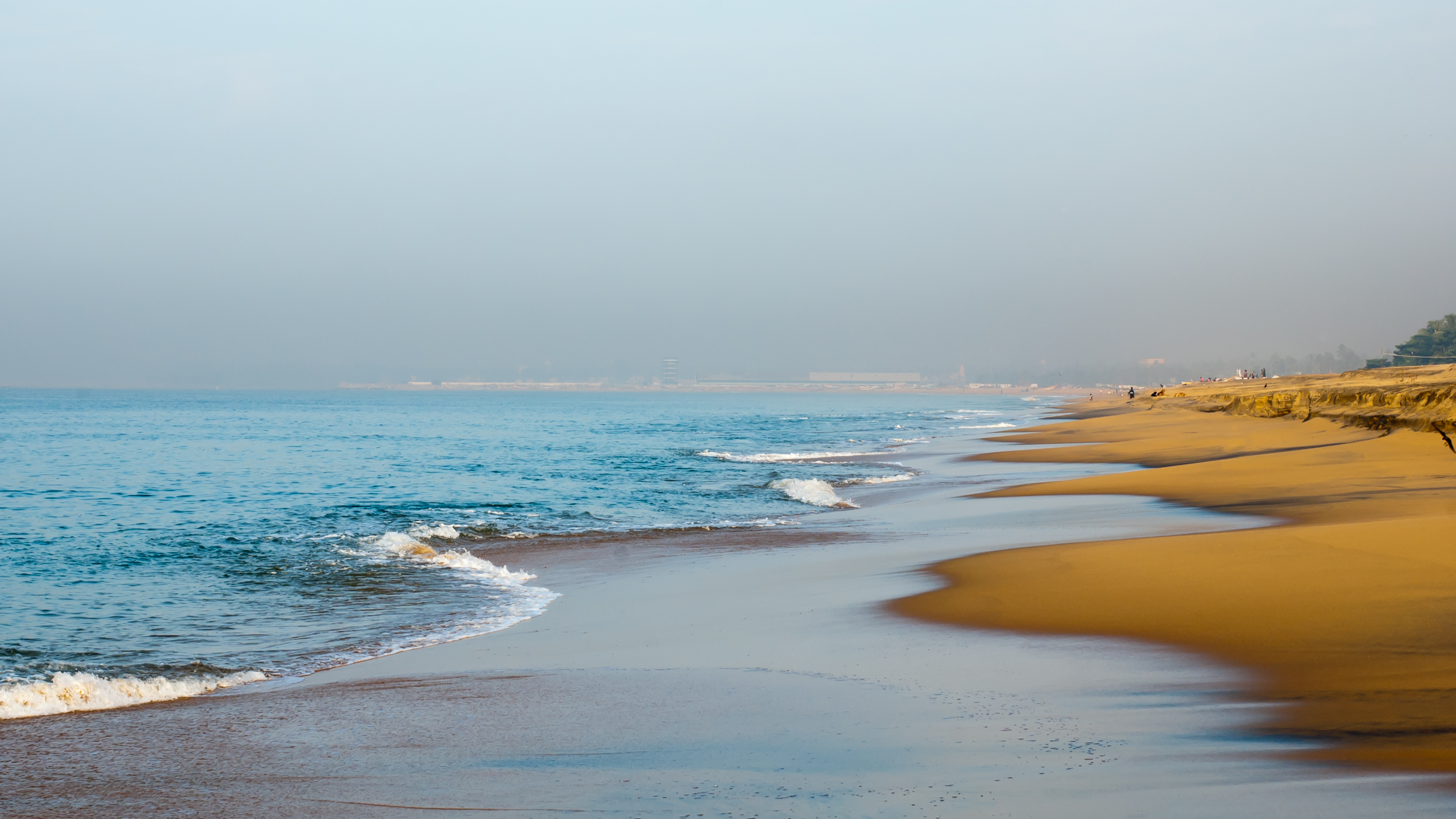
3 km long Kollam Beach is the second longest beach in Kerala

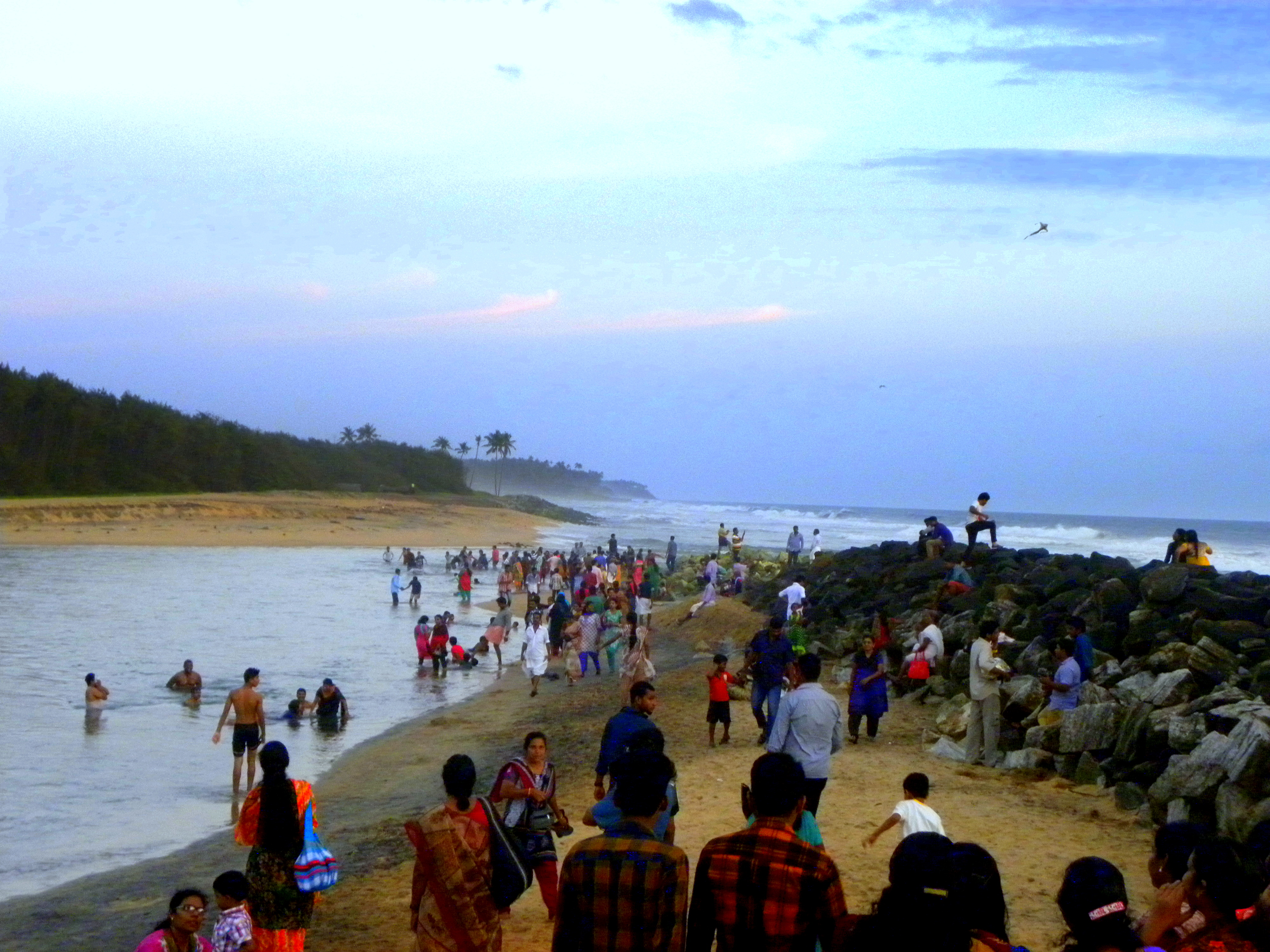
Huge crowd at Thekkumbhagam-Kappil Beach in Paravur

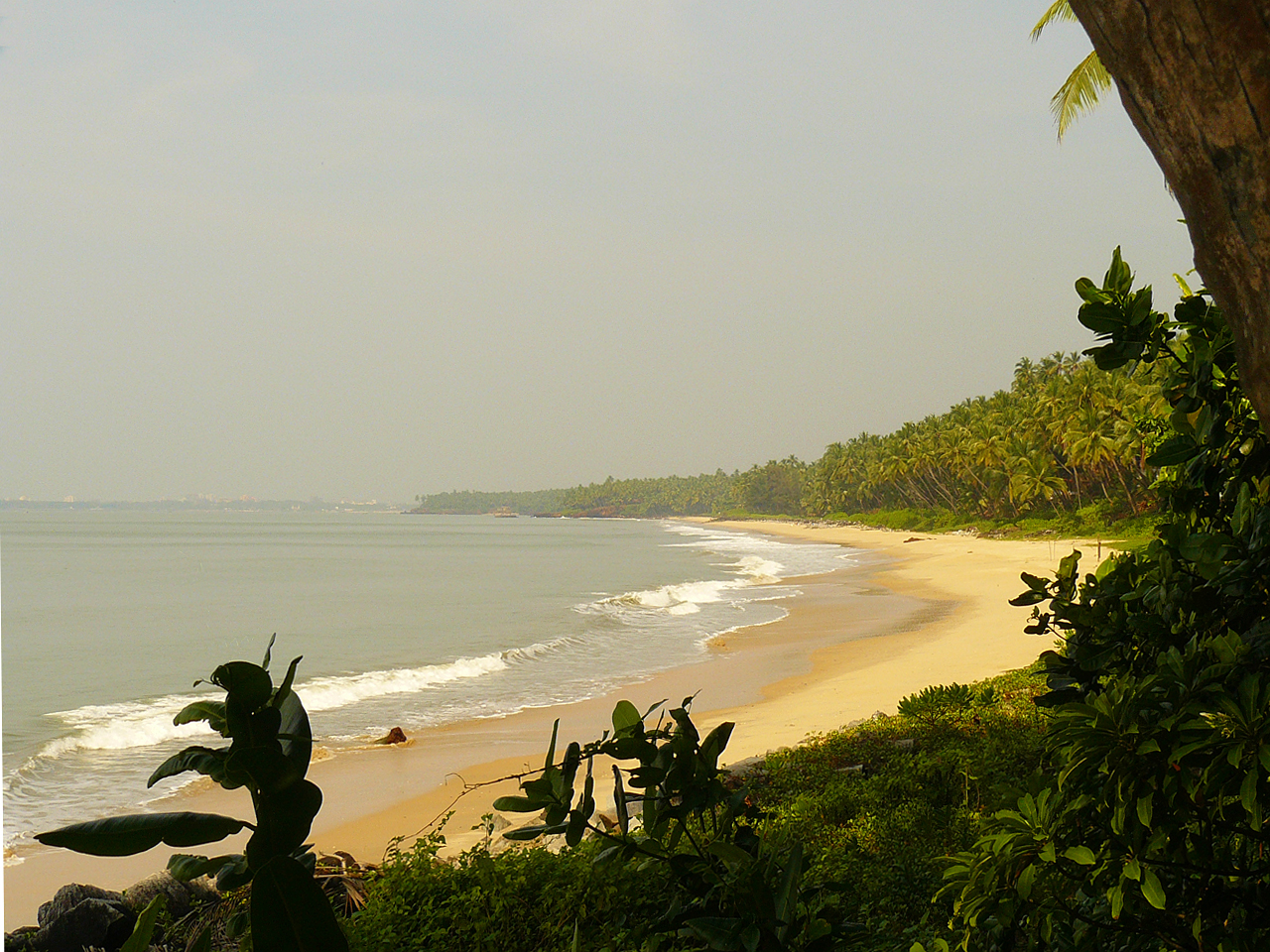
Golden beach at Nadal, Kannur

=== Beaches in North Kerala ===
District	Beach
Kasaragod	1. Bekal, 2. Chembirika, 3. Kanhangad; 4. Hosdurg, 5. Valiyaparamba; 6. Cherangai; 7. Kappil, 8. Pallikere
Kannur	1. Kannur Beach, 2. Payyambalam Beach; 3. Meenkunnu Beach, 4. Muzhappilangad Beach
Kozhikode	1. Kozhikode Beach, 2. Kadalundi, 3. Kappad, 4. Kappkadavu, 5. Payyoli
Malappuram	1. Padinjarekkara Beach, 2. Ponnani; 3. Tanur Beach

=== Beaches in Central Kerala ===
District	Beach
Thrissur	1. Chavakkad Beach; 2. Munakkal Beach; 3. Snehatheeram Beach
Ernakulam	1. Cherai Beach; 2. Vypin Beach; 3. Puthuvype Beach; 4. Kuzhuppilly Beach; 5. Chellanam Beach

=== Beaches in South Kerala ===
District	Beach
Alappuzha	1. Alappuzha Beach; 2. Marari Beach; 3. Azheekal Beach; 4. Arthunkal Beach; 5. Thottappally Beach; 6. Pallana Beach; 7. Thumpoly Beach
Kollam	1. Kollam Beach; 2. Thirumullavaram Beach; 3. Thanni Beach; 4. Azheekal Beach; 5. Mundakkal Beach; 6. Thekkumbhagam Beach; 7. Pozhikara Beach
Thiruvananthapuram	1. Kovalam Beach; 2. Varkala Beach, 3. Shankumugham Beach; 4. Poovar Beach; 5. Thumba; 6. Kappil Beach; 7. Perumathura Beach

== Development ==
The total revenue created by tourism in 2006 was Rs. 912.6 billion. This has in turn inspired the Government to spend more on tourism. The beaches of Kerala are ready to look prettier, with the Kerala Tourism launching a Rs. 1,000 million plan for the development of 22 beaches, including Kovalam, Alappuzha, Nattika, Cherai, Muzhappilangad, Bekal and Kappad. The beach conservation and development works will be completed by the 2008 year-end tourism season.

== See also ==
- Tourism in Kerala
- List of beaches in India
