= C. M. Abdulla Moulavi =

Muslim scholar from Kerala

CM Abdulla Moulavi
- Born: 1933; Chembirika, Kasaragod district, Kerala, India.
- Died: 15 February 2010
- Known for: Islamic jurisprudence, astronomy, mathematics, literature, founder of Malabar Islamic Complex

CM Abdulla Moulavi (Arabic: سي.ام. عبد الله مولوي, Malayalam: സി.എം. അബ്ദുല്ല മൗലവി) widely known as Chembirika Qazi, was a Muslim scholar hailing from Chembirika, a village in Kasaragod district and former vice President of Samastha Kerala Jamiyathul Ulama. He was well known for his special calibre in astronomy and mathematics. He strived for the progress of Muslims and laid foundation for Jamiya Sa'adiya Arabiya (Deli, Kasaragod) and Malabar Islamic Complex (Chattanchal, Kasaragod). He wrote down many oeuvres in astronomy and Islamic jurisprudence and established a timetable for the prayer time (Namaz time). He served as Qazi for about 100 Mahals (localities) and concentrated his work based on Mangaluru. He was appointed as the Qazi of Mangaluru province after the demise of late Qazi Kota Abdul Khader Musliyar. He strived for the communal harmony in Karnataka.

== Early life ==
Born in 1933 into a famous scholarly family in the Chembirika village of Kasargod, Qazi got his initial education from his father C Muhammad Kunhi Musliyar Al Jamhari, a verily respected scholar whose abode worked as a traditional court and a spiritual refuge for seekers. Muhammad Kunhi Musliyar taught various branches of Islamic knowledge at the native mosque for 25 years, and acted as the Qazi of several adjoining villages, called Mahallu. When he died in 1973, CM Abdullah Moulavi was unanimously asked to inherit his father. By that time he had earned sound knowledge, maturity and insights needed to keep the scholarly heritage of the family.

== Education ==
While studying religious subjects from his father, Qazi continued schooling at the Talangara Muslim High School and completed the SSLC. Along with Arabic and local language of Malayalam, he learned Urdu and English languages and became well-versed in all the four languages. He frequently reminded the importance of learning various languages, saying it is a door to the wider world. After SSLC, he continued his education in the traditional mosque colleges (known as Palli Dars) at various places in Kerala. He completed the Maulvi Fadhil Baqawi course in 1962 from the famous Baqiyat al-Swalihat Arabic College, Vellore, Tamil Nadu, a major centre of higher Islamic learning in South India established in 1882. Soon after completing his official religious education he started his teaching career and served as chief Mudarris at different mosque-colleges until he settled in Chembarikka following his father's death.

== Literary contribution ==
An overview of Kerala Muslim history in the 20th century shows the emergence of various religious organizations with both traditionalist and modernist thoughts and philosophies, and their unparalleled activism in setting up religious, educational, social and cultural institutions. Most of the brilliant scholars and intellectuals spent their lifetime in unending social work and creative activities. It is said that due to increased social activism and enhanced focus on the teaching as well as propagation field, the Ulama of Kerala, especially in the 20th century, gave less attention to the field of writing and publication. Many of the brilliant and visionary scholars of the century left no works behind them, despite having possessed qualified knowledge in various branches of Islamic sciences.

However, Qazi Abdulla Maulvi was a different personality. Though he played the active roles of an activist and multi-tasked leader by founding various educational and other institutions and dealing with the social and religious issues of thousands of people in hundreds of Muslim localities, he found time for writing and exploring new horizons of knowledge. He was a prolific writer who authored some ten noted books on various areas of knowledge in different languages. A scholar of Islam, Qazi wrote books, treatises and articles on Hadees, Fiqh, history, genealogy, literature, and even showed his literary skill writing down a poem in the locally developed Arabic-Malayalam language. He also proved his linguistic ability by translating various literatures to and from Arabic, Urdu, English and Malayalam languages. This includes hist translation into poetic Arabic of some of Allama Iqbal's Urdu verses.

== Expert in Astronomy, Mathematics and Qibla Sciences ==
Qazi CM Abdullah Maulvi was an expert of rational or intellectual sciences. He showed amazing interest in exploring comparatively less beaten tracks of astronomy, mathematics and Qibla sciences. Having good knowledge of both classical Arabic and modern English he simultaneously studied traditional Arabic texts in these subjects and the modern English works in the field, making comparative analysis and successful reconciliation between the traditional and modern. He had the habit of observing the celestial objects and the movements of stars in the night. His ability to designate the exact places for mosques and houses was par excellence. He used to prepare timetables of Islamic prayers and of sunrise and sunset through his own explorations, and kept a good understanding of even minute time-differences in various places of Kerala and Karnataka. He even employed latest technologies like Google map and Google earth to designate places and explore its time differences. In the annually-published calendar of his institute Malabar Islamic Complex, he included many of his discoveries regarding prayer timings and moon sights, specifically mentioning certain dates of each month in which there are chances of moon-sighting and in which there is no need to even watch for it.

His office in the Malabar Islamic Complex was a laboratory of an astronomer. There, he kept various instruments used for astronomic explorations including one circular instrument called Dairatul Hindiyya, and he had built a small dais in front of the ground of the Islamic college building, in a place where the sunrays fall throughout the day. This dais or podium was the centre of all his astronomical explorations. In the days meant for explorations he would reach the college campus early to start his experiments. As the sun moves from east to west he would watch its shadows and draw various lines accordingly. Some of his students and colleagues showed less interest in subjects like astronomy, trigonometry and logarithm. For them, the sight of a traditional religious scholar with a long beard, white turban and conventional Ulama dress experimenting with celestial phenomena in the sun using scale and other instruments was unusual. During his reading and revising sessions at his room he can be seen reading works from different areas of knowledge like modern astronomy, mathematics, traditional Ilmul Falak (astronomy) and Hisab (mathematics) as well as texts of Islamic jurisprudence that explain about moon-sighting, qibla directions and prayer timings.

Qazi Abdullah Maulvi was in an attempt to revive a disappearing area of knowledge that has seen tremendous contributions by Muslim scholars, whose brilliant works were widely taught and commented upon at various Islamic higher learning centers. Generally being part of the rational sciences, called ma’qulat or al-‘ulum al-‘aqliyya, Hisab (mathematics) and ‘ilmul falak (astronomy) were included in the madrasa syllabus with an added objective of enabling scholars in preparing charts of prayer times, moon-sighting, seasonal changes, designating qibla direction of the mosques and related things. Mathematics and astronomy, along with subjects like logic, philosophy and Metaphysics, were also taught in the madrasas to enhance the thinking and reasoning capacity of the upcoming religious scholars. Khulasatu'l-Hisab, Euclid, Tashrihu'l-Aflak, Chaghmini, risalatul maradiniya, etc. were key texts used in teaching astronomy and mathematics. With the introduction of secular western education and the ensuing dichotomy of Islamic education into religious and material, the Islamic higher learning centers were effectively alienated from the modern science and technology. Though many of the traditional Islamic schools continued teaching the texts for hisab, astronomy and Qibla science, it never incorporated or accommodated to these subjects the latest discoveries and developments emerged in the west. While some rare brilliant minds kept their interest for these subjects burning, many other learned these for the sake of learning.

== Writing on science subjects ==
He wrote a small treatise in Arabic on logarithms and trigonometry, aimed at giving an easy entry for religious students to modern mathematics with which they can easily comprehend the old texts in the light of modern terminologies. The book is called Tazweedul fikri wal himam fi tabyeeni nnisab wallogarithem (Provision for thought and resolve in explaining ratio and logarithm). Introducing this book, he said that it was written for an easy opening to the world of difficult and ambiguous mathematics. His introductory book on astronomy is ‘ilmul falak ‘ala dhaui ‘ilmil hadees (Astronomy on light of modern science). Incorporating the modern mathematics and astronomy into the traditional astronomy and qibla science he wrote his another work called Risala fi istikhraju auqati ssalati wa sumutul qibla ‘ala tariqi hisabi logarithm (Treatise on extracting prayer timings and qibla directions using logarithm mathematics).

Then came the works in English and Arabic describing the result of his lifelong experiments. The declination of the commonly used magnetic compass in designating the qibla direction always troubled his mind. The deficiency of the magnetic compass in clearly designating the exact north, thus its relative weakness in locating the exact qibla direction, induced him to make all his experiments. He developed a new method for exact calculation using logarithm and trigonometry. The above-mentioned treatise was a first step in this regard.

Then to make his discovery known to more people he wrote a quality work in English named ‘Magnetic Compass and Its Declination from Standard Directions’. In its introduction he said, "Most of the people do not care to check the Magnetic Compass they use for making out various points of the basement of their structures for Homes or Mosques where accurate directions of cardinal points should be known. They do not consider the value of the magnetic variation of the place at all while using a magnetic Compass. This aspect was the inducement for the author for endeavor. I have tried, in very simple term in the following pages a brief history of magnetic Compass and clear description of declination of the magnetic needle from the true direction including the method by which to find out the standard direction (cardinal points). This book not only explains the direction and the declination but also guides you to achieve them from their sources." He later translated this work into Arabic as ‘Al-Buswilatul Mu’antisiyya wa inhirafuha ‘anil jihatil aswliyya’.

He has reportedly written some other works in this field, but decided not to publish them fearing that their contents would be tough for common people to understand. In his final days, he had mentioned to his well-wishers about the plan of a work on geography. He had the habit of observing stars in certain nights. However, it is painful that his lifelong dedication for exploring astronomy and unusual interest in synthesizing the contributions of medieval Muslim scholars and those of modern astronomy and mathematics went unnoticed until his death. As his fields of activities remained with the common people and his engagements as a religious scholar, teacher and qazi kept him busy always, the scientific achievements of this traditional Islamic scholar got no entry into academic seminars or journals.

== Reconciliation of traditional and modern in Islamic education ==
Qazi C. M. Abdullah Maulvi is also remembered for his pioneering role in the post-independence bids among Kerala Muslims to reconcile traditional and modern knowledge in Islamic higher learning centers. Having proved through his own example that there is no contrast in embracing both simultaneously, he led movements for teaching the so-called material subjects in Islamic colleges. He emphasized the need to learn various languages including English, saying languages are doors to the abundant world of knowledge.

== Demise ==
Usthad was founded drowned in the early morning of 15 February 2010. The large crowd from the all sector of the people paid their homage to their respected scholar. The CBI was commissioned to investigate the mysterious premature death of the Qazi.
