= Ponman =

2025 film by Jothish Shankar

- Theatrical release poster
- Directed by: Jotish Shankar
- Written by: G. R. Indugopan; Justin Mathew
- Based on: Nalanchu cheruppakkar (transl. "Four or five young people") by G. R. Indugopan
- Produced by: Vinayaka Ajith
- Starring: Basil Joseph; Sajin Gopu; Lijomol Jose; Anand Manmadhan; Deepak Parambol
- Cinematography: Sanu John Varghese
- Edited by: Nidhin Raj Arol
- Music by: Justin Varghese
- Production company: Ajith Vinayaka Films
- Distributed by: Ajith Vinayaka Release
- Release date: 30 January 2025
- Running time: 127 minutes
- Country: India
- Language: Malayalam
- Budget: ₹3 crore
- Box office: ₹18.3 crore

Ponman (transl. Kingfisher; lit. 'Gold man') is a 2025 Indian Malayalam-language black comedy thriller film directed by Jothish Shankar. The film stars Basil Joseph, Sajin Gopu, Lijomol Jose, Anand Manmadhan and Deepak Parambol and is based on the novel Naalanchu Cheruppakar (transl. "Four or five young men") penned by G. R. Indugopan.

Kollam was the main location of this movie. Filming took place in many parts of Kollam like Munrothuruth, Thanni, Chinnakada, Kundara, Thekkumbhagam.

The film was released on 30 January 2025 and received critical acclaim from both critics and audience. The film was commercial success at box office.

== Plot ==
Set in the coastal town of Kollam the story follows Terrence Bruno, an unemployed and hot-tempered man deeply involved in politics. He lives with his mother, Agnes, and younger sister, Steffi, near the seashore. Bruno has a reputation for stirring trouble, making enemies in the community. His aggressive nature is evident when he beats up a church member who protests against his political party pasting campaign posters on the church walls.

Bruno's mother is eager to get Steffi married, but in Kollam's dowry-driven society, they struggle to meet the demands. The family arranges Steffi's marriage with Mariyano, a prawn farmer from the island of Thalavettichira, whose family demands 25 sovereigns of gold as dowry. With no savings and no goodwill due to Bruno's behavior, they find themselves helpless. The church refuses aid, and Bruno's political party expels him for his misdeeds.

Desperate, Bruno turns to P. P. Ajesh, a middleman for a jewellery syndicate that supplies gold to brides in exchange for the cash received as wedding gifts. If the cash falls short, the remaining gold must be returned immediately. Steffi's family agrees to the terms, and the wedding goes ahead.

On the wedding night, Ajesh collects the cash gifts but finds only enough to cover 13 sovereigns—far less than expected due to Bruno's poor reputation keeping guests away. With 12 sovereigns still unpaid, Ajesh demands the gold back. Steffi's mother stalls for time, and as Ajesh dozes off, Mariyano leaves for Thalavettichira, with Steffi and all the gold. When Ajesh wakes up, he realizes he has been deceived. Bruno, now indifferent, warns Ajesh that Mariyano is ruthless and his island is dangerous.

Determined, Ajesh follows Steffi to Thalavettichira, posing as her cousin. He soon realizes the challenge ahead—Mariyano's family is protective of the gold, which they plan to use to settle past dowry debts and for their younger daughter's future marriage. Ajesh demands Steffi return the gold, but Steffi refuses while belittling him and her brother Bruno. As tensions rise, Mariyano discovers Ajesh's real identity. When confronted, Steffi is forced to confess the truth.

Ajesh pleads with Mariyano, explaining the deal, but Mariyano coldly refuses, claiming it's not his problem. He declares that he won't be returning the gold as it is rightfully his and he intends to give it away to his younger sister on her marriage. An argument ensues, ending with Mariyano stabbing Ajesh and leaving him injured. When Mariyano returns home, Steffi notices blood on his knife and senses something is wrong. The next day, Bruno arrives to take Steffi home, but Mariyano ensures all the gold remains with him before letting her go.

Steffi and Bruno track down Ajesh's home and discover his impoverished background—his mother and sister struggle as daily wage laborers. His mother, unaware of what happened, simply asks Steffi to tell Ajesh to call home, as she hasn't heard from him in days. This deeply affects Steffi, making her realize the injustice done to him.

Determined to set things right, Steffi attempts to steal the gold from Mariyano but gets caught and publicly humiliated by him. Ajesh, now recovered, returns to confront Mariyano once again, vowing not to leave without his rightful share.

On the night of the island's grand church feast, Mariyano has Steffi wear part of the gold, while the rest remains in his pocket. Spotting them at the church, Ajesh devises a plan. He sneaks to Mariyano's prawn farm and calls him, threatening to open the floodgates and release all the prawns into the open water—destroying his livelihood. Furious, Mariyano rushes to stop him, leading to a final, intense confrontation. In the struggle, Ajesh traps Mariyano's hand in heavy machinery and retrieves exactly 12 sovereigns of gold—what he was owed.

Before leaving, he finds Steffi still waiting at the church. Thanking her for her help, he prepares to depart, but she confesses she cannot return to Mariyano's abusive household. Without hesitation, Ajesh offers her a way out. As they sail away together, he tells her, “You don’t need gold. You are valuable even without it.” They leave the island, choosing freedom over the weight of their past.

== Cast ==
- Basil Joseph as P. P. Ajesh
- Sajin Gopu as Mariyano
- Lijomol Jose as Steffi Graf
- Anand Manmadhan as Terrence Bruno
- Deepak Parambol as Markandeya Sharma
- Rejin Sivadas as Marutha Lalu
- Midhun Venugopal as Ambrose "Kalla Ambro"
- Maju Anchal as Brosch "Brochan"
- Sandhya Rajendran as Agnes
- Shylaja P. Ambu as Lovely
- Rajesh Sharma as Fr. Manikuttan
- Suvarnnan Paravur as Lopez Gonzalves, Party office comrade
- Jaya Kurupp as Lusiyamma
- Vyshnavi Kalyani as Chris Soniya (Mariyano's younger sister)
- Lakshmi Sanju as Chris Niva (Mariyano's elder sister)
- Rakesh Keshav as Amal

== Production ==
The film was announced in February 2024. The film marks the directorial debut of Jothish Shankar, who previously worked as a production designer on films such as Kumbalangi Nights, Android Kunjappan Version 5.25, and Nna Thaan Case Kodu.

Kollam was the main location of this movie. Filming took place in many parts of Kollam like Munrothuruth (Munroe Island), Thanni, Chinnakada, Kundara, Thekumbhagam.

== Soundtrack ==
Ponman

Soundtrack album by Justin Varghese
- Released: 30 January 2025
- Genre: Feature film soundtrack
- Length: 16:08
- Language: Malayalam
- Label: Think Music

Justin Varghese chronology
Sky Force (2025)	Ponman (2025)
External audio
- Ponman – Jukebox on YouTube

The soundtrack was composed by Justin Varghese.

Track listing
No.	Title	Lyrics	Singer(s)	Length
1.	"Kollam Pattu"	Anwar Ali	Resmi Sateesh	4:06
2.	"Braidaathi"	Suhail Koya	Bineetha Ranjith	3:48
3.	"Paka"	Suhail Koya	K. S. Chithra, Justin Varghese	4:36
4.	"Arbhadam"	Suhail Koya	Zia Ul Haq	3:38
Total length:				16:08

== Release ==
=== Theatrical ===
Ponman was originally scheduled to be released on 6 February 2025, but it was rescheduled and was released theatrically on 30 January 2025.

=== Home media ===
The digital streaming rights of the film are acquired by JioHotstar and began streaming from 14 March 2025.

== Reception ==
Anna Mathews of The Times of India rated the film four-and-a-half-out of five stars and wrote, "Ponman is cinematic gold with its brilliant script, acting, direction". Sajin Shrijith of The Week gave it four out of five stars and wrote, "Ponman is one of those rare films where not even one second is dull or boredom-inducing. Every character has a purpose; every character has a clear reason for doing what they do; every character has their share of vulnerabilities; and every character is answerable to somebody."

Vivek Santhosh of Cinema Express gave it four out of five stars and opined that "The film unravels a tense pursuit of gold, laced with humour and deep-rooted emotions, exposing the dark side of the dowry system from a different vantage point with brilliant performances". Kirubhakar Purushothaman of News18 gave it four out of five stars and wrote, "The film, starring Basil Joseph, leaves a lot to ponder about resilience, will of the heart, and survival of the bravest, despite being modest in its story and execution."

Janani K. of India Today gave it three-and-a-half out of five stars and wrote, "With brilliant performances and hardly any lags, Ponman is a realistic film that holds a mirror to society." S. R. Praveen of The Hindu wrote, "Ponman could have easily turned into another film with a progressive message against dowry and the unhealthy obsession with gold. But what we get instead is an engrossing, non-judgemental study of characters, most of whom are victims of social malaise. Ponman is worth its weight in gold."

Vishal Menon of The Hollywood Reporter India wrote, "As viewers, it's never easy to hitch your loyalty to any one character in Ponman in which all the great writing decisions are complemented with equally great performances". Anandu Suresh of The Indian Express gave it two-and-a-half out of five stars and noted that "The Basil Joseph and Sajin Gopu-starer is one of those films that deserve appreciation for its technical brilliance and stellar performances, yet is filled with glaring misrepresentations and the glorification of wrongdoings."
