= Alappuzha Beach =

- Beach
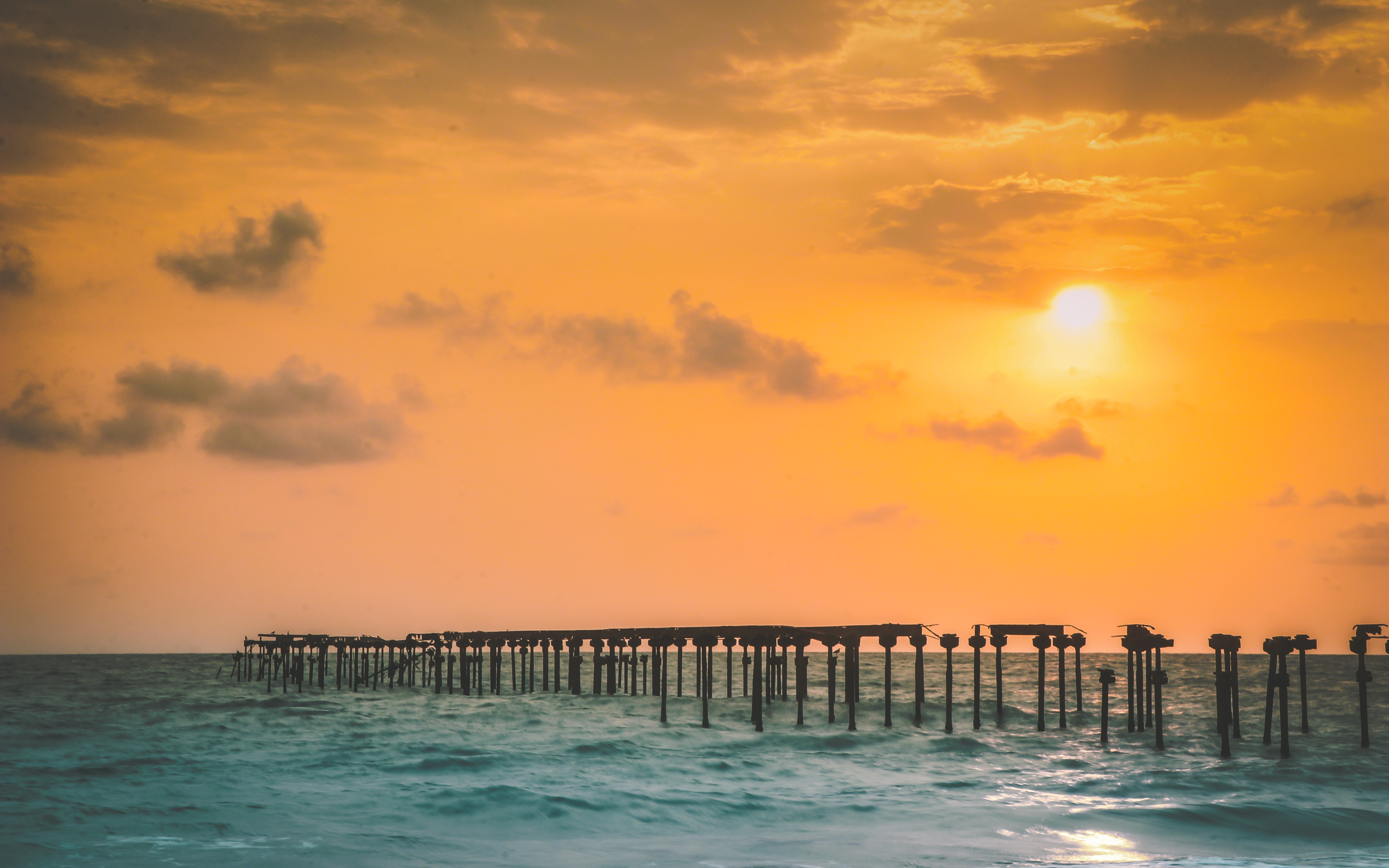
- Alappuzha beach during sunset

- Location in Kerala, India Alappuzha Beach (India)
- Coordinates: 9.492990°N 76.317698°E
- Country: India
- State: Kerala
- District: Alappuzha District

Languages
  - Official: Malayalam, English
- Time zone: UTC+5:30 (IST)
- PIN: 688001
- Telephone code: 0477
- ISO 3166 code: IN-KL
- Vehicle registration: KL-04

Alappuzha Beach (Alleppey) is a beach in Alappuzha town and a tourist attraction in Kerala, India. Beach has an old pier which extend to sea is over 150 years old. Alappuzha beach host many events annually like Alappuzha beach festival, Sand art festival and many more.

== Overview ==
Alappuzha beach is one of the major tourist spot in Alappuzha town. Alappuzha Lighthouse situated near to the beach. Beach is accessible through various town roads and an elevated highway will passing by the beach as part of Alappuzha bypass in order to preserve the beauty of the area. Camel safaris was another attraction in beach which introduced a couple of years ago but it got banned by authorities.

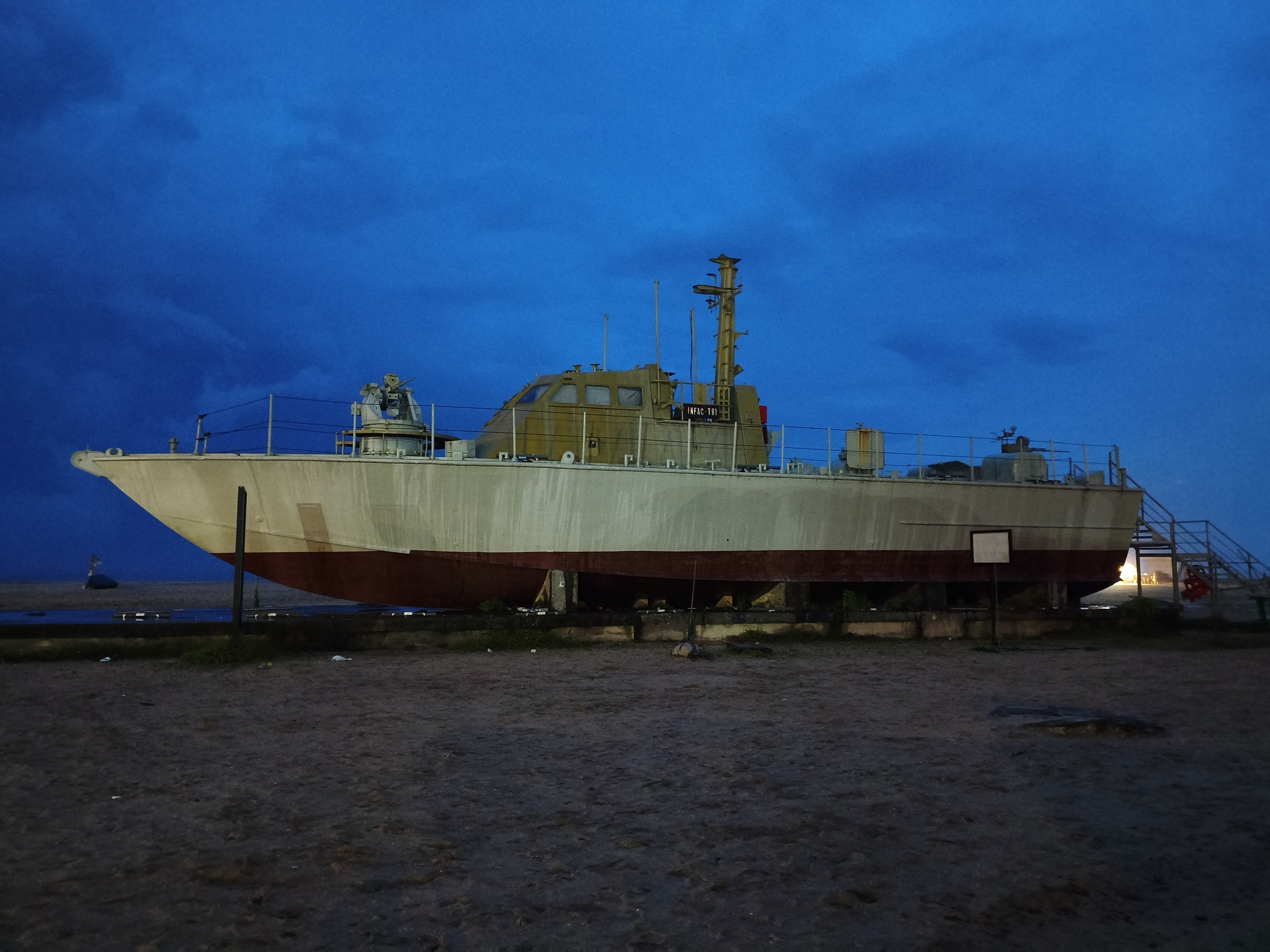
Decommissioned INFACT 81 Fast Attack Craft of Indian Navy at Alappuzha Beach

== Events in Alappuzha beach ==
Alappuzha beach festival is a famous event organised as part of new year celebration. It's organised as an annual event in every year. Thousands of people gathers in the event includes from other district. Kerala's first international sand art festival and competition held on April 26-2015 in Alappuzha beach. Many national and international sand artists participated in event. The state tourism department and the Alleppey Foundation has jointly organised the event.

== Local attractions ==
- Alappuzha Lighthouse
- Vijay Park
- Sea View Park
- Alappuzha Bypass
- Jain Temple
