= Snehatheeram Beach =

Beach in Kerala, India

- Beach
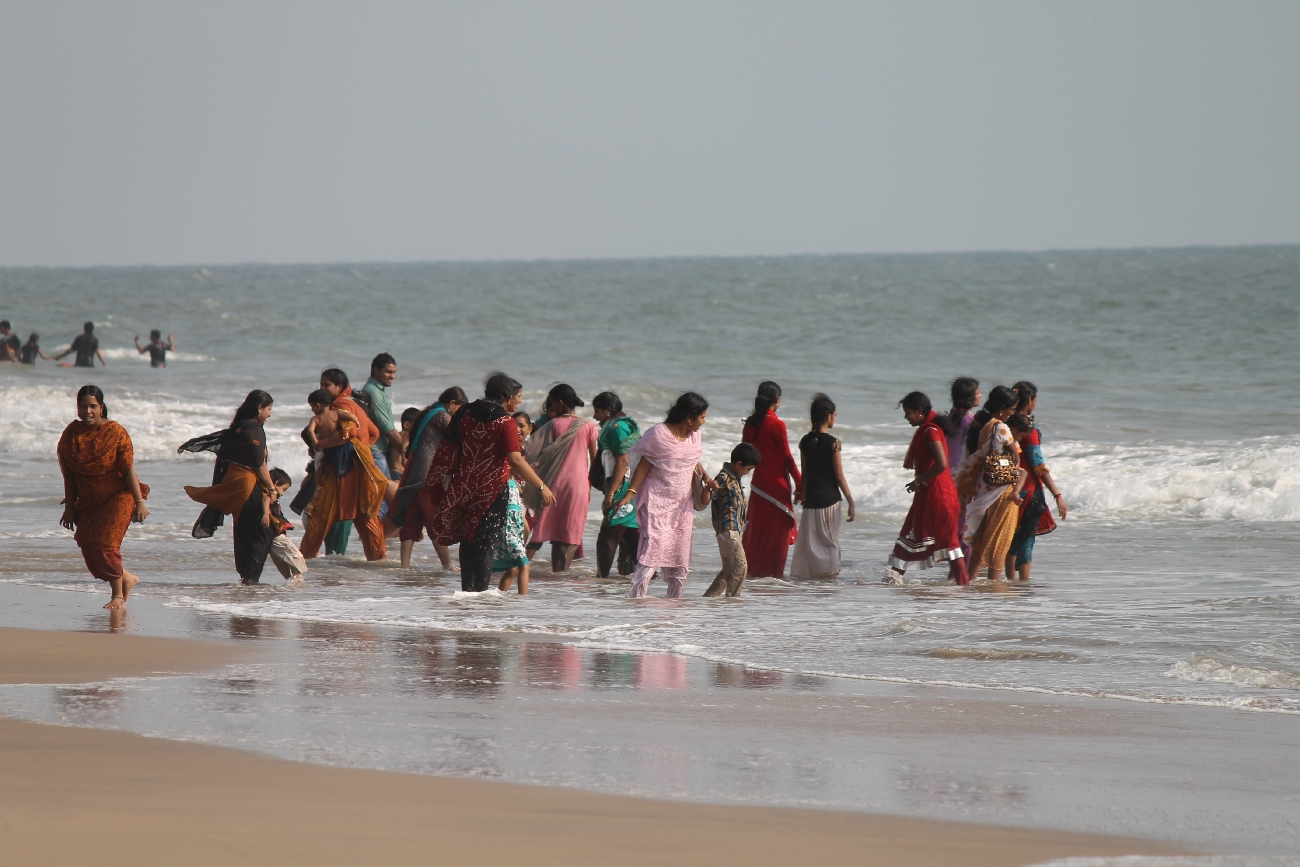
- Visitors @ Snehatheeram Beach, Thalikulam, Thrissur district, Keralam

- Snehatheeram Beach, Thalikulam, Thrissur district, Keralam
- Coordinates: 10.4330°N 76.0767°E
- Location: Thalikulam, Thrissur, Keralam
- Elevation: 29.76 m (97.6 ft)

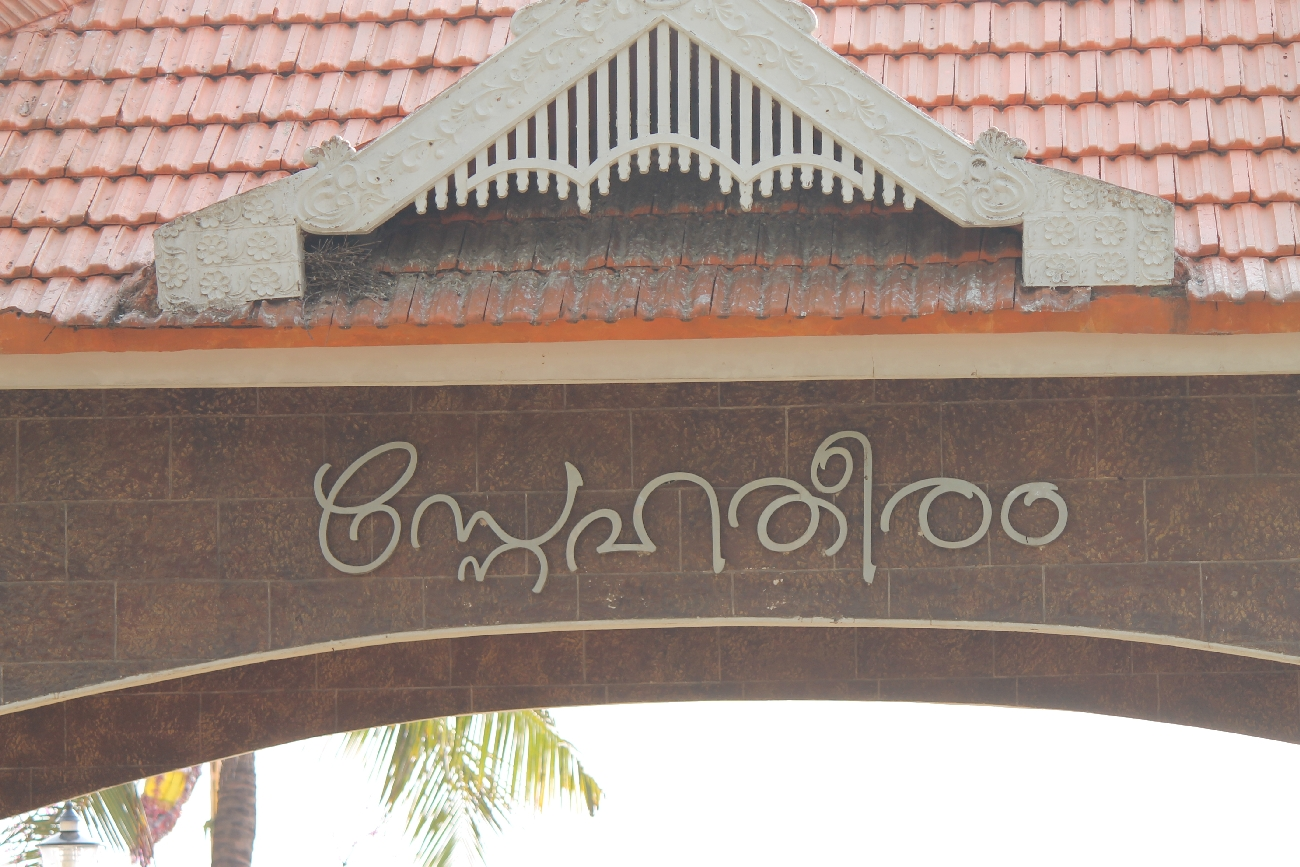
Entrance to the Snehatheeram Beach

Snehatheeram Beach or Love Shore is beach in Thalikulam of Thrissur District in Kerala State of India. It lies on the coast of Arabian Sea and attracts domestic tourists in every season. The beach was selected as the best beach tourism destination by the Department of Tourism (Kerala) during the year 2010. The beach is maintained by the Department of Tourism (Kerala).

== Facilities ==
There is a children's park located near to the beach with all facilities. The entry fee for the park is Rs 10 for adults and Rs 5 for children. An aquarium with a large collection of marine species, a well maintained garden and tiled walkway attract tourists to this beach. A newly added children's play area with 5–10 games, charge per game or 5-game bundle pack. A restaurant named Naalukettu is also available for tourists for enjoying coastal Thrissur sea food.
