= Melparamb =

Melparamb (also known as Melparamba) is a town situated in Chemmanad panchayath of Kasaragod district in Kerala State, south India. It is 4 km South of Kasaragod City & 54 km South of Mangalore town. Melparamb is famous for its soccer tournament and as host for lot of events. The famous tunnel in Kerala Railway called "kalanad" tunnel pass under Melparamb..

Melparamb is a hill and it has geographical area above the sea level.

Some people also refer Melparamb as kalanad or Chandragiri.

== Health and education ==
Various public and private institutions in the field of education and healthcare helped people of Melparamb to maintain high standard of living compared to adjacent towns and villages.

=== Hospitals ===
1. Al Shifa Pharmacy
2. City Pharmacy and City Clinic (Dr. Rafi Ahmad)
3. Clinic run by Dr. Kayinhi
4. Kalanad Nursing Home (also known as Dr Sathya Hospital)
5. Shifa-Sa-adiya Hospital
6. Kalanad Govt primary Health Center

=== Educational institutions ===
==== Madrassa ====
Noorul Islam Madrassa Melparamba Quthubiyyath Madrassa Kattakkal Kadavath Madrassa

==== Schools ====
1. GHS Chandragiri Higher Secondary School
2. Lulu English Medium School melparmaba
3. Melparamba Jama-ath English Medium School
4. GLP Kalanad OLD LP School
5. SAADIYA ENGLISH MEDIUM

== Places of worship ==
=== Masjids ===
1. Muhyuddeen Juma Masjid, Melparamba
2. Aboobacker Siddique masjid, Akkarakunnu, Aramanganam
3. Kuvathotty masjid
4. Kainoth Masjid
5. Oravangara Masjid
6. Riyadhali juma masjid, kattakkal
7. Quthubiyyah masjid kattakkal
8. Masjidun Noor Kadavath
9. jaberi masjid makkod
10. Payota Masjid (Marhoom Saeed Musliyar Maqam)
11. muhyudheen masjid chaliyangod
12. Maravayal Masjid

=== Temples ===
1. Kizhur Sree Dharma Sastha Kshethram
2. Kurumba Temple Chembarika
3. Manyangod mahavishnu temple

== Clubs and organizations ==
1. Chandragiri Club Melparamb.
2. Gymkhana Club Melparamb
3. Green star Koovathotty
4. Thamb Melparamb
5. King Star Kadangod
6. Paatna Arts and Sports Club
7. Green Star Oravangara
8. FASC Kadavath
9. MSC Makkod
10. Valappil Bulls Melparamba
11. Youth Friends Chaliyangod
12. United Kainoth

== Famous Tournament ==
1. NA Trophy NA trophy football history part-1, NA trophy football history part-2
2. Moidu Trophy

== Festivals ==
1. Kizhur Sree Dharma Sastha Kshethram paatu Mahotsavam.
2. Eid is the main festival for people in Melparamb
3. Ratheeb is another festival for people in Melparamb.
4. Milad is another one festival
5. And even more

== Politics ==
- Melparamb comes under Uduma assembly constituency for Kerala State.
- Melparamb is part of Kasaragod Lok Sabha constituency after the delimitation of parliament seats in India.
- Melparamb belongs to Chemmanad Grama panchayath

== Transportation ==
- Nearest Railway station is Kalanad, which do have stop for only passengers trains. The major railway station is at Kasaragod.
- Nearest airport is at Mangalore known as Bajpe/Managalore (IXE) international Airport
- Government transport (K S R T C) bus is the only bus transportation covering Melparamb. There is no private Bus
- Different types of taxi's available in Melparamb.

== Tourism ==
Tourism sites in the area include Chandragiri Fort, one among a chain of forts built by the ruler, situated atop a hill. The fort has views of the convergence of the river and the Arabian Sea. It is also a vantage point to watch the sunset from the ancient Kizhur State Temple at Chandragiri, which celebrates the annual festival called Pattu Utsavam. Chandragiri is situated 4 km from Bekal.

Other sites include the Kalanad Tunnel, Chembirika Beach, and Bekal Fort (the latter 20 minutes in melparamba town).
