= Thalikulam =

- village
- Location in Kerala, India Thalikulam (India)
- Coordinates: 10°26′54.4″N 76°4′54.7″E
- Country: India
- State: Kerala
- District: Thrissur

Area
  - Total: 65.68 km^{2} (25.36 sq mi)

Population (2011)
  - Total: 25,507
  - Density: 1,876/km^{2} (4,860/sq mi)

Languages
  - Official: Malayalam, English
- Time zone: UTC+5:30 (IST)
- PIN: 680569
- Telephone code: 0487
- Vehicle registration: KL-08,KL-46, KL 75 (Triprayar)
- Website: http://lsgkerala.in/thalikulampanchayat

Thalikulam is a village in Thrissur district in the state of Kerala, India.

== Demographics ==
As of 2011 India census, Thalikulam had a population of 25,507 with 11,512 males and 13,995 females.

== Sights ==
Snehatheeram, is a park at Thalikulam beach. The beach was selected as the best beach tourism destination by the Kerala Department of Tourism (which also maintains the beach) during the year 2010.

SREE KHANDA KARNA MUTHAPPAN TEMPLE, Vallath temple, Eranezhath temple, Asheri temple, Thalikulagara temple, Pulikkal Bhagavathy temple, Cherkara Durgha devi temple are the main worship attractions.
