= Munakkal Beach =

Beach in Kerala, India

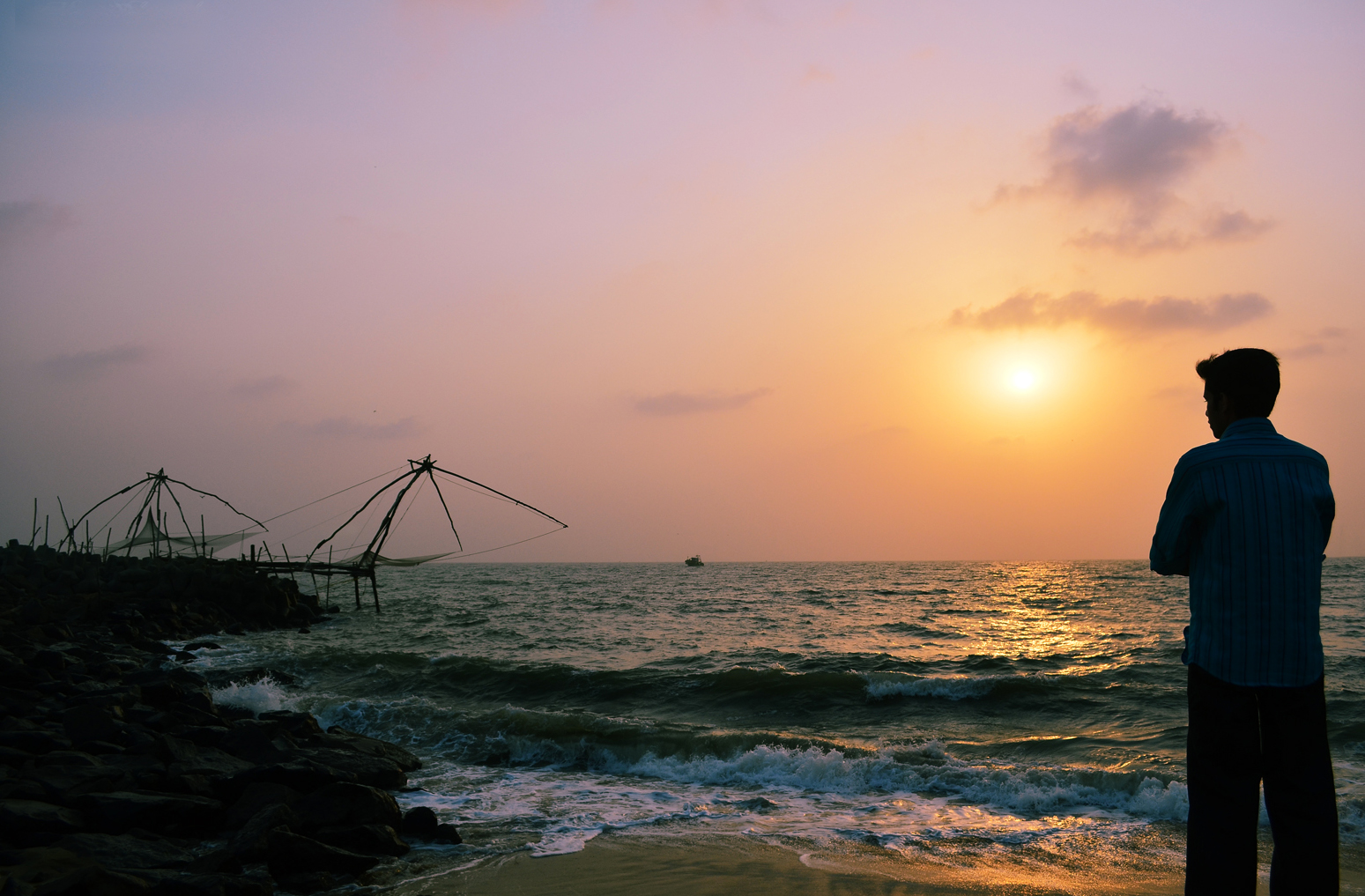
An evening in Munakkal Beach

Munakkal Beach also known as Muziris Munnakkal Beach is a beach in Azhikode, Thrissur of Thrissur District in Kerala State. It is the largest beach in Thrissur District and lies on the coast of Arabian Sea. The beach is situated 8 kilometers from Kodungallur town.

== Facilities ==
The beach was developed under the tsunami rehabilitation programme by Harbour Engineering Department. A 400-metre open-air auditorium, 1300 metre walkway, toilets, food courts, skateboarding grip for children and a rain shelter are the major attractions of the beach. A casuarina forest set up by the Kerala Forest Department is another added attraction.
