= Alappuzha Lighthouse =

Lighthouse in Kerala, India

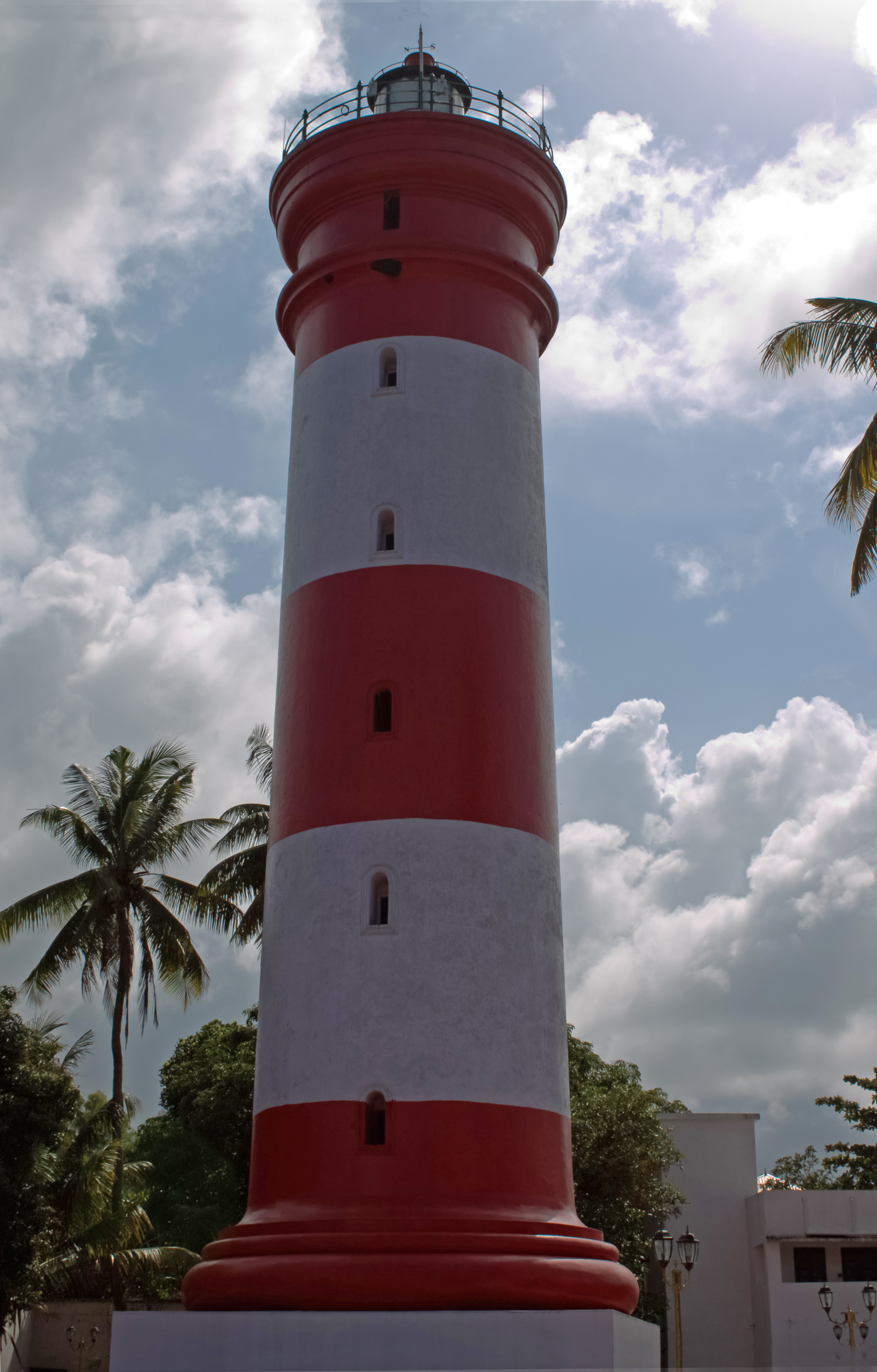
- A view of the Alappuzha Lighthouse
- Location: Alappuzha, Kerala
- Coordinates: 9°29′38″N 76°19′15″E

Tower
- Construction: masonry tower
- Height: 28 metres (92 ft)
- Shape: cylindrical tower with balcony and lantern
- Markings: red and white horizontal bands, red lantern

Light
- First lit: 1862
- Focal height: 33 metres (108 ft)
- Light source: 150 W metal halide lamp (230 V AC recommended power supply / 220–250 V range supply)
- Range: 24.5 nautical miles (45.4 km; 28.2 mi)
- Characteristic: Fl W 15s.

The Alappuzha Lighthouse is situated in the coastal town of Alappuzha, Kerala. It was built in 1862 and is a major tourist attraction. This is the first of its kind in the Arabian sea coast of Kerala.

== History ==
Alappuzha, the place where India's Alleppey Lighthouse stands, was one of the busiest ports and trade centres of Kerala. Alappuzha, a part of Travancore, was ruled by Rajas of Erstwhile Travancore before India's independence. After the arrival of the Portuguese, Dutch and English traders, Vizhinjam, Kollam, Travancore and Purakad were the main ports of Erstwhile Travancore through which foreign trade flourished.

The decline of the Port of Purakkad necessitated the rehabilitation of the traders for which Alappuzha was selected as a port and infrastructure was developed. The port was opened to foreign traders in 1792. There was no regular lighthouse provided in the 18th century, only a light on the pier head served the mariners.

As port activities increased, the authorities had to provide for a lighthouse. The construction of the present lighthouse began in the reign of Marthanda Varma II (ruler of Travancore) and was completed during the reign of His Highness Rama Varma Maharaja of Travancore. The first stone was laid by Mrs Mary Anne Crawford on 26 April 1860.

The 27 m high lighthouse has a teak spiral staircase. A piece of first-order optical equipment with coconut oil double wick lamp light-source supplied by M/s. Chance Bros., Birmingham, was installed and commissioned into service on 28 March 1862. The same equipment continued to serve till 1952 when it was replaced by 500 mm drum optic and DA gas flasher of AGA make.

The current 4th order optic with a 1000 watt electric lamp was installed in 1960. The mains supply was extended to the station in 1960, this enabled the installation of an electrically operated 4th order revolving optic system supplied by M/s BBT, Paris, this replaced the old equipment and was commissioned on 4 August 1960.

The direct drive system was incorporated on 8 April 1998, and a separate emergency light in the 300 mm lantern on 30 December 1998. The incandescent lamp was replaced by 230 V 150 W Metal halide lamp on 28 February 1999.

The lighthouse is still a staffed station. Originally painted plain white, it was repainted in red and white bands in 2000.

== Visit ==
The building has been open for public visits since 2007.

== See also ==
- List of lighthouses in India

== Gallery ==
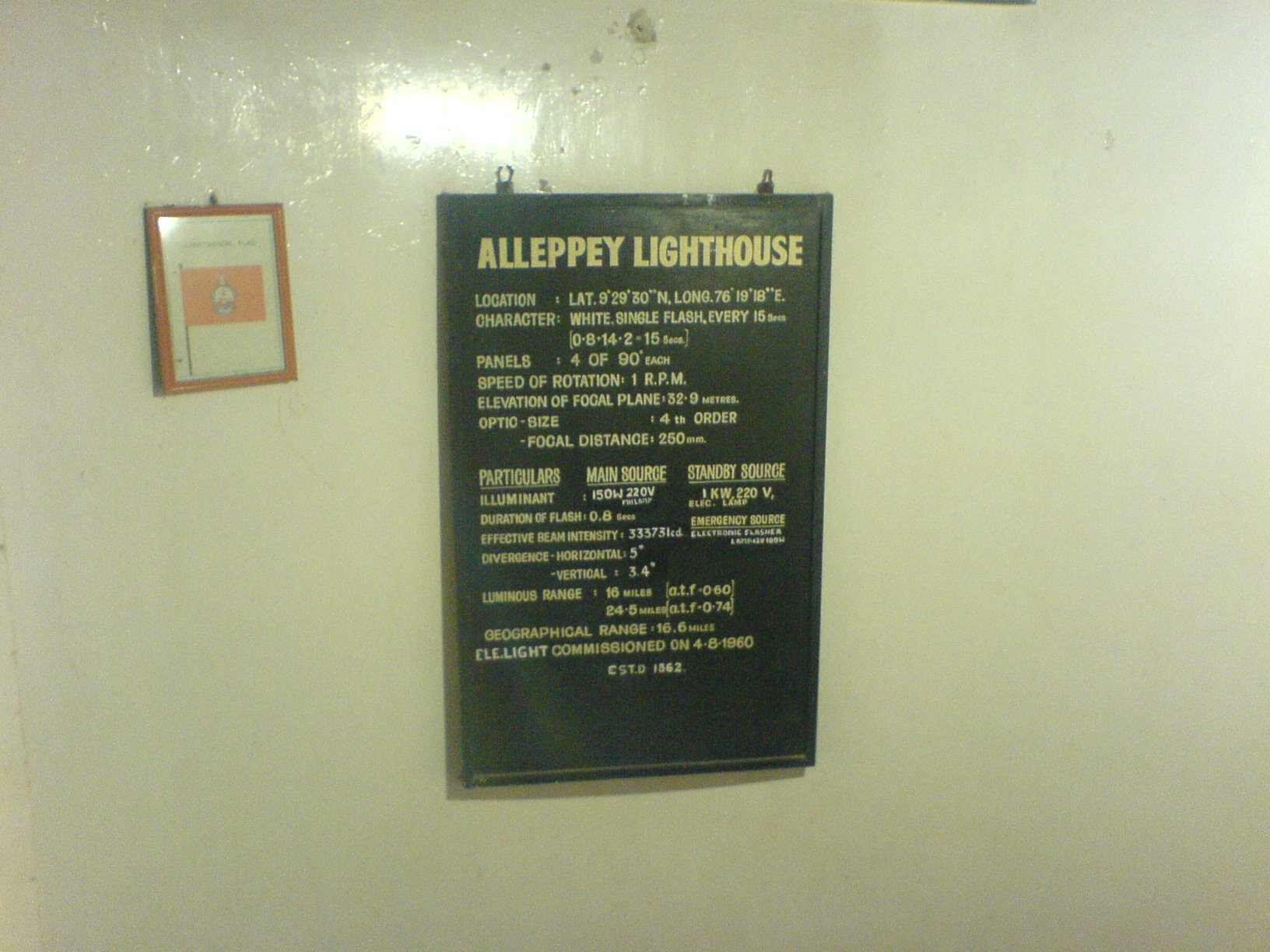
The board at the lighthouse describing the specifications of the same

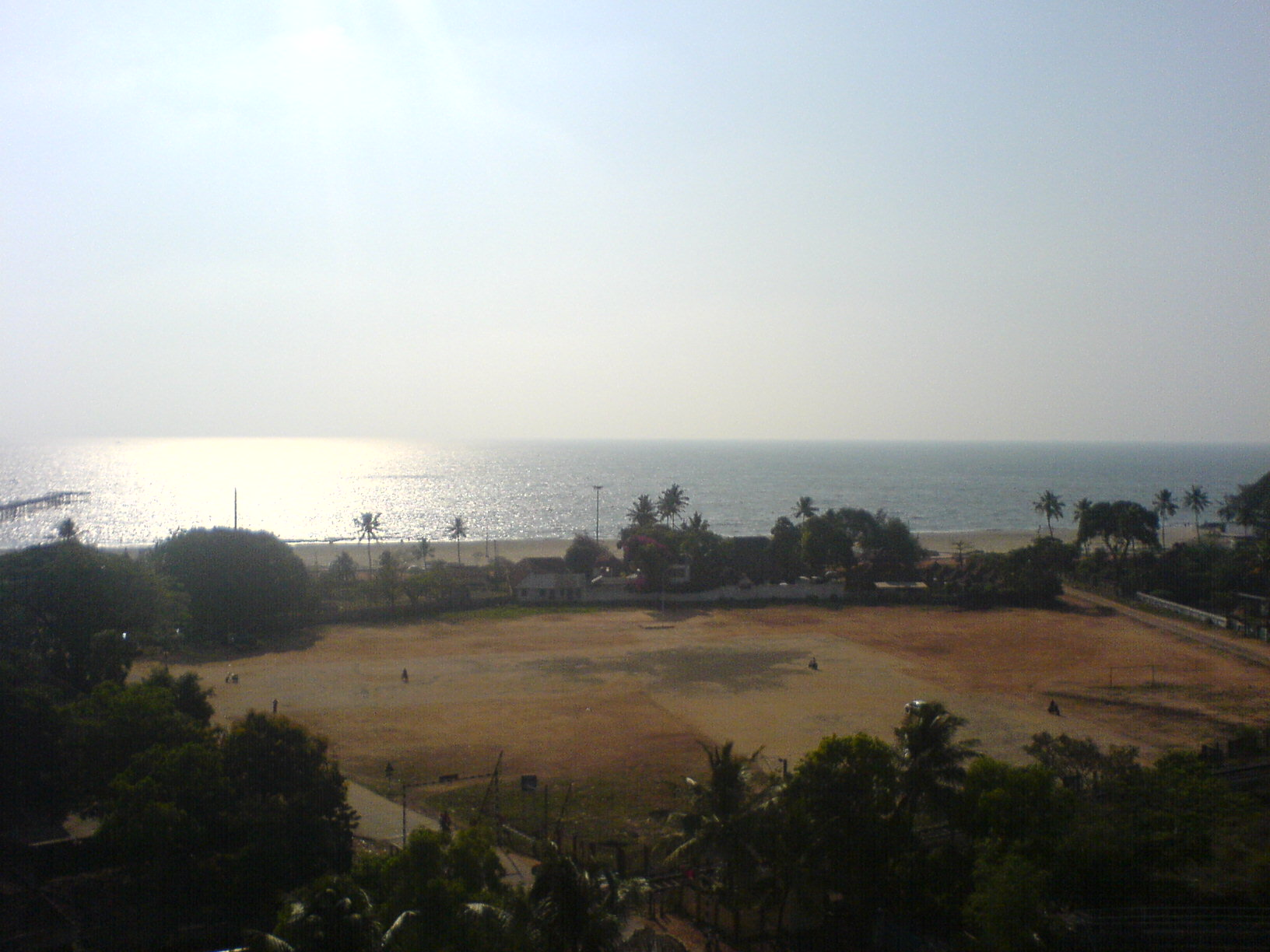
The view towards the west from the top of the Alappuzha Lighthouse – towards the seashore

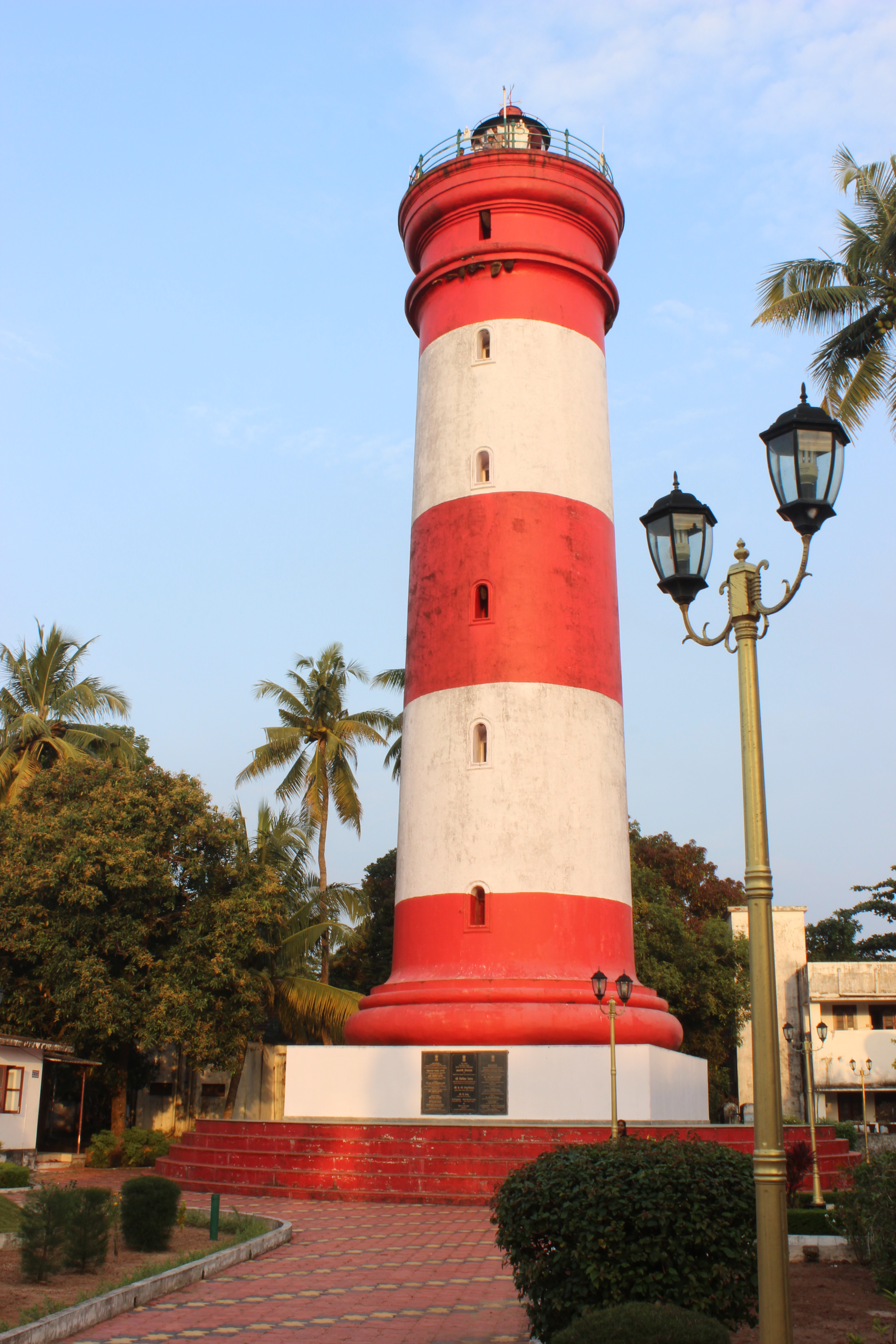
Alappuzha Lighthouse

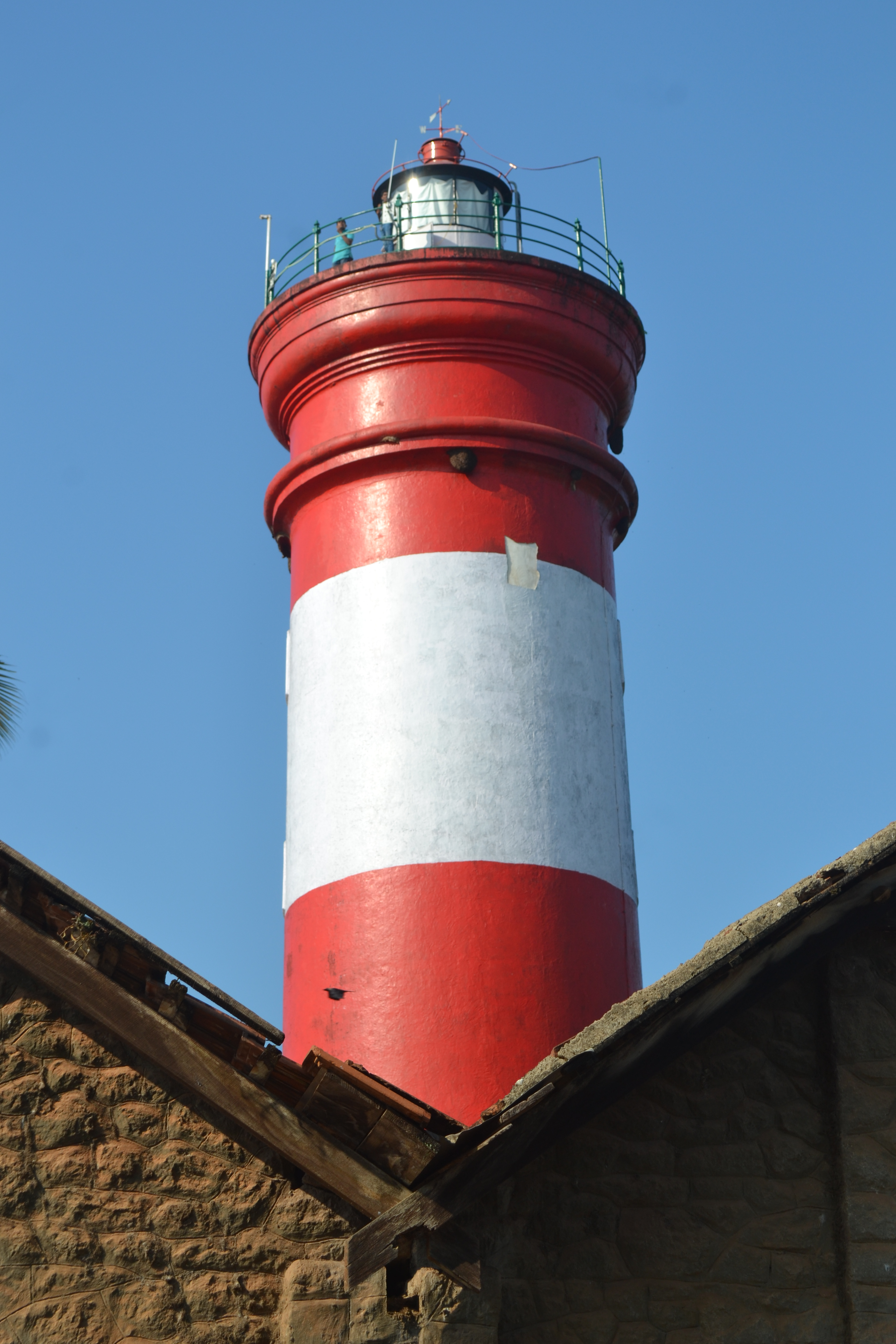
Closeup of the lighthouse

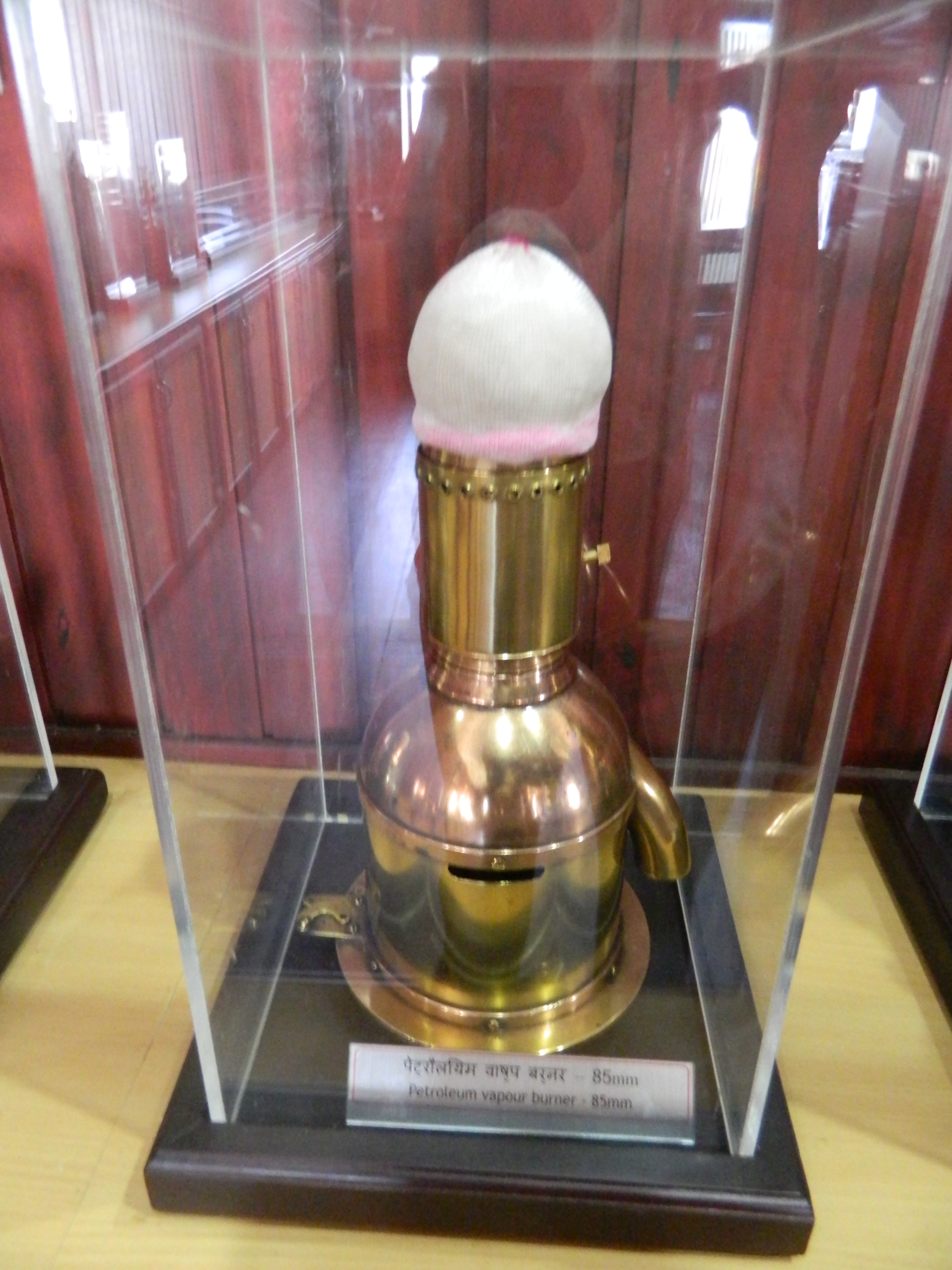
Petroleum vapour Burner used at Alappuzha Lighthouse
