= Pallana =

Pallana kumarakodi
- Village
- Pallana
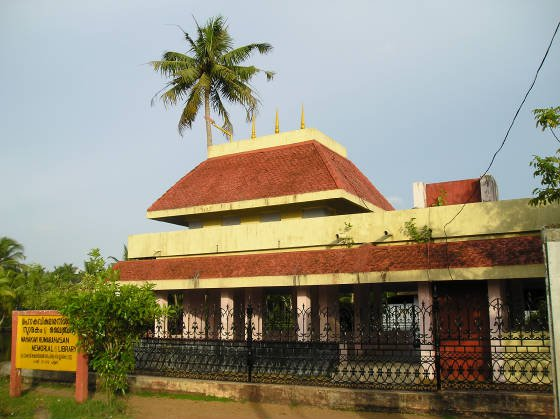
- Nickname: Pallana River
- Interactive map of Pallana
- Coordinates: 9°17′47″N 76°23′39″E
- Country: India
- State: Kerala
- District: Alappuzha
- Named for: In memory of the Eternal poet Maha Kavi Kumaran Asan

Government
  - Type: KERALA GOVT
  - Body: Panchayath

Area
  - Total: 3 km^{2} (1.2 sq mi)
  - Rank: 14
- Time zone: UTC+5:30 (IST)
- PIN: 690515
- Area code: 690515
- Website: entepallana.blogspot.com

Pallana is a village near Haripad on the shore of Arabian Sea. It is also alongside the River Pallana. National Highway 66 runs nearby. It is made famous by the fact that it is the final resting place of the great Malayalam poet Kumaranasan.

== Asan Memorial ==
Pallana is the final resting place of the poet Mahakavi Kumaran Asan, the representative of cultural renaissance in Kerala who introduced the form of poetry called "Khandakavyam" to Malayalam. It is now preserved as 'Asan Smarakom' (Memorial Tomb) by state cultural Department Government of Kerala.

== Schools ==
Mahakavi Kumaran Asan Memorial High School was established in 1976.It was later renamed to Mahakavi Kumaran Asan Memorial Higher Secondary School. There is also a library in memory of Asan, which houses books of his poetry.

== Kaviyarangu ==
The Asan Memorial Trust frequently organizes 'Kaviyarangu' (a meet of poets and literary persons in Malayalam) and conducts the speeches of famous Malayalam poets.

== Image gallery ==
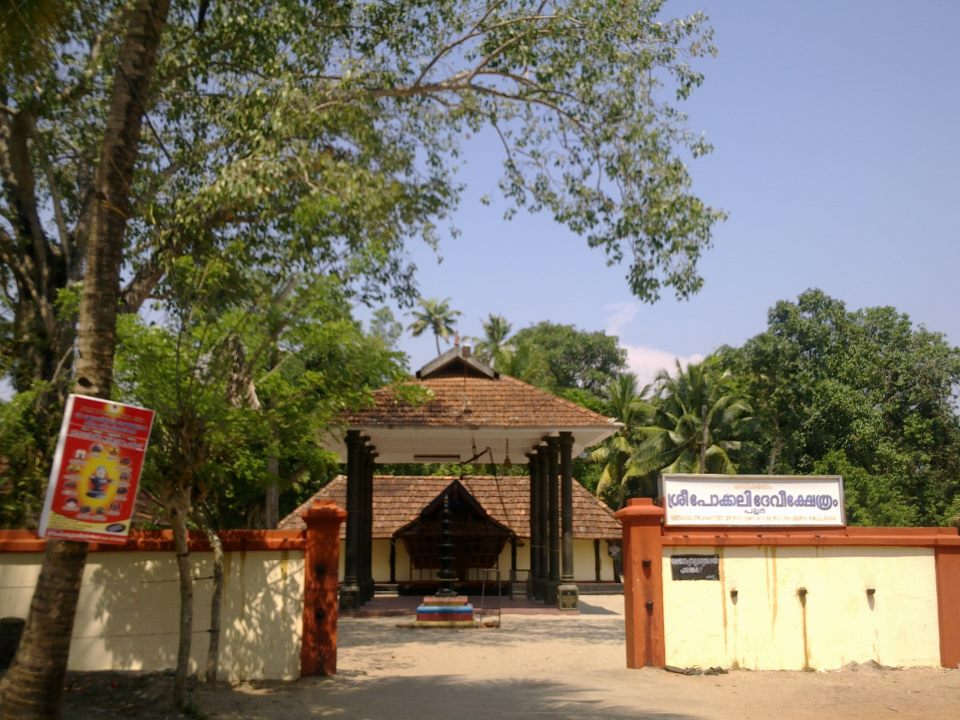
Porkkali Devi Temple

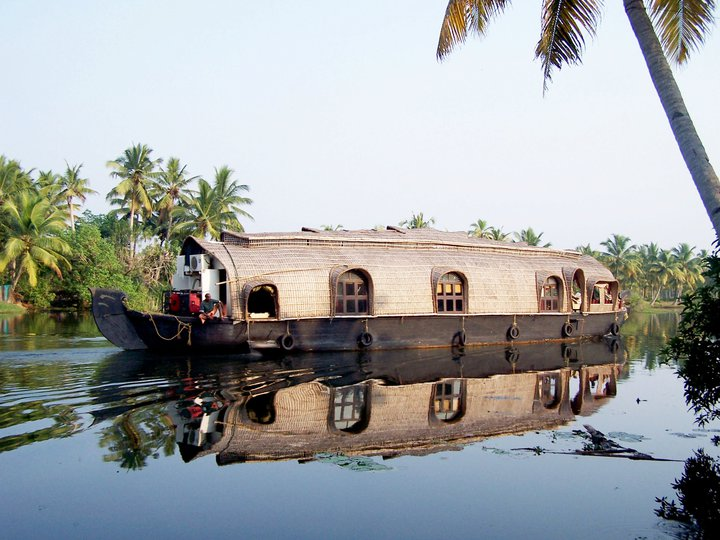
Boating in Pallana

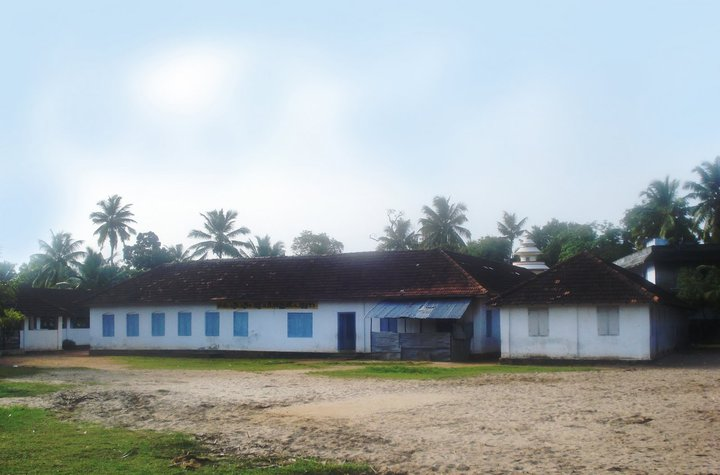
K.A.M.School

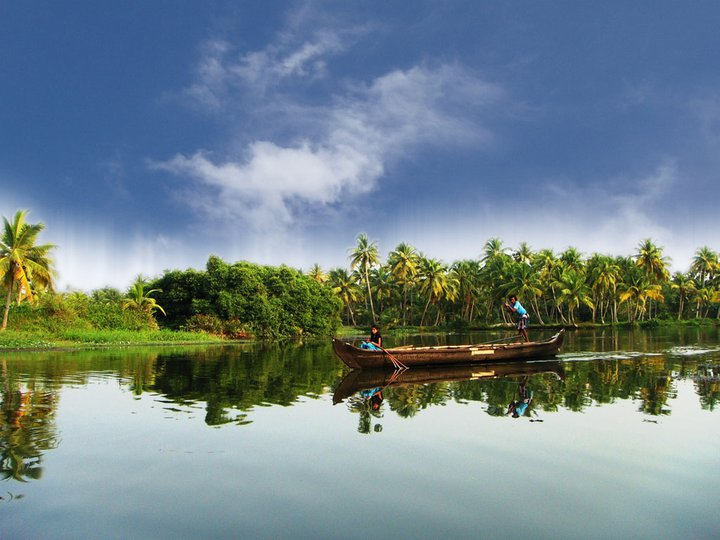
Pallana river
