= Chembirika =

Tourist place in India

Chembirika ചെമ്പിരിക്ക (also known as Chembarika-ചെമ്പരിക്ക) is a village in Chemmanad grama panchayath, Kasaragod district, Kerala State, India. It is situated 6.5 km (4.0 mi) southwest of Kasaragod Municipality and 59.5 km (37.0 mi) south of Mangaluru City, spread across the shores of the Arabian Sea (Chembirika beach) It is situated near Melparamba and is bordered by a river that separates it from the Udma region. To the east lies Kizhur, another neighboring village. Known for its beach, Chembirika is a popular destination for both locals and tourists.

== Location and Geography ==
Chembirika is located along the coast of the Arabian Sea and offers a stunning view of the coastline. The river bordering the village adds to its scenic beauty and makes it a fertile and lush area. The village is approximately 15 km away from Kasaragod town.

== Beach and Economy ==
Chembirika is famous for its beach, which is one of the main attractions of the village. The beach, with its golden sands and clear waters, is largely untouched by commercial development. However, the beach also supports a thriving local economy, with beach-based shops and small businesses that cater to the thousands of visitors who come every month. These shops offer local seafood, snacks, and souvenirs, contributing to the village's economy.

Fishing is a major livelihood for the people of Chembirika, and many villagers depend on traditional fishing techniques. The beach plays a key role in this, as it provides easy access for fishermen and is central to the local economy. The abundance of fish in the area has also led to the growth of small businesses related to the seafood industry.

== History ==
Historically, the area was part of the Kolathiri Rajas' kingdom, known as Kolathunadu, and was a hub for maritime trade due to its proximity to the Arabian Sea. The coastline, including Chembirika, has long been inhabited by traditional fishing communities, and these communities continue to play a vital role in the local economy.

Nearby, Bekal Fort, built in the 17th century by the Kolathiri Rajas, stands as a significant historical landmark. The fort was strategically constructed to protect the region from invaders and played an important military role in the area. The region also saw influences from the Sultanate of Mysore and, later, the British Empire.

== Tourism ==
The beach requires a well-planned beautification and development package from the side of Tourism department of Kerala.

A railway tunnel called Kalanad Tunnel, also known as Chembirika Tunnel, is situated at the eastern part of Chembirika. It is the longest tunnel in Kerala which was constructed by the British government 110 years ago.

The view of Chembirika Beach and the Noombil River (also known as Chembirika River), which is considered to be the smallest river in Kerala, in which the river reaches to sea over here and it is often visited by tourists from nearby localities and from other districts of Kerala and sometimes it is rarely visited by tourists from other states of India and from the rest of the world.

Melparamb is the nearest urban locality to Chembirika, at a distance of 2–3; km. There are some basic facilities like medics, education, shopping etc.

Kasaragod is the nearest major urban city to Chembirika, located 7 km away from it.

== Schools ==
- GUPS Chembirika
- Chembirika Jama-ath English Medium School

== Madrasas ==
- Dirayathul Islam Madrasa
- Sirajul Huda Sunni Madrasa
- Mubarak Madrasa

== Places of worship ==
=== Mosques ===
- Chembirika Juma Masjid, Chembirika
- Mubarak Masjid, Chembirika
- Badar Masjid, Chembirika
- Noor Masjid, Chembirika
- Mubarak Masjid, Kallamvalappu
- Maani Masjid
- Chathangai Juma Masjid

=== Temples ===
- Chandragiri Shri Chandrashekhara Temple.
- Chathankai Puthukood Tharavadu
- Kizhakekara Sree Valliyodan Tharavad

== Clubs and organizations ==
- Framez of Chembirika
- NASC Chembirika
- Naya Padosi Chembirika
- Safdar Hashmi Chembirika
- Gally Boys Chembirika
- STORE JUNCTION Chembirika

== Shops ==
- C M A Merchant (grocery shop)
- Al-Ameen Store
- K H Centre
- Hotel Chembirika
- Top Tailors
- Chembirika Flour Mills
- Rajan merchant
- Kerala State Ration Shop
- Raheem Thattukada Kadappuram
- Al Mudees Store

== Political information ==
- Chembirika comes under Udma assembly constituency for Kerala State and it is a part of Kasaragod Lok Sabha constituency after the delimitation of parliament seats in India both are led by Communist Party of India (Marxist).
- Chembirika belongs to Chemnad Grama panchayath led by Indian Union Muslim League.
- Other Political parties like Indian National League, Indian Union Muslim League, Communist Party of Indiav(Marxist), Indian National Congress, Social Democratic Party of India, Aam Aadmi Party, People's Democratic Party and Welfare Party of India have their prominent and respective presence in Chembirika.

== Transport ==
Chembirika is easily accessible by road from Kasaragod and Melparamba. The nearest major railway station is in Kasaragod, and the Mangalore International Airport, about 65 km away, serves as the closest airport for travelers. The village's coastal location, combined with its well-connected roads, makes it convenient for both locals and tourists to visit.

- The nearest railway station is Kalanad which is located 1.5 km away from Chembirika, in which the passenger (local) trains stop.
- The Kotikulam railway station is located within a short distance of 8 km.
- The major railway station is Kasaragod railway station, which is located 1.5 km away from Chembirika, which is commonly used for long journeys.
- The nearest airports are at Bajpe Airport in Karnataka State, also known as Mangaluru International Airport (IXE), which is 65 km away from Chembirika and Kannur Airport in Kerala state, also known as Kannur International Airport (CCJ), Which is 112 km away from Chembirika.
- Government transport (KSRTC) bus is the only bus transportation covering Chembirika. There are no private bus services in the area.
- Different types of taxis are available in nearby Melparamb Junction.

== Tourist landmarks ==
- Chandragiri Fort (2 km away from Chembirika)

The Chandragiri Fort is situated at Melparamb . The fort is being damaged day by day because of its age in nature and negligence and dereliction by the authorities. From here we can catch a mindblowing view of nature. The fort is listed in the list of Kerala's heritage forts.

- Kalanad Tunnel (0.5 km away from Chembirika)

It is the largest and oldest Tunnel in Kerala. The old tunnel was constructed in 1905 by the British. There is also a newer tunnel near to it, which was constructed in 2002.

- Chembirika Beach, located 0.7 km away from Chembirika town.
- Chembirika Rocks, which is also located in Chembirika Beach.
- Kallamvalappu Beach (another beach South to Chembirika Beach) with one side surrounded by Arabian Sea and the other side surrounded by Noombil River.
- Chembirika river (Noombil River)

It is a famous landmark in which the two sides of this river are two resorts, Lalit Resorts and Holiday Resorts. The river meets the sea right here. The bird's eye view of this area got a chance to feature in Kerala's tourist spot pictures.

- The Holyday Bekal Resorts Ltd(1.5 km from Chembirika)
- The Lalith Resorts Ltd (5 km from Chembirika)
- Bekal Fort (30 minutes from Chembirika)
- Chembirika Maqam Sherif, located 1.33 km away from Chembirika and 3 km away from Melparamba.
- Paisavali River (30 mins from Chembirika)
