= Thanni Beach =

One of the important beach in Kerala

- Beach
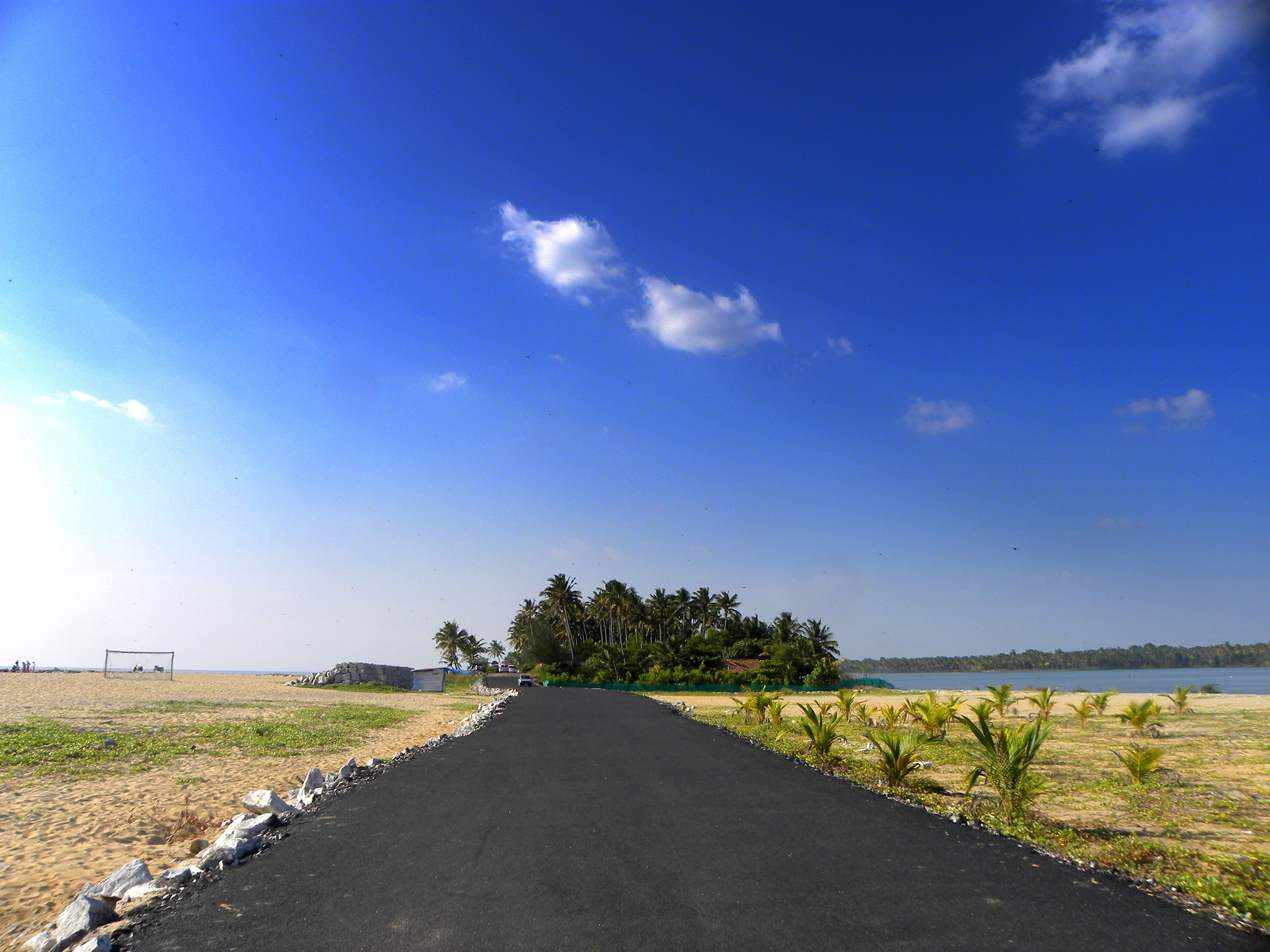
- Coastal Road near Thanni Beach

- Coordinates: 8.824°N 76.641°E
- Location: Mukkam, Kollam, India

Dimensions
  - Length: 400+ m
- Hazard rating: Low
- Access: Bus Station - 11.2 m, Railway Station - 7.1 km, Ferry Terminal - 11.2 km

Thanni Beach is a beach situated approximately 10 kilometers from Kollam City in Kerala, India. Situated beside the Kollam Coastal Road, the beach is also accessible from both Kollam Beach and Mayyanad via the Thanni Bridge, making it popular among locals and tourists alike. Tetrapod breakwaters, locally called Pulimuttu, line the shore to reduce wave intensity and create a safe swimming area. Uniquely, a thin landmass separates the beach from Paravur Lake, offering visitors the chance to experience both backwaters and beachfront in close proximity.
