= Geography of Kollam =

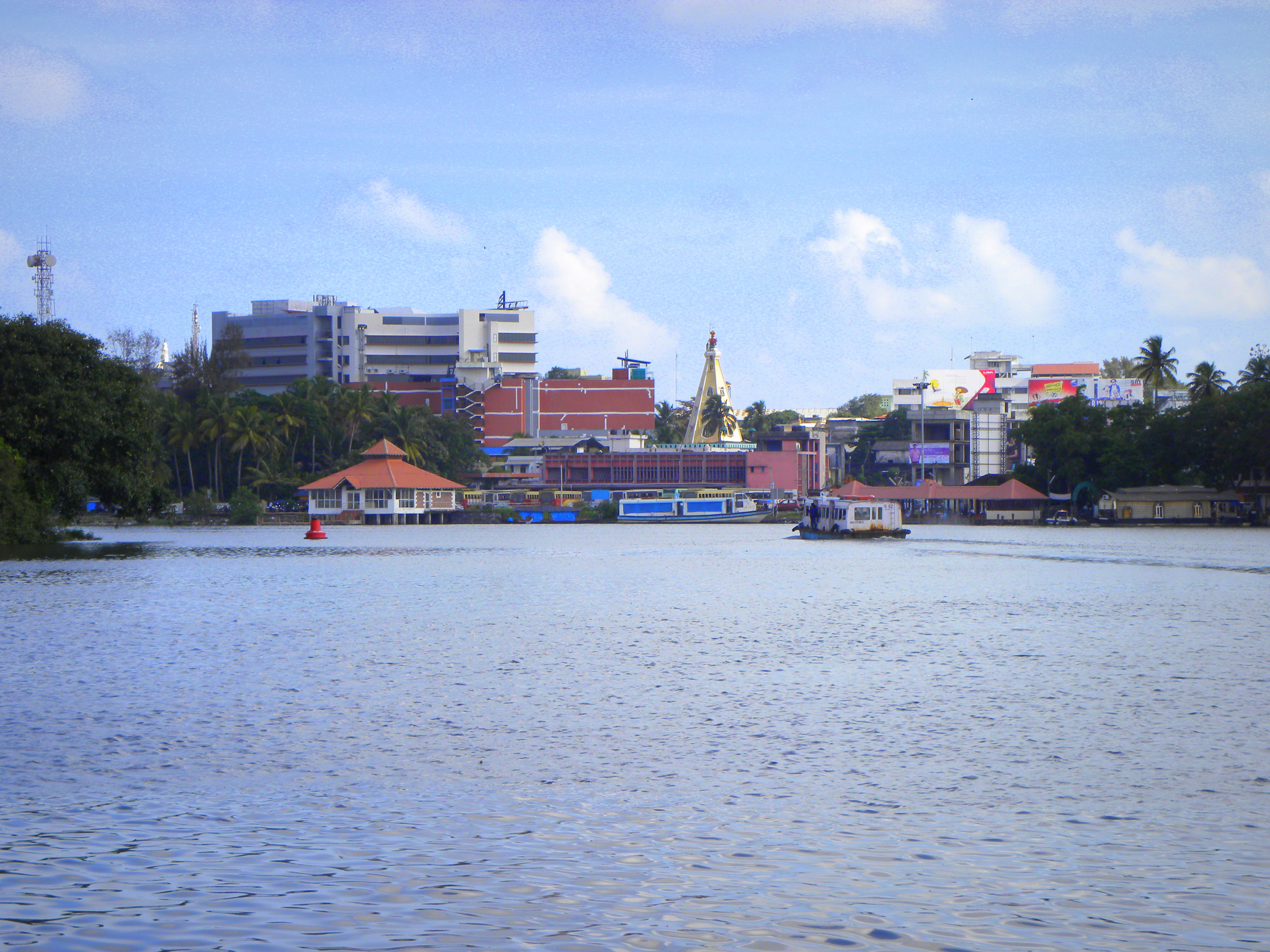
View of Ashtamudi Lake and Kollam city

City of Kollam or Quilon is a Port city in South India and was the commercial capital of erstwhile Kingdom of Travancore. It is situated on the Laccadive Sea coast of South Kerala. The city is known as the "Gateway to the backwaters of Kerala". The city lies on the banks of Ashtamudi Lake, Kerala's second largest lake, on the Arabian sea coast. Major parts of Kollam city are covered by Ashtamudi Lake.

== Geographic Location ==
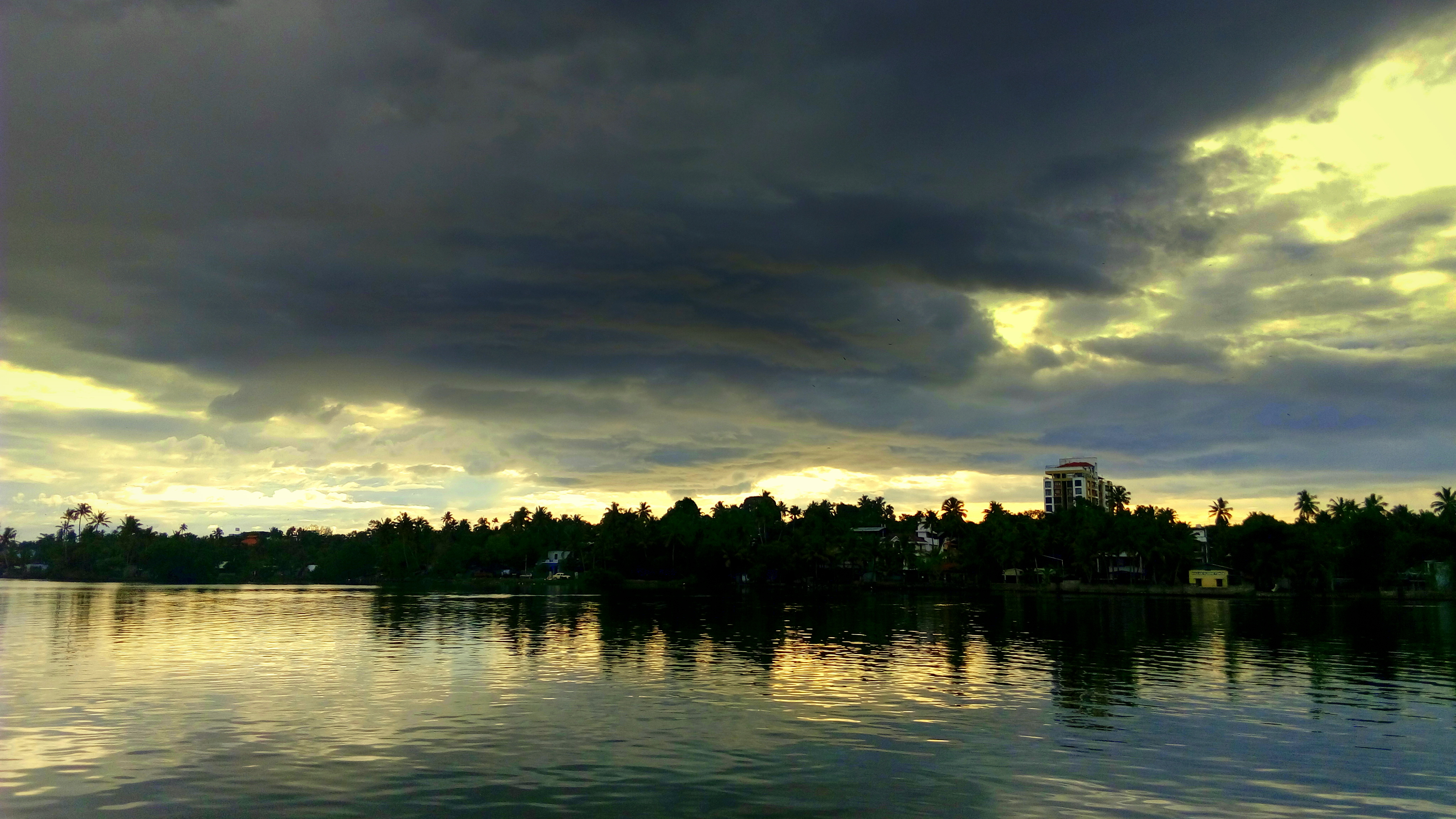
Ashtamudi Lake view from Asramam Adventure Park

The city of Kollam lies at 8.887082°N 76.590691°E with an average altitude of 3 metres. The average rainfall is 270 cm yearly. The city is surrounded by Arabian Sea in the west, Ashtamudi Lake and panchayats of Neendakara and Thrikkaruva in north, Mayyanad panchayat in the south and Thrikkovilvattom and Kottamkara panchayats in east. The Kollam coast is a blessed coastal belt with mineral sand deposits. The backwaters of Ashtamudi, thick mangroves on its coasts, beaches, estuaries, scattered islands and pleasant climate are making Kollam as one of the best sea side tourist destinations in Kerala.

== Climate ==
The maximum average temperature of the city in the summer season is 31 degree Celsius and the minimum temperature recorded is 23 degrees Celsius. Under the Köppen climate classification, the city features a Tropical monsoon climate.

Climate data for Kollam
Month	Jan	Feb	Mar	Apr	May	Jun	Jul	Aug	Sep	Oct	Nov	Dec	Year
Mean daily maximum °C (°F)	31 (88)	31 (88)	32 (90)	32 (90)	31 (88)	29 (84)	29 (84)	29 (84)	29 (84)	30 (86)	29 (84)	30 (86)	30 (86)
Mean daily minimum °C (°F)	23 (73)	23 (73)	25 (77)	26 (79)	25 (77)	24 (75)	24 (75)	24 (75)	24 (75)	24 (75)	24 (75)	23 (73)	24 (75)
Average precipitation mm (inches)	18 (0.7)	26 (1.0)	53 (2.1)	147 (5.8)	268 (10.6)	518 (20.4)	381 (15.0)	248 (9.8)	209 (8.2)	300 (11.8)	208 (8.2)	51 (2.0)	2,427 (95.6)
Average precipitation days (≥ 0.1 mm)	1	2	4	8	11	21	19	16	12	12	8	3	117
Source: Weather2Travel

== Landforms and Waterbodies ==
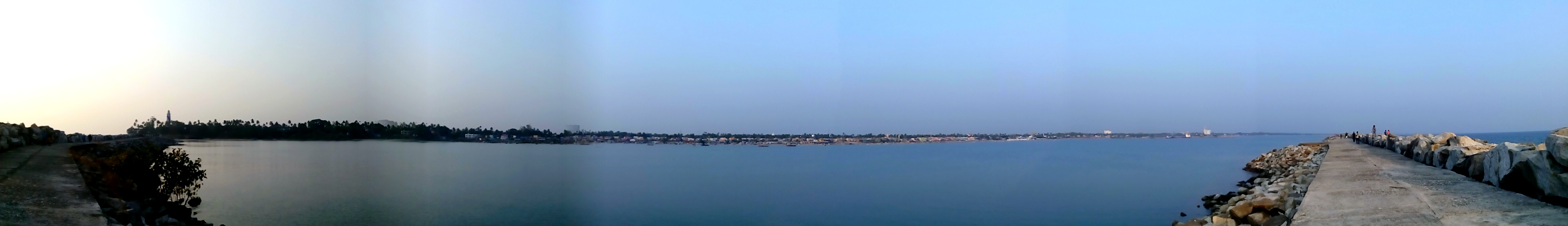
Panorama of Tangasseri

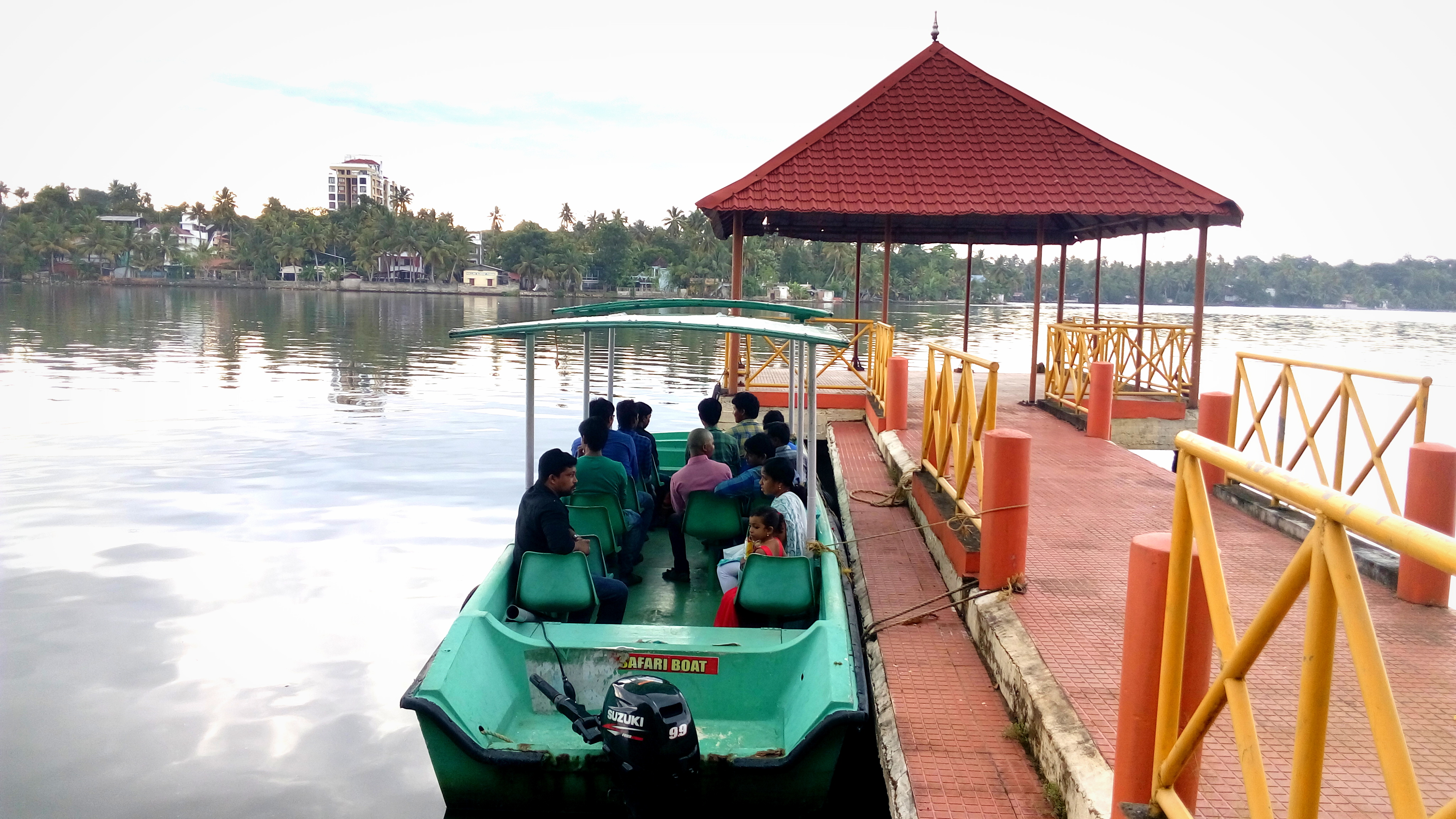
View of Ashtamudi Lake from Adventure Park boat jetty in Asramam

Kollam is known as the Prince of Arabian Sea. Several beaches, estuaries, backwaters and islands are there in the city. In 2015, Kollam got selected as the least polluted city in India. The mineral sand deposit in Kollam coasts worth several thousand crores of Indian rupee.

=== Islands of Kollam ===
A good number of scattered islands are there in Ashtamudi Lake in Kollam. These islands are the real beauty of Kollam backwaters. Most of these islands are potential tourism spots in the state. Even Indian Railways also planning to develop one of the islands in Kollam for a tourism project. There are big as well as small islands which are inhabited and uninhabited by human beings. The important islands in Kollam are:

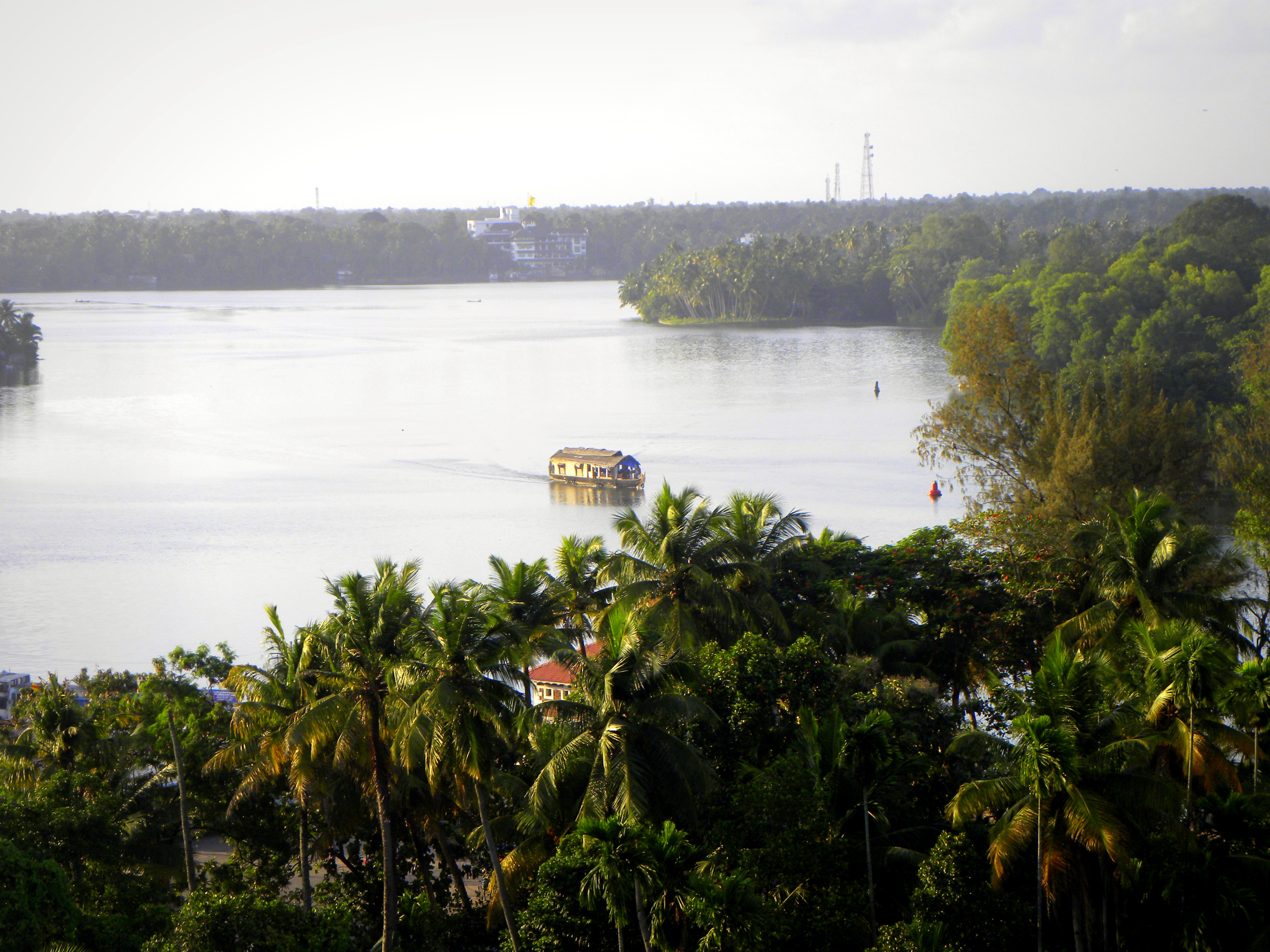
Ashtamudi backwaters - View from RP Mall

- Munroe Island
- Chavara Thekkumbhagom
- St. Sebastian Island
- San Thome Island
- Vincent Island
- Our Lady of Fatima Island
- Pezhumthuruth
- Kakkathuruth
- Pattamthuruth
- Paliyanthuruthu (Palliyamthuruthu)
- Neettum thuruth
- Puthenthuruth
- Poothuruth
- Pannaykkathuruth
- Veluthuruth
- Neeleswaram thuruth

=== Beaches in Kollam ===
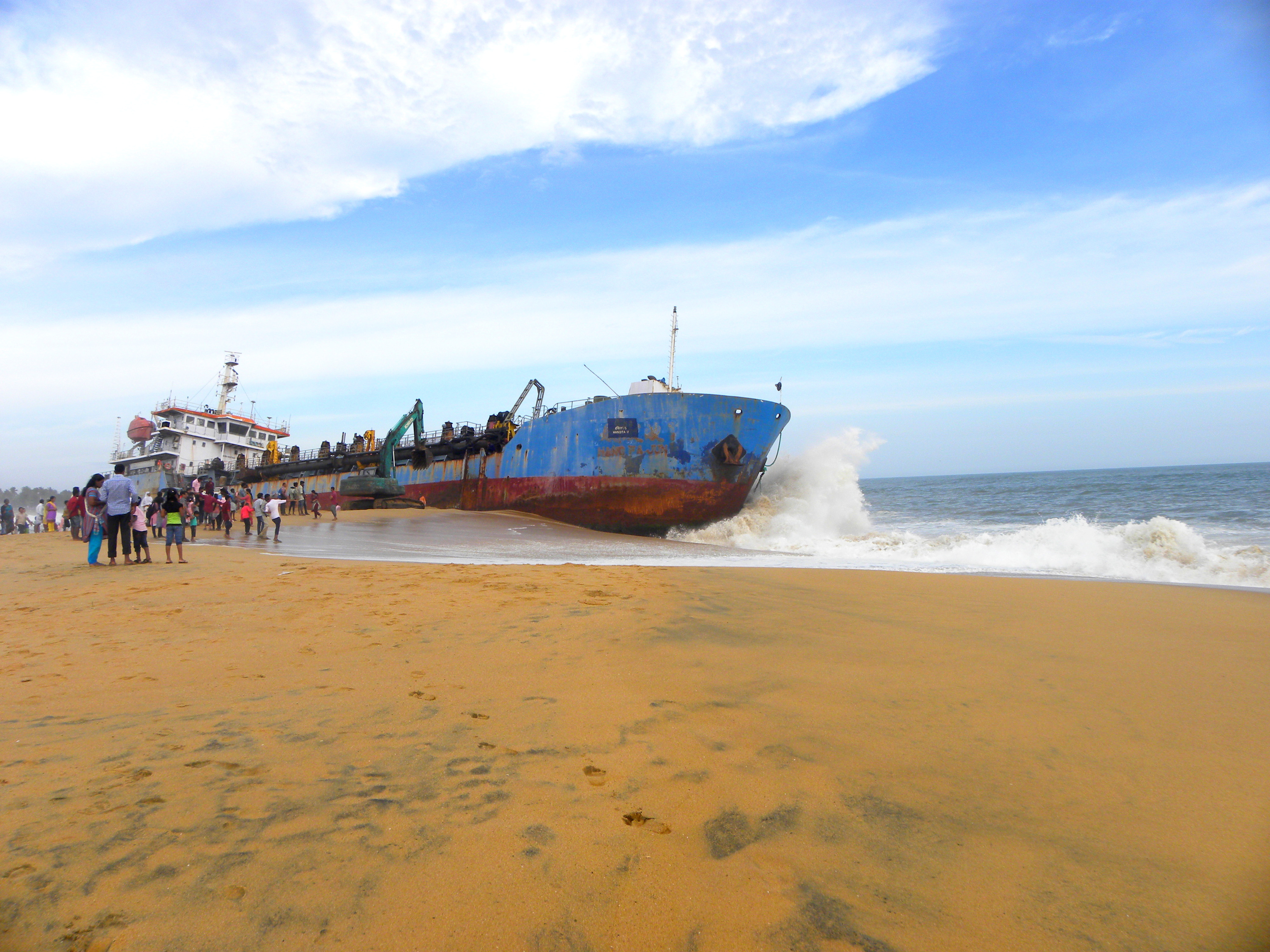
A dredger ship washed up on the Mundakkal Beach

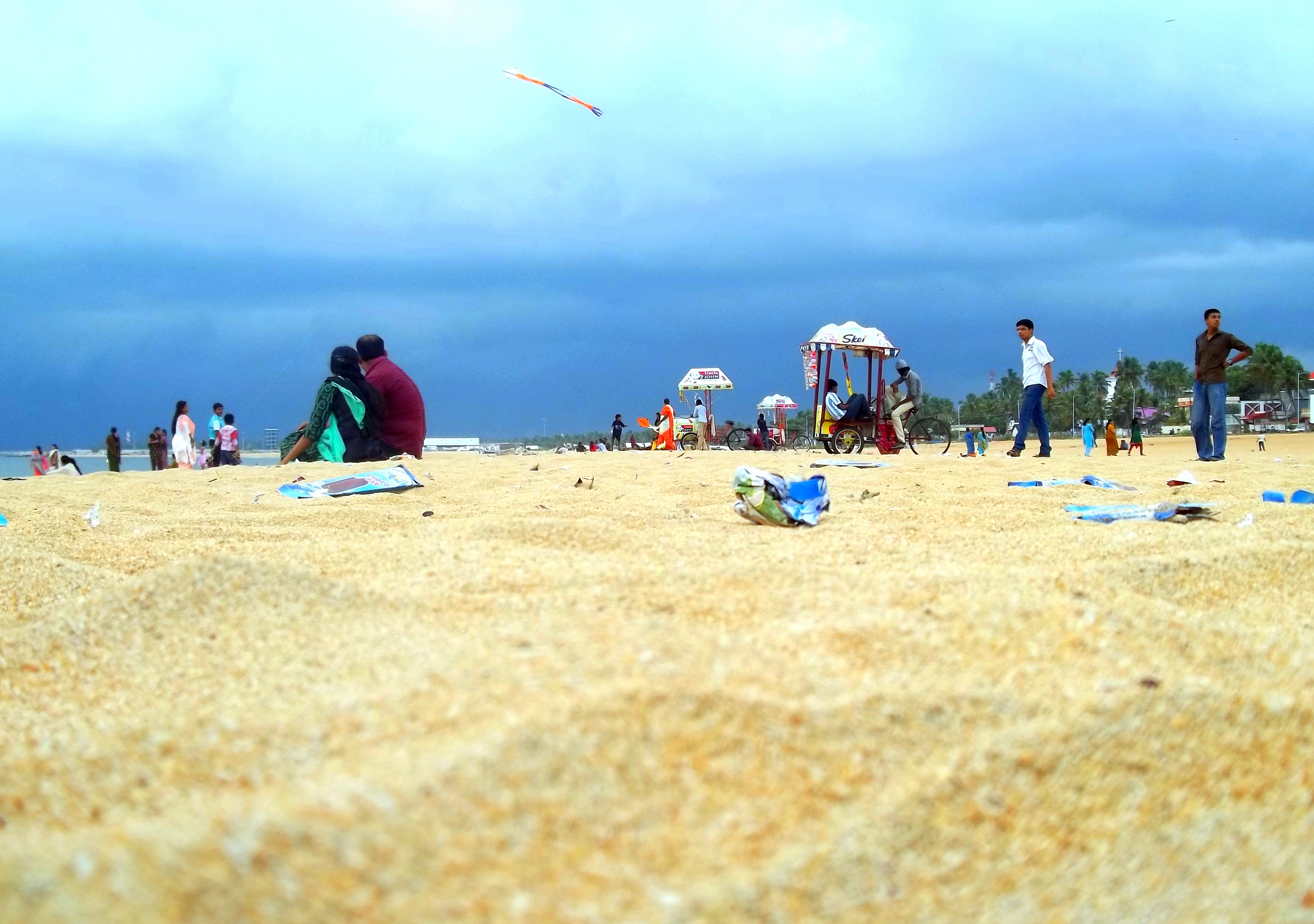
Kollam Beach - An evening view

Kollam is land of serene beaches. The white sand beaches take the prime spot in Kollam’s tourism map. Popularly known Kollam Beach, Thirumullavaram Beach and Mundakkal Beach are the three important beaches in the city. Several other small beaches are there on the coastline of Kollam namely Tangasseri, Vaddy, Thanni etc.

Kollam Beach is on the south-west area of the city. The beach also features a children's park, the Mahatma Gandhi Park and an under construction Marine Aquarium. Kollam beach is one among the few beaches in Kerala with a lifeguard outpost.

Thirumullavaram Beach is on the north-west coast of Kollam city. The beach is ideal for early morning walks Thirumullavaram beach is very famous for conducting the Karkidaka Vavubali rituals. Thousands of devotees arrive on the beach to perform the Vavubali Tharpanam every year.
