= Thirumullavaram Beach =

Popular beach in India

Thirumullavaram Beach തിരുമുല്ലവാരം ബീച്ച്
- Beach
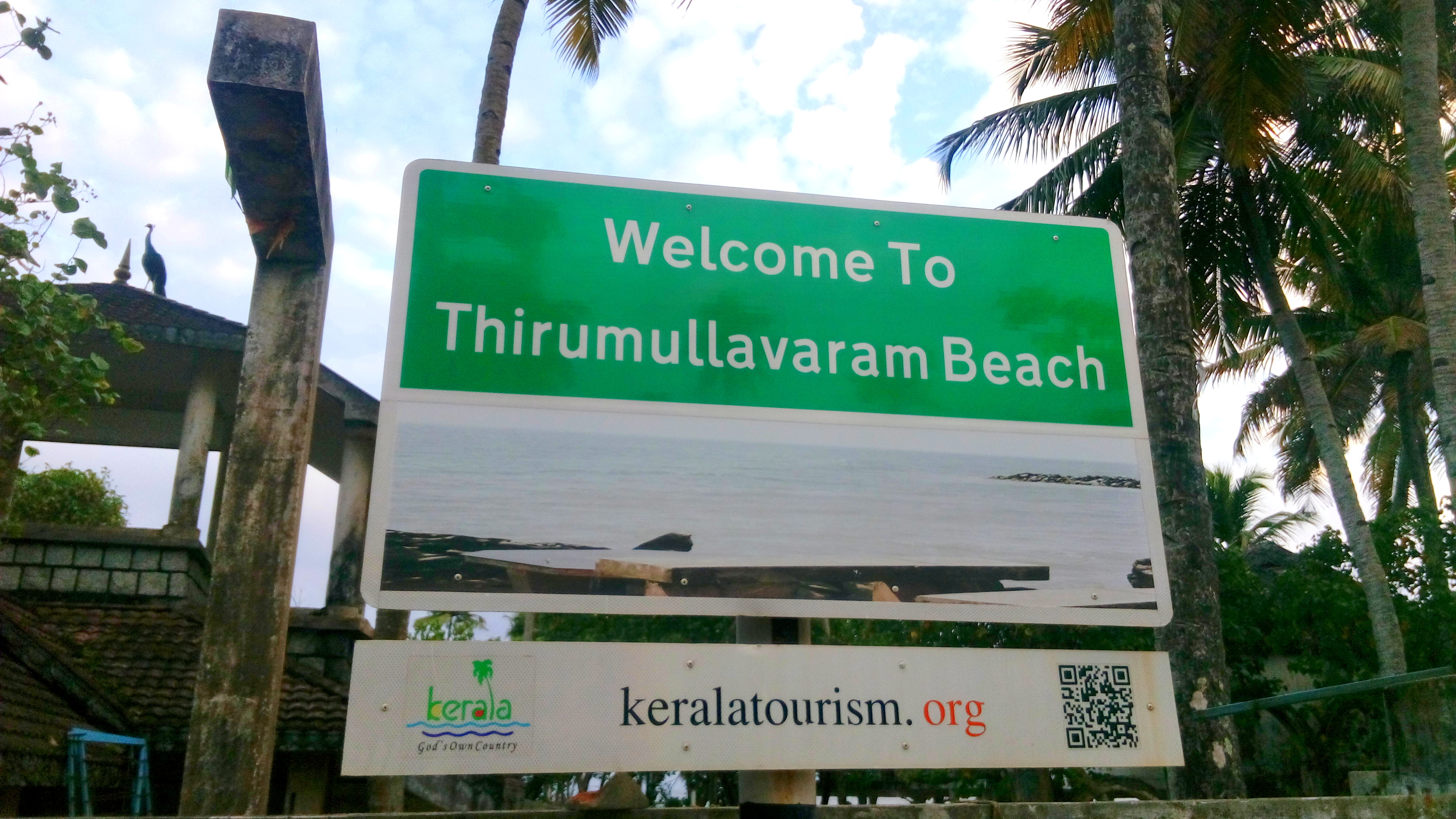
- Navigation Board at Thirumullavaram Beach

- Location within Kollam Location within Kerala
- Coordinates: 8°53′41″N 76°33′13″E
- Location: Thirumullavaram, Kollam, India

Dimensions
  - Length: 100+ m
- Hazard rating: Low
- Access: Bus Station - 4.2 km, Railway Station - 5.5 km, Ferry Terminal - 4.2 km

Thirumullavaram Beach (Malayalam: തിരുമുല്ലവാരം ബീച്ച്), is one of the popular beaches in the city of Kollam and a tourist destination in the state of Kerala. The beach is situated at Thirumullavaram, an important neighbourhood of Kollam city. The beach is very famous for conducting the Karkidaka Vavubali rituals. Thousands of devotees arrive on the beach to perform the Vavubali Tharpanam every year. It is one of the most attractive beaches located in South India.

== Importance of Thirumullavaram beach ==
Thirumullavaram beach is one of two main beaches in the Kollam (known as the 'Cashew Capital of the World'). The beach area is full of coconut palms which makes the place a shady and quiet silent place. The beach is ideal for early morning walks The beach is ideal for swimming and sun bathing and no danger zones are identified. The beach is connected with all the major roads around the state and it can be easily accessed to reach the place. The taste of local cuisine that is mostly flavoured with coconut and spices like cardamom, black pepper, cloves, cinnamon and ginger are also attract a good number of visitors. A water hillock named Njarazhcha Para which means Sunday Rock, is another allurement for the tourists visiting here. During low tides, this hillock can be seen clearly from the shore about one and a half km into the sea. As per the 2018 study report by Central Marine Fisheries Research Institute(CMRFRI) of India, Thirumullavaram beach is one of the 16 best-kept beaches in India, topper from the state of Kerala.

== Location ==
The beach is situated at 6 km away from the heart of Kollam city. It is a picnic centre and has frequent bus connections to the city. Kollam KSRTC Bus station is situated at a distance of 5 from here. The nearest rail head is Kollam Junction railway station, which is 7 km away. The nearest airport is Thiruvananthapuram International Airport which is at a distance of 80 km.

=== Major road destinations ===
1. Thangassery - 3 km
2. Kollam KSRTC Bus station - 5 km
3. Kollam Beach - 6 km
4. Chinnakada - 6 km
5. Kollam Junction railway station - 7 km
6. Karunagappalli - 22 km
7. Paravur - 29 km
8. Paravur railway station - 29 km
9. Thekkumbhagam beach - 33 km
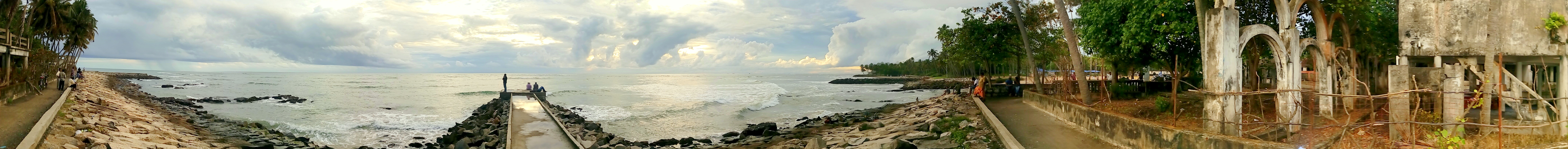
Panorama of Thirumullavaram beach, in September 2015
