= Kollam Kite Club =

Kite flying club in India

Kite Club, Kollam
- കൊല്ലം കൈറ്റ് ക്ലബ്ബ്
- Founded at: Kollam, India
- Type: Kite club
- Legal status: Club
- Purpose: Promoting kite flying
- Headquarters: Kollam city
- Location: Beach Kollam
- Coordinates: 8.872186°N 76.594006°E

Kollam Kite Club or Kite Club, Kollam is a registered kite flying club situated at Kollam city in India. The club is mainly focused on kite flying, kite workshops etc. The main recreational area of Kollam Kite Club is Kollam Beach in the city.

== Importance ==
Kite flying is now a part of Kollam's culture. People of Kollam are actively involved in kite-flying activities at Kollam Beach every day. KiteLife Foundation, founded by Mr. Rajesh Nair, is now organizing good number of kite-related workshops and activities in Kollam. KiteLife Foundation is organizing Kite flying festivals in Kollam every year. Kollam and Shimoga chapters of KiteLife Foundation are having a good number of memberships also. National Kite Flying Festival-2014 happened at Kollam. Kite Making Classes are also conducted by various organizations in the city.

== National Kite Flying Festival 2019 ==
The college students union of TKMCE, Kollam is organizing National Kite Flying Festival on 17 March 2019 at Kollam Beach. The students union aims to spread awareness about the plight of Kollam's sinking island, Munroe Island, and also attempts to break the Asian record for the maximum number of kites flown simultaneously.

== See also ==
- Kollam Port
- Paravur
