= Thirumullavaram =

Thirumullavarum Thirumullavaram
- Neighbourhood
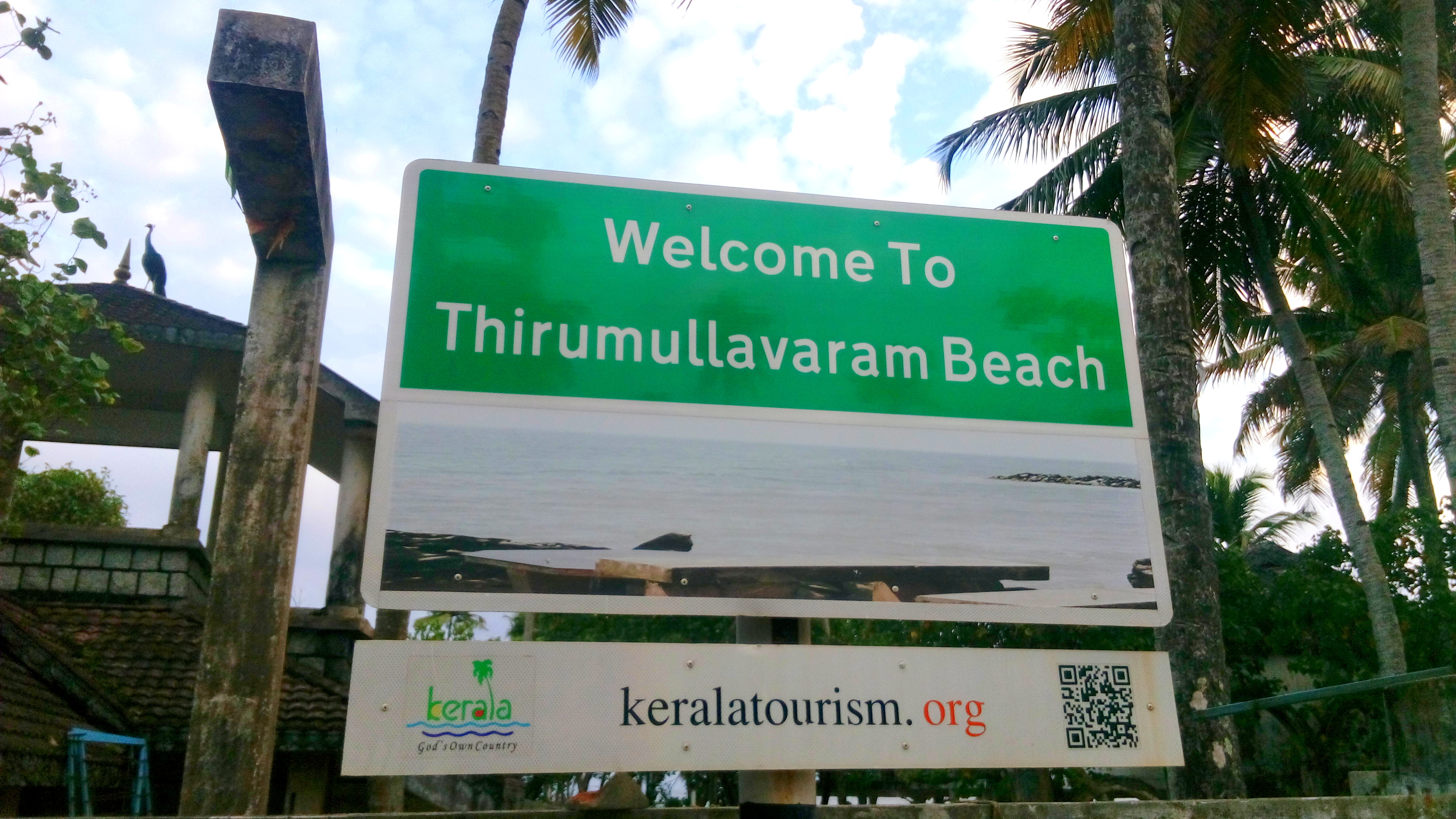
- Thirumullavaram beach

- Location in Kollam, India Thirumullavarum (Kerala)
- Coordinates: 8.9026254°N 76.5611052°E
- Country: India
- State: Kerala
- District: Kollam

Population (2001)
  - Total: 4,115

Languages
  - Official: Malayalam
- Time zone: UTC+5:30 (IST)
- PIN: 691012
- Telephone code: 0474
- Vehicle registration: KL-
- Nearest city: Kollam
- Literacy: 91.18%
- Lok Sabha constituency: Kollam
- Vidhan Sabha constituency: Kollam

Thirumullavaram is a part of Kollam UA in the state of Kerala, a state in south India. It is situated 6 km north of the city of Kollam. It is best known for a calm beach safe for swimming. Discovery Channel has selected Thirumullavaram beach as one of the 10 beautiful beaches in the world.

== Etymology ==
The place got its name from "Thirumallanmar", the bodyguards of the erstwhile King of Travancore - Sri Marthanda Varma. Thirumullavarum, because of its scenic beauty, was one of the places where the King used to spend his leisure time. Another etymology says that, this place got the name in Treta Yuga. SEETHA DEVI brought the MULLAPOO which were in his hair, due to give signal for Sreerama, by the time of the journey to Lanka by PUSHPAKA VIMANA under Ravana's custody. The MULLAPOO dropped at this place. Thus the place got its name THIRUMULLAVARAM.

== Attractions ==
The major landmark of Thirumullavaram is Sri Maha Vishnu Swamy temple. Folklore has it that the temple was one of the seven established by Parashuram himself, Parashuram is believed to have raised Kerala from the sea. This temple has two deities, Vishnu and Siva. Vishnu is facing on the west and Siva on the east, constructed as per Kerala temple architectural style. The sreekovil is in circle shape and out of the nalamblam sub deity shrines such as Bhuvaneswari devi, Rakshas and Naga devethas are located and there is a gold dwajam (kodimaram) in front of balikkalpura. There is a temple pond behind the temple, The specialty about the Temple pond is that even though it is near to the sea shore the water is NOT SALTY.

The annual festival of this temple is celebrated on “Atham” day of Meenam (March–April). This festival will last for ten days from Rohini to Atham. With the procession of more than forty caparisoned elephants. and the famous Kadal Pooram. The beach is immensely popular owing to the name from the Vishnu temple close to it.

Temple re-construction work under Devaswom Board is going on for years.

During the Karkadaka Vaavu season - Malayalam era (July–August), more than 6 lakhs offer oblation to the manes every year to pray for their dear departed on the new moon day in the month of in Thirumullavaram beach.

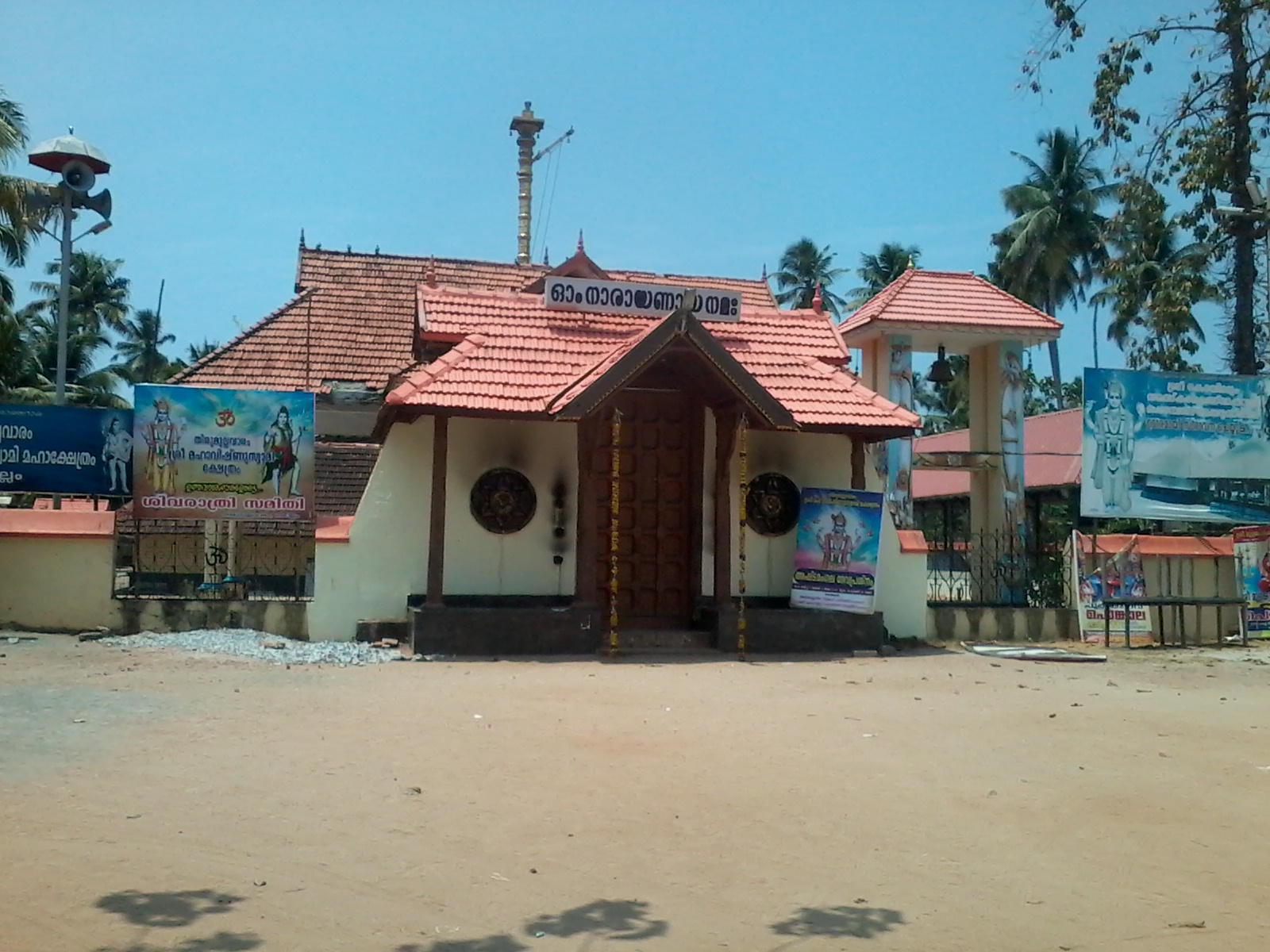
Thirumullavaram Sri Maha Vishnu SwamyTemple

The beach is clean, refreshing and scenic, close to the Kollam city. It is 6 km from the Kollam railway station and 2 km from the Thangasseri harbour.

Discovery Channel has selected Thirumullavaram beach as one of the 10 beautiful beaches in the world.

== Education ==
There is one lower primary school (Devaswom board L.P school) and one high school (St. Johns U.P school) in Thirumullavaram.

There is one college which was run by Lions international club (Currently not working).

== 2004 Tsunami ==
On 26 December 2004, the world witnessed the devastating power of tsunami, affecting many countries, bordering the Indian Ocean region. This has caused significant changes in the shallow and intertidal regions of the Indian coast, especially the Andaman and Nicobar Islands, Tamil Nadu, Kerala and Pondicherry. Many locals crowded near the beach once the sea water retreated. As they were watching the giant waves came back with force within ten to fifteen minutes. The wall of the temple pond was damaged partially. A photographer who was standing on the wall escaped narrowly from getting hurt. Apart from that no major damages were there.
