= Mahatma Gandhi Park =

Park in Kollam, Kerala, India

Mahatma Gandhi Park, Kollam
- MG Park, Kollam
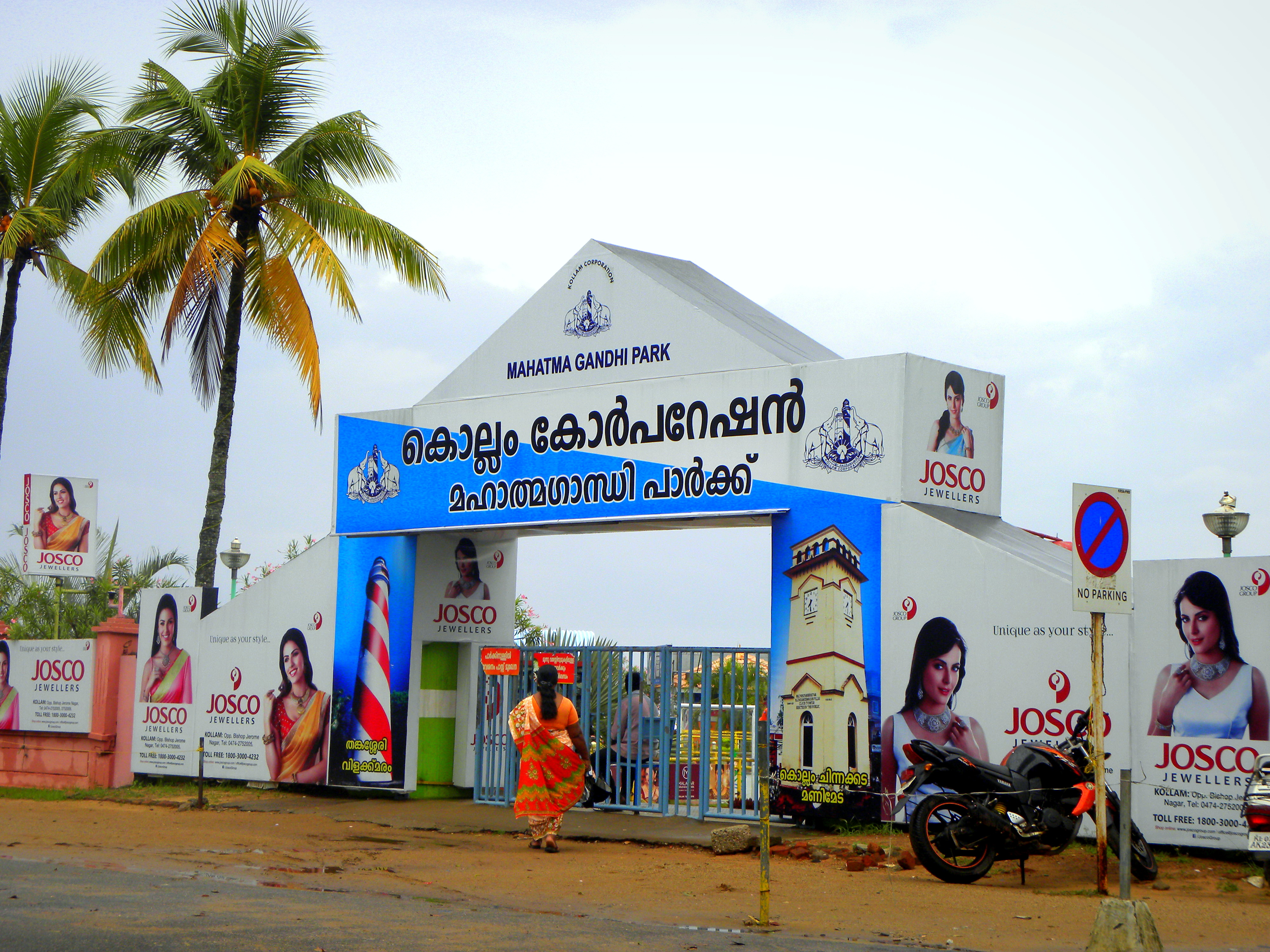
- Mahatma Gandhi Park Entrance
- Interactive map of Mahatma Gandhi Park, Kollam
- Type: Public park
- Location: Near Kollam Beach
- Nearest city: Kollam, India
- Coordinates: 8.874601°N 76.593326°E
- Opened: 1 January 1967
- Status: Open all year
- Public transit: Bus Station - 3.0 km, Railway Station - 2.3 km, Ferry Terminal - 3.0 km
- Road access: Coastal Road

Mahatma Gandhi Park (also known as MG park) is a public park situated near Kollam Beach in the city of Kollam, Kerala, India. It is about 2 km away from Chinnakada - The city centre of 'Cashew Capital of the World'. It is one of the main centres of recreational activities in Kollam city. The park is owned by Kollam Municipal Corporation and is operated by Rural Tourism Development Company (RUTODEC), a private firm, on contract for a period of five years for maintenance. 'The Quilon Beach' five star hotel(Formerly known as Beach Orchid) is located near to this park.

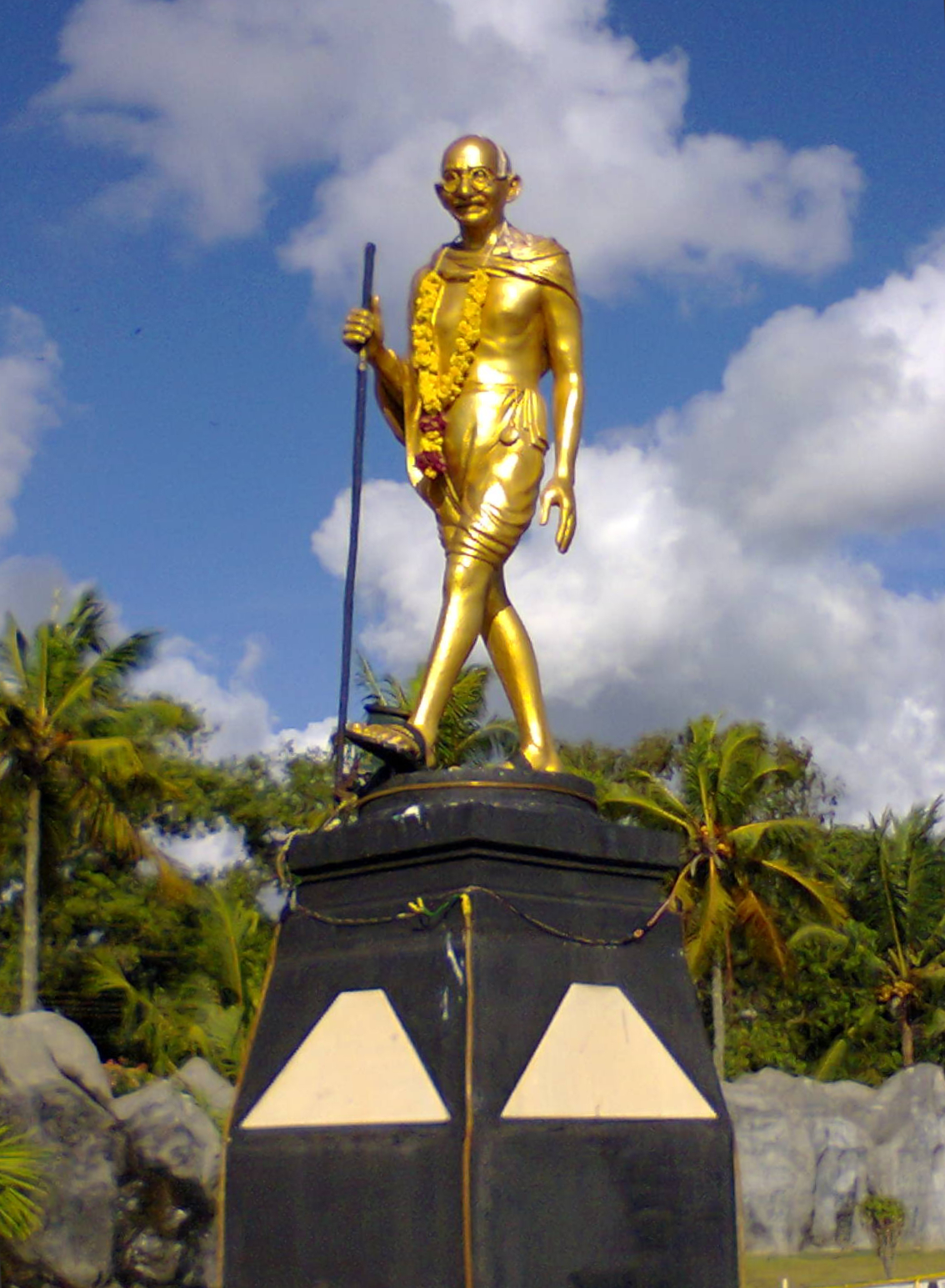
Mahatma Gandhi statue inside the park.

== History ==
Mahatma Gandhi Park was opened on 1 January 1967 by the then Vice President of India, Zakir Hussein. There was a park complex comprised a deer park and an aquarium then, but closed down due to the troubles from anti-socials. Later in 2010, Kollam Municipal Corporation has allotted money for the renovation of the park and the renovated park was inaugurated by Mrs. Prasanna Earnest, the then Mayor of Kollam, marks the Golden jubilee of MG Beach park at Kollam.

== Facilities ==
- Swimming pool
- Observatory
- Bowling machine
- Sweet Shops & Cafeteria
- Water Fountains
- Artificial Waterfalls

== See also ==
- Kollam
- Kollam Beach
- Children's Park, Kollam
