= Kollam Beach =

One of the important beach in Kerala

- Beach
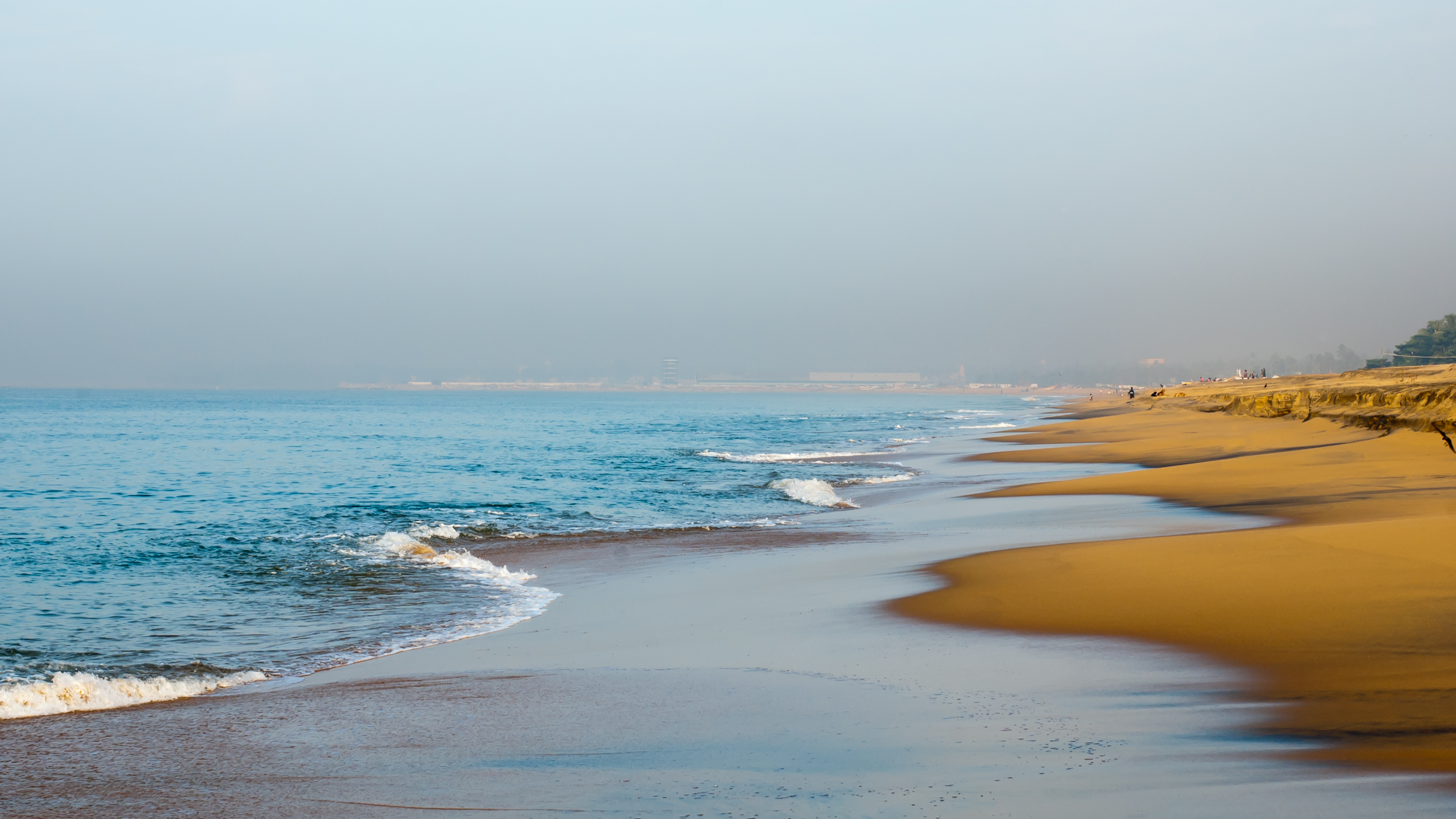
- Kollam Beach

- Location within Kollam Location within Kerala
- Coordinates: 8°52′26″N 76°35′33″E
- Location: Thamarakulam, Kollam, India

Dimensions
  - Length: 2,300+ m
- Patrolled by: Lifeguards
- Hazard rating: High
- Access: Bus Station - 3.1 m, Railway Station - 2.4 km, Ferry Terminal - 3.1 km

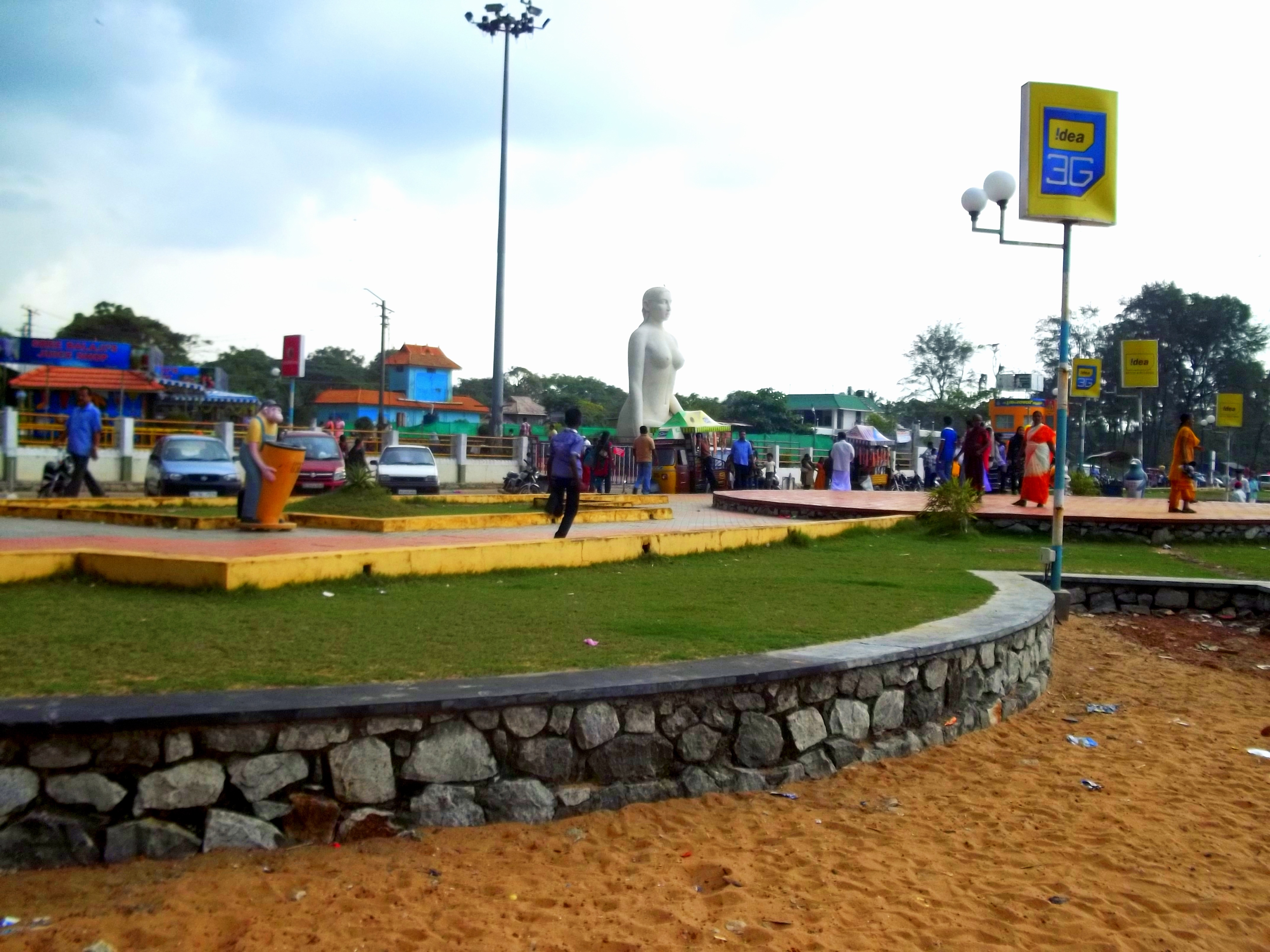
Mahatma Gandhi Park in Kollam Beach

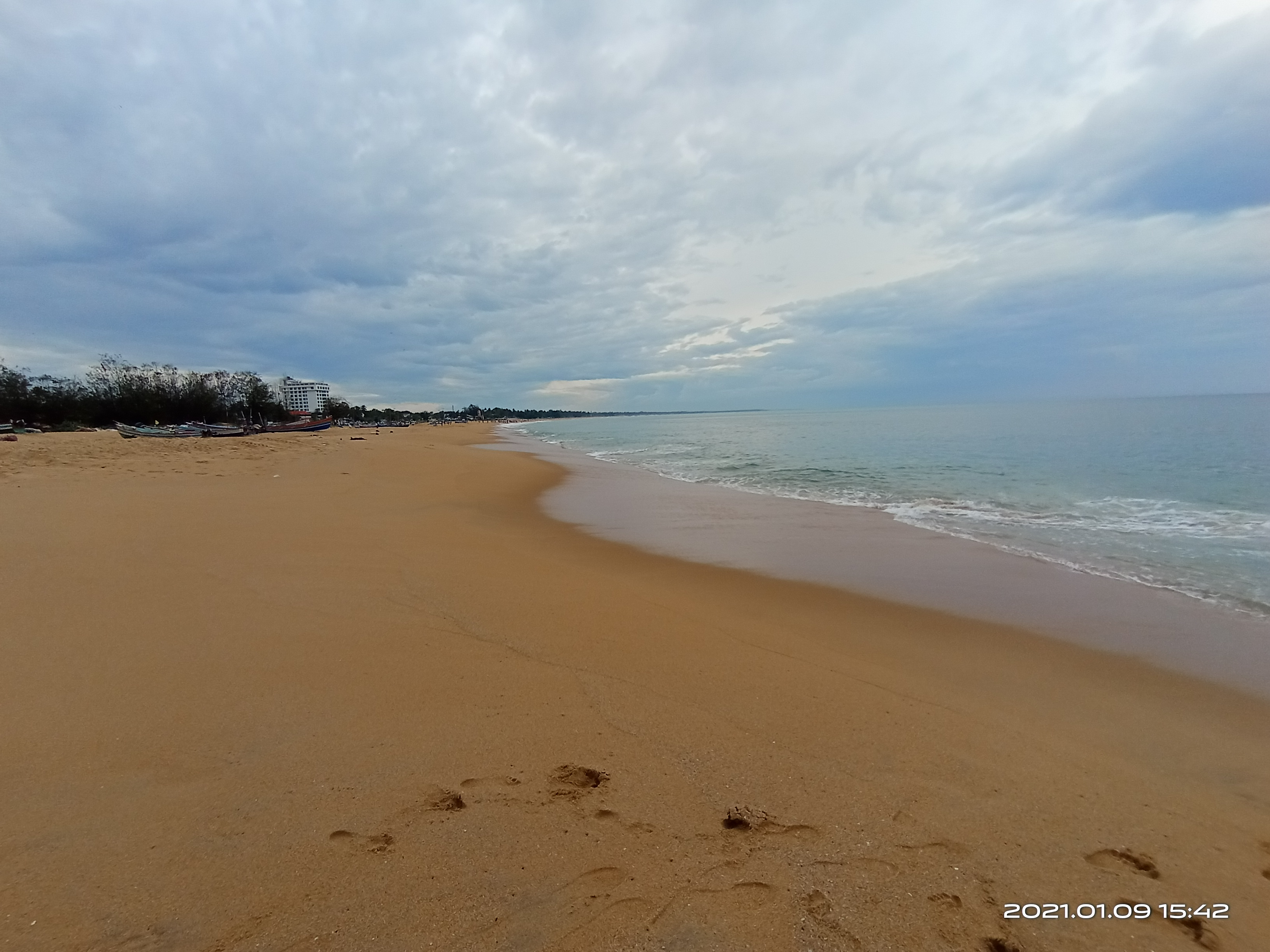

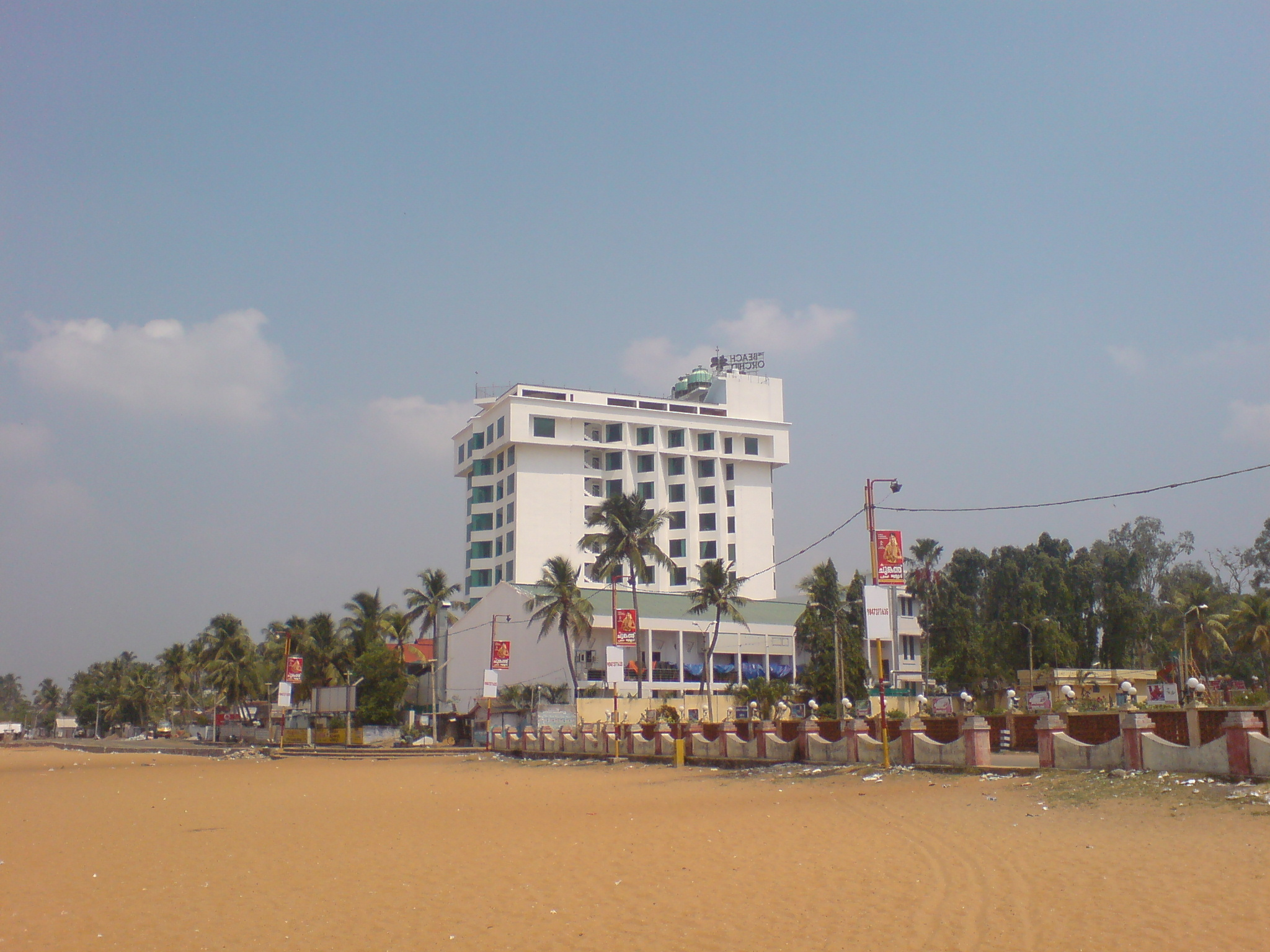
Snap from Kollam Beach

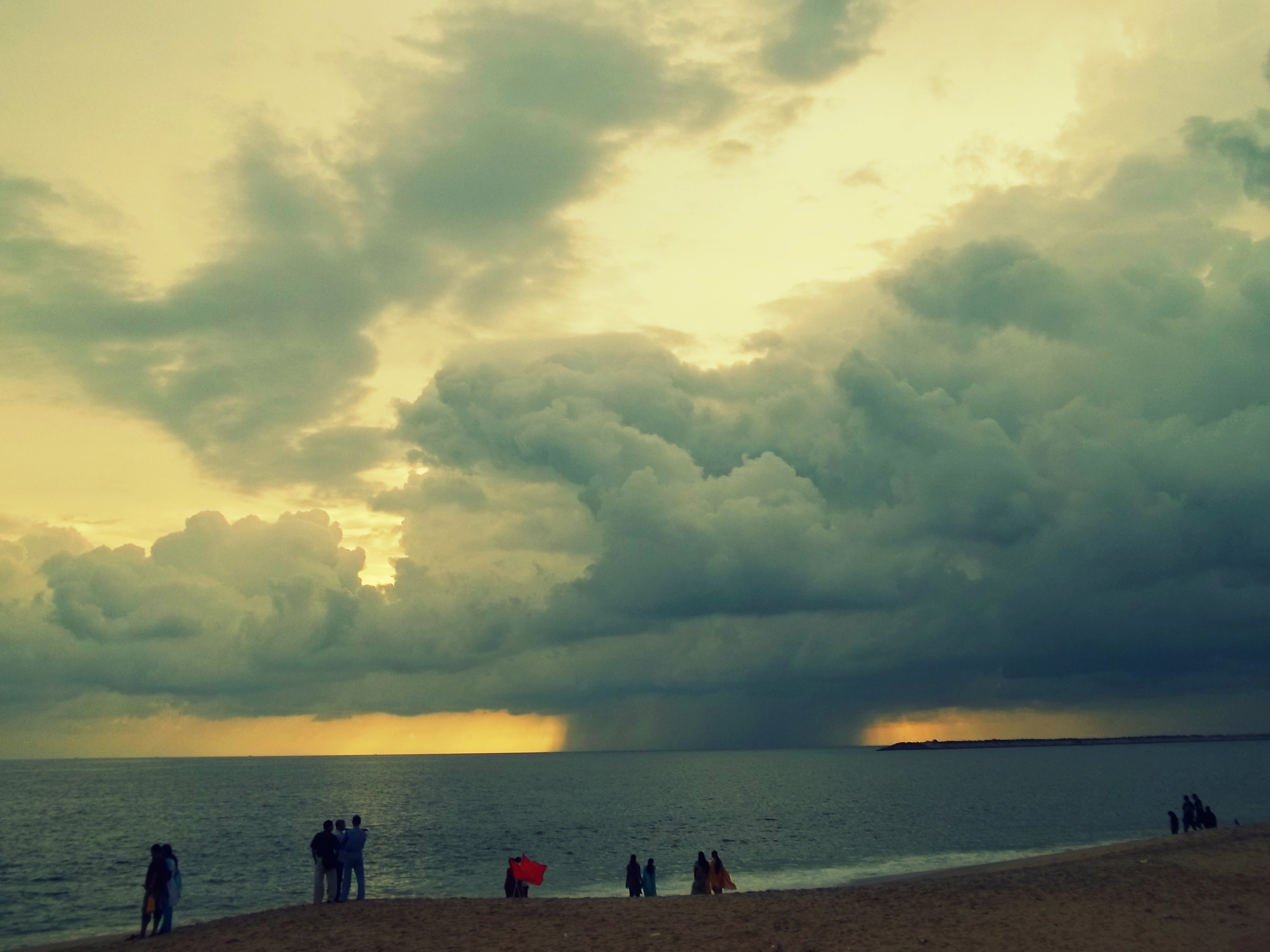
View of Arabian Sea from Kollam Beach

Kollam Beach, also known as Mahatma Gandhi Beach, is a beach at Kollam city in the Indian state of Kerala. Kollam Beach is the first 'Beach Wedding Destination' in Kerala.

The beach also features a park of international standard, the Mahatma Gandhi Park, which was inaugurated on 1 January 1961 by the then Vice President of India, Zakir Husain. Kollam beach is one among the few beaches in Kerala with a lifeguard outpost. Lifeguards were stationed at the beach from 2005. As of July 2015 Kovalam, Kollam is one among the three beaches in south Kerala with lifeguard outposts.

== Overview ==
Kollam Port is one of the oldest and most important ports for the international cashew trade on the Malabar Coast of the Arabian Sea. As of 2025, Kollam Port is the third largest port in Kerala after Trivandrum Port and Cochin Port.

Kollam was once a favourite settlement of the Portuguese, the Dutch and the English in succession before Independence.

The port is protected by the Tangasseri breakwater, extending about 1.1 miles (1.8 km) south-south east of Tangasseri Point. The exotic location and backwaters makes Kollam Beach one of Kerala's most popular tourist attractions.

=== Marine Aquarium ===
On 22 June 2014, construction work started on a marine aquarium at Kollam Beach, which was first of its kind in the state of Kerala. The Harbour Engineering Department is constructing the aquarium at the eastern side of the beach on behalf of Kollam Municipal Corporation. The foundation stone for the project was laid in March and is expected to complete by December 2014. It will be a single storey aquarium with 40 large tanks to hold a diverse collection of marine life and will be an added attraction for visitors to Kollam beach.

== Tangasseri Lighthouse ==
The 144-foot (44 m) Tangasseri lighthouse built in 1902 is a major landmark at the beach.

== Historic monuments ==
Ruins of Portuguese / Dutch forts and 18th-century churches near the port remain as a memento of the Portuguese and Dutch rule of the area.

== Gallery ==
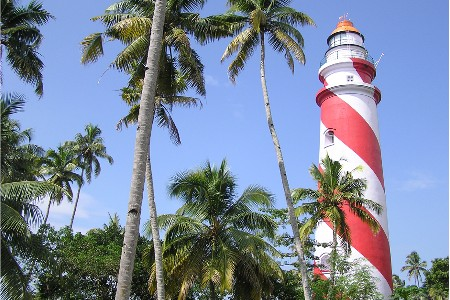
Tangasseri Lighthouse near Kollam Beach

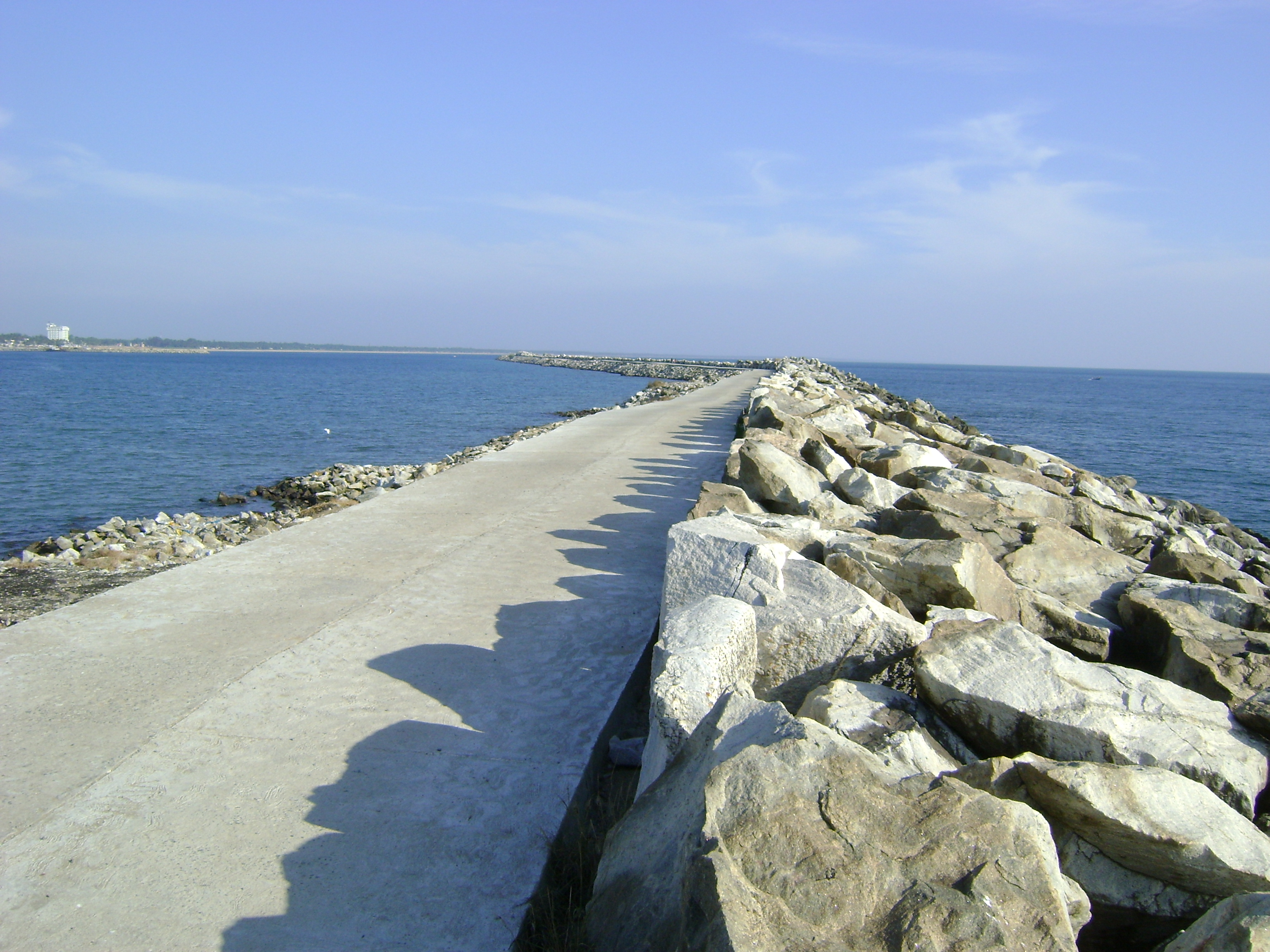
Breakwater at Tangasseri

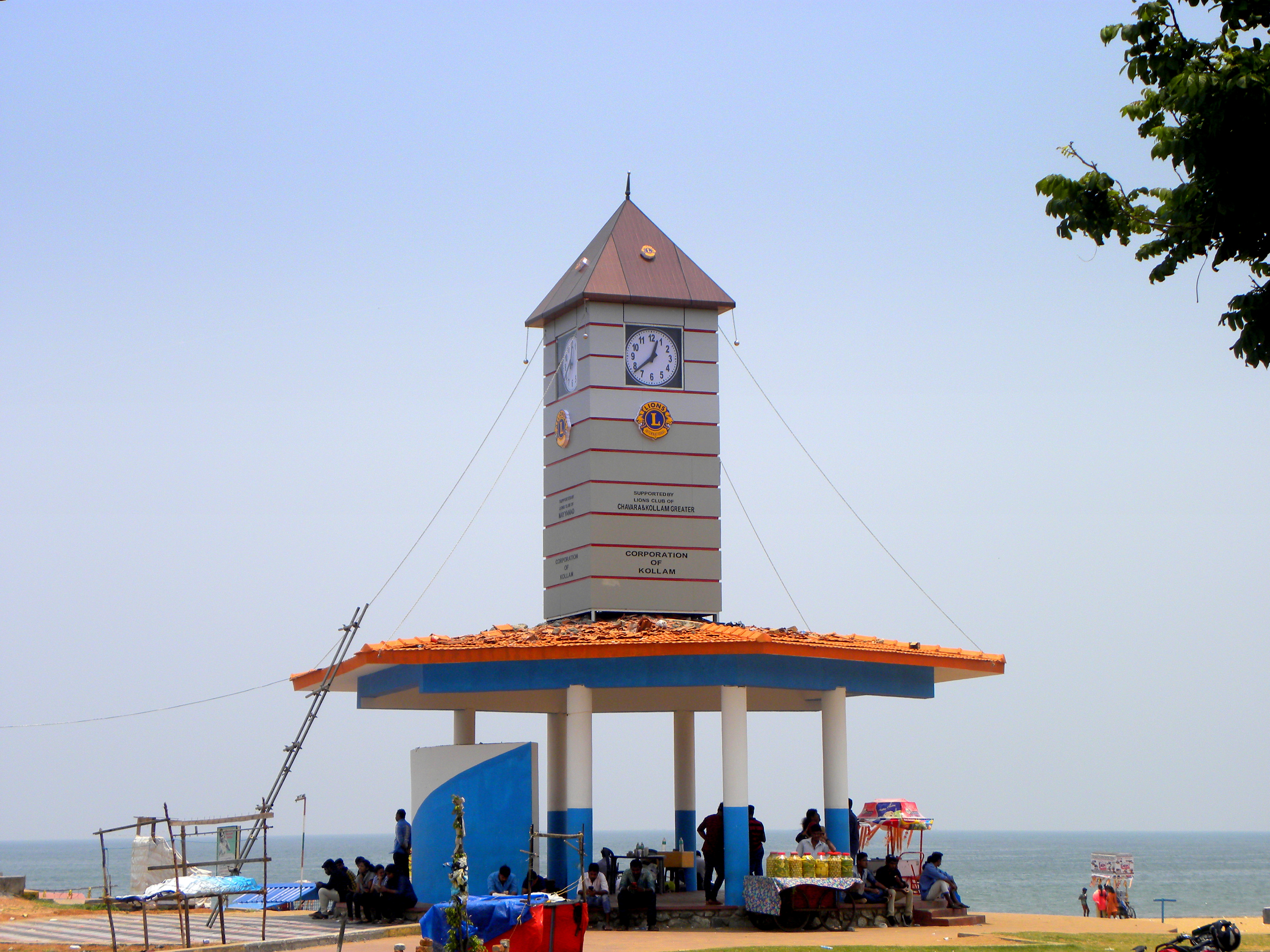
Clocktower in Kollam Beach

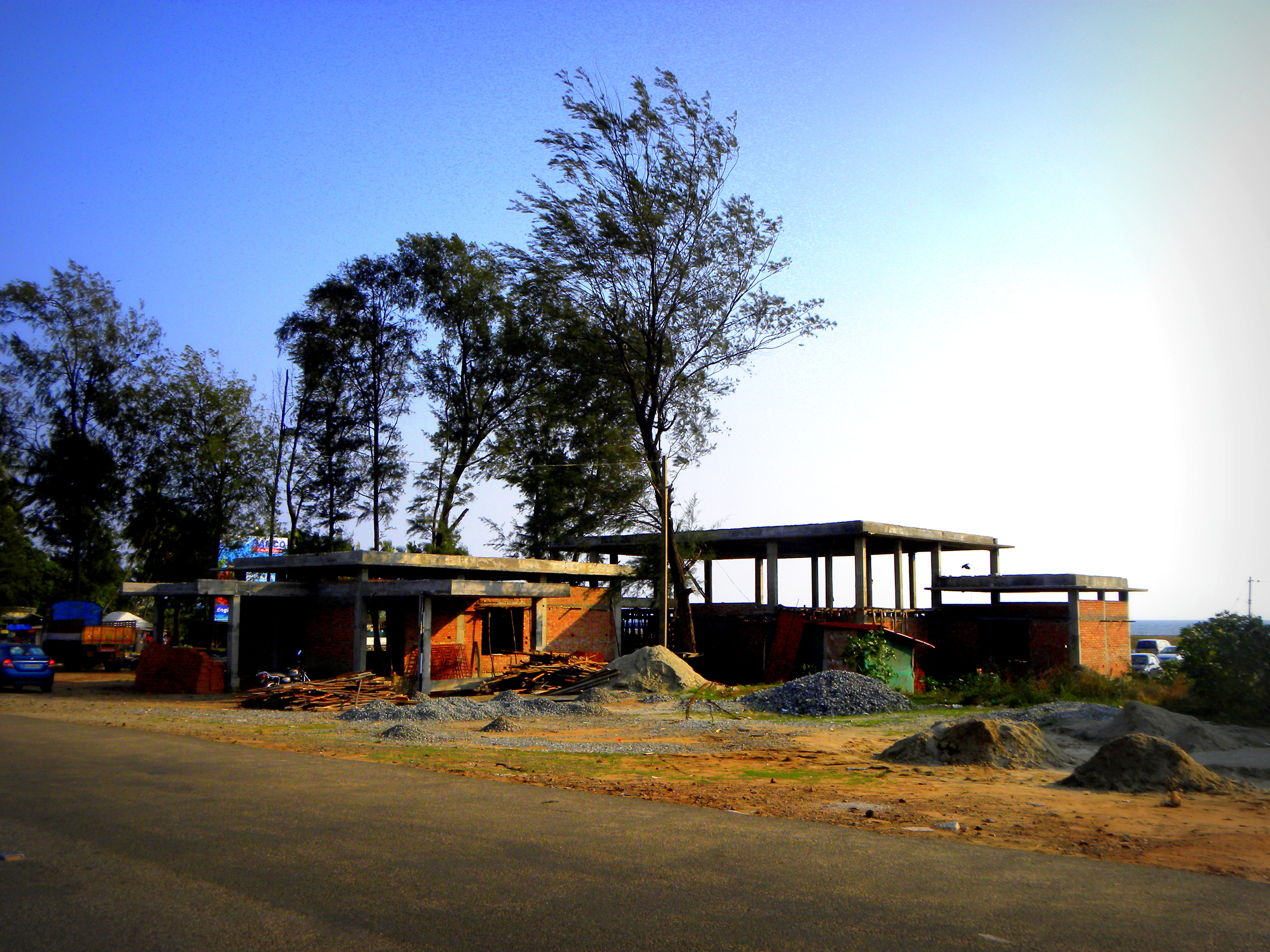
Marine Aquarium under construction at Kollam Beach

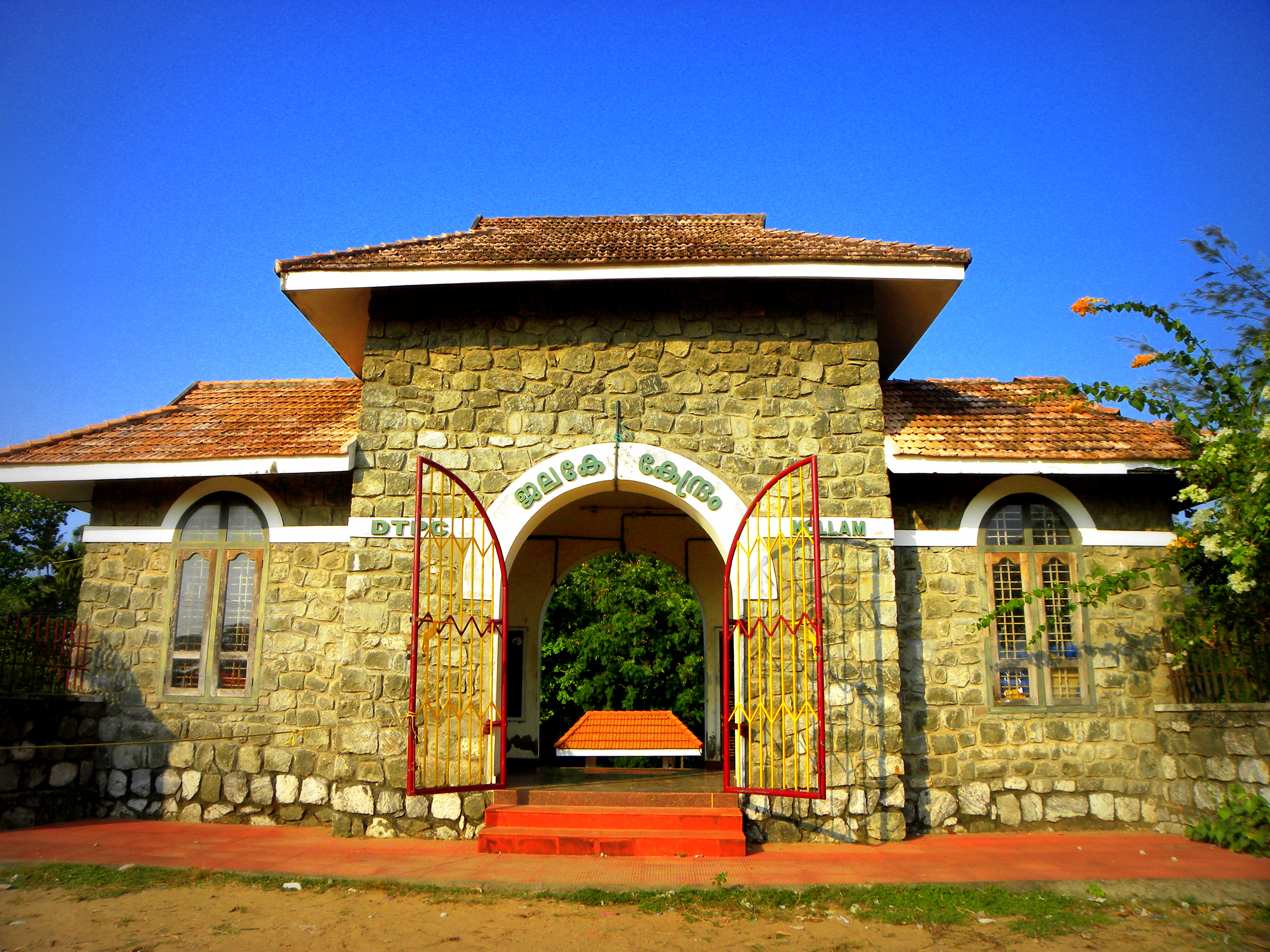
Jalakeli Kendram near the beach

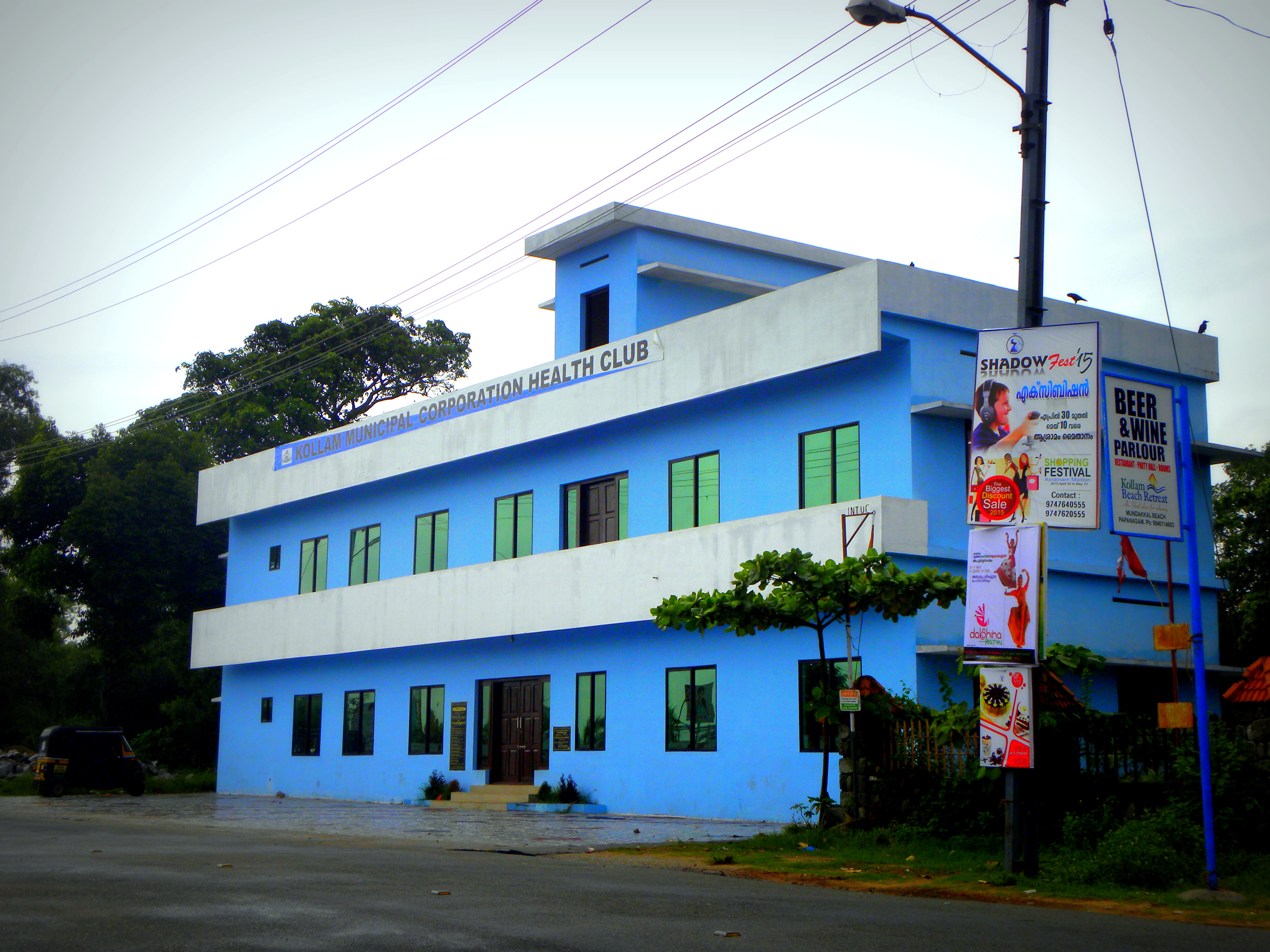
Kollam Corporation Health Club near Kollam Beach

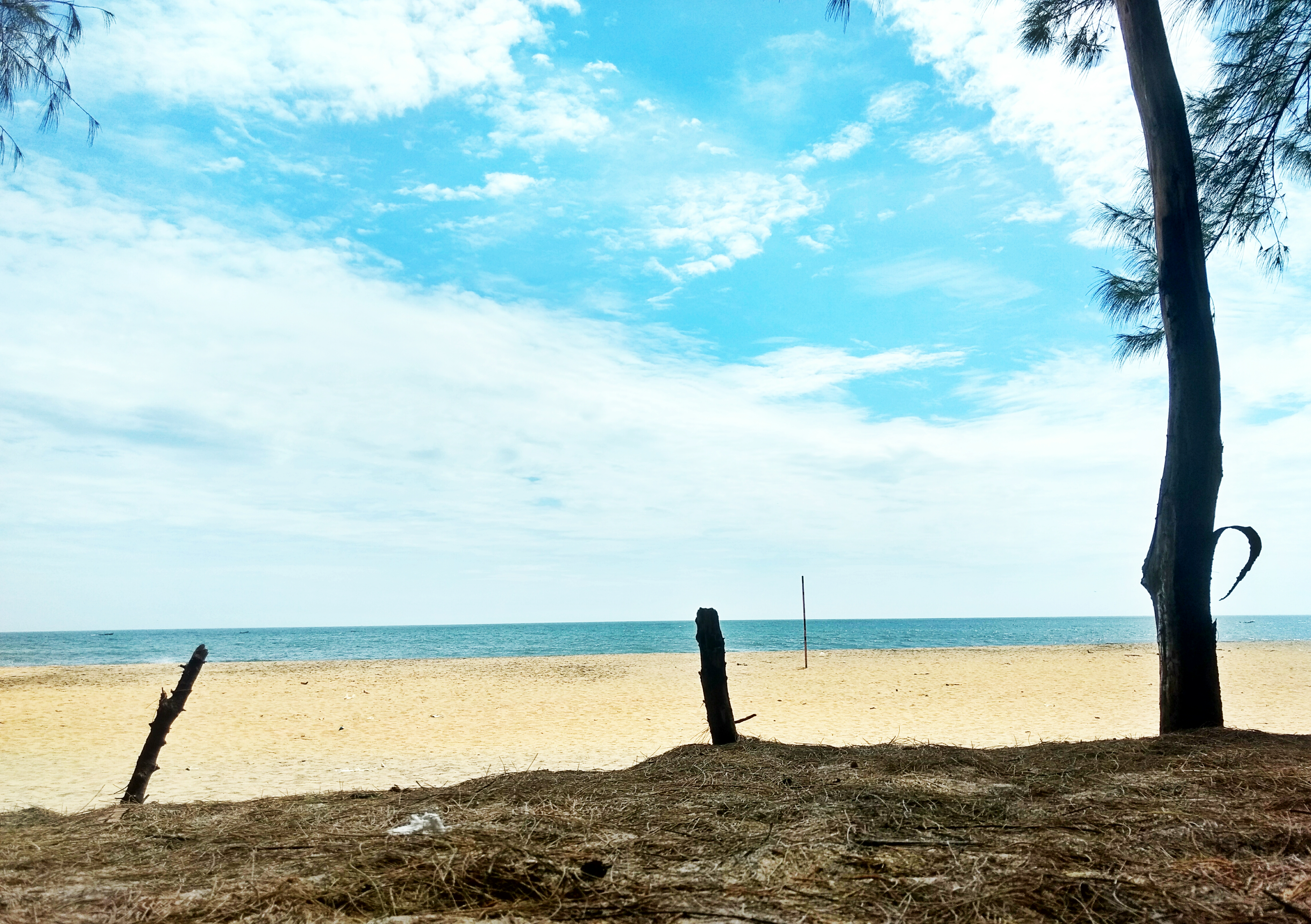
Kollam beach sky view

== Events in Kollam ==
- President's Trophy Boat Race
- Kollam pooram

== Other renowned beaches in Kerala ==
- Kovalam
- Paravur Thekkumbhagam
- Varkala
