= Tourism in Northeast India =

Northeast India
- States and big cities in Northeast India
- Population Census Estimate (2022): 51,670,000
- Area: 262,230 km^{2} (101,250 sq mi)
- Time zone: IST (UTC+5:30)

Northeast India consists of eight states: Arunachal Pradesh, Assam, Manipur, Meghalaya, Mizoram, Nagaland, Sikkim and Tripura. Tourism in this area is based around the unique Himalayan landscape and culture distinct from the rest of India.

== Tourist circuits ==
- Arunachal Pradesh: the Bhalukpong-Bomdila-Tawang Tourist Circuit along the Arunachal Frontier Highway and the Nafra-Seppa-Pappu-Pasa-Pakke Valleys-Sangdupota-New Sagalee-Ziro-Yomcha Tourist Circuit along the Trans-Arunachal Highway and East-West Industrial Corridor Highway have been developed under the Swadesh Darshan Scheme.

== National parks ==
- Namdapha National Park is the largest protected area in the Eastern Himalaya biodiversity hotspot and is in Arunachal Pradesh in Northeast India. It is the third largest national park in India in area. It is in the Eastern Himalayan sub-region and is recognized as one of the richest areas in biodiversity in India.
- Keibul Lamjao National Park is the world's only floating national park in the periphery of the Loktak Lake, the largest lake in the entire North East India. It is the only natural habitat of the dancing deer, Sangai (Cervus eldi eldi), once thought to be extinct. Sangai festival is a grand international festival Origanised by the Government of Manipur for the preservation of the deer.
- Sirohi National Park is a National park in the Hill top of the Shirui Hill in Ukhrul district of Manipur. It is the only habitat of the beautiful terrestrial lily, Shirui lily (Lilium macklineae), which is found nowhere in the world except in this park.
- Kaziranga National Park is a national park in the Golaghat and Nagaon districts of the state of Assam, India. A World Heritage Site, the park hosts two-thirds of the world's great one-horned rhinoceroses. Kaziranga boasts the highest density of tigers among protected areas in the world and was declared a tiger reserve in 2006.
- Orang National Park is on the north bank of the Brahmaputra River in the Darrang and Sonitpur districts of Assam. The park has a rich flora and fauna, including great Indian one-horned rhinoceros, pigmy hog, elephants, wild buffalo and tigers. It is the only stronghold of rhinoceros on the north bank of the Brahmaputra.
- Manas National Park or Manas Wildlife Sanctuary is a national park, UNESCO Natural World Heritage Site, a Project Tiger reserve, an elephant reserve and a biosphere reserve in Assam.
- Dibru-Saikhowa National Park is a national wildlife park in Tinsukia, Assam. It mainly consists of moist mixed semi-evergreen forests, moist mixed deciduous forests, canebrakes and grasslands. It is the largest salix swamp forest in northeast India.
- Nameri National Park is in the foothills of the Eastern Himalayas in the Sonitpur District of Assam. This is excellent elephant country and was considered to be an elephant reserve. It is an ideal habitat for a host of other animals including the tiger, leopard, sambar, dhole (the Asiatic wild dog), pygmy hog, muntjac, gaur, wild boar, sloth bear, Himalayan black bear, capped langur and Indian giant squirrel.
- Balphakram National Park is a national park about 3,000 metres above sea level, near the Garo Hills in Meghalaya, India. It is often referred to as the "abode of perpetual winds" as well as the "land of spirits." It is the home of the barking deer and the golden cat.
- Nokrek National Park, or Nokrek Biosphere Reserve, is a national park approximately 2 km from Tura Peak in West Garo Hills district of Meghalaya, India. UNESCO added this National park to its list of Biosphere Reserves in May 2009. Along with Balpakram, Nokrek is a hotspot of biodiversity in Meghalaya.

Other national parks

- Mouling National Park is in the Indian state of Arunachal Pradesh.
- Keibul Lamjao National Park is in the Bishnupur district of the state of Manipur.
- Sirohi National Park is located in the state of Manipur.
- Murlen National Park is in the Champhai district Mizoram.
- Ntangki National Park is in Peren district of Nagaland.
- Phawngpui is the Blue Mountain of Mizoram, a highly revered peak, considered to be the abode of the gods. Phawngpui peak is the highest mountain peak in Mizoram.
- Pobitora Wildlife Sanctuary is a wildlife reserve in the Marigaon district of the state of Assam.
- Sipahijola Wildlife Sanctuary is a wildlife sanctuary in Tripura.
- Gorumara National Park is a National Park in northern West Bengal.
- Singalila National Park is located on the Singalila Ridge at an altitude of more than 7000 feet above sea level, in the Darjeeling district of West Bengal.
- Neora Valley National Park is in the Kalimpong subdivision under Darjeeling District, West Bengal.
- Jaldapara National Park is at the foothills of the Eastern Himalayas in Alipurduar district in West Bengal and on the bank of the Torsa River.
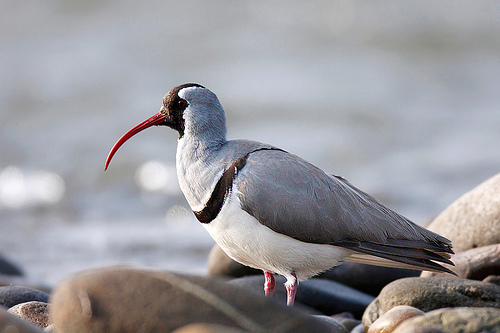
Ibisbill in Nameri National Park

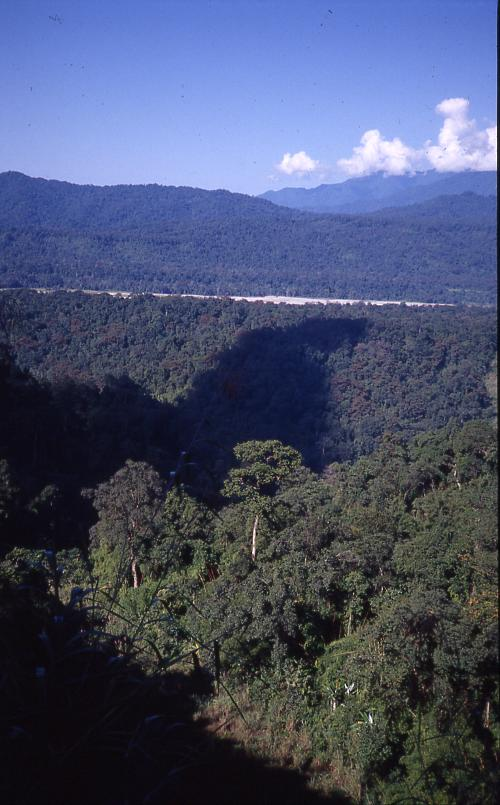
Canopy cover of Namdapha National Park

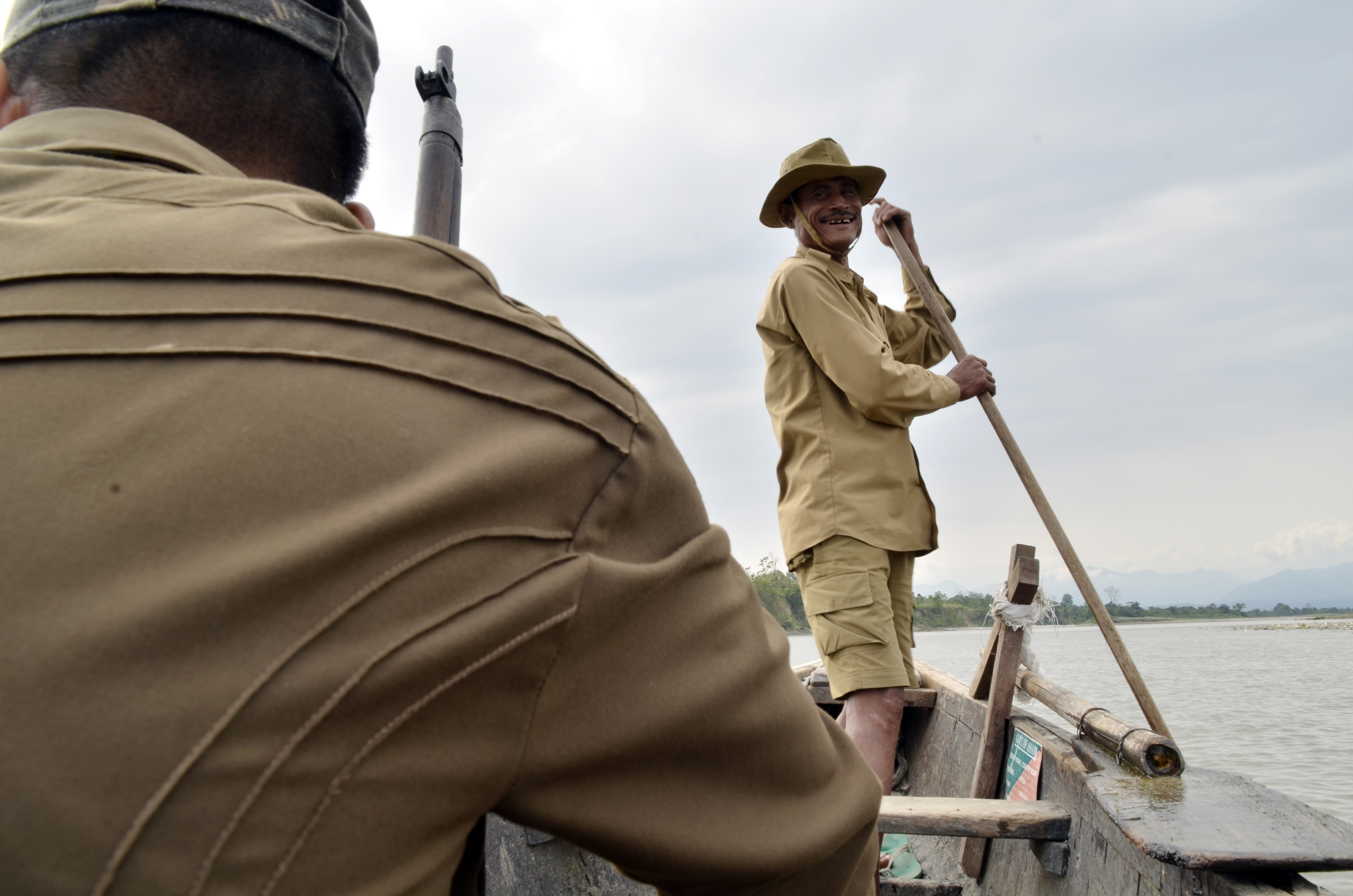
River patrolling by forest guards at Nameri National Park

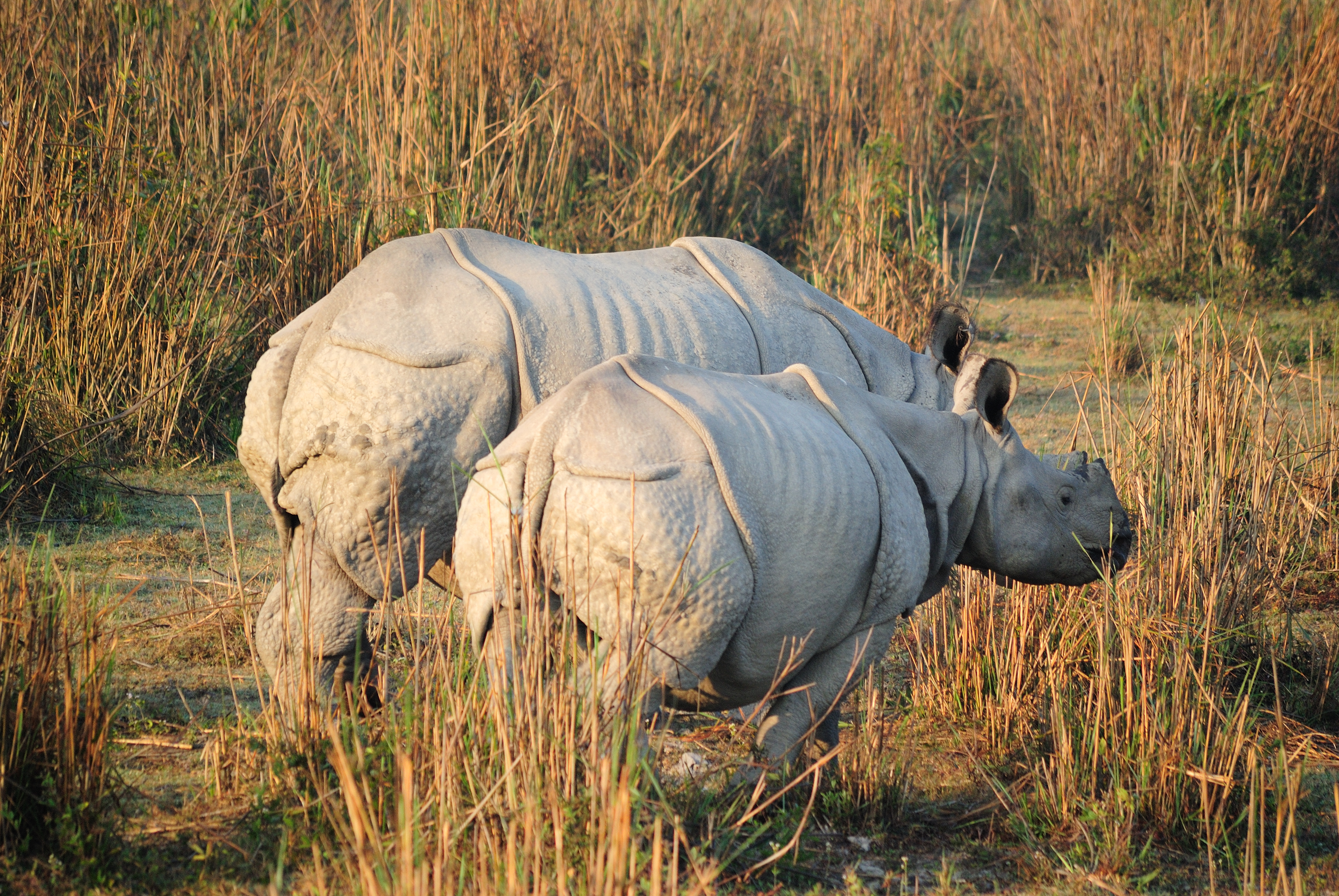
Kaziranga is an important habitat for the Indian rhinoceros

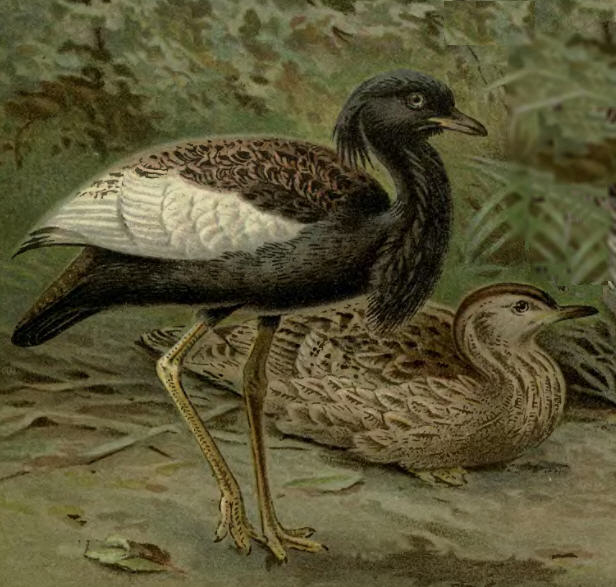
Bengal florican, a threatened species conserved in the Orang National Park

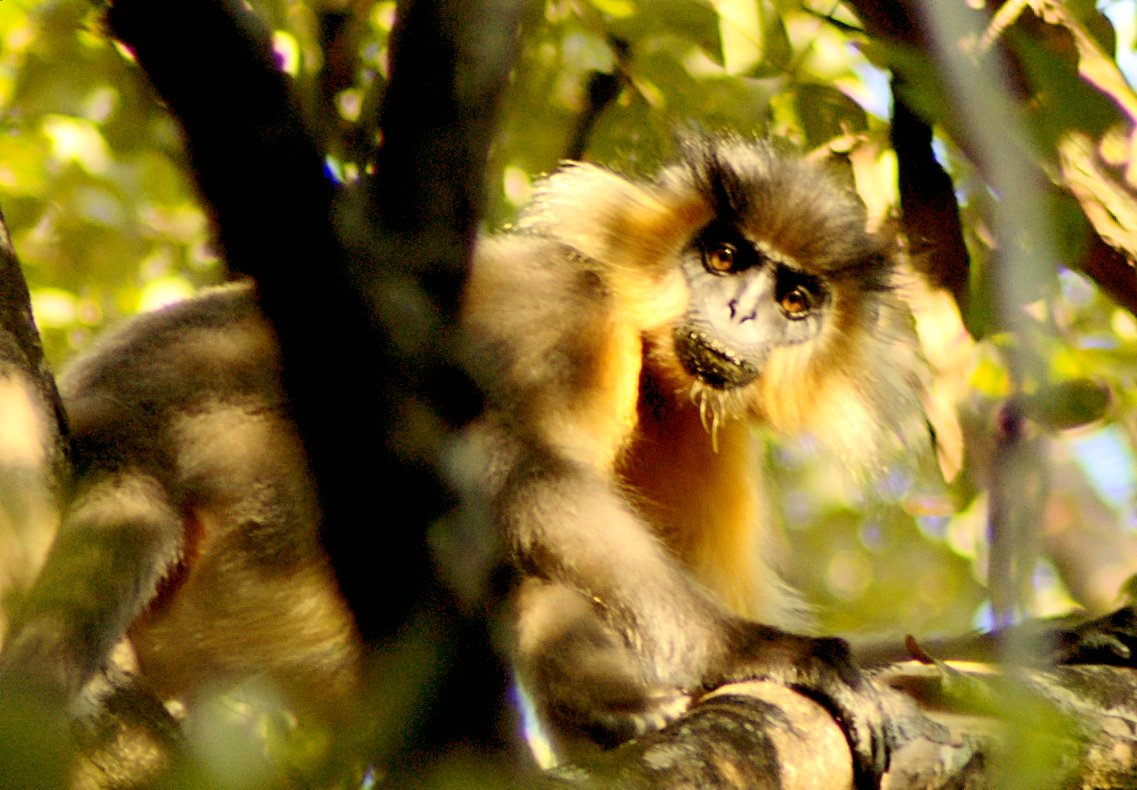
A capped langur in Manas National Park

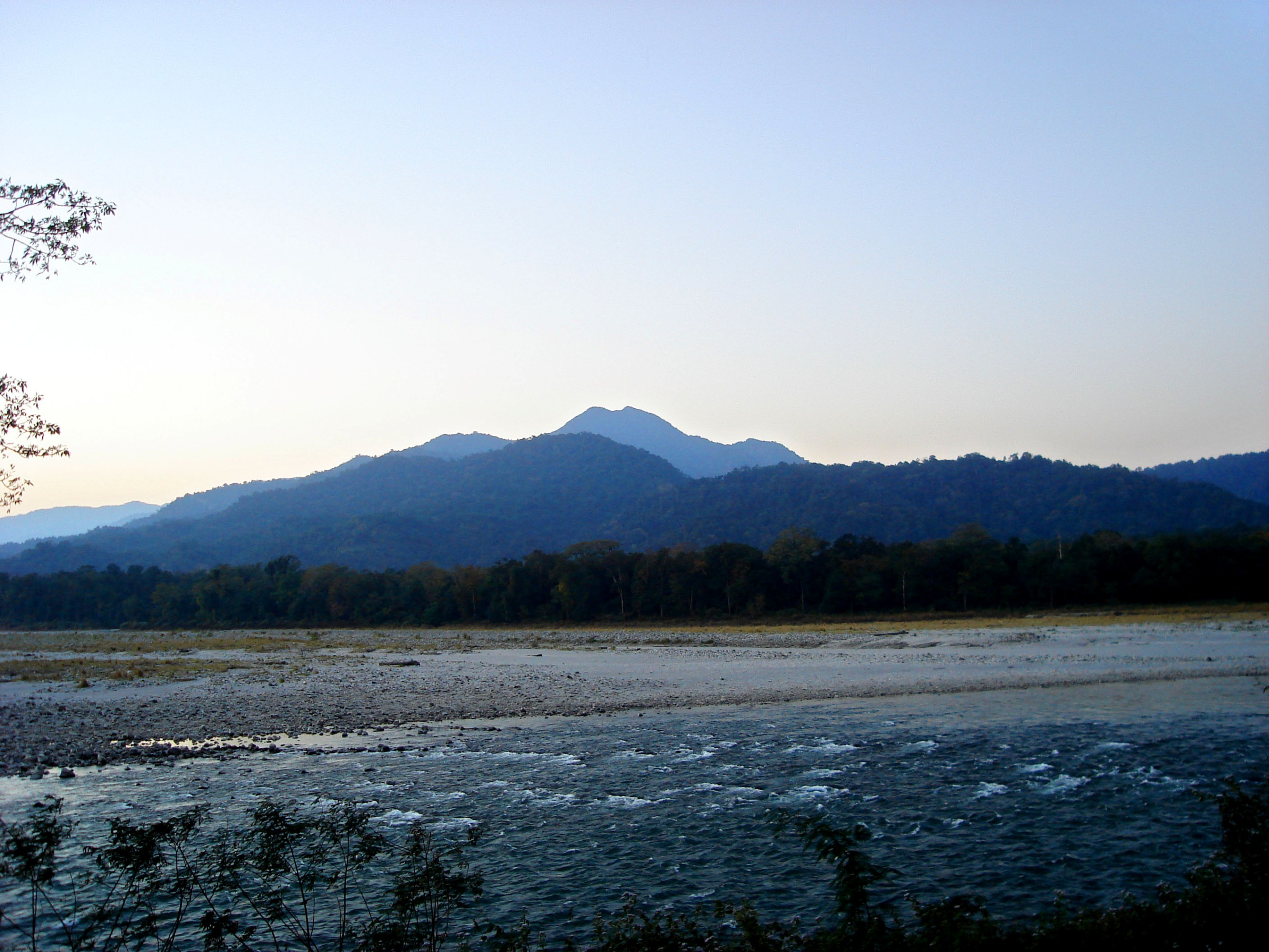
A view of mountains from the Manas.

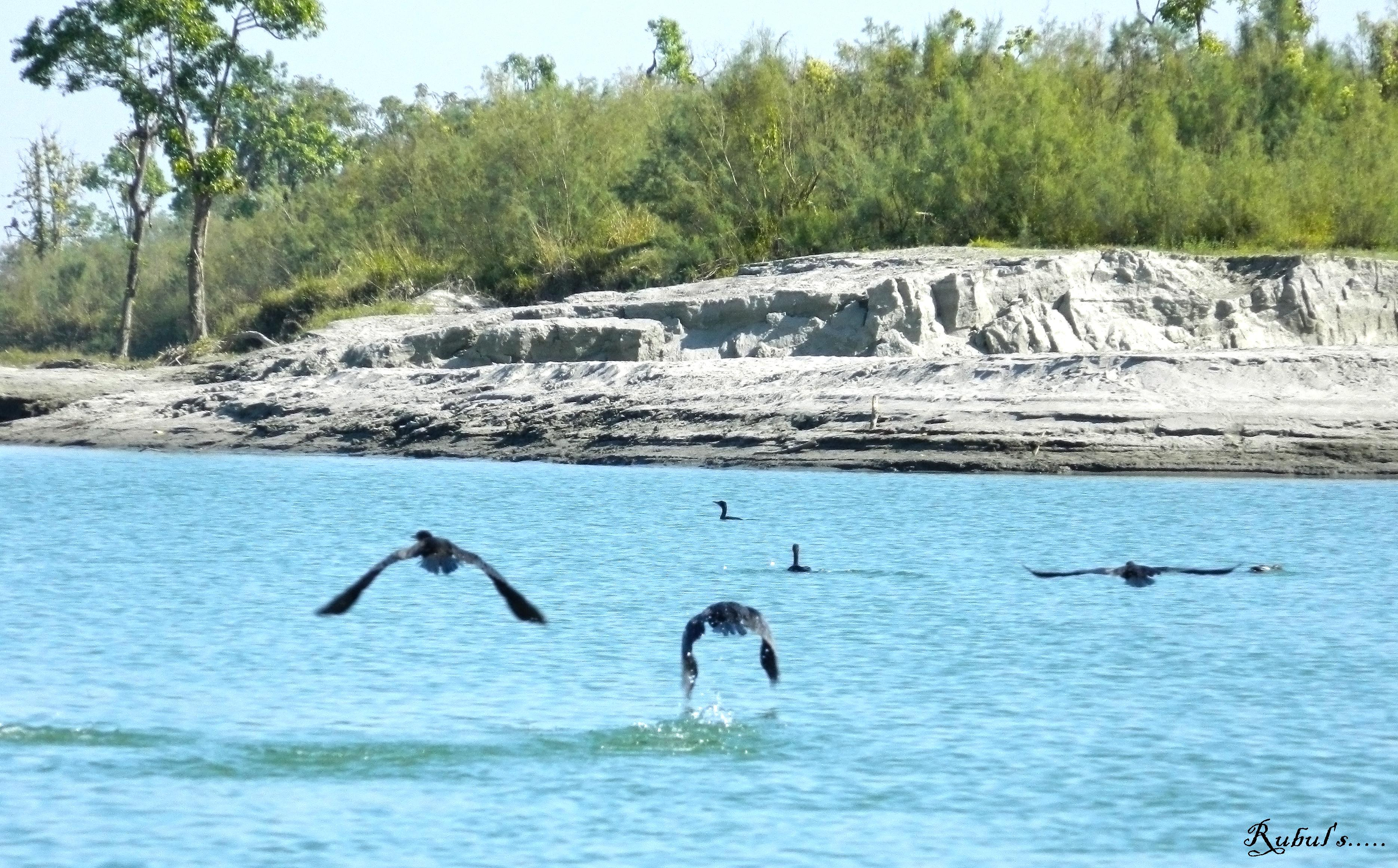
A view from Dibru-Saikhowa National Park

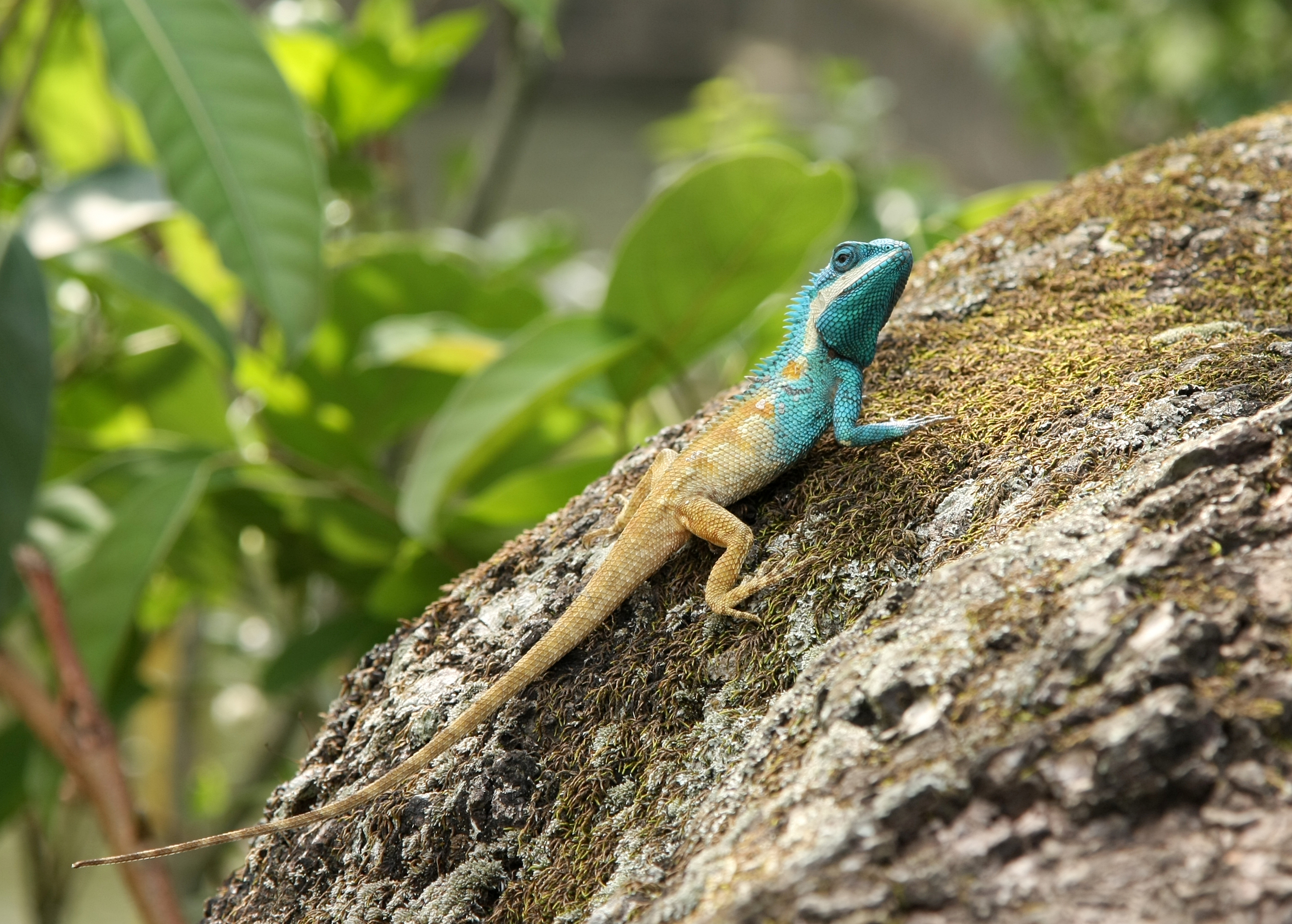
A blue-crested lizard (Calotes mystaceus) in Keibul Lamjao National Park.

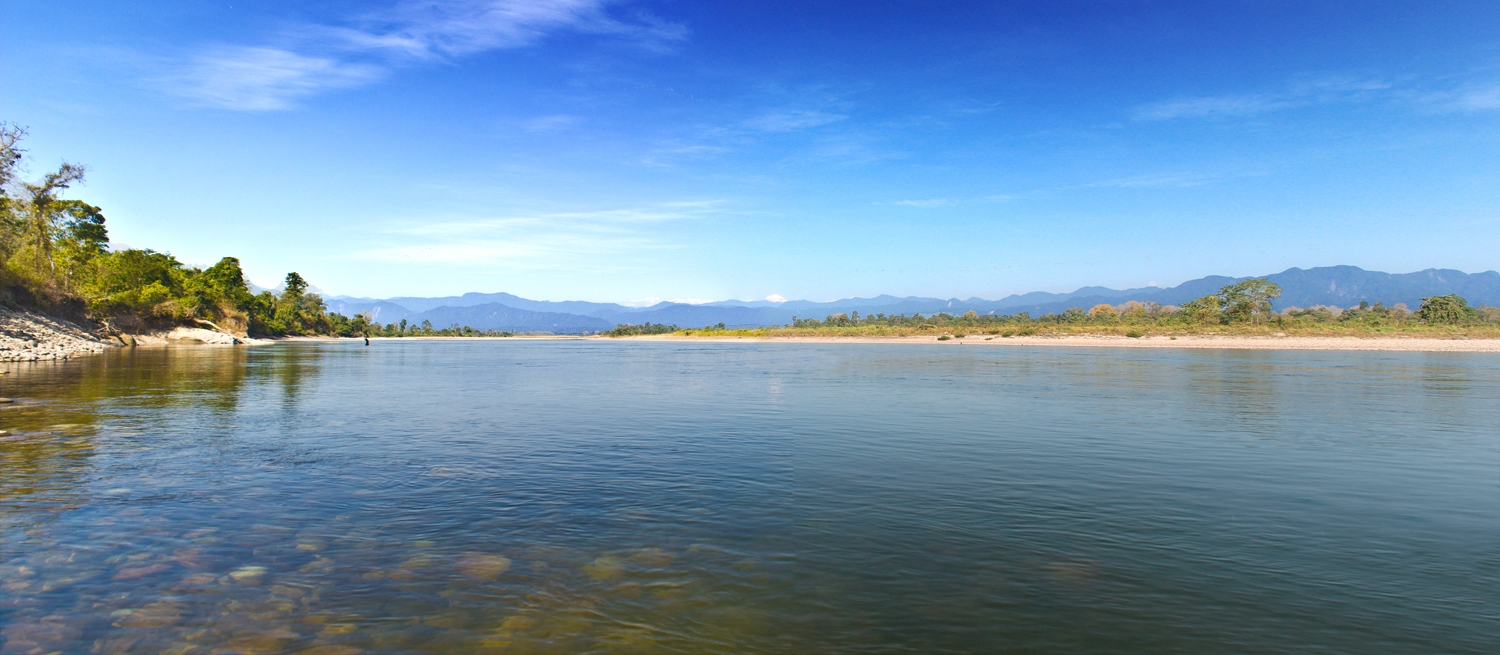
Nameri National Park

== Reserved forest ==
- Nongmaiching Reserved Forest in the Nongmaiching Ching mountains in the Imphal Valley of Manipur
- Kakoijana reserved forest – Kakoijana reserved forest is famous for Golden Langurs.
- Langol Reserved Forest – It is known as the "lungs of Imphal Valley" for its wide stretching area span in the Imphal valley. Besides, it is famous for the sacred groves which were preserved since ancient times for religious belief. Langol Lairembi Temple and Langol Ningthou Temple are great religious destinations for people of Sanamahi Faith in North East India.
- Bhairabkunda Reserve Forest (Assam)

== Hills ==
- Kangchenjunga – Kangchenjunga is the third highest mountain in the world. It rises with an elevation of 8,586 m (28,169 ft) in a section of the Himalayas called Kangchenjunga Himal that is limited in the west by the Tamur River and in the east by the Teesta River. The Kangchenjunga Himal is located in eastern Nepal and Sikkim, India.
- Mount Tempü, aka Mount Iso, is the highest peak in Manipur. One can experience the sight of the abode of angels, the great Dzüko Valley from the top of the peak.
- Mt. Koubru – Mt. Koubru, one of the highest peak in North East India is situated in Manipur. It is easily identified by its humped back like a cow. It is the greatest religious destination for people of Sanamahi faith as well as adventure place for people across the nation.
- Naga Hills – The Naga Hills, reaching a height of around 3,825 metres (12,549 feet), lie on the border of India and Burma (Myanmar).
- Patkai Hills – The Patkai hills are on India's northeastern border with Burma.
- Khasi Hills – The Khasi Hills are part of the Garo-Khasi range in the Indian state of Meghalaya, and is part of the Patkai range and of the Meghalaya subtropical forests ecoregion.
- Lushai Hills – The Lushai Hills (or Mizo Hills) are part of the Patkai range in Mizoram and partially in Tripura, India. Hills in Mizoram run north–south. A hill range of the Mizo Poets Square also known as Mizo Hlakungpui Mual runs from north to south. The Poets Square was set up in 1986 to commemorate the Mizo poets and writers at the outskirts of Khawbung. It is one of the most visited sites for tourists.
- Assam Himalaya – Assam Himalaya is a traditional designation for the portion of the Himalaya range between the eastern border of Bhutan, on the west, and the Great Bend of the Tsangpo River, on the east.
- Garo Hills – The Garo Hills are part of the Garo-Khasi range in Meghalaya, India. They are inhabited mainly by tribal dwellers, the majority of whom are Garo people. It is one of the wettest places in the world.
- Sela Pass – Sela Pass is the high-altitude mountain pass in Tawang District of Arunachal Pradesh state of India. It has an elevation of 4,170 m (13,680 ft). It connects the Buddhist city of Tawang Town to Tezpur and Guwahati and is the main road connecting Tawang with the rest of India.

Other hills

- Jongsong Peak is a mountain in the 'Janak' section of the Himalayas. At 7,462 metres (24,482 ft) it is the 57th highest peak in the world, although it is dominated by the third highest, Kangchenjunga, 20 km (12 mi) to the south. Jongsong's summit is at a three-way boundary between Nepal, China and India.
- Gimmigela Chuli, or The Twins, is a mountain in the Himalayas, on the border between Taplejung, Mechi, Nepal and Sikkim, India. It has an elevation of 7,350 m (24,110 ft) above sea level.
- Kabru is a mountain in the Himalayas on the border of eastern Nepal and India. It is part of a ridge that extends south from Kangchenjunga and is the southernmost 7,000 metres (23,000 ft) peak in the world.
- Kirat Chuli or Tent Peak is a mountain in the Himalayas. It lies on the border between Nepal and India.
- Mount Pandim is a Himalayan mountain in Sikkim, India. It has an elevation of 6,691 m (21,952 ft) above sea level.
- Paohanli Peak or Paunhuri is a 7,128-metre-high (23,386 ft) peak at the border of Zarkang, Yadong County, Tibet (China) and Sikkim (India).
- Pauhunri is a mountain in the Eastern Himalayas. It is on the border of Sikkim, India and Tibet, China, and is about 75 km northeast of Kangchenjunga.
- Siniolchu is one of the tallest mountains of the Indian state of Sikkim. The 6,888 metres (22,598 ft) mountain is considered to be particularly aesthetically attractive, having been described by Douglas Freshfield as "the most superb triumph of mountain architecture and the most beautiful snow mountain in the world".
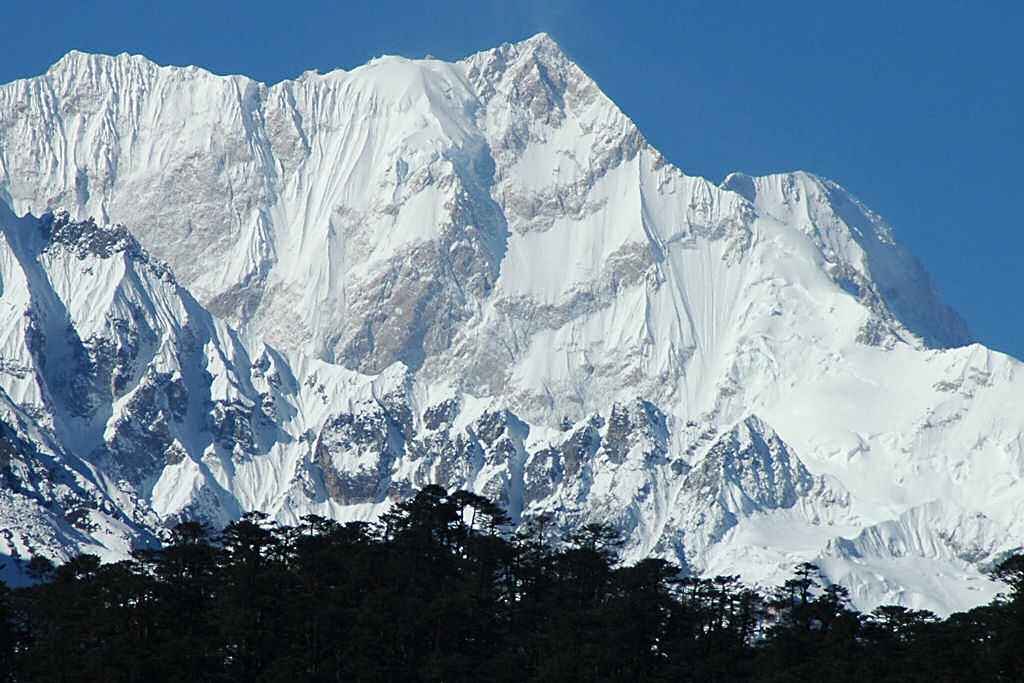
East face of Kangchenjunga, from near the Zemu Glacier.

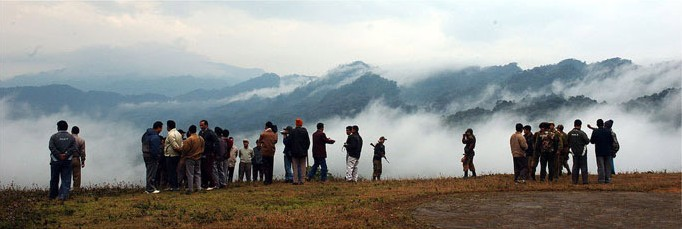
Patkai hills as seen from Pangsau Pass

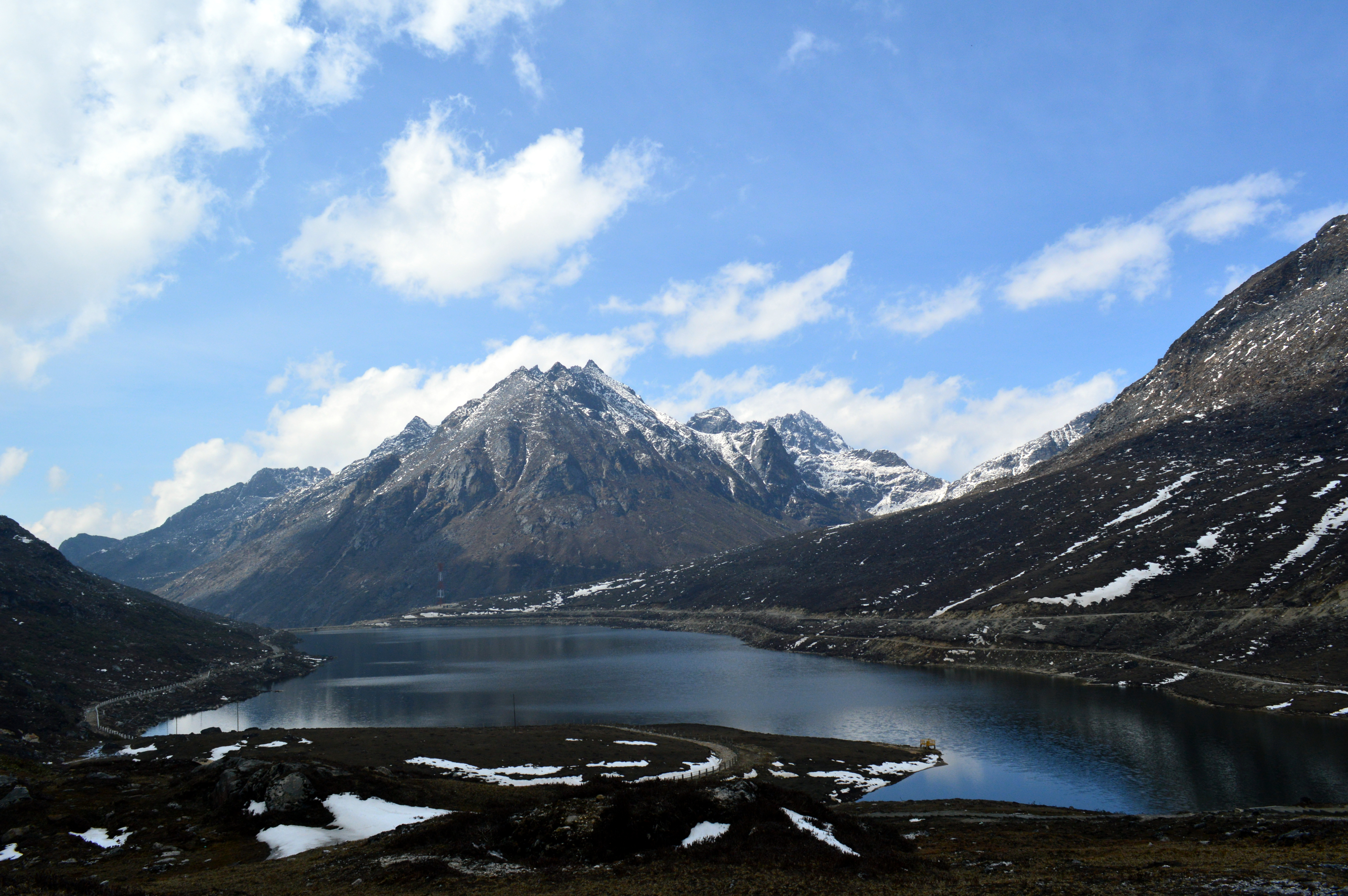
Sela Pass, Arunachal Pradesh, India.

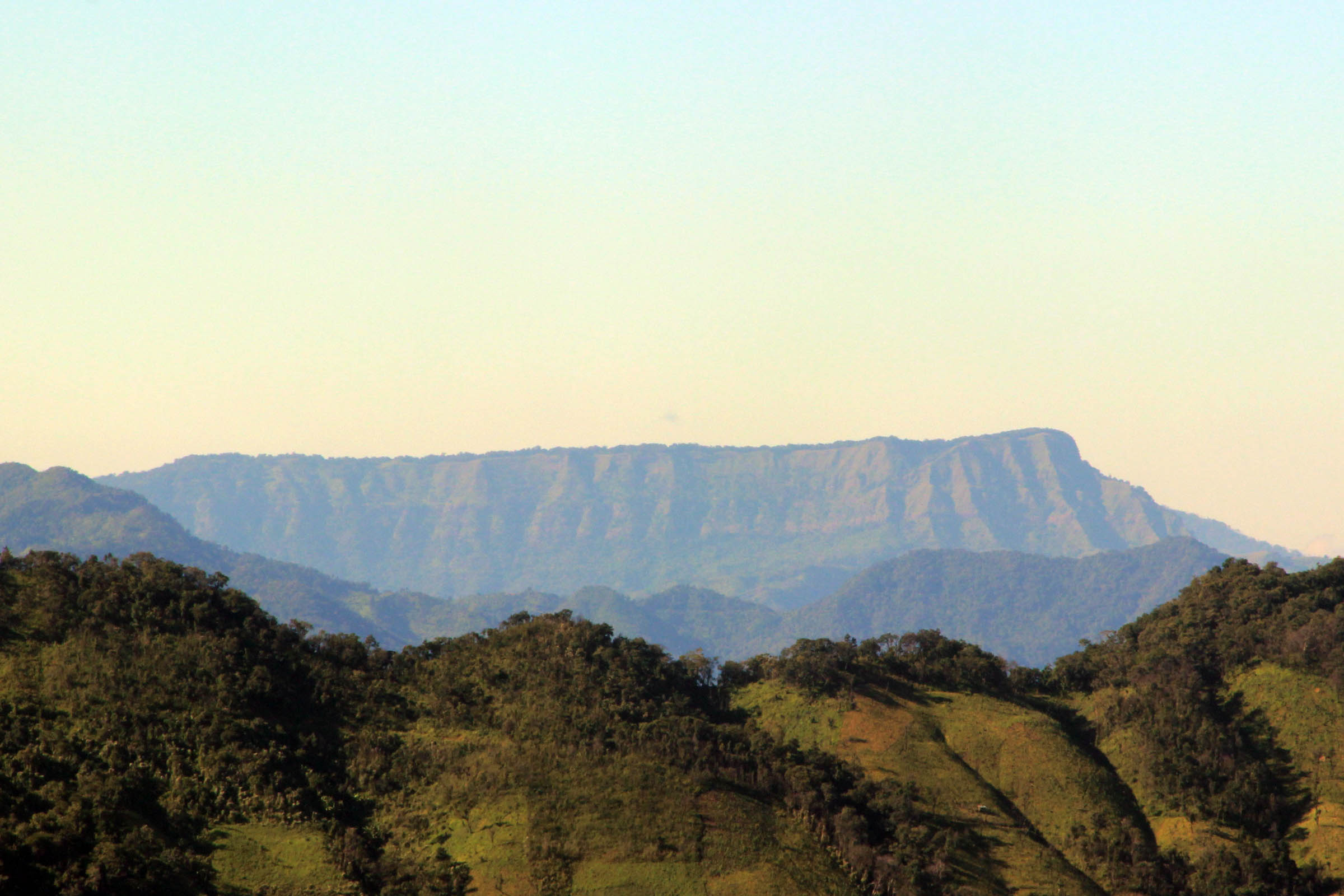
Tawi Tlang hill range in the central Mizoram is known for adventure sports.

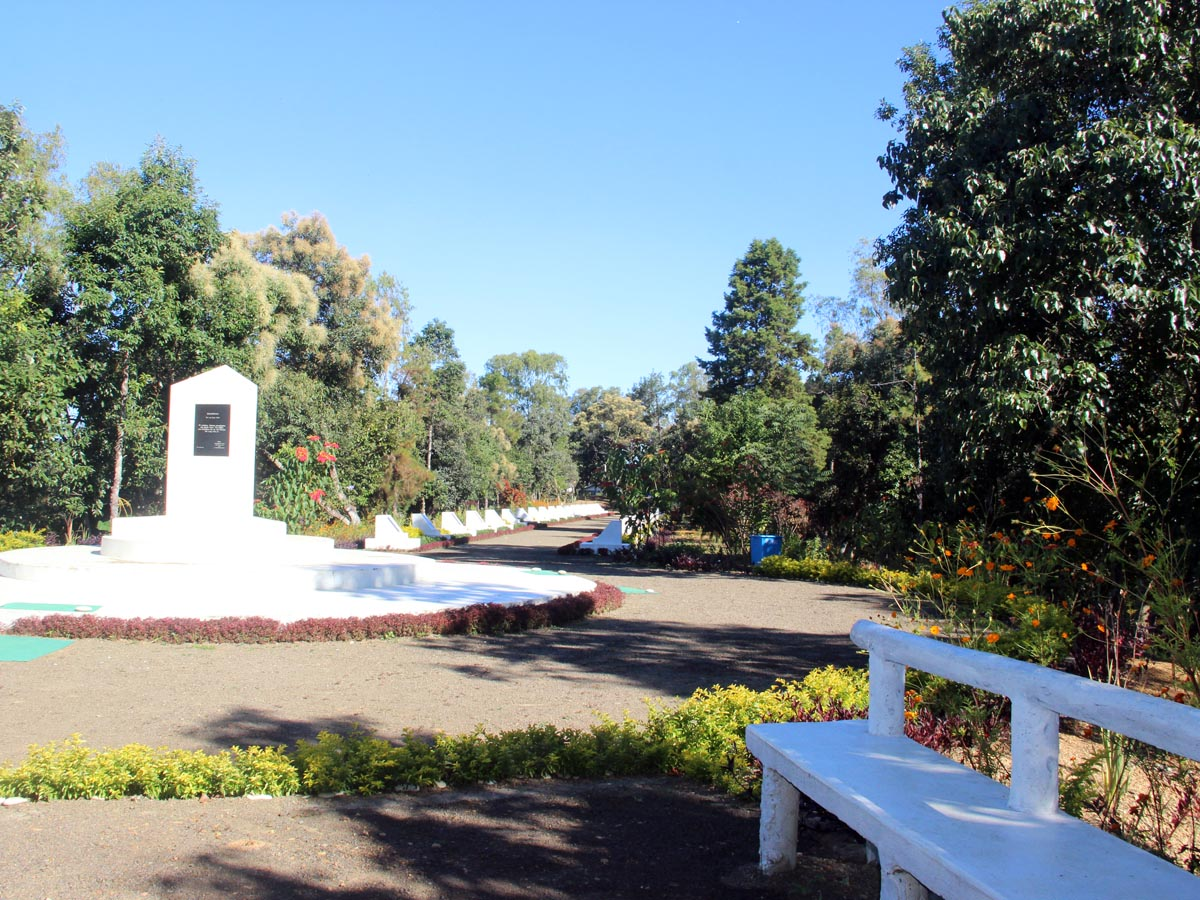
Mizo Poets Square also known as Mizo Hlakungpui Mual.

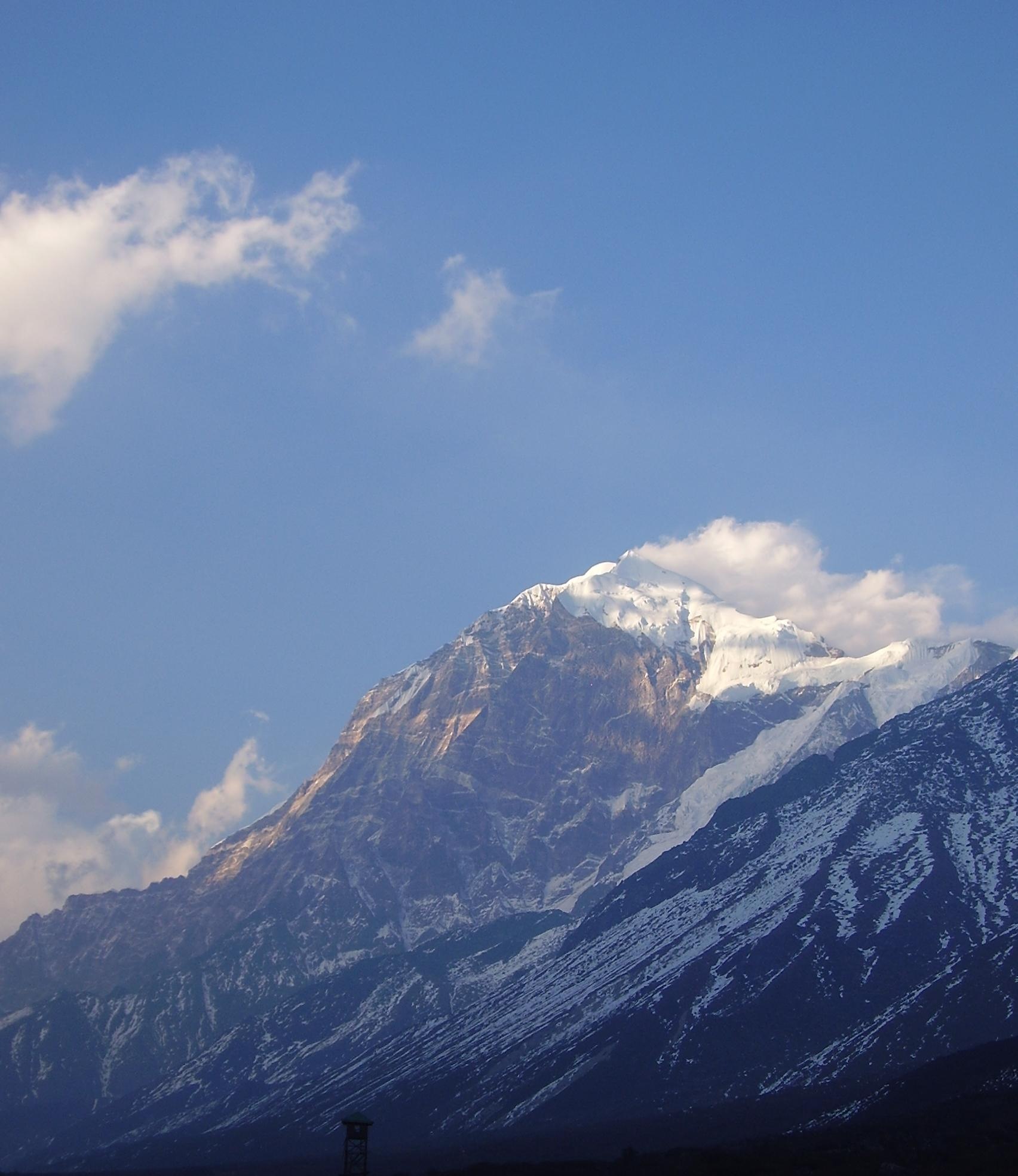
West face of Mount Pandim, viewed from Prek Chu valley

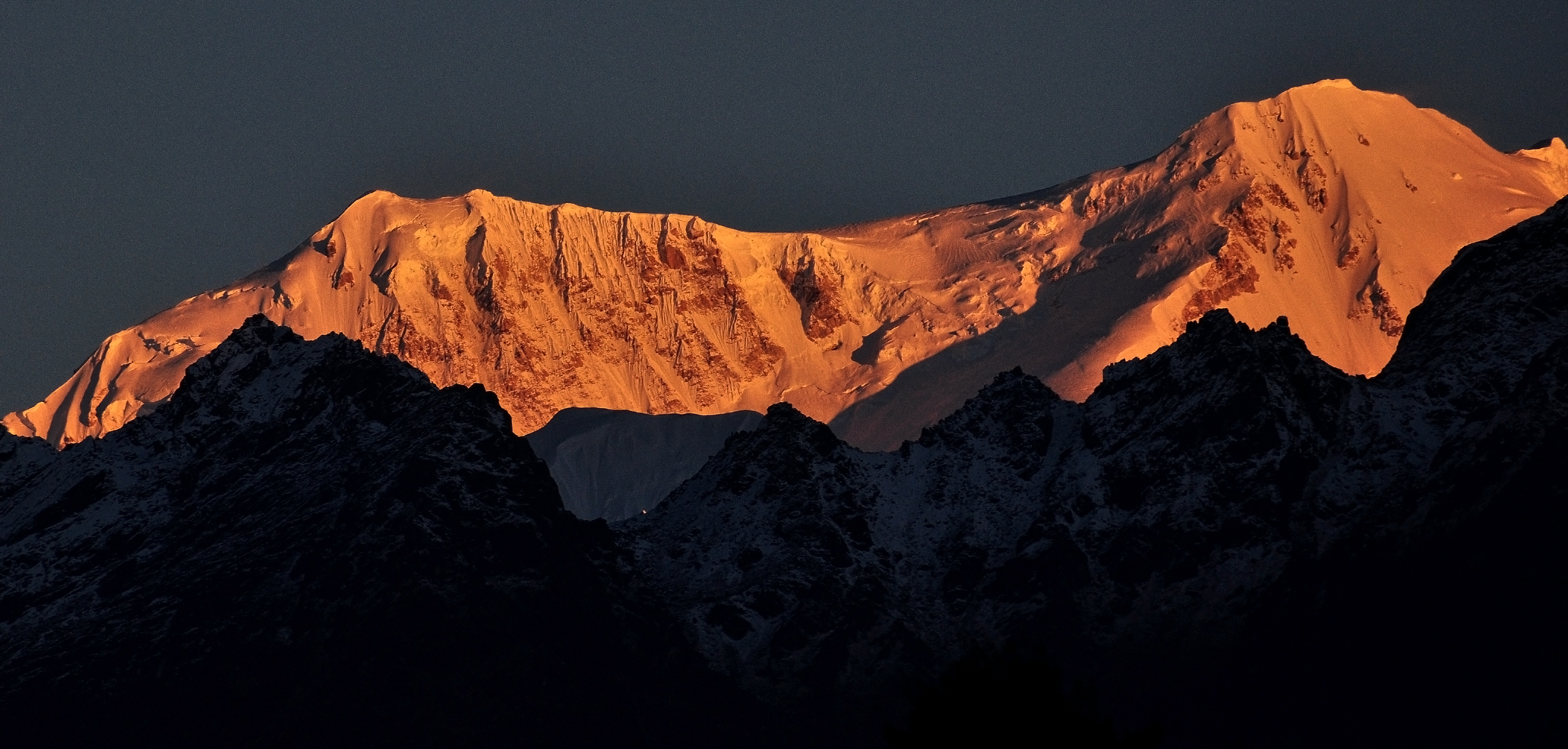
Mt. Kabru at sunrise, Sikkim (2013)

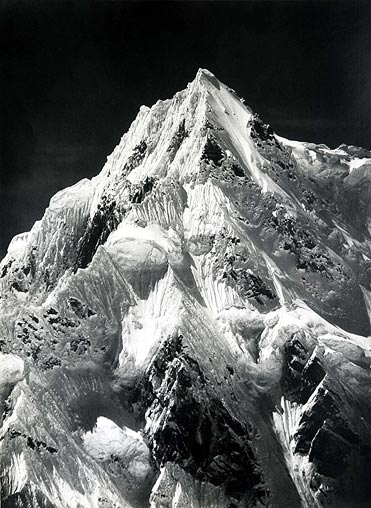
Siniolchu taken from the Zemu Glacier by Vittorio Sella

Jumpui hills (Tripura) Jampui Hills is a hill range located in the North Tripura district in the north eastern part of the Indian state of Tripura. The average altitude of the hill range is approximately 1000 metres above sea level.

== Hill stations ==
- Ukhrul – Ukhrul is a hill station in Ukhrul district, Manipur. It is a place of paradise where one will experience the real sight of blue Mountains, lovely Brooks and enchanting waterfalls. People are also friendly enough that one can seek hospitality at any household, besides the presence of several hotels and homestays.
- Tamenglong – Tamenglong is a Hill station in Tamenglong district of Manipur. It is famous for the scenic natural beauty as well as for fruit groves.
- Haflong – Haflong is a hill station in Assam, surrounded by streams, green hills and waterfalls.
- Tawang – Tawang town is a town at an elevation of approximately 3,048 metres (10,000 ft) in the northwestern part of Arunachal Pradesh of India.
- Cherrapunji – Cherrapunji is a subdivisional town in the East Khasi Hills district in the Indian state of Meghalaya. It is credited as being the wettest place on Earth, although nearby Mawsynram currently holds that record. Cherrapunji holds the all-time record for the most rainfall in a calendar month and in a year: It received 9,300 mm (370 in) in July 1861 and 26,461 mm (1,041.8 in) between 1 August 1860 and 31 July 1861.
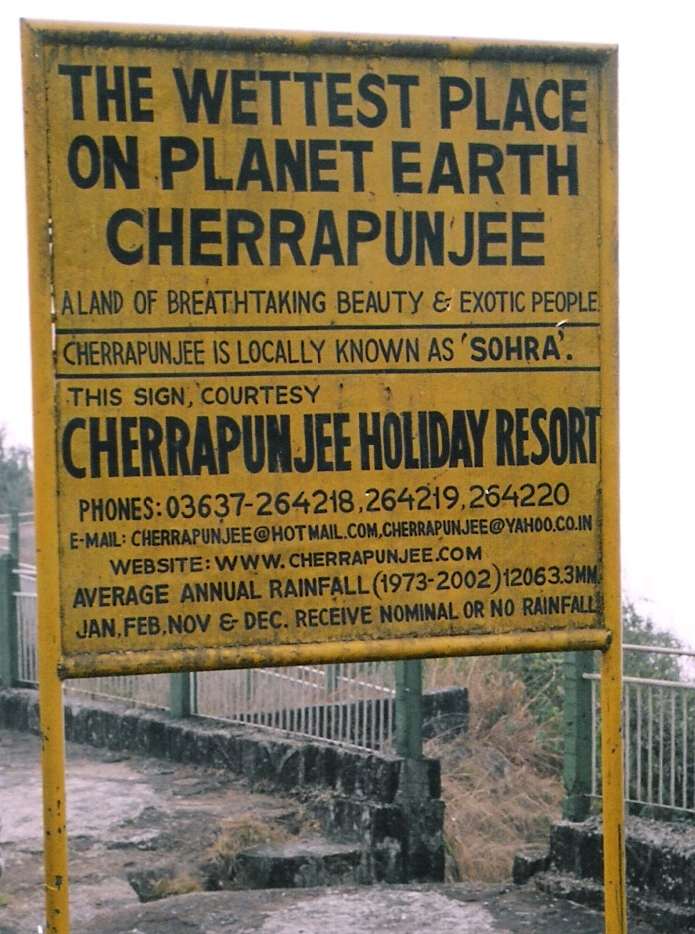
One board in Cherrapunji

== Waterfalls ==
- Nohkalikai Falls; 1,120 ft Cherapunjee (Meghalaya)
- Nohsngithiang Falls; 1,033 ft (Meghalaya)
- Langshiang Falls – 1,106 ft (Meghalaya)
- Kynrem Falls – 1,001 ft (Meghalaya)
- Sadu Chiru Waterfalls (Leimaram Falls), Kangpokpi district, Manipur
- Elephant Falls (Meghalaya)
- Panimur Falls (Assam)
- Vantawng Falls – 751 ft( Mizoram)
- Nuranang Falls Tawang (Arunachal Pradesh)
- Chmapawati Kunda (Assam)
- Akashiganga Falls (Assam)
- Sivakunda Falls (Assam)
- Bishop Falls (India)(Meghalaya)
- Khaipholangso falls (Karbi Anglong, Assam)
- Belughat falls (Karbi Anglong, Assam)
- Kangthilangso falls (Karbi Anglong, Assam)
- Dumla waterfalls (khowai, tripura)
- Dumbur waterfalls (tripura)
- Tuilha Kol(Chalwa) Water falls (Kanggui district, Manipur)

== Lakes ==
- Khecheopalri Lake, originally known as Kha-Chot-Palri (meaning the heaven of Padmasambhava), is a sacred lake for Buddhists and Hindus, which is believed to be a wish-fulfilling lake. It is near Khecheopalri village, 147 kilometres (91 mi) west of Gangtok and 34 kilometres (21 mi) to the northwest of Pelling town in the West Sikkim district of the Northeastern Indian state of Sikkim.
- Gurudongmar Lake is one of the highest lakes in the world at an altitude of 17,100 ft (5,210 m). It lies in the district of North Sikkim in the state of Sikkim in India.
- Lake Tsongmo or Changu Lake is a glacial lake in the East Sikkim, India, some 40 kilometres (25 mi) from Gangtok at elevation of 3,780 m (12,400 ft).
- Loktak Lake is the largest freshwater lake in the entire Northeast India is famous for its phumdis (heterogeneous decomposing mass of vegetation, soil, and organic matters) floating over it. Keibul Lamjao National Park, the only floating national park in the world, floats over it. It is near Moirang in Manipur state, India. Moreover, Loktak Day is a great annual event for the Lake.
- Pumlenpat is the second largest lake in Manipur situated in the Thoubal district of the state. Small islands and islets are the awe inspiring views of the lake. Besides, it is famous for the rich marine life and phytoplanktons.
- Lake Shilloi is located in Phek District, Nagaland. Shilloi lies on the lower slopes of the hill ranges running along Myanmar. It is surrounded by hills. The lake spreads over 0.25 to 0.30km^{2}.
- Umiam Lake is a reservoir in the hills 15km to the north of Shillong in the state of Meghalaya.
- Chandubi Lake is natural lake in the Kamrup district of Lower Assam 64km from the city of Guwahati accessible through National Highway 37.
- Dipor Bil, also spelt 'Deepor Beel' (bil or beel means "lake" in the local Assamese language), is to the southwest of Guwahati city, in Kamrup district of Assam, India.
- Son Beel (Shon Bill) is one of the largest lakes in southern Assam in India. It is situated in the Karimganj district, and is the largest wetland in Assam state.
- Rudrasagar Lake also known as Rudijala, is in Melaghar, Tripura.
- Bijoy Sagar, also called Mahadeb Dighi, in Udaipur, Tripura is one of the largest lakes in Udaipur in Tripura.
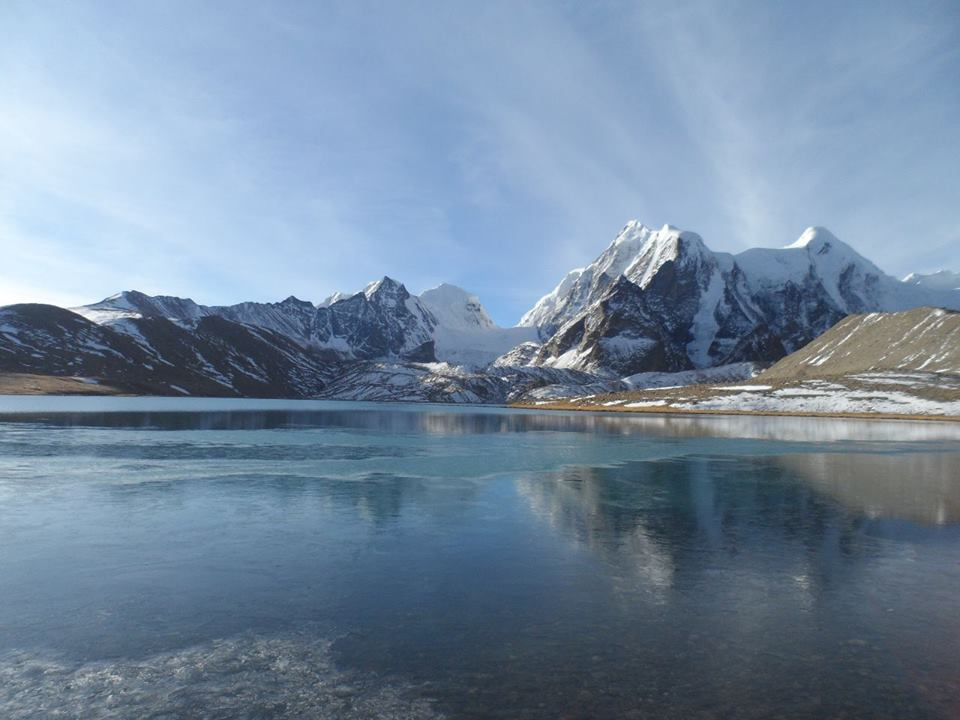
Gurudongmar Lake

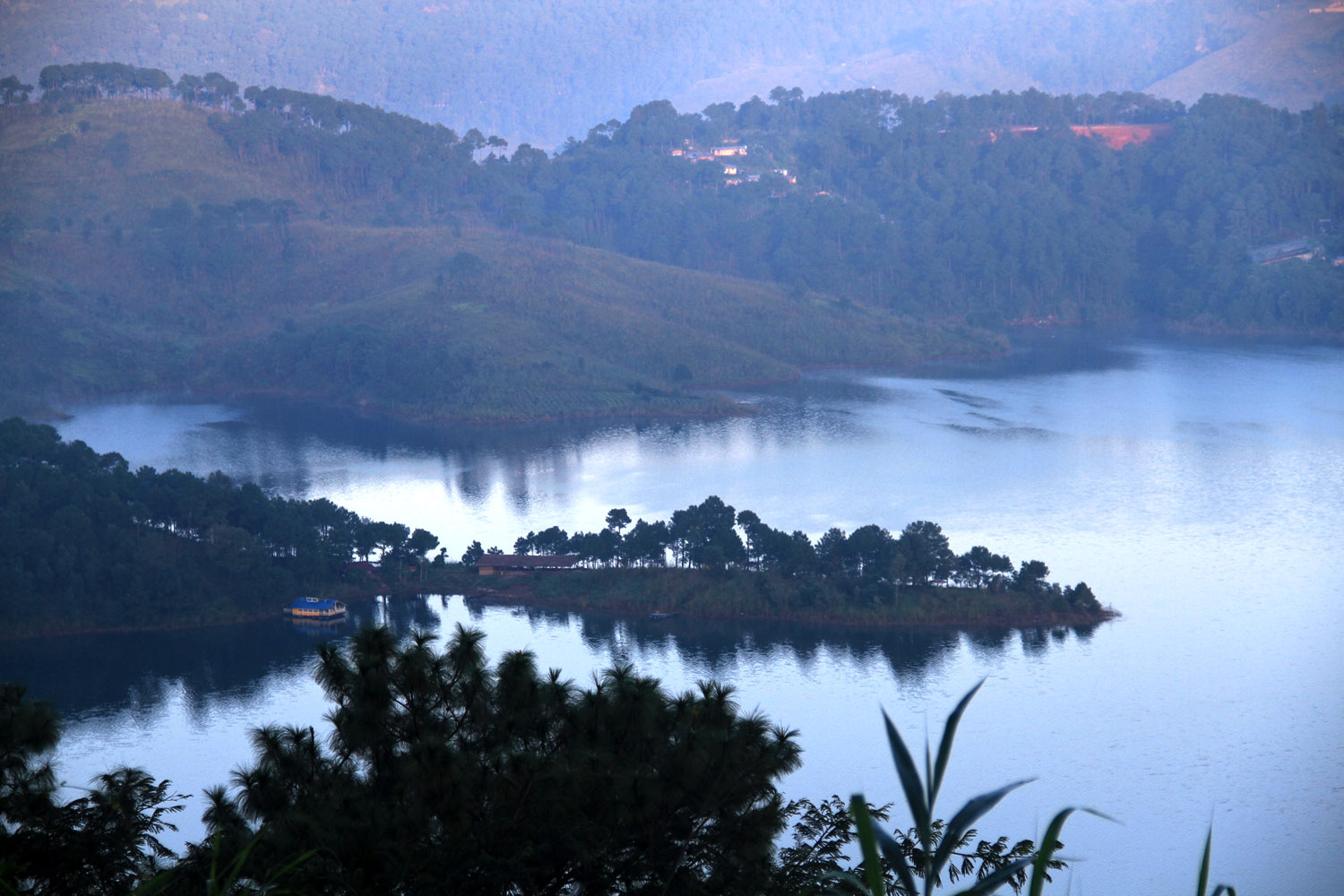
View of Umiam Lake, Shillong

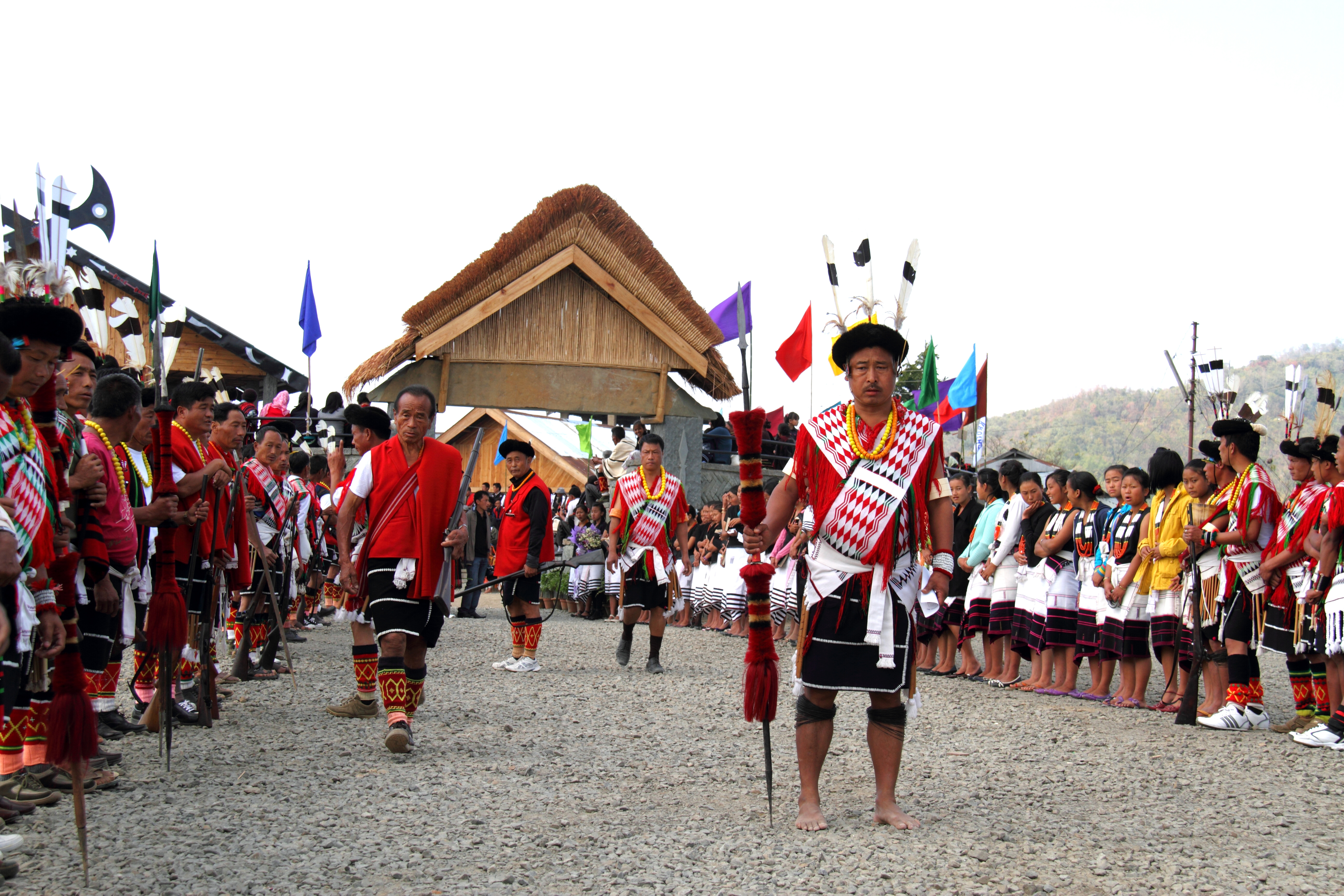
The Naga Hills are the traditional homeland of the Naga people

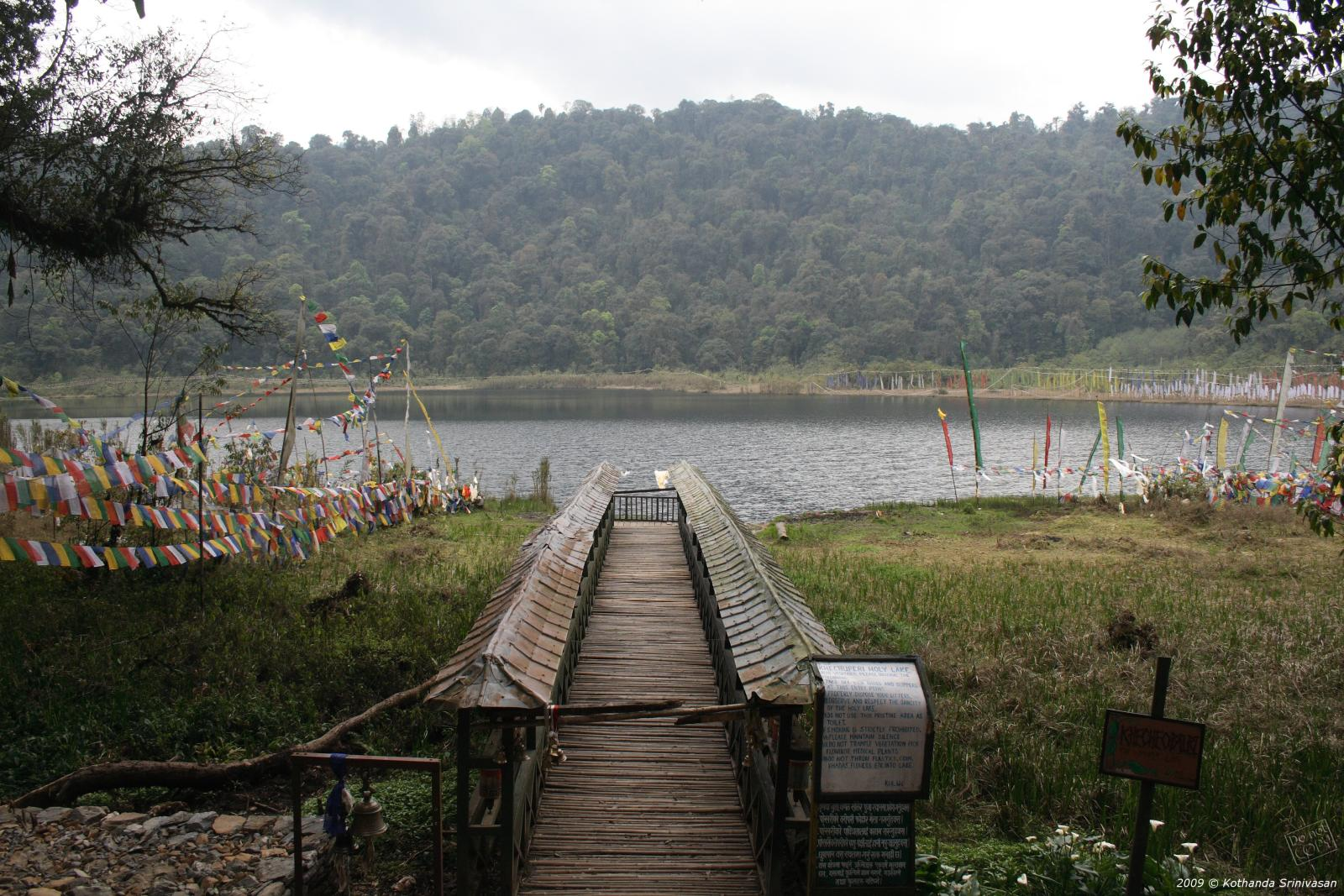
Foot bridge to Khecheopalri Lake

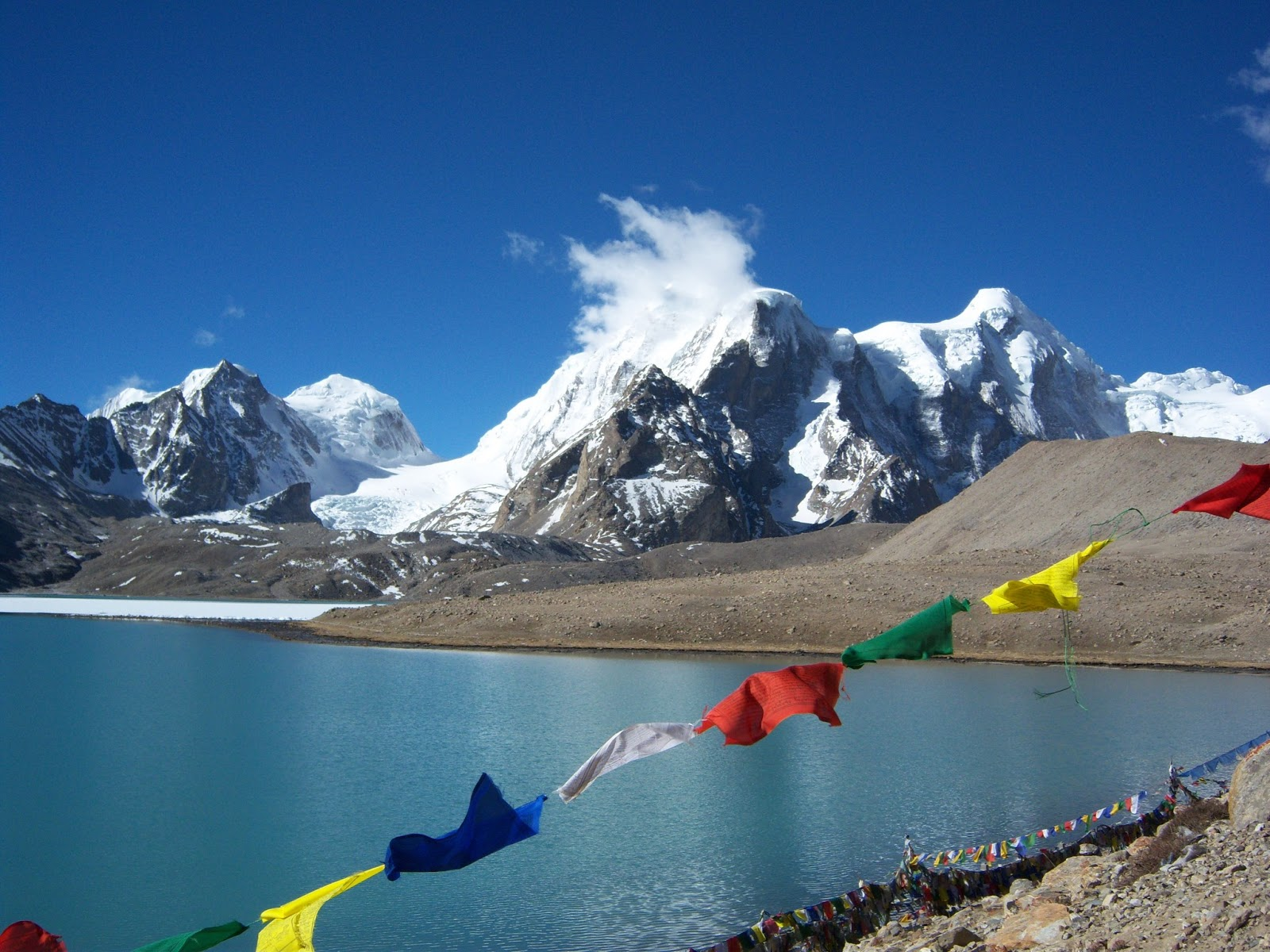
Gurudongmar Lake

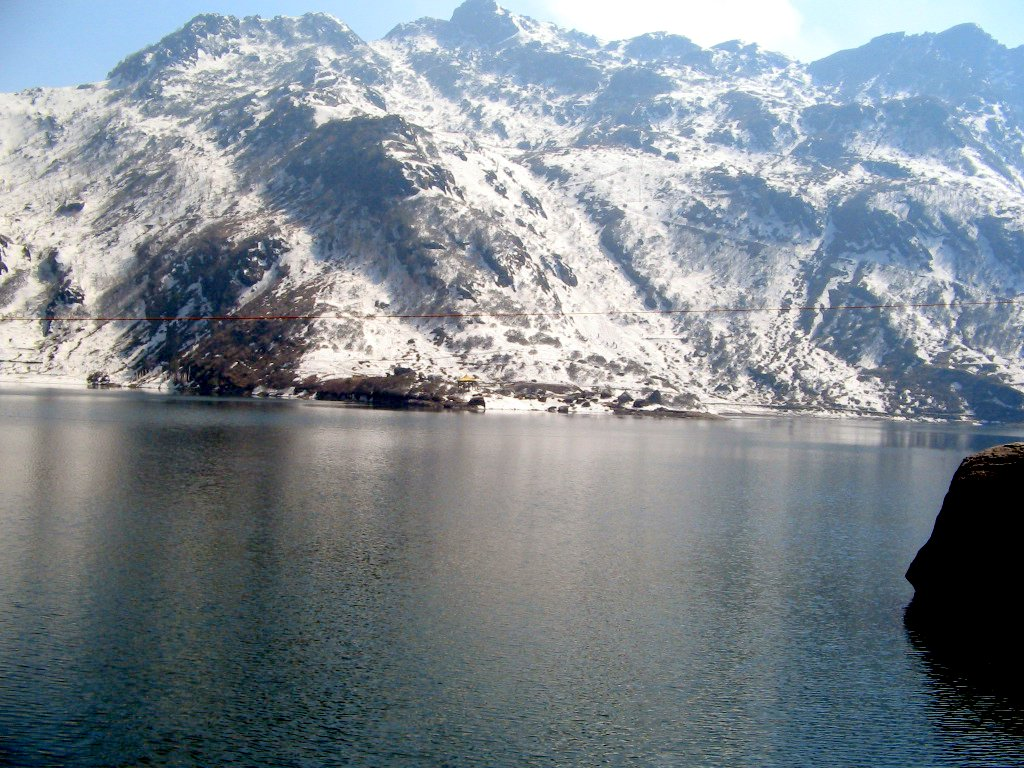
Tsongmo Lake in March

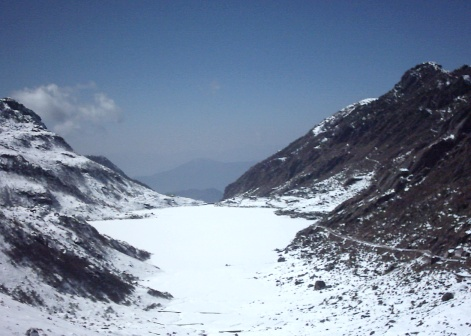
Tsongmo Lake in winter

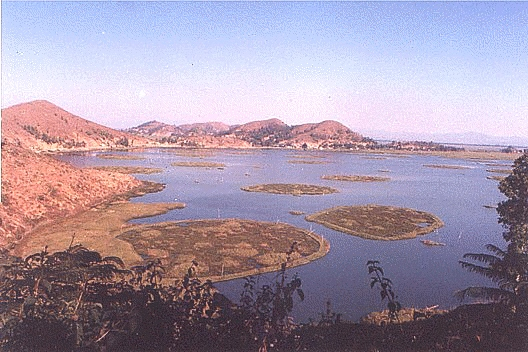
Loktak Lake

== Lake islands and islets ==
There are innumerable islands and islets in several lakes of the region. Some of them are,

- Thanga Island – It is the largest island in the Loktak Lake, world's only floating lake, situated in Bishnupur district of Manipur. It is a great tourist destination for adventure and a religious destination for both Hindu and Sanamahists. It is also famous for its numerous temples as well as sacred sites.
- Karang Island – It is the second largest island in the Loktak Lake. It is a great religious destination, famous for the residence of two temples, Ebudhou Khuman Apokpa and Ibudhou Khumanpokpa of the ancestral deity Khuman Pokpa of the Khuman Dynasty of Manipur.
- Ithing Islet – It is a human inhabited Islet situated on the way to Thanga Island in the Loktak Lake.

== River islands ==
- Majuli or Majoli is a large river island in the Brahmaputra River, Assam, India, famous for Vaishnavite Satras. The island had a total area of 1,250 square kilometres (483 mi^{2}). Majuli is the largest river island and the first island district in the India. It is also recognised by Guinness Book of World Records as World's Largest River Island.
- Umananda Island, also known as Peacock island, is the home to Umananda temple and it is the smallest inhabited river island in the world.
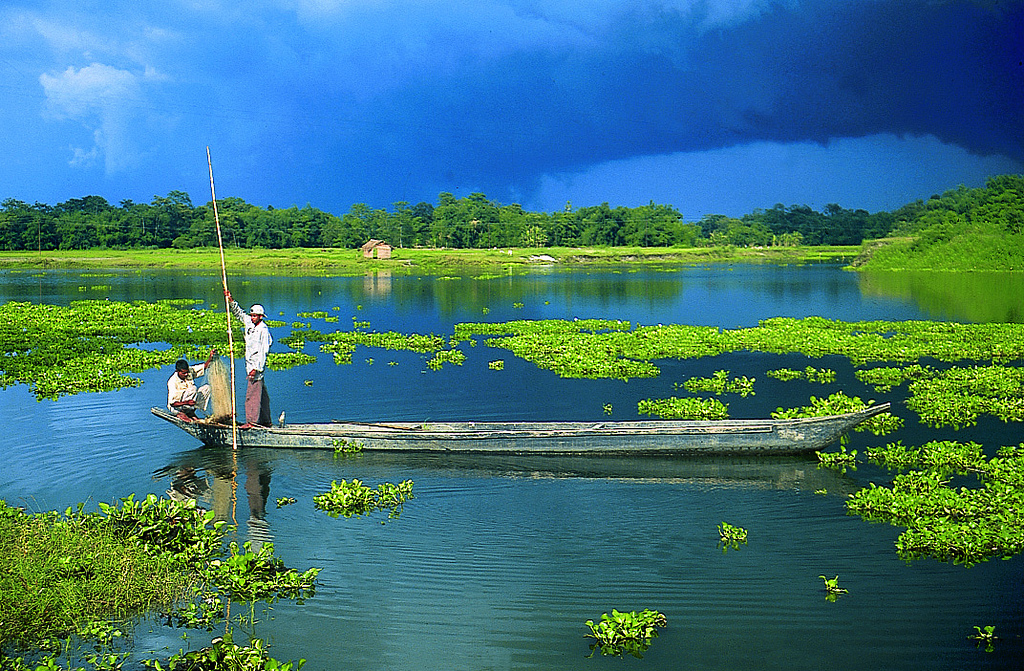
An exotic view of Majuli

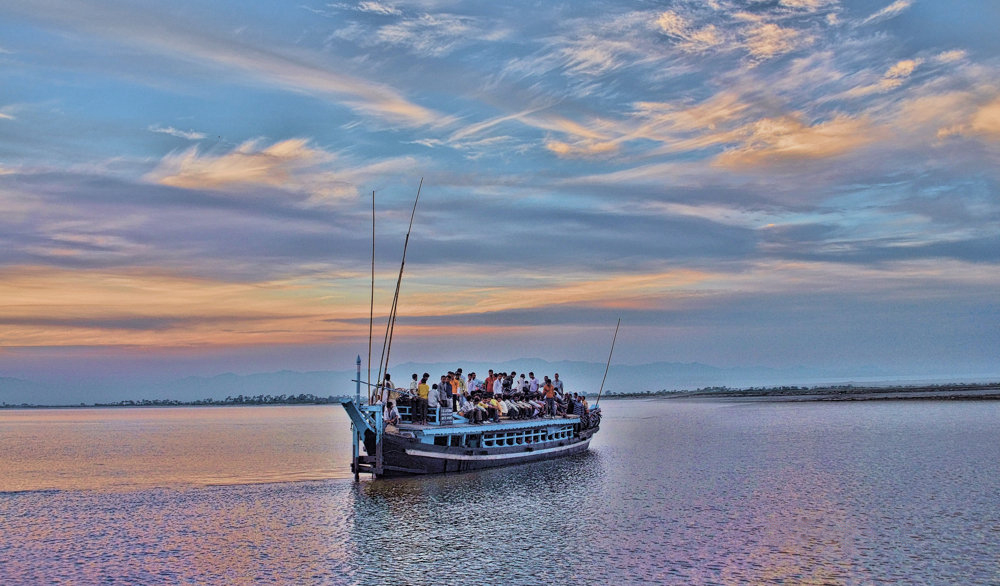
Way to Majuli from Jorhat City

== Monasteries ==
- Pemayangtse Monastery is a Buddhist monastery in Pemayangtse, near Pelling in the northeastern Indian state of Sikkim, 140 kilometres (87 mi) west of Gangtok.
- Tawang Monastery in the Indian state of Arunachal Pradesh is the largest monastery in India and second largest in the world after the Potala Palace in Lhasa, Tibet.
- Zang Dhok Palri Phodang is a Buddhist monastery in Kalimpong in West Bengal, India. The monastery is atop Durpin Hill, one of the two hills of the town. It was consecrated in 1976 by the visiting Dalai Lama.
- Rumtek Monastery, also called the "Dharmachakra Centre", is a gompa in the Indian state of Sikkim near the capital Gangtok. It is a focal point for the sectarian tensions within the Karma Kagyu school of Tibetan Buddhism that characterize the Karmapa controversy.
- Enchey Monastery is in Gangtok, the capital city of Sikkim in the Northeastern Indian state. It belongs to the Nyingma order of Vajrayana Buddhism.
- Tashiding Monastery is a Buddhist monastery of the Nyingma sect of Tibetan Buddhism in Western Sikkim, northeastern India. It is on top of the hill rising between the Rathong chu and the Rangeet River.
- Dubdi Monastery, occasionally called 'Yuksom Monastery,' is a Buddhist monastery of the Nyingma sect of Tibetan Buddhism near Yuksom, in the Geyzing subdivision of West Sikkim district.
- Ralang Monastery is a Buddhist monastery of the Kagyu sect of Tibetan Buddhism in southern Sikkim, northeastern India. It is 6 km from Ravangla.
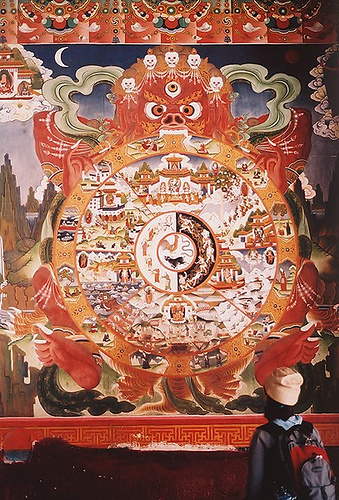
The mandala at the "Kakaling", the entry gate to the Tawang Monastery.

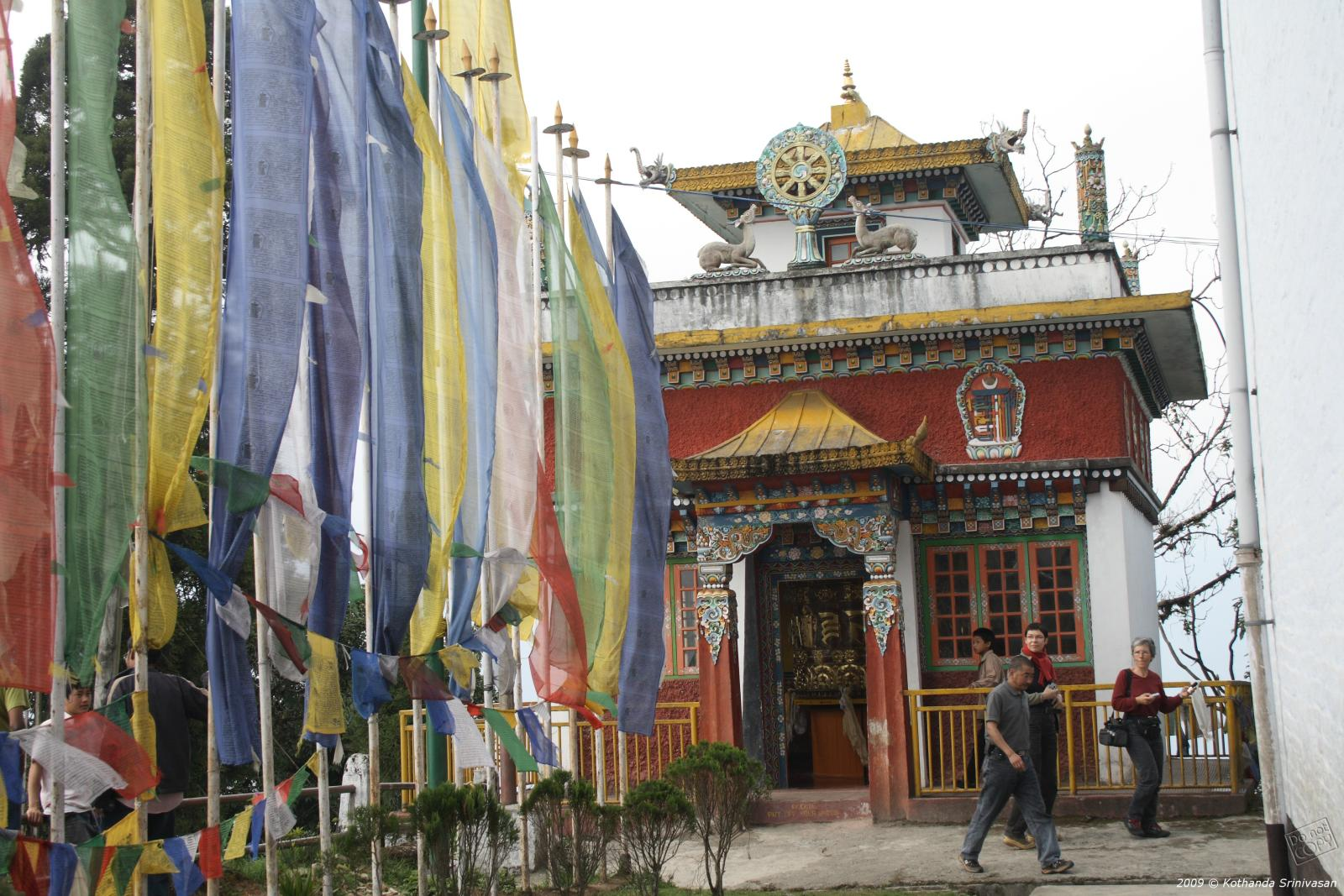
Pemayangtse Monastery.

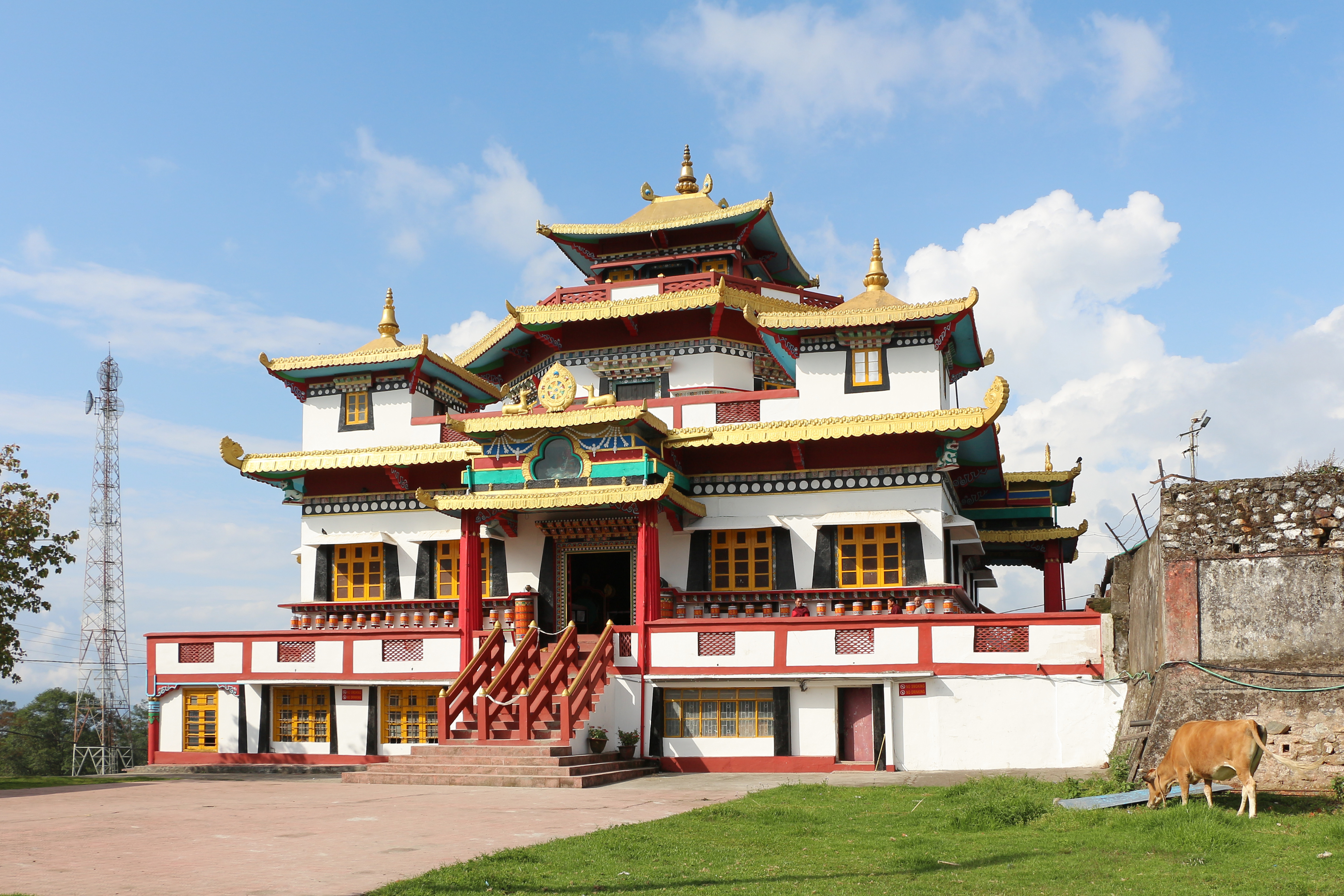
The Zang Dhok Palri Phodang monastery atop Durpin Hill.

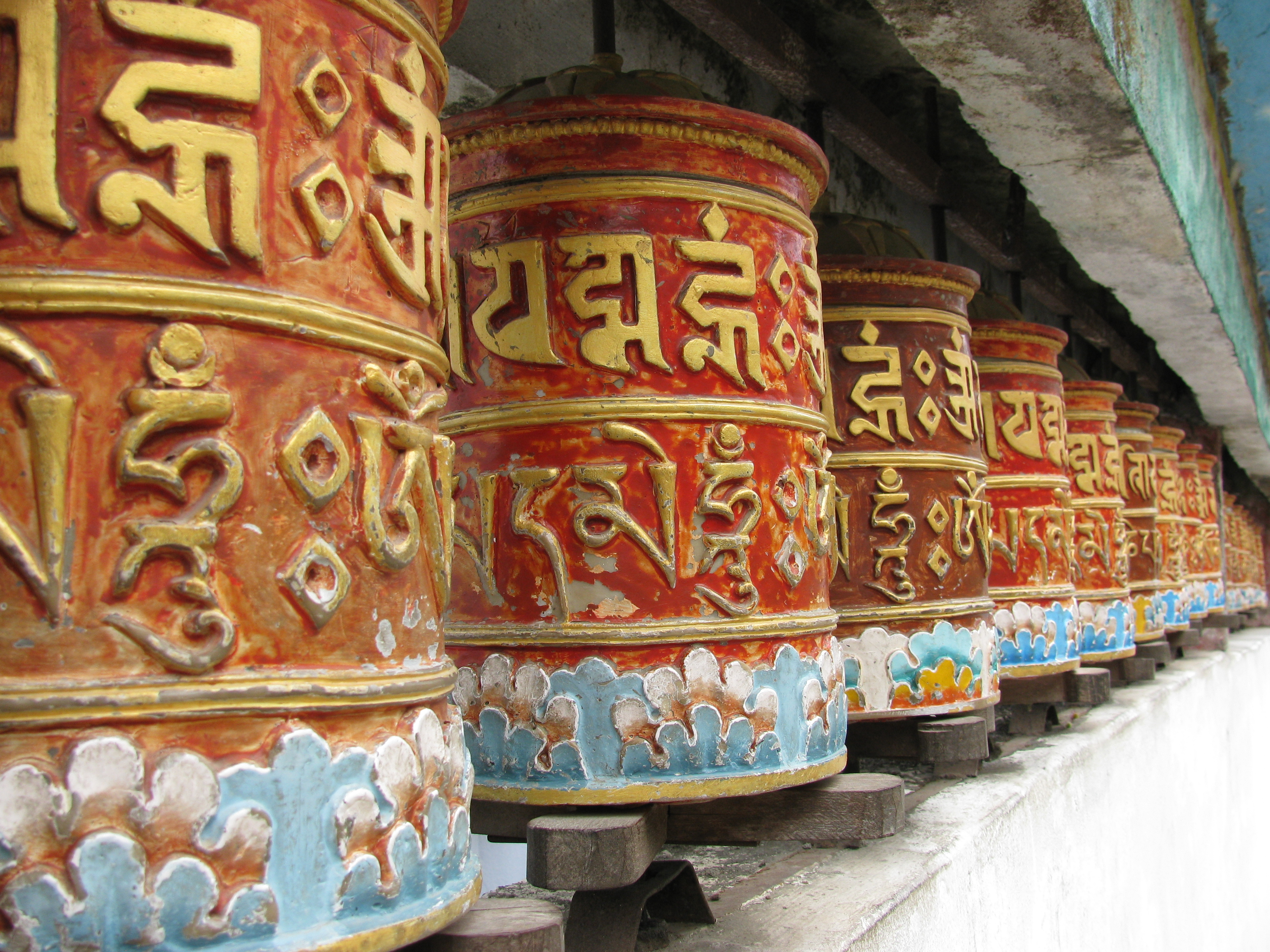
Prayer wheels in the Rumtek Monastery.

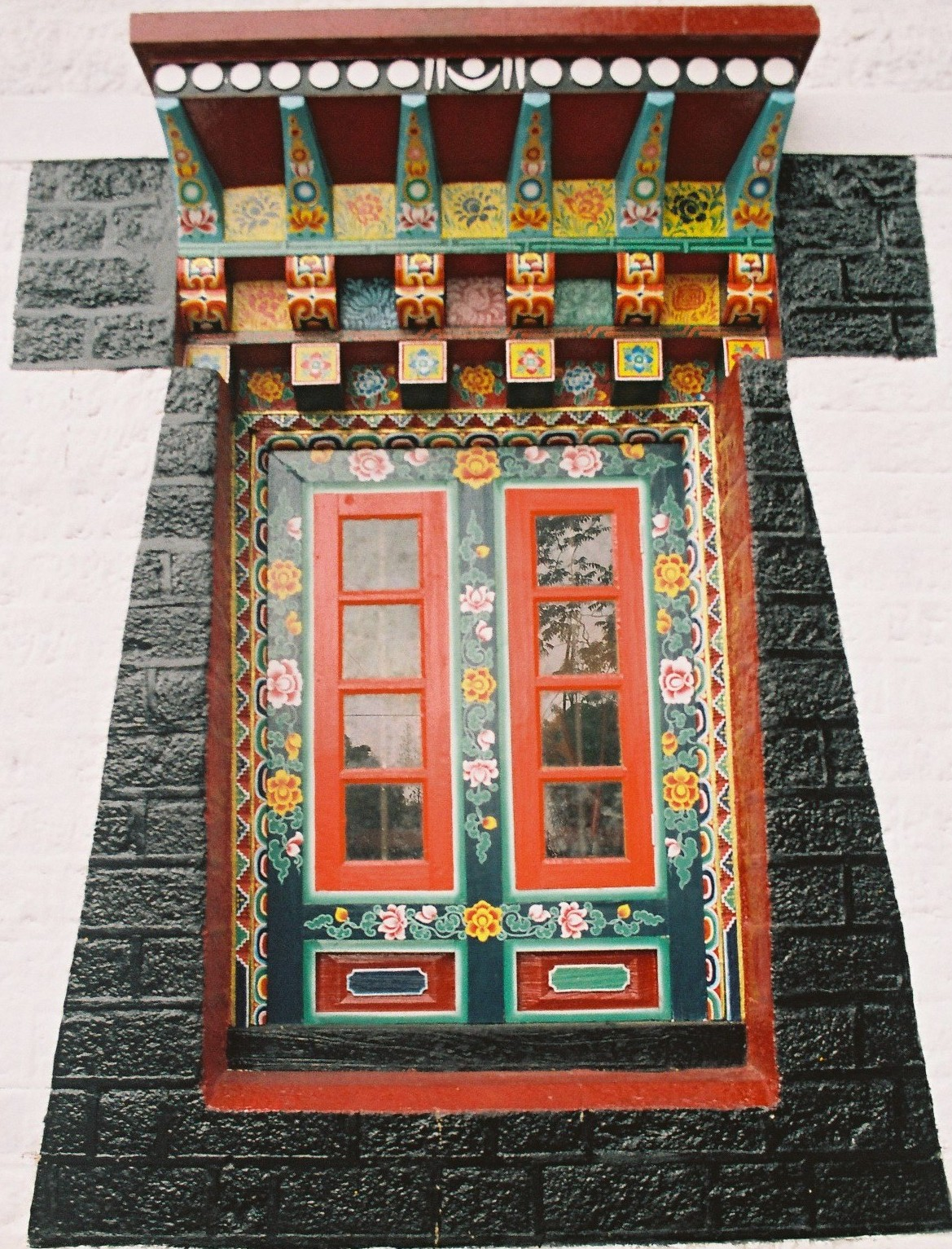
Ornately carved colourful window of Enchey Monastery.

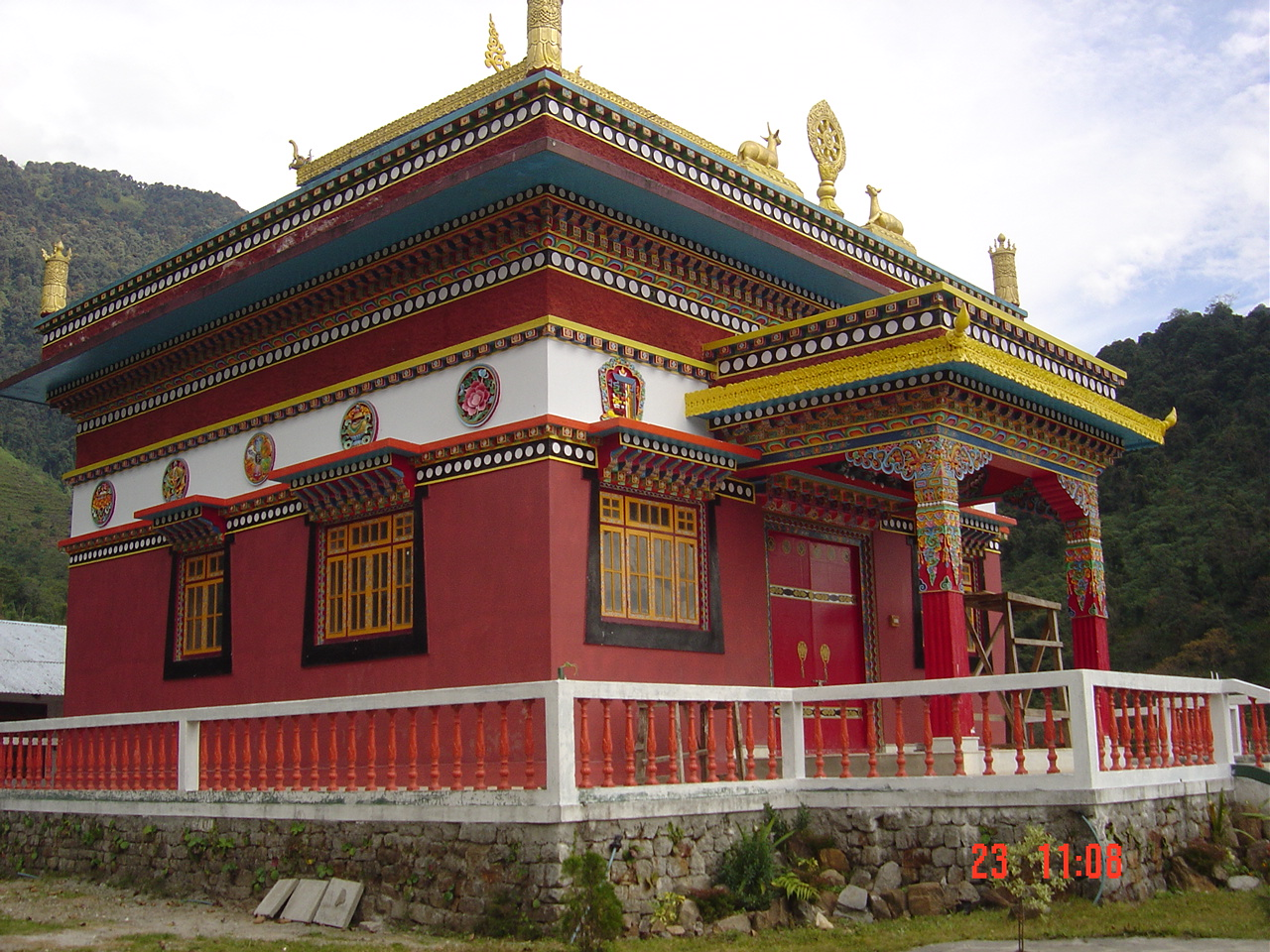
Dubdi Monastery.

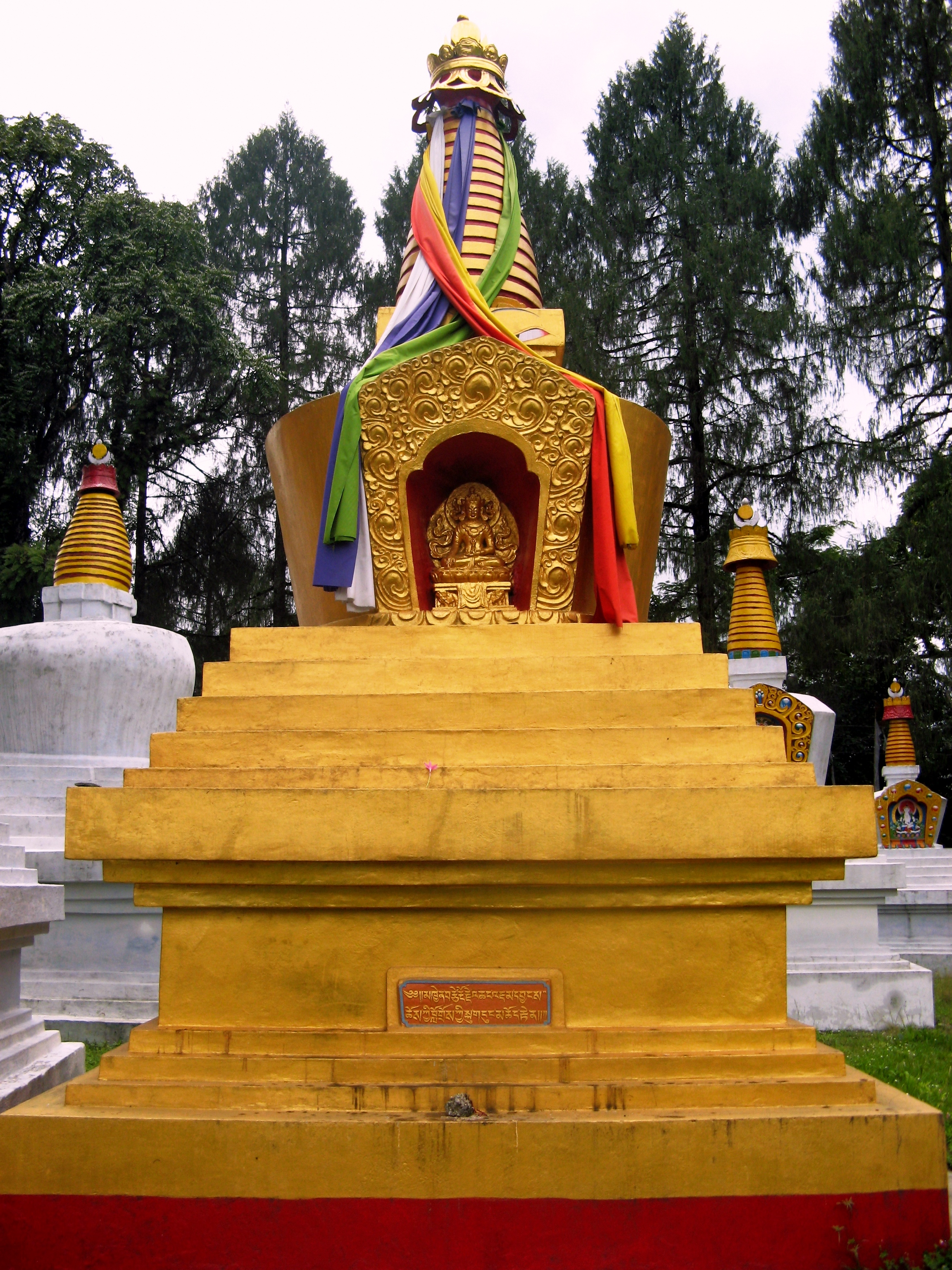
The Golden Chorten near Tashiding Monastery.

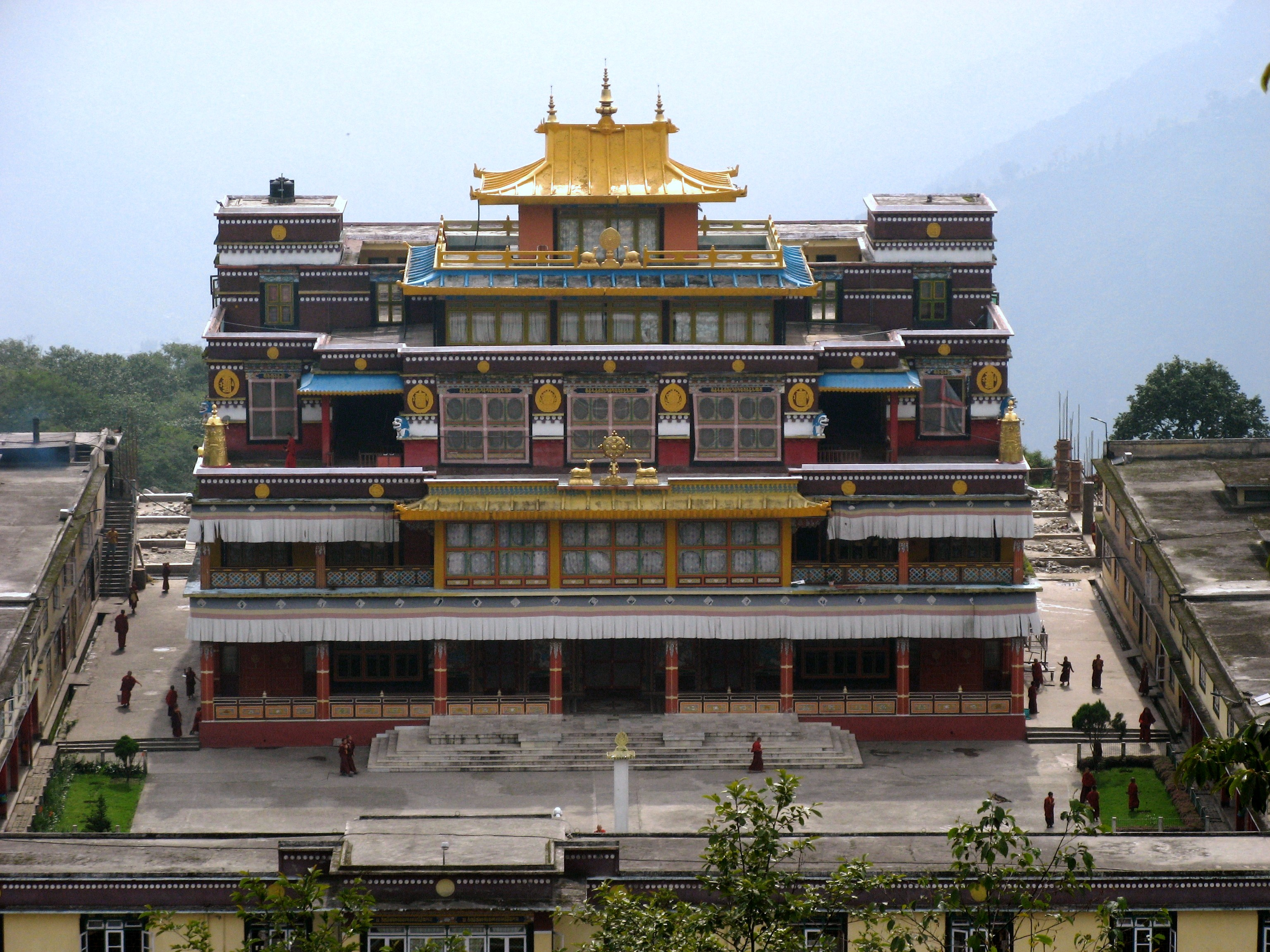
Ralang Monastery.

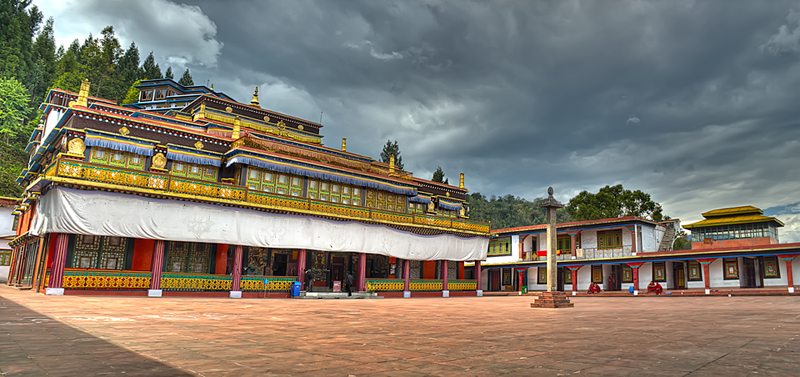
Rumtek Monastery, Sikkim, India.

== Ancient Hindu sites ==
- Rock carvings
  - Tripura
    - Chabimura, 15th-16th century Hindu rock carvings
    - Unakoti, 7th-9th century Hindu rock carvings
- Shaktipeetha: there are 3 Shaktipeetha in Northeast
  - Assam's Kamakhya Temple Shaktipeetha in Guwahati
  - Meghalaya's Nartiang Durga Temple Shaktipeetha and 600-year-old temple
  - Tripura's Tripura Sundari Temple Shaktipeetha

== Temples ==
- Shree Govindajee Temple – It is the largest Hindu Vaishnavite temple in the entire Manipur state. This temple in Imphal East district is the first premise where the great classical dance Manipuri dance is performed, dedicated to Shri Govindajee.
- Shri Radha Raman Temple, Kanchipur – It is one of the oldest Hindu temple in North East India. Situated in Kanchipur, Manipur, it is a great religious destination for the Vaishnavite followers.
- Gopinath Mandir – It is the second largest Hindu temple in Manipur. Located in Ningthoukhong, Bishnupur district of the state, it is also a grand premise for the performance of the great Manipuri dance, dedicated to Shri Gopinath.
- Kaina Temple – It is a Hindu temple in the Hill top of the Kaina Hill in Thoubal district of Manipur. It is a great religious destination for Vaishnavite followers from across the country. It is famous for the grand feasts performed as well as for the scenic beauty of the hillside.
- Dah Parvatiya – It is a temple built in the 6th century, dedicated to Shiva.
- Kamakhya Temple – It is a Hindu temple in Assam, and a great religious destination for Shaktism followers.
- Joy dol – The second largest temple built based upon Nilachal architecture.
- Na-Pukhuri Shiva Dol – Last temple built during Ahom era which displays grandeur.
- Sivasagar Sivadol – It is a temple dedicated to Shiva, built in 1734 by Ahom queen Ambika. It is one of the tallest Shiva temples in India.
- Negheriting Shiva Doul – It is a grand temple dedicated to Shiva situated in hillock, built during the reign of Rajeswar Singha.
- Barpeta Satra – It is one of the most prominent Satra of Assam, it was first built by Madhavdev in the 16th century.
- Dakhinpat Satra – One of the influential and prominent Satra of Assam, established by Ahom king Jayadhwaj Singha in the mid 17th century.

== Forts and Palaces ==
- Kareng Ghar – It was the residence of the Ahom kings, this place originally consisted of 7 storeys and was reconstructed in brick in the mid 18th century.
- Kareng Ghar – This was the residence of the Ahom kings. It originally had 7 storeys and was reconstructed brick by brick in the mid-18th century.
- Talatal Ghar – It served as the parliament and residence of Ahom kings, it is the biggest monument built during the Ahom era.
- Talatal Ghar – This was initially built as a military base, but also served as a residence for the Ahom royal family. It is the grandest monument built during the Ahom era.
- Kangla Palace – This is one of the oldest sites in the world, dating back to 1405 BC when King Tangja Leela Pakhangba ascended the throne of Kangleipak (present day Manipur).
- Kangla Fort – It is one of the oldest forts in the world, with its earliest existence dates back to 1405 BC when King Kangba, son of king Tangja Leela Pakhangba held power in Kangleipak (present day Manipur). It is a place of major tourist attraction as well as religious destination having more than 365 sacred sites associated with Sanamahism.

== War memorial sites ==
- Imphal War Cemetery – It is an important war cemetery, having 1600 burials, maintained by Commonwealth War Graves Commission, situated in Dewlahland, 10 km away from Imphal International Airport, Manipur.
- Khongjom War Memorial Complex – Situated in Thoubal district of Manipur, this complex highlights the Anglo-Manipur War, held in Khongjom, a small hillock in 1891. World's tallest sword structure is the main tourist attraction in the site.
- Red Hill – or Maibam Lotpa Ching, this hillock is a memorial site of the Second World War Battle of Imphal. The Japan War Memorial Complex is also present in the foothills, constructed by the Government of Japan.

== Monuments and other tourist spots ==
=== Living root bridges ===
The living root bridges of Cherrapunji aren't built – they are grown over hundreds of years, in the rainforest of Cherrapunji. They are alive, growing and gaining strength over time. They are also present in Laitkynsew, and Nongriat.

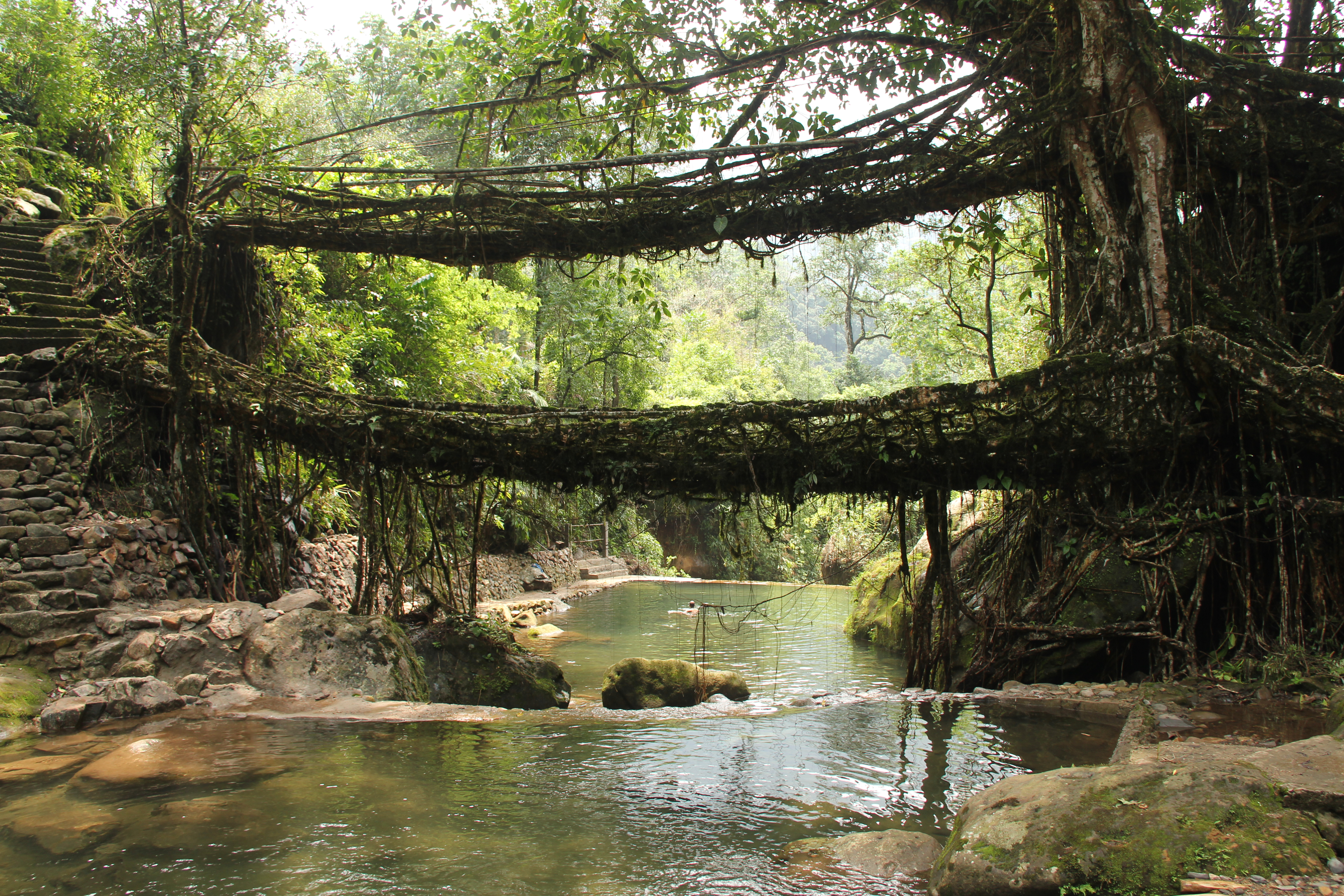

=== Madan Kamdev ===
Madan Kamdev is a famous archaeological site in Kamrup district of Assam. This site has ruins of huge and small temples scattered around an old temple of Shiva: Gopeshwar Temple is near a village and a big cave nearby is known as Parvati Guha.

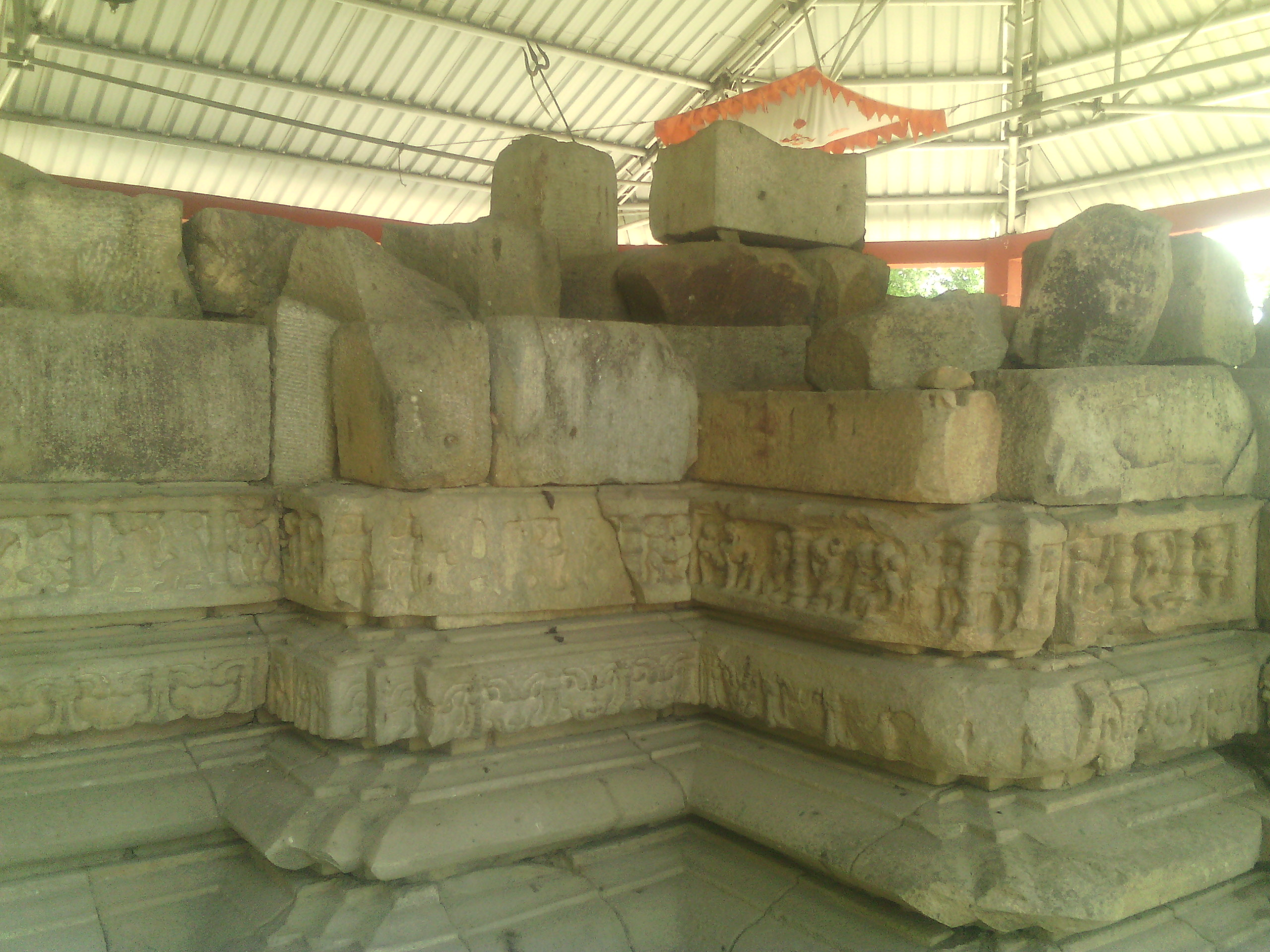

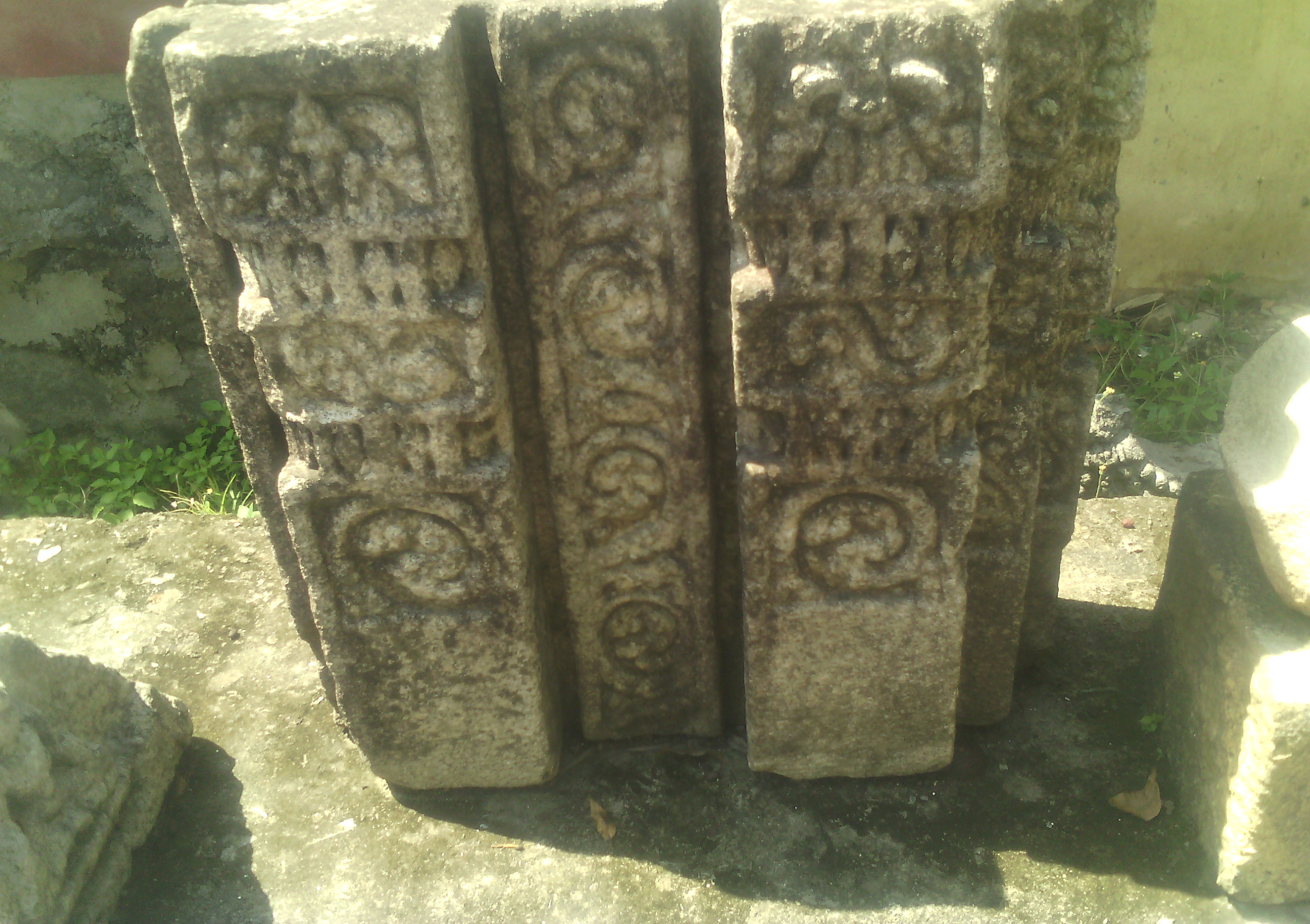

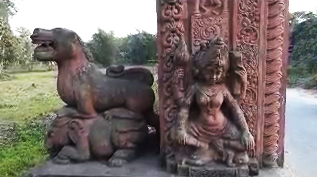

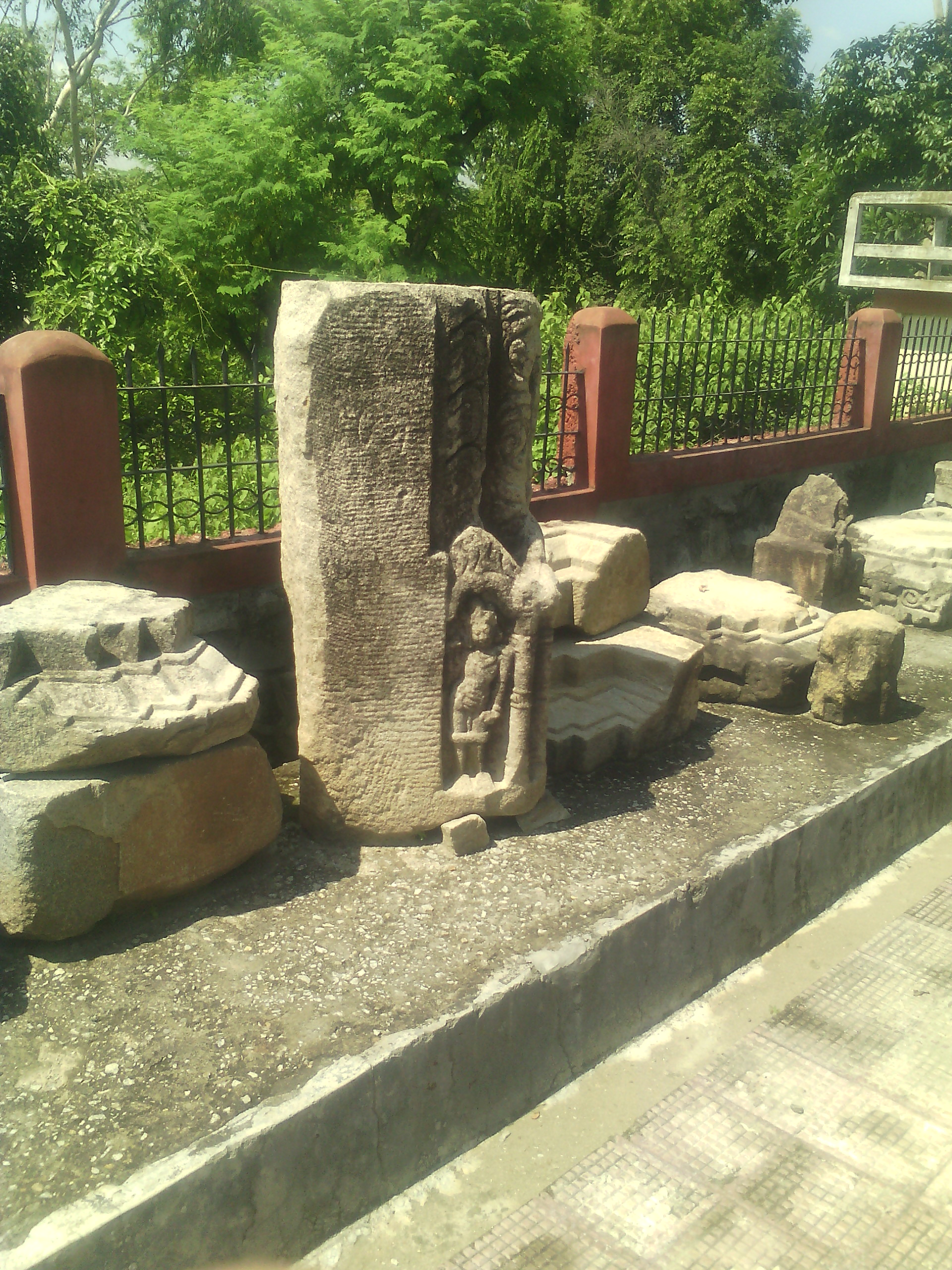

=== Meghalaya caves ===
The Indian state of Meghalaya is famous for its many caves, which attract tourists from India and abroad. A few of the caves in this region have been listed amongst the longest and deepest in the world. A famous one is Mawsmai caves near Cherrapunji are the limestone caves, lies near the village of Mawsmai. Meghalaya is famous in the world for its deep caves such as the Siju Cave; Krem Liat Prah is the longest cave in Asia.

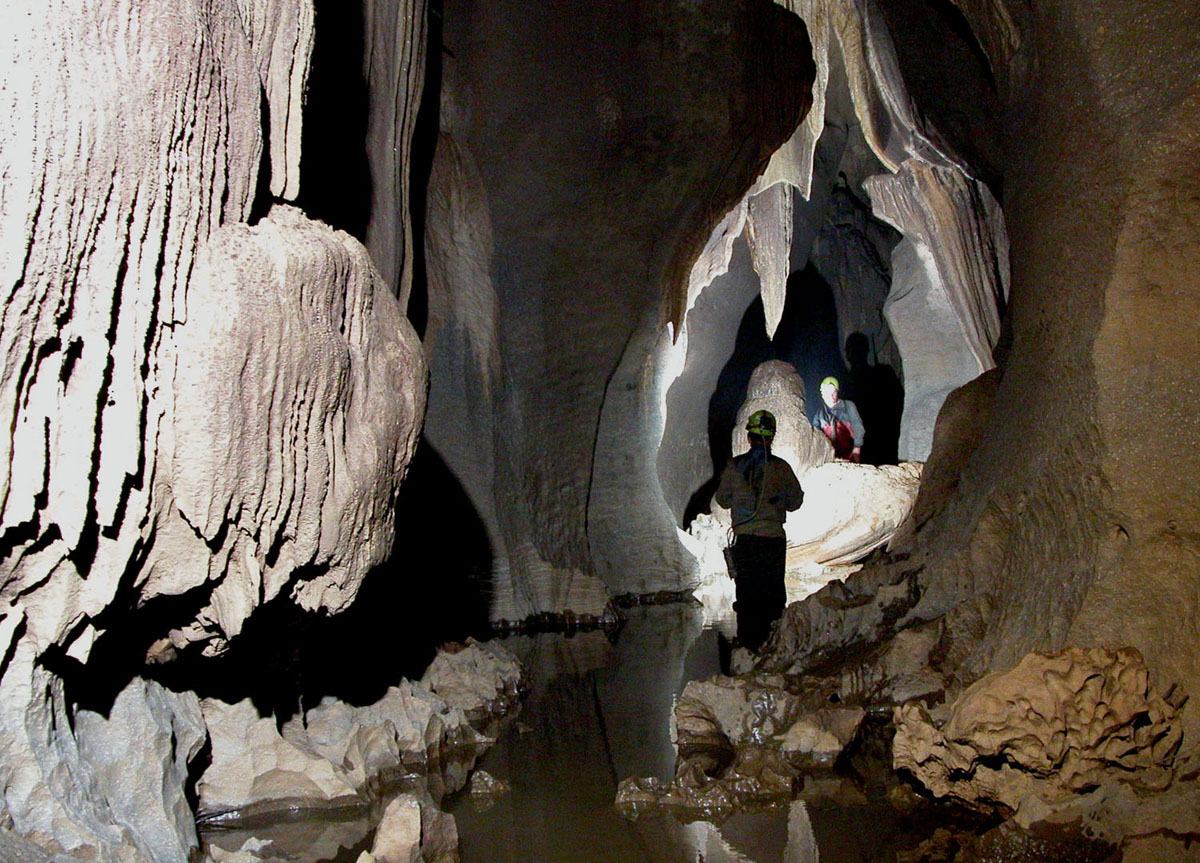
Expedition in progress in Meghalaya Caves.

== Capital cities ==
=== Agartala ===
Agartala is capital of Tripura state. Its second largest city in Northeast India after Guwahati. Places of attraction in Agaratala:

- College Tilla – Maharaja Bir Bikram College, Tripura University buildings, football ground, international cricket stadium, picturesque lush landscapes and serene natural lakes. It is also a National Bird Sanctuary.
- Ujjayanta Palace – Palace of the Tripura kings, was converted to state legislative assembly and is now into a museum; in the area of Palace Compound is one of the eye-catching attraction in the state.
- Jagannath temple – Hindu temple of Vaishnava school of thought. It has been transformed into the Ujjayanta Museum and it was inaugurated by Dr. Hamid Ansari, the vice president of India.
- Umamaheswar temple – Hindu temple of Shaiva and Shakti (durga).
- Venuban Buddha Vihar – Around 2 km inside the city of Agartala from the city center is the Venuban Vihar where a Buddhist shrine houses a metal statue of the Buddha.
- Krishna Mandir
- Puratan Agartala (Old Agartala)
- Malancha Niwas – Rabindranath Tagore, the first Asian Nobel Laurete had stayed here during his visit to Tripura.
- Agartala Amusement Park, Amtali- Chocolate Hotels Pvt Ltd
- Agartala City Centre – The main hub point in the city, in Paradise Chowmuhuni, carries a lot of attraction in the capital.
- Agartala Secretariat – Approximately 3 km from the heart of the city, this is a splendid place to watch the biggest government building in Northeast India.
- Rabindra Kanan
- Nehru Park
- Heritage Park
- Tripura State Museum is at the Ujjayanta Palace.
- Science Museum, in Sukanta Academy.
- Haveli Museum, in Kashipur.
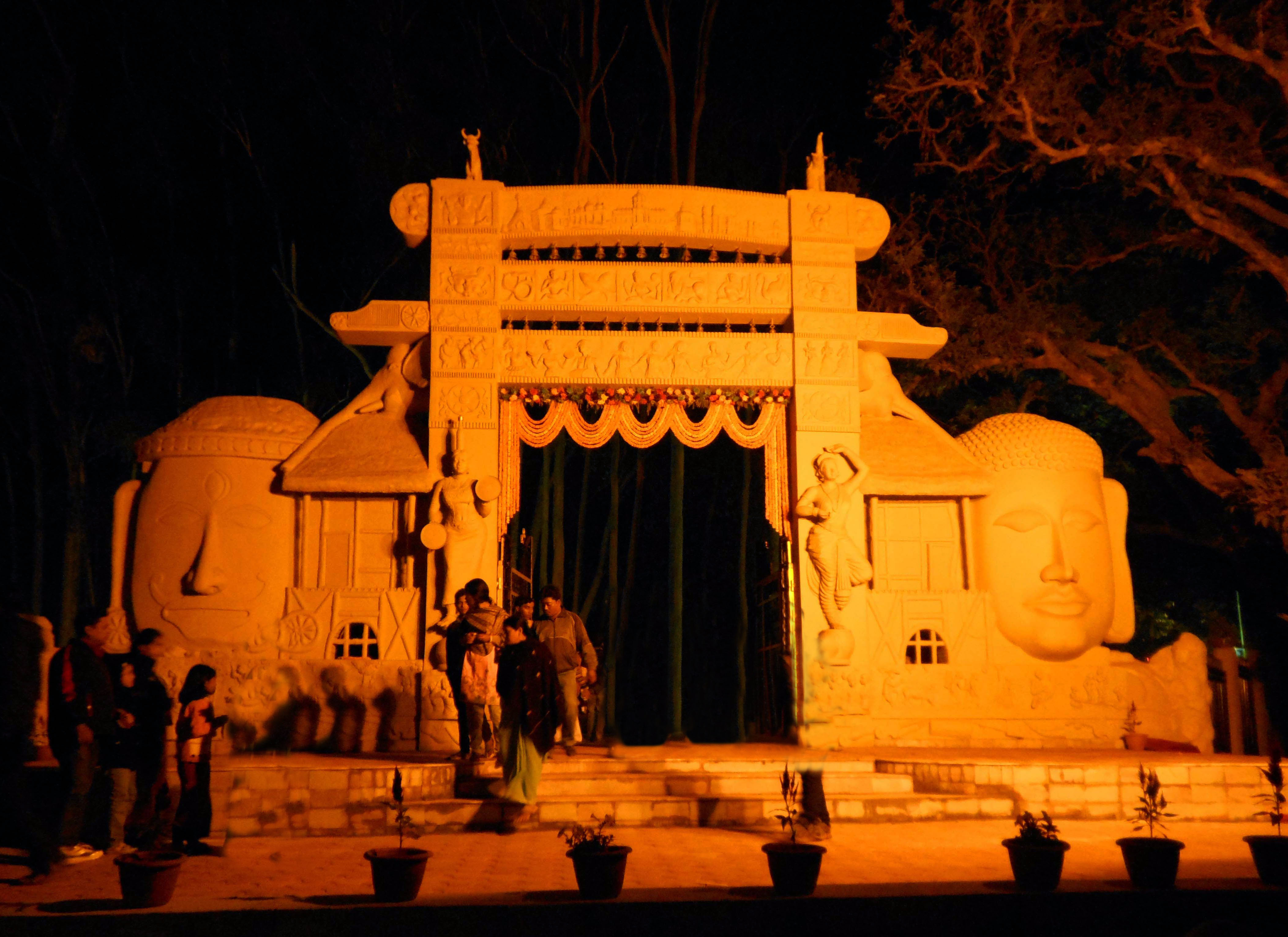
Main gate of the Heritage Park, Agartala

=== Aizawl ===
Aizawl is the capital of Mizoram state. The main places of interest in Aizawl are:

- Bara Bazar is the main shopping centre of Aizawl in Dawrpui Veng locality. The steep Zion Street is lined with stalls selling garments. The main bazar is where the people are best seen in their traditional costumes selling produce from the farms as well as imports from China brought through Myanmar. The Millennium Centre in the same locality is a popular shopping mall.
- Mizoram State Museum is in the centre of the town at Zarkawt. This museum gives a good insight into Mizo traditions, culture and history.
- Reiek Tourist Resort, a tourist spot 12 km from Aizawl, is at an elevation of 1548 metres with a traditional Mizo village.
- Durtlang Hills on the northern side of Aizawl offers a fine view of the hill station from Durtlang Hospital or Aizawl Theological College.
- Hmuifang is about 50 km from Aizawl with an elevation of 1619 metres. The mountain is covered with virgin forests reserved since the Mizo chief's time.
- Berawtlang Tourist Complex 7 km from Aizawl is a recreational centre that hosts cultural activities. It is considered a popular picnic spot.
- Baktawng Village, 70 km from Aizawl, is where Pu Ziona lives with the "worlds largest existing family" with 39 wives, 94 children, 14 daughters-in-law and 33 grandchildren.
- Solomon's Temple, Aizawl Mizoram, India in Kidron Valley, Chawlhhmun is a grand temple complex operated by Kohhran Thianghlim of Mizoram.
- Khuangchera Puk is a cave in Ailawng near Reiek, about 30 km from Aizawl.
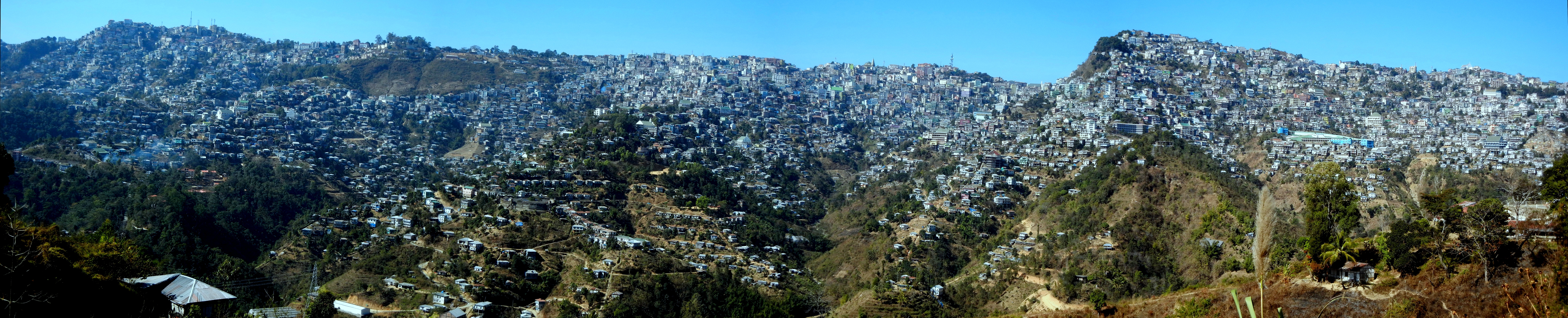
A panorama of Aizawl taken from Zemabawk.

=== Gangtok ===
Gangtok is the capital and the largest city of Sikkim state. City is known for its tourist attractions.

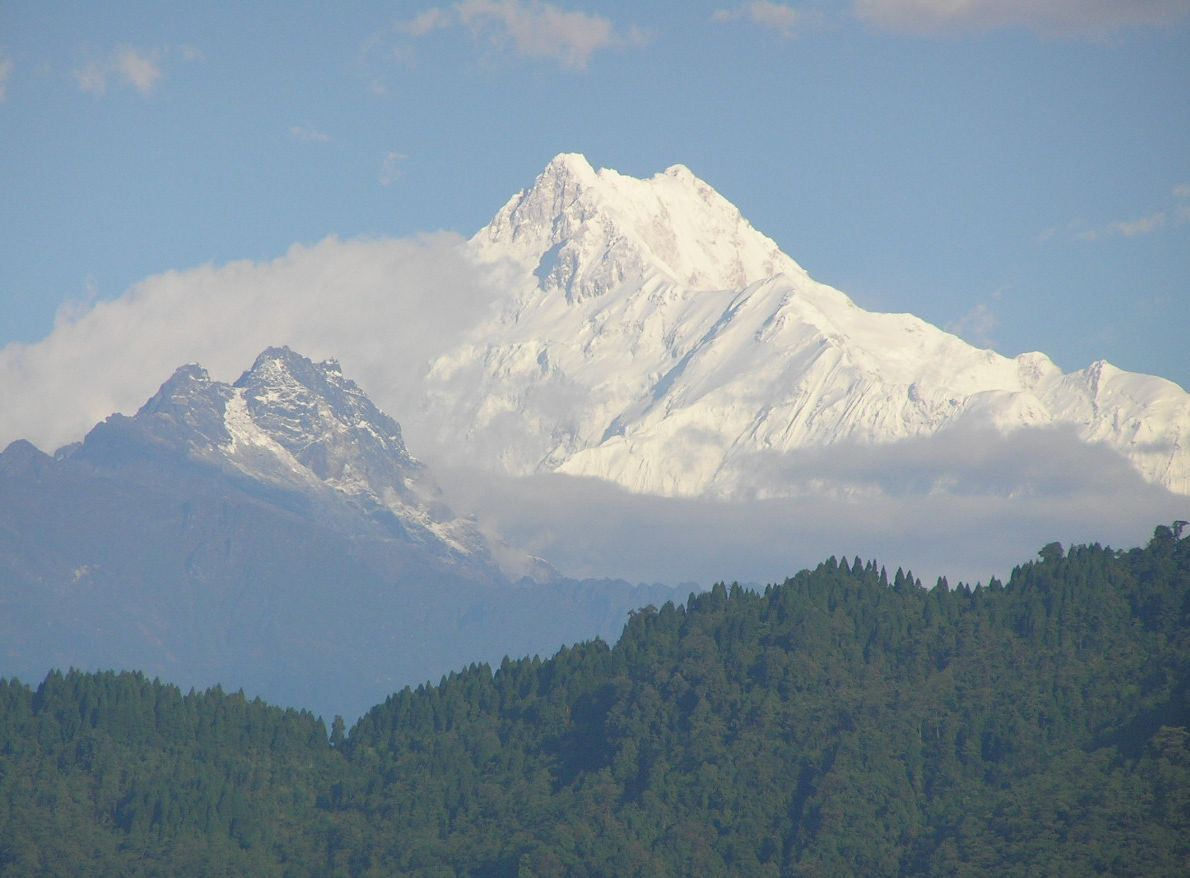
Kanchenjunga, visible from Gangtok, is the world's third-tallest peak.

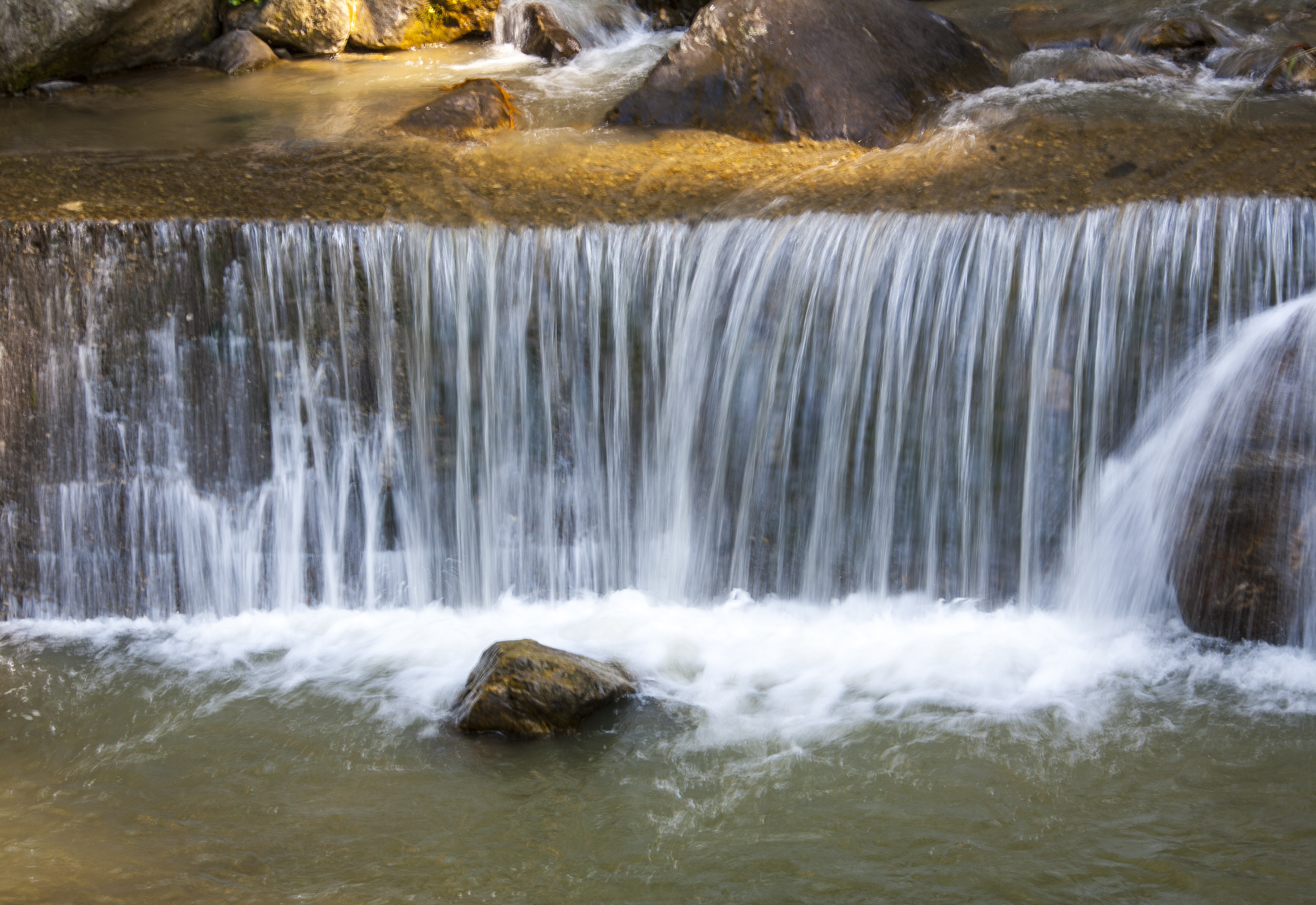
Ban Jhakri Falls, Gangtok.

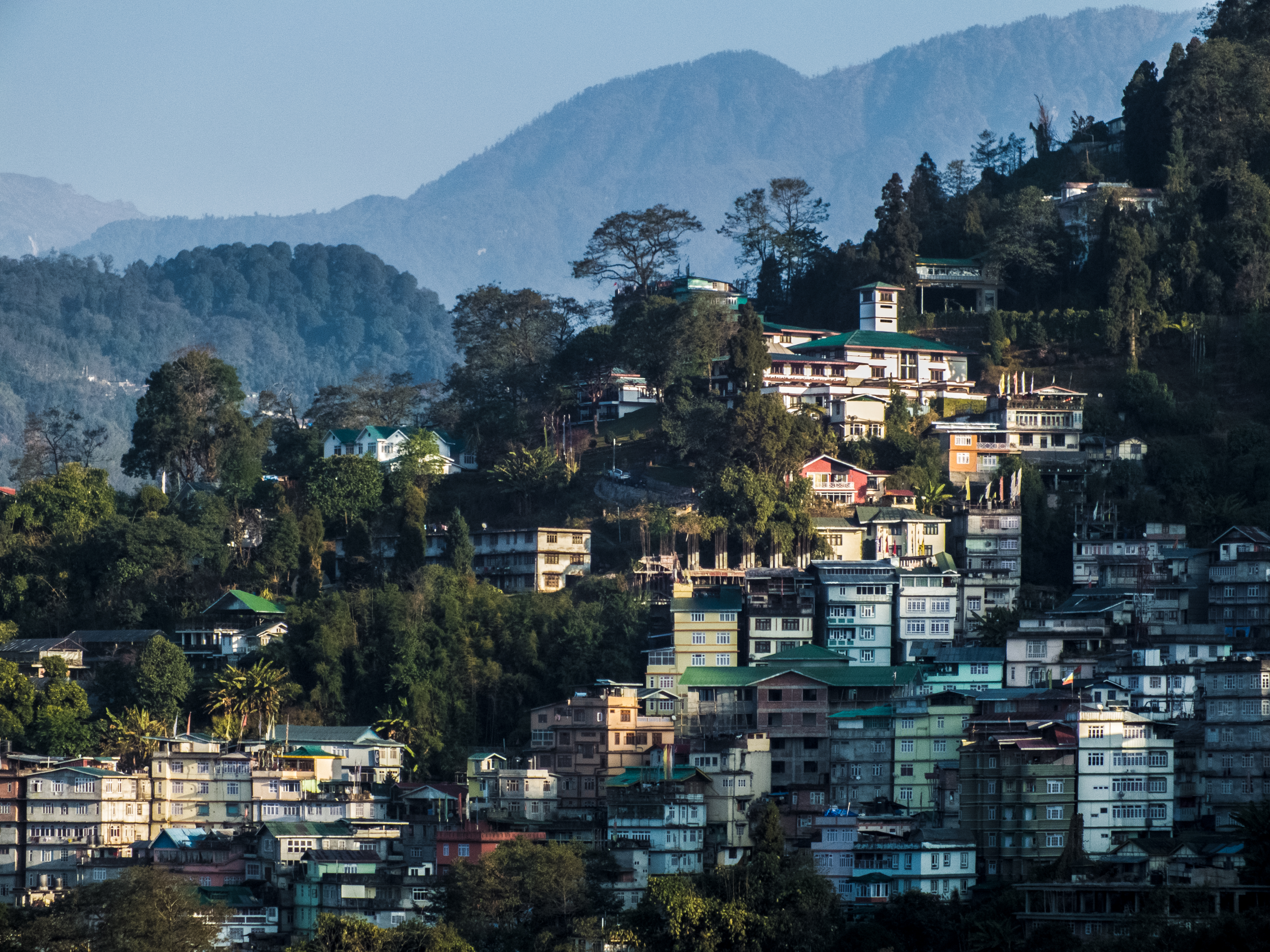
Gangtok seen from Tibet Road.

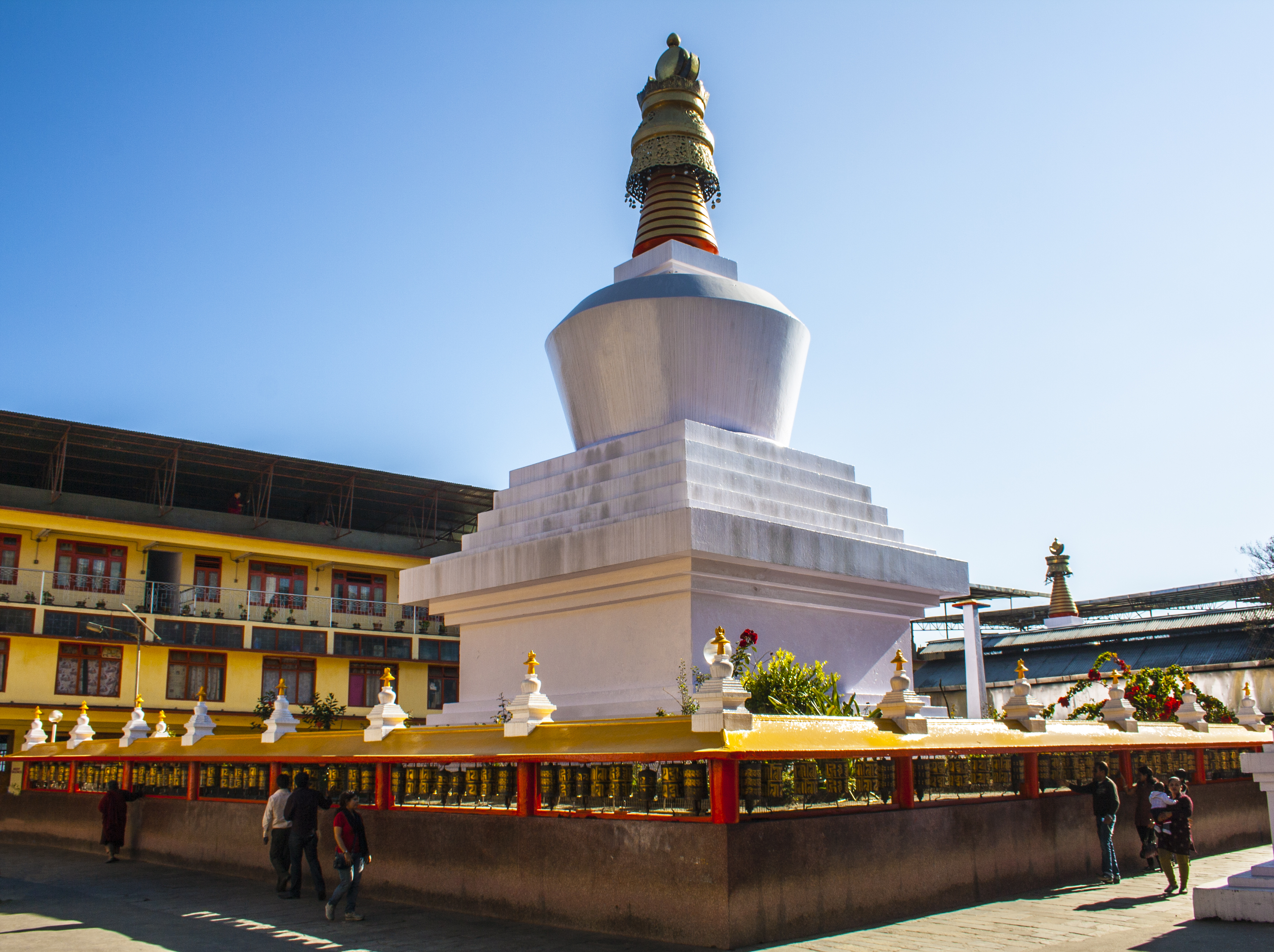
Dro-dul Chorten, Gangtok, Sikkim.

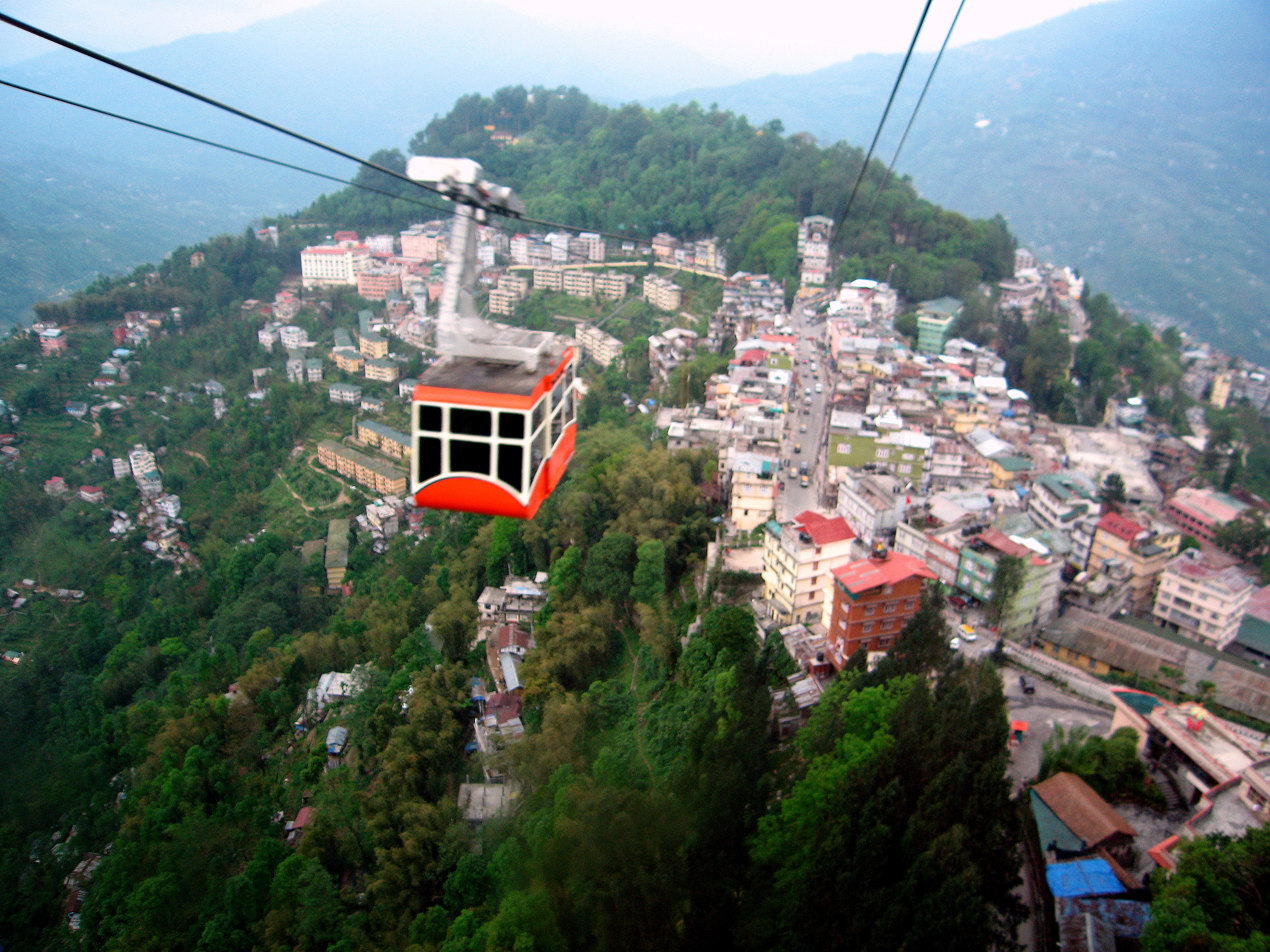
Gangtok Ropeway.

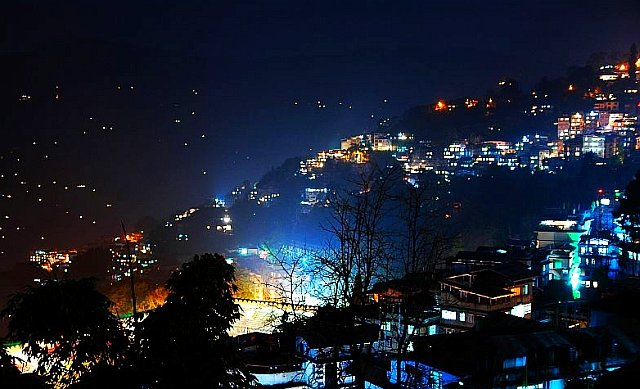
Gangtok at night.

=== Guwahati ===
Guwahati is the commercial capital of Assam state and its largest city in North East India.

- River cruise: One of the major attractions of Guwahati is the cruise on the Brahmaputra river.
- Umananda Temple: On the Peacock Island in the middle of the Brahmaputra, this Shiva temple was built in 1664. It is believed that Shiva by using his third eye burnt Kamdeva here. Every year Shivaratri is celebrated in this temple in a great way. The island is believed to be the world's smallest human inhabited island. The world's largest river island is Majuli.
- Accoland: Accoland family fun kingdom is the northeast's only amusement park named after Acco, the mythological king of amusement. This park is at Patgaon.
- Srimanta Sankaradeva Kalakshetra: Shankardev Khalakshetra's name is synonymous with the Vaishnava saint and scholar of Assam Srimanta Shankardeva. It is a multipurpose cultural complex that has fulfilled its aim in protecting, promoting and preserving the cultural heritage of the communities and tribes of Assam and the country.
- Guwahati Planetarium: In Uzanbazar this planetarium is the only one of its kind in the northeastern region and a center of astronomical research. For visitors, the mysterious aspects of the universe are brought alive by sheer audio-video technique and explained in the dark domed structure inside the planetarium.
- Assam State Museum: Assam State Museum is near Dighalipukhuri. It houses many rare, specimen of the Ahom Dynasty. Many articles of equipment, dress materials belonging to the glorious past of Assam are found here. Many antiques, statues, manuscripts, written on Shashi-paat and other valuable articles are preserved and displayed.
- Kamakhya Temple: Kamakhya Temple, some 5 km from the main city on the Nilachal Hill, is one of the most sacred Hindu shrines of India. Goddess Kamakhya is worshipped here. Ambubachi Mela is celebrated every year in the middle of June in this temple. Many devotees from across the country gathered here during this mela. Usually, it takes about four hours to complete the temple visit. However, if you are short on time, it can be covered in 1–1.5 hours by skipping the temple’s main sanctum.
- Shilpagram: Adjacent to Srimanta Shankardev Kalakshetra, this is the only crafts village of the North East Zone Cultural Center (NEZCC). It had made landmark in the promotion of the varied arts and cultures of the local people. It holds regular cultural events throughout the year in its open-air stage and auditorium.
- Nehru Park: At heart of the city at Panbazar by the side of Cotton College. The highlights of the park are the concrete statues of Bihu dance, Ojapali dance, Deodhani dance, Jhumur dance, Bhoor tal dance etc. There are altogether 45 concrete statues depicting these aspects of Assamese life and culture.
- NEDFi Haat: NEDFi Haat is at a leased building of Industries & Commerce Department Govt. of Assam. In NEDFi Haat visitors can buy handicraft and handloom products. They can buy traditional food items produced by the self-help groups of the state in the Bihu seasons.
- Assam State Zoo cum Botanical Garden: Assam State Zoo cum Botanical Garden is the largest zoo of the northeast at Hengerabari Reserved Forest in the city.
- Basistha Temple: Basistha Temple is on Sandhyachal Hill, on the southern part of the city; this tourist spot was once the ashram (hermitage) of sage Basistha.
- Sukreswar Temple: Sukreswar Temple is an ancient Shiva temple built by Ahom king Pramatta Singha on Dakini Jogini hill by the side of river Brahmaputra.
- Navagraha Temple: Navagraha temple or temple of nine planets is on Chitrachal Hill to the east. It was the ancient seat of study of astronomy and astrology. The nine planets are represented by the nine linga's inside the main temple. There is a stone imprint of solar system inside the temple. This temple is 3 km from the railway station is a center of Astrological and Astronomical research. It was for this temple Guwahati was named Pragjyotishpura.
- Dighalipukhuri: At the heart of the city at Uzanbazar and surrounded by the High Court on the north and the State Museum and District Library on the south. This is a huge man-made tank. It was excavated by King Bhagadatta to celebrate the 'swayambar' of his daughter Bhanumati who was married to Kourava prince Druyadhana. There is a boating club on the Dighalipukhuri.
- Ugro Tara Temple: At the heart of the city banks of Joarpukhuri (twin ponds). The Ugro Tara Temple is another shakti peeth temple where the eyes of Sati were believed to have fallen.
- Balaji Temple, Guwahati: This temple is a recent addition to the religious places of Guwahati. It is at Betkuchi area of the city. Balaji temple with striking South Indian architecture is unlike the other temples of this place. In the evening the temple is illuminated by electric lights.
- ISKCON Temple, Guwahati: This temple belongs to the ISKCON society founded by Abhay Charanaravinda Bhaktivedanta Swami Prabhupada. The temple's main deity is Radha-Krishna. The main emphasis of this temple's preaching lies on the teachings of Krishna and Bhagavad Gita.
- Madan Kamdev & Gopeshwar Mandir is near to Guwahati in a village named as Deuduar.
- Northbrook Gate: It was constructed to welcome British viceroy Lord Northbrook who visited Guwahati in 1874 near Sukreswar Ghat. British officials named it 'Gateway of Assam'.
- North East Crafts Museum and Showroom of Handicrafts & Handlooms: An undertaking of North Eastern Handicrafts and Handlooms Development Corporation Limited (a Govt. of India Enterprise) this showroom has a wide variety of bamboo and cane handicrafts from across Northeast India. Visitors can buy these indigenous handicraft products from the showroom. The showroom is in Garchuk in Guwahati.
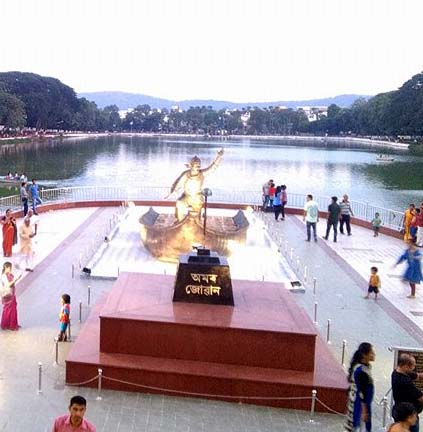
Dighali Pukhuri War Memorial

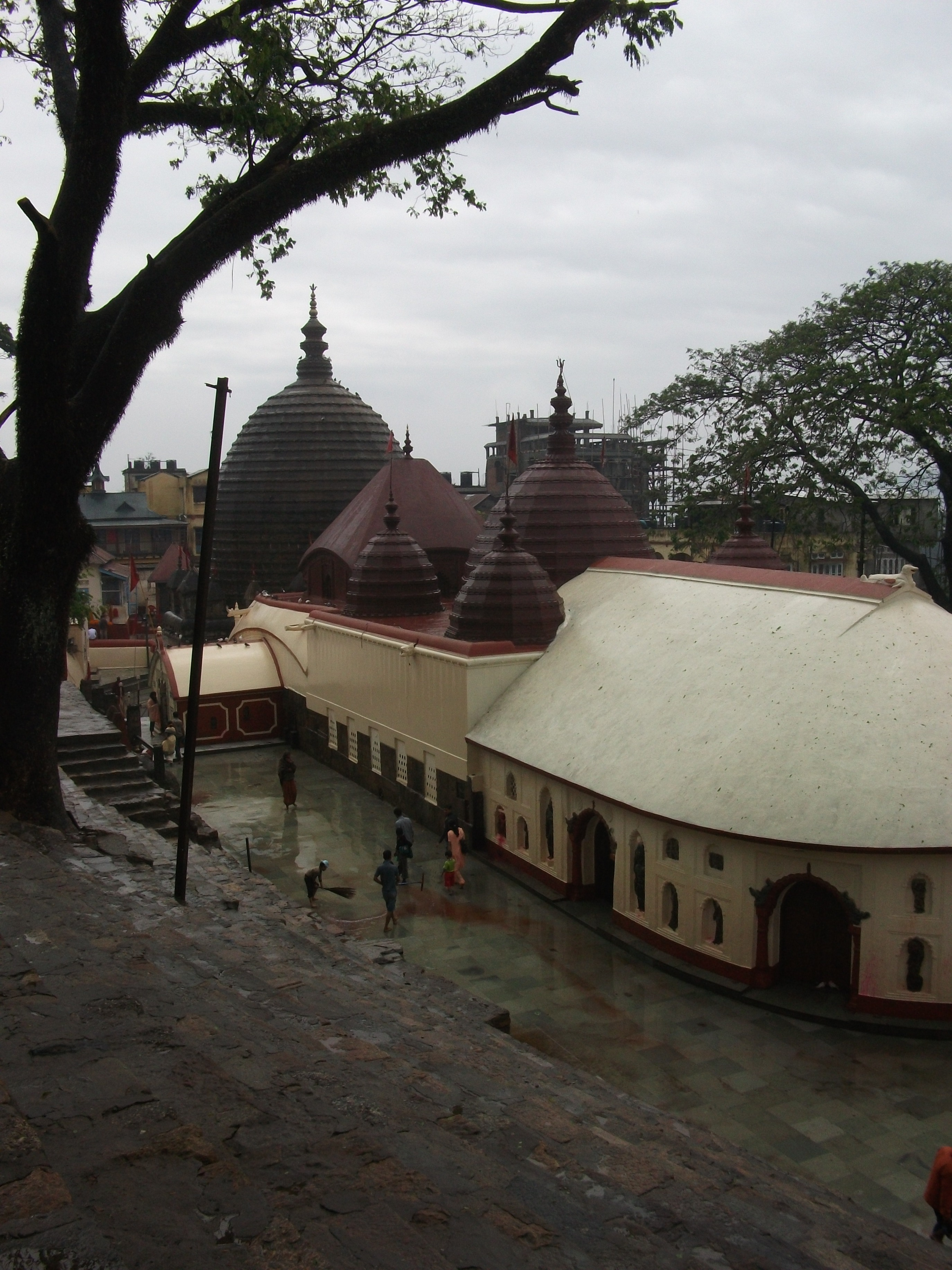
A view of Kamakhya Temple, Guwahati.

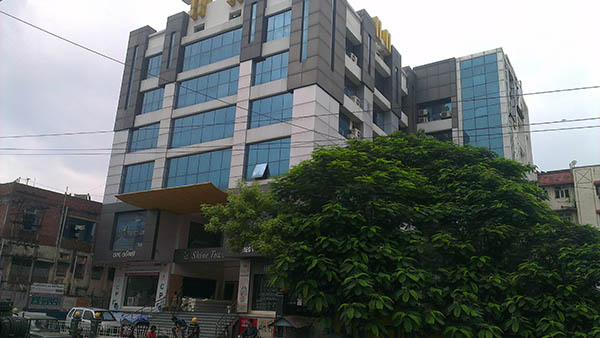
Shine Towers, Guwahati.
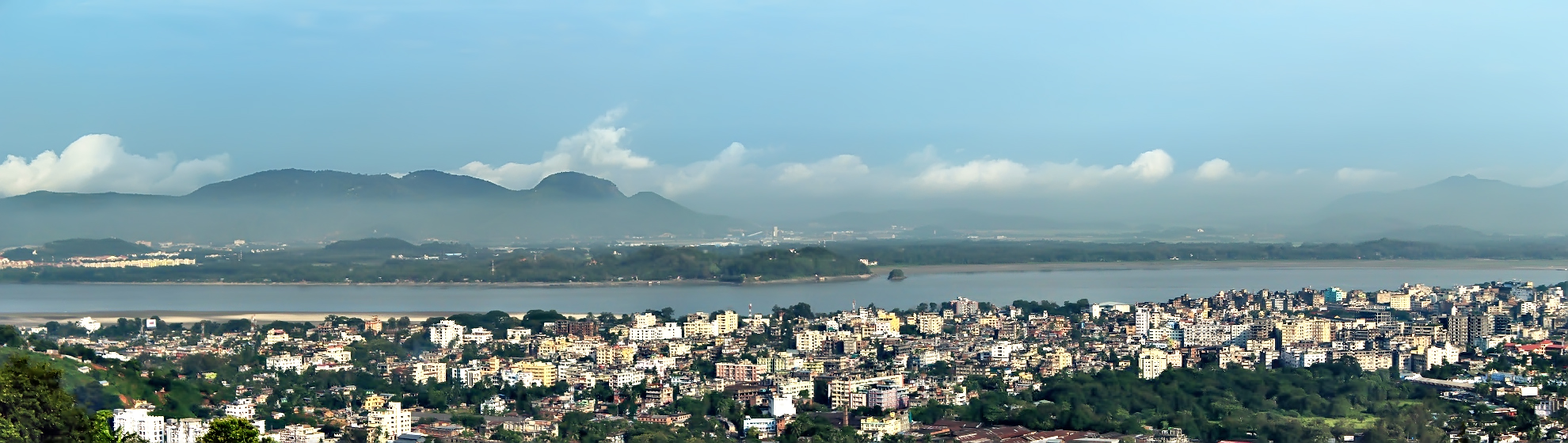
Panoramic view of Guwahati City.

=== Imphal ===
Imphal is capital of Manipur state. Some of the places of attractions in city as follows.

- Kangla Palace: Kangla Palace is on both sides (western and eastern) of the bank of the Imphal River. It was the traditional seat of the past Meitei rulers of Manipur.
- Hiyangthang Lairembi Temple Complex: A religious site and a tourist attraction, the temple complex is noted for its annual Durga Puja festival in September or October.
- Imphal War Cemetery: This cemetery remembers British and Indian soldiers who fought and died in the Second World War (1944).
- Ima Keithel (Women's Market): The market stalls are all run by women, and it is reportedly the only such market in the world.
- Jama Masjid: A holy place for Muslims in Imphal, it is the only mosque in the Imphal market (on the bank of the Nambul River).
- Shri Govindajee Temple: The temple was considered the apex of cultural activity during the reign of the Maharajas. Near the palace, it has two domes and a raised congregation hall.
- ISKCON Temple: The ISKCON Temple is near the road from Imphal Airport to the city. The temple houses numerous Hindu deities of the incarnations of Vishnu.
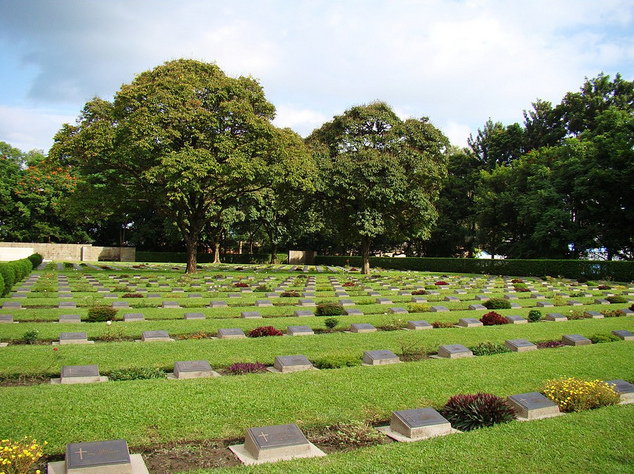
Imphal War Cemetery

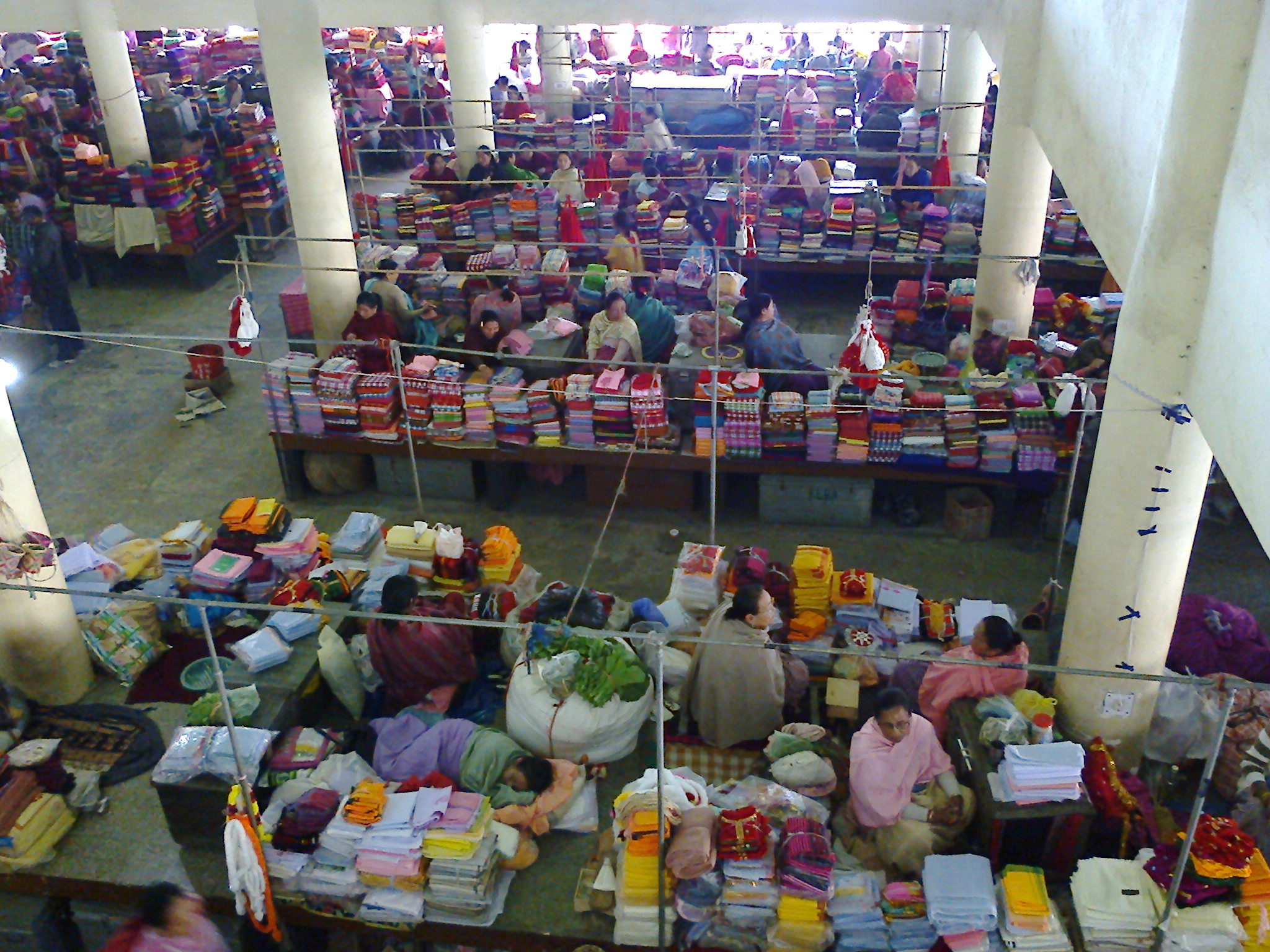
Women's Market (Ima Keithel)

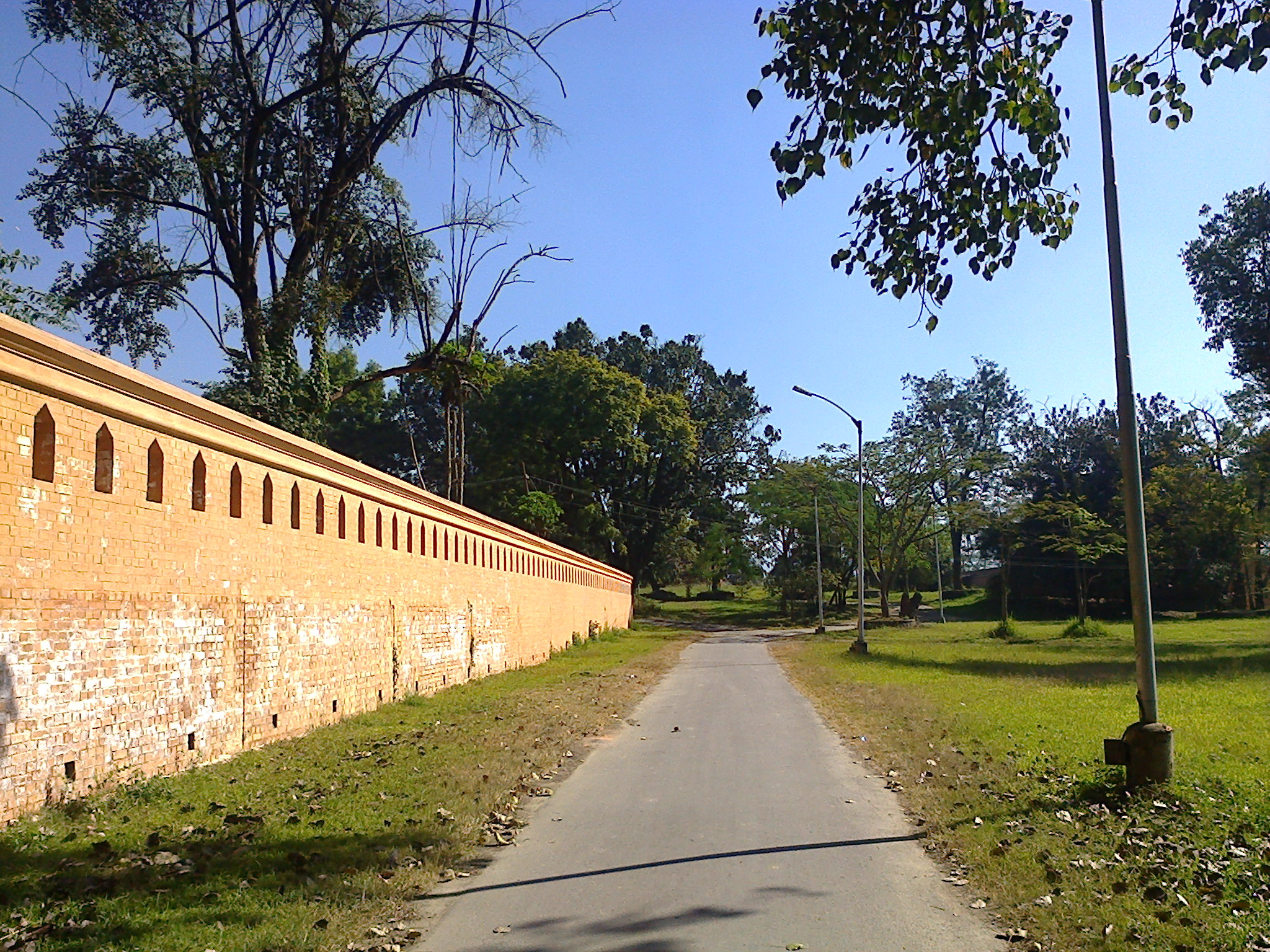
Ruins of Kangla Fort, Imphal.

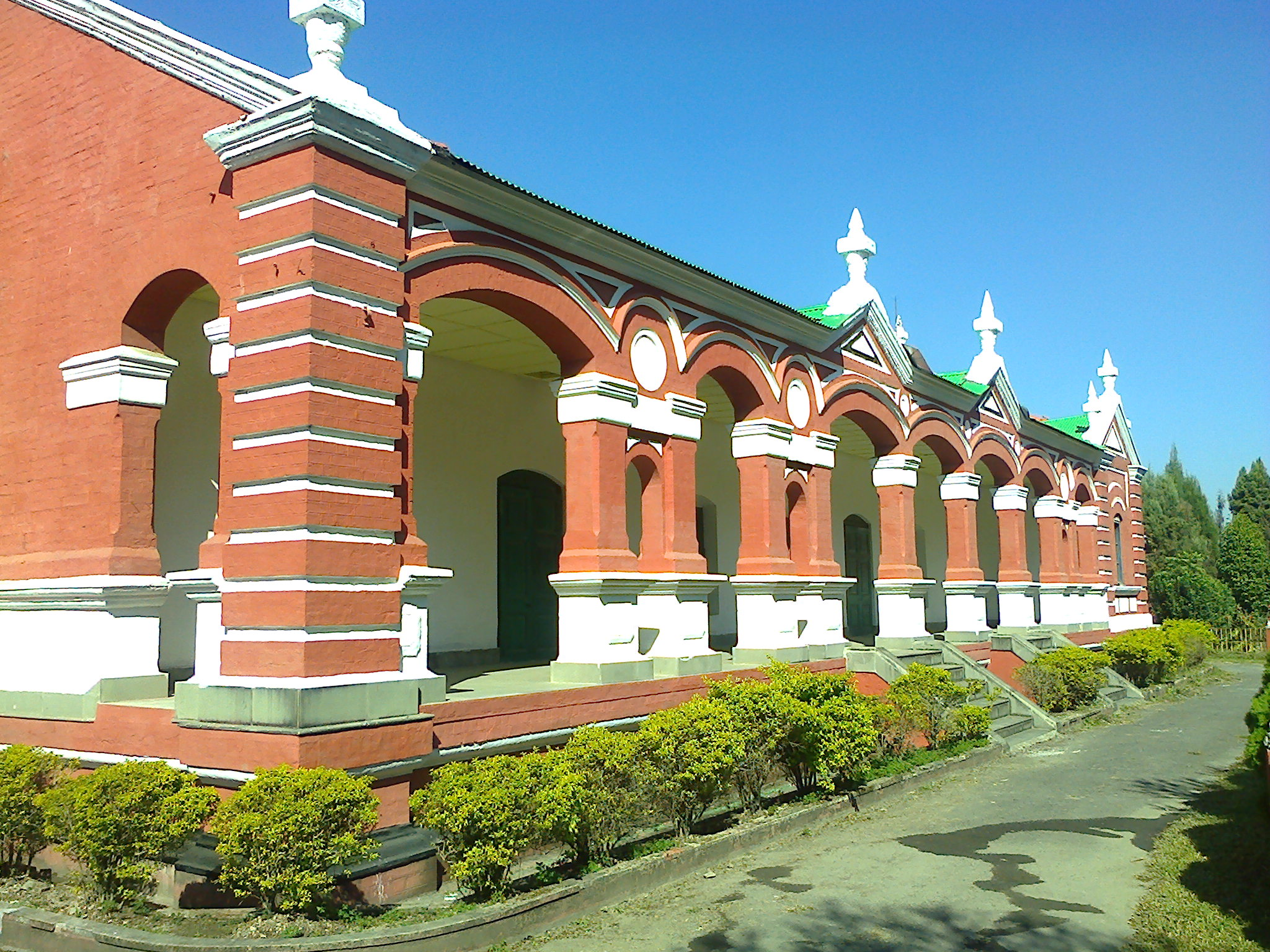
Kangla Museum houses, Imphal.

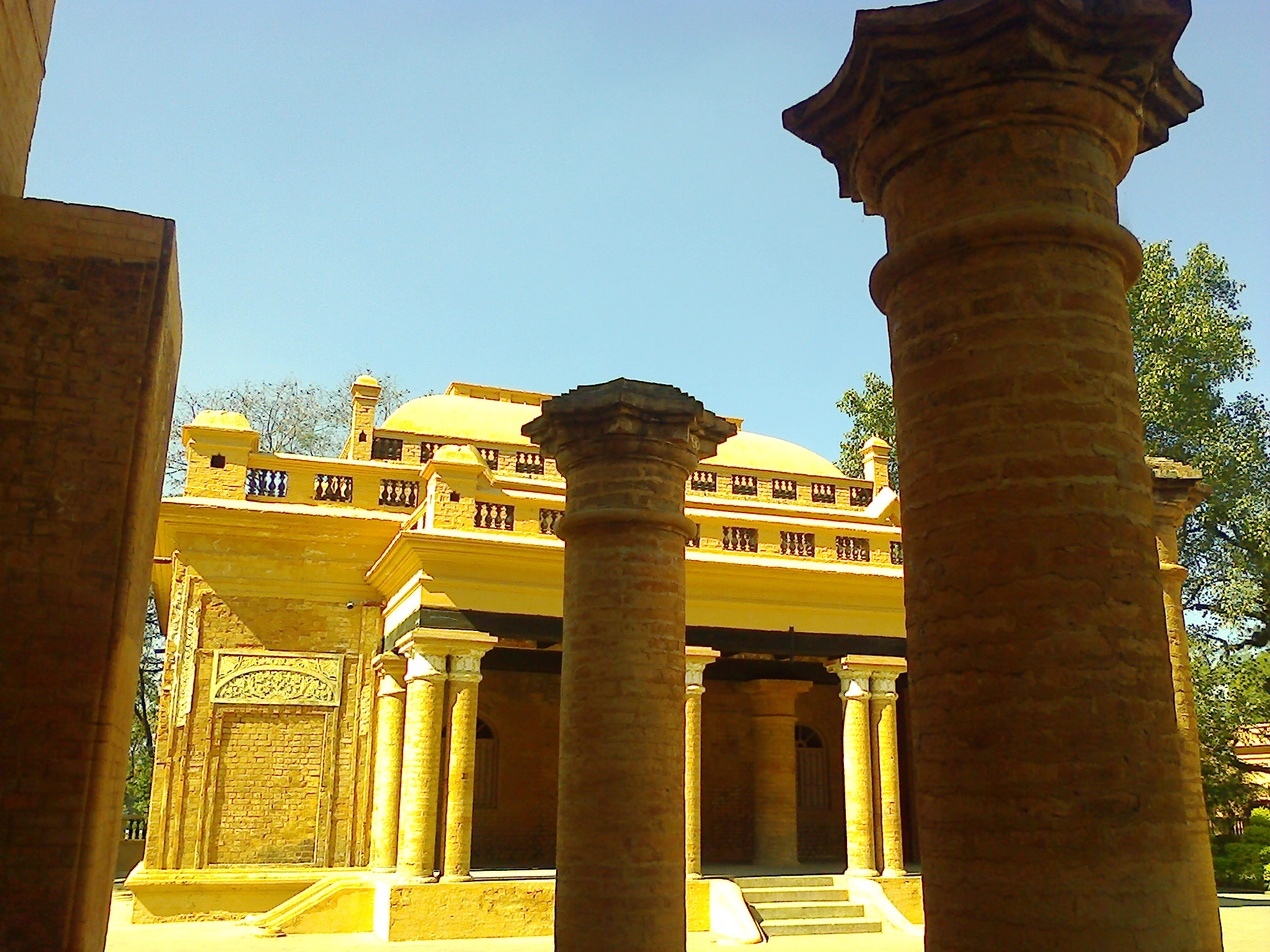
Shri Govindajee Temple, Imphal.

=== Itanagar ===
Itanagar is the capital of Arunachal Pradesh. Major tourist sites include:

- Ita Fort: Ita Fort in Itanagar town is a historical site in the state of Arunachal Pradesh, India. The name literally means "Fort of bricks" (brick being called "ita" in the Ahom language).
- Jawaharlal Nehru Museum, Itanagar: Known for showcasing tribal culture of the state.
- Ganga Lake is a natural lake locally known as Gekar Sinyi (Confined water in the Nyishi dialect) surrounded by a landmass of hard rock. Primeval vegetation, orchids masses on tall trees and tree ferns contribute to its popularity as a picnic spot. Boating facilities and a swimming pool are available at the site.
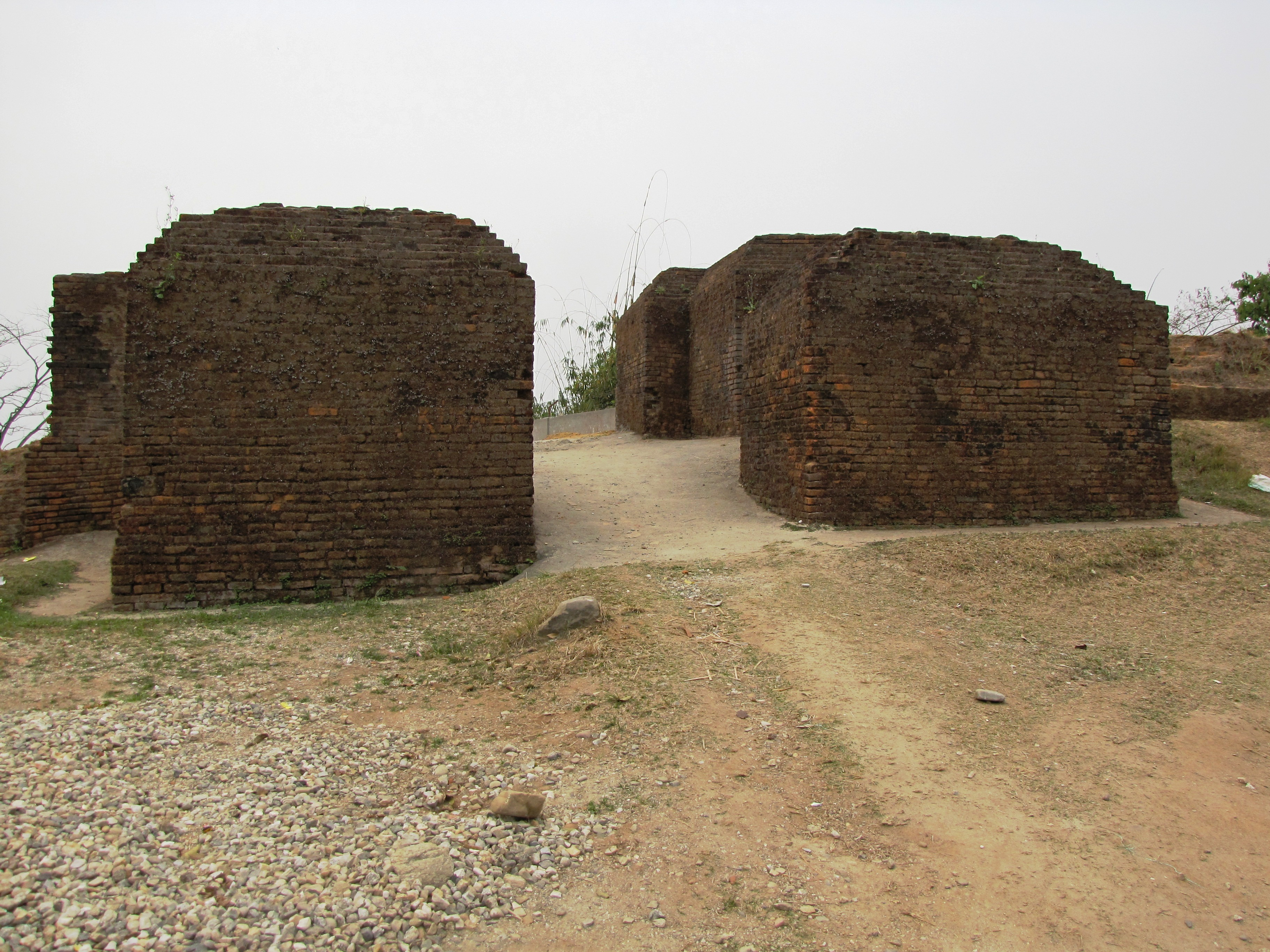
Ita Fort, southern gate, Itanagar.

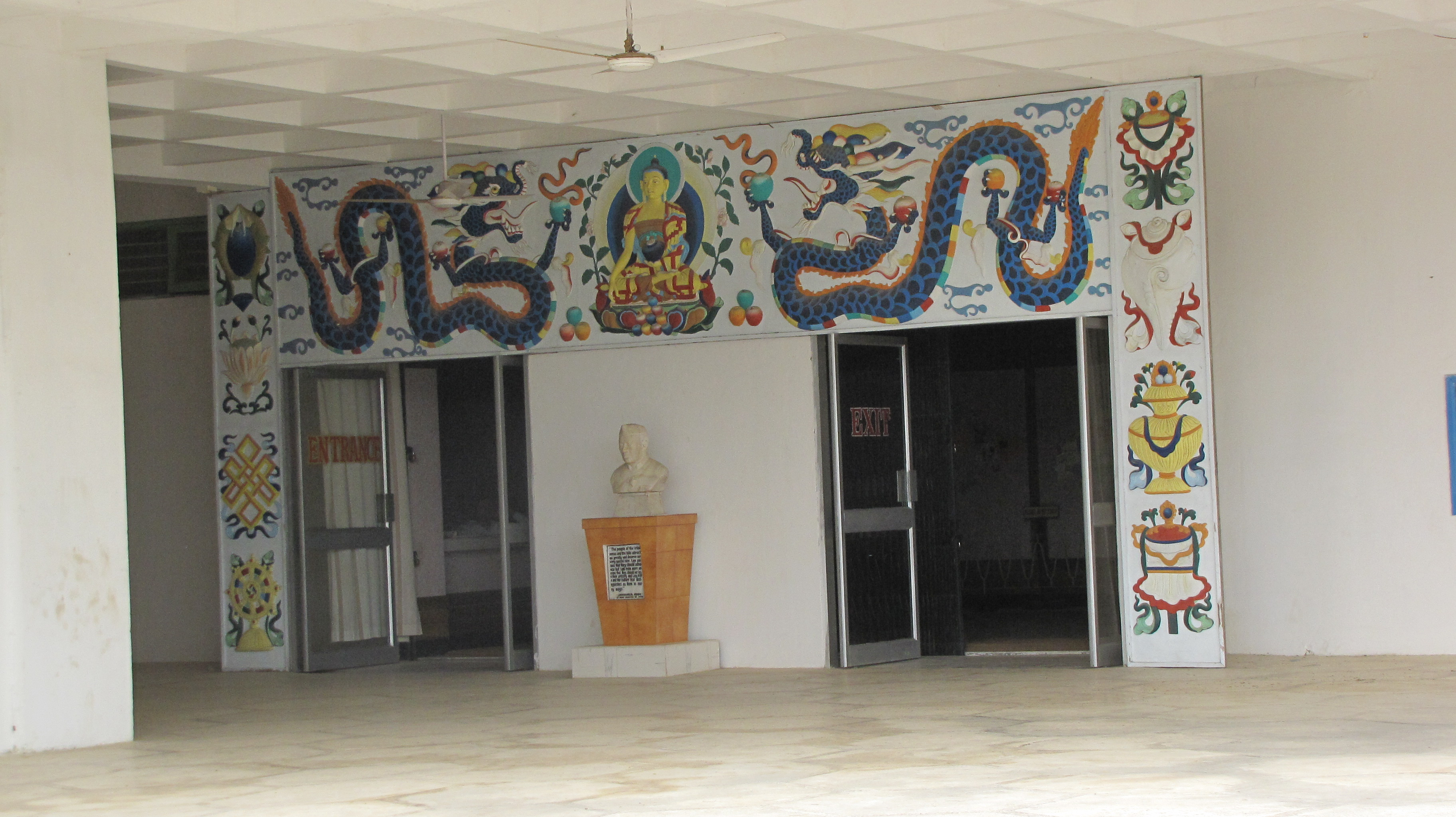
Entrance of Jawaharlal Nehru Museum, Itanagar.

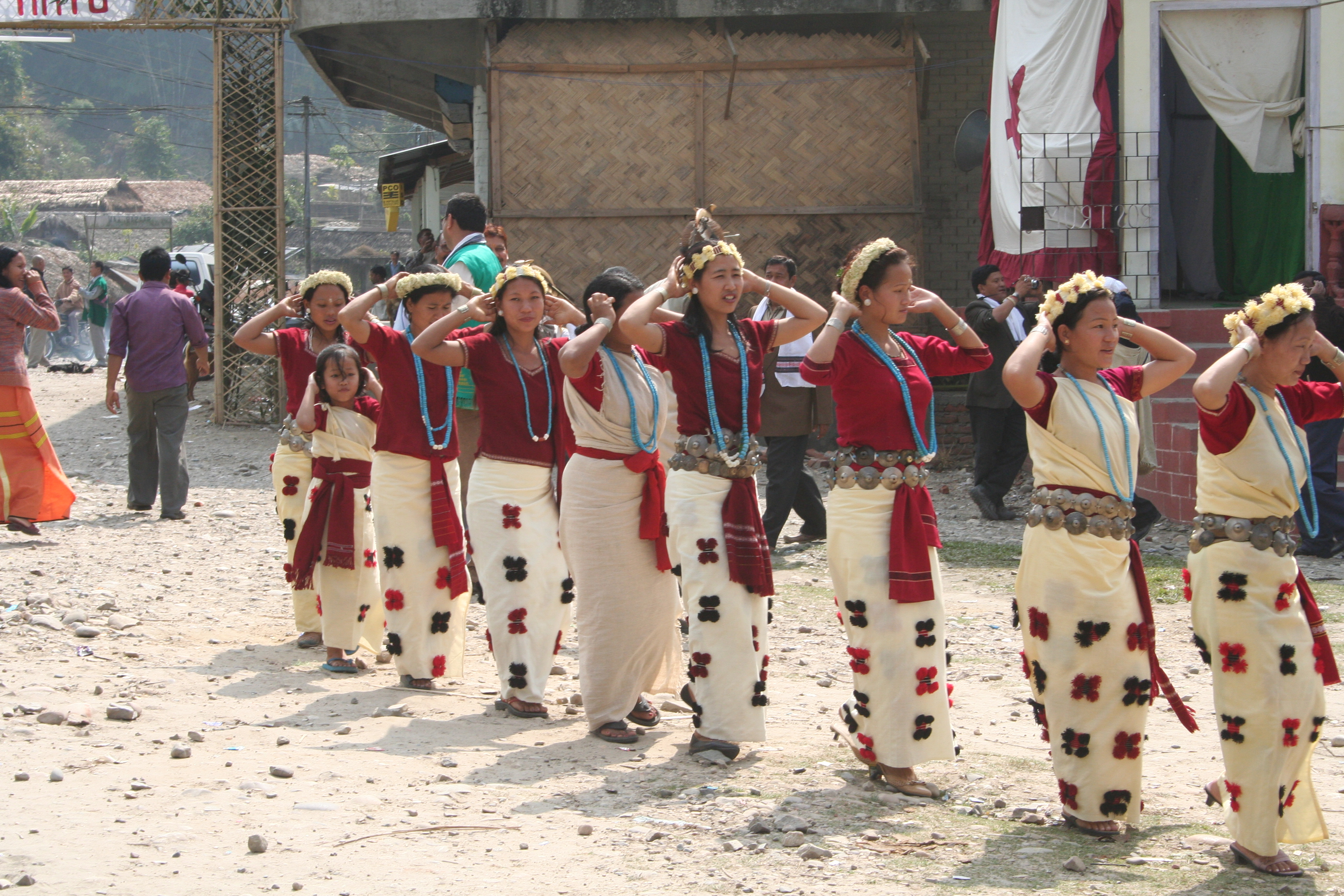
A festival of the Nyishi tribe of Arunachal Pradesh.

=== Kohima ===
Kohima is the capital of Nagaland. The city is known for its Hornbill Festival. Major tourist sites include:

- War Cemetery is a memorial dedicated to the soldiers of the 2nd British Division of the Allied Forces who died in the Second World War at Kohima, in April 1944.
- Naga Heritage Village is a vista of nature, cheerful and hospitality of people. The Heritage Village protects and preserves all ethnic cultural heritages of Nagaland. It upholds and sustains the unique identity of dialects, customs and traditions of all the ethnological tribes of Nagaland.
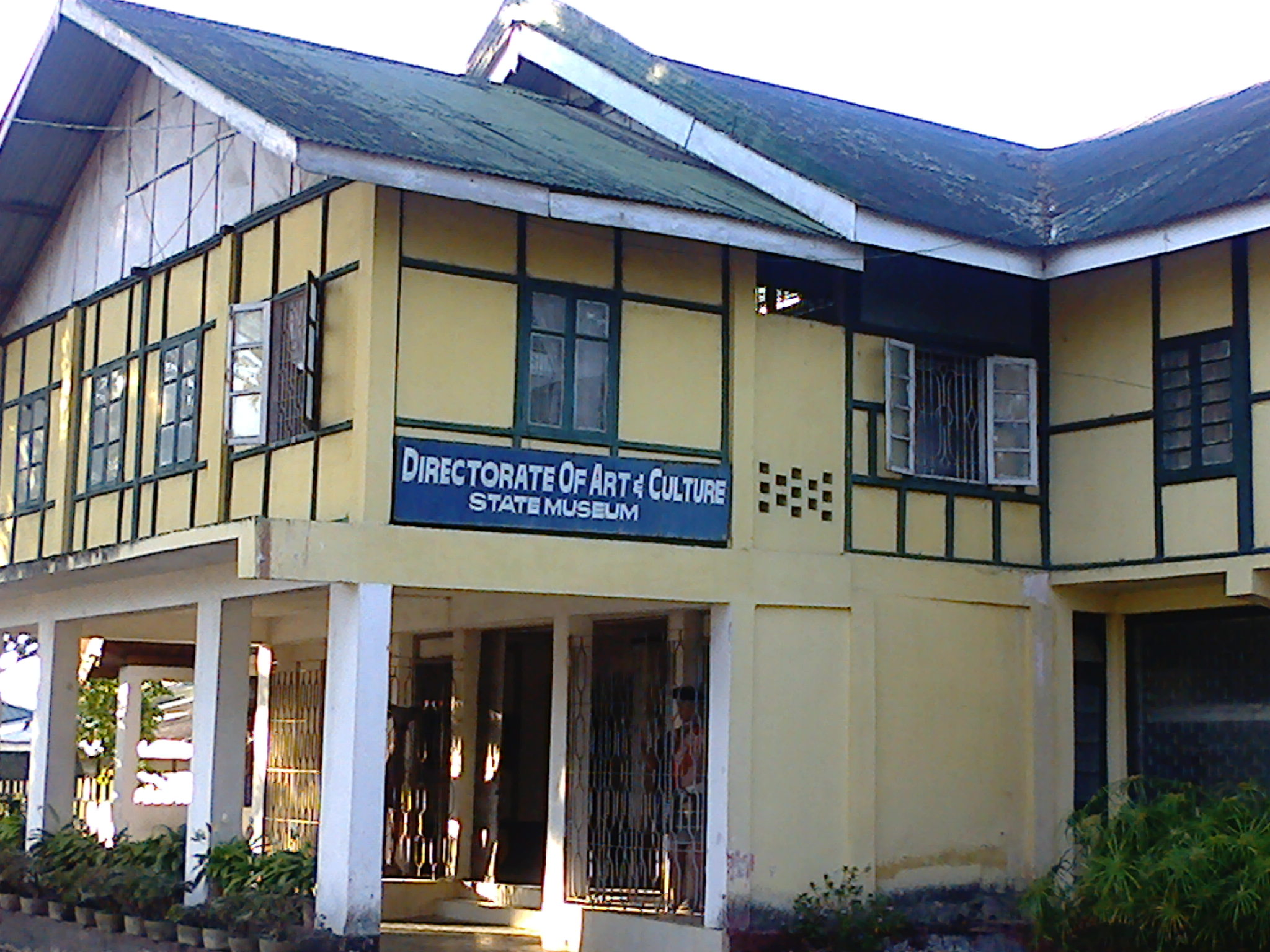
Kohima State Museum

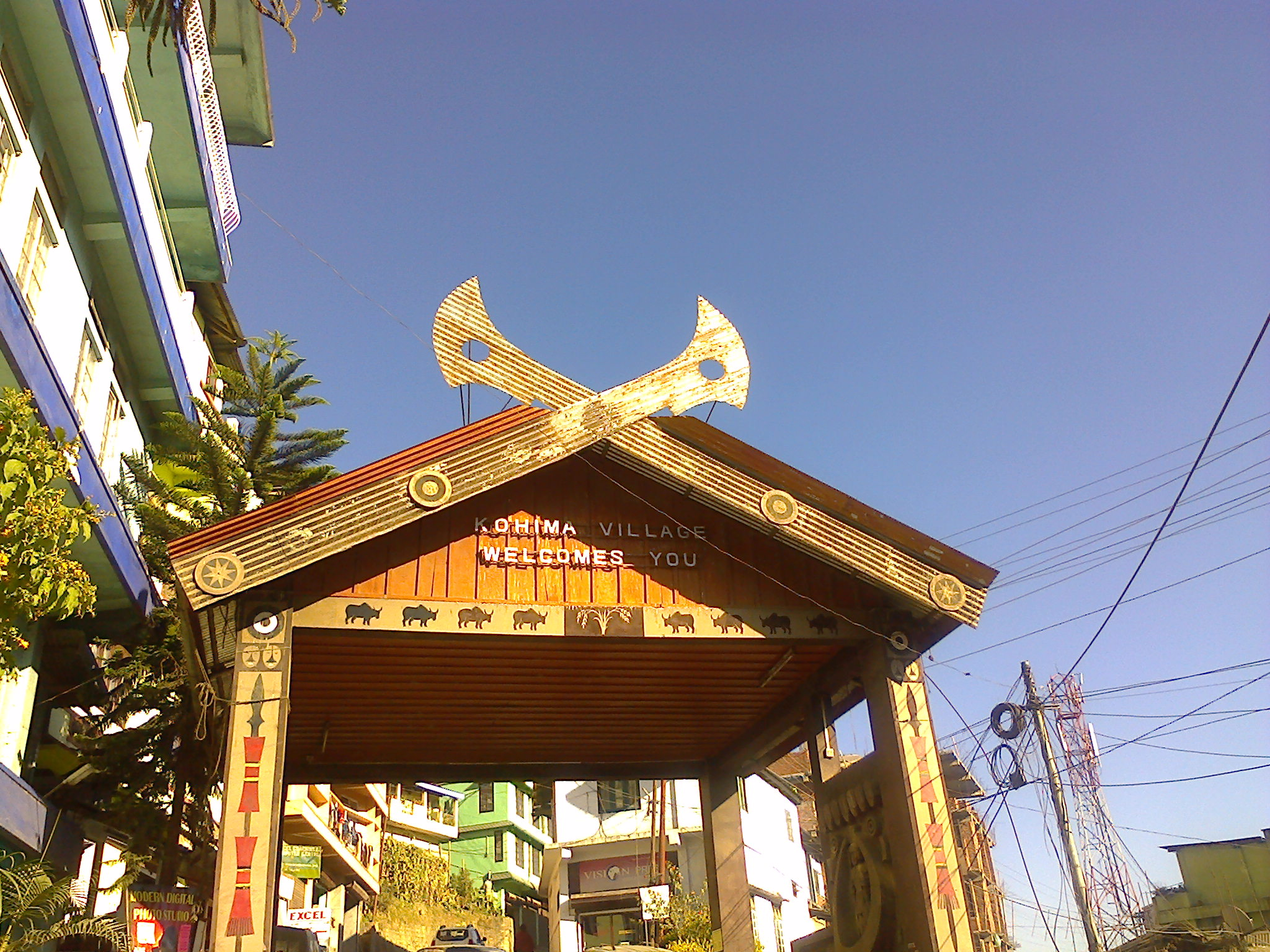
Welcome to Kohima Village

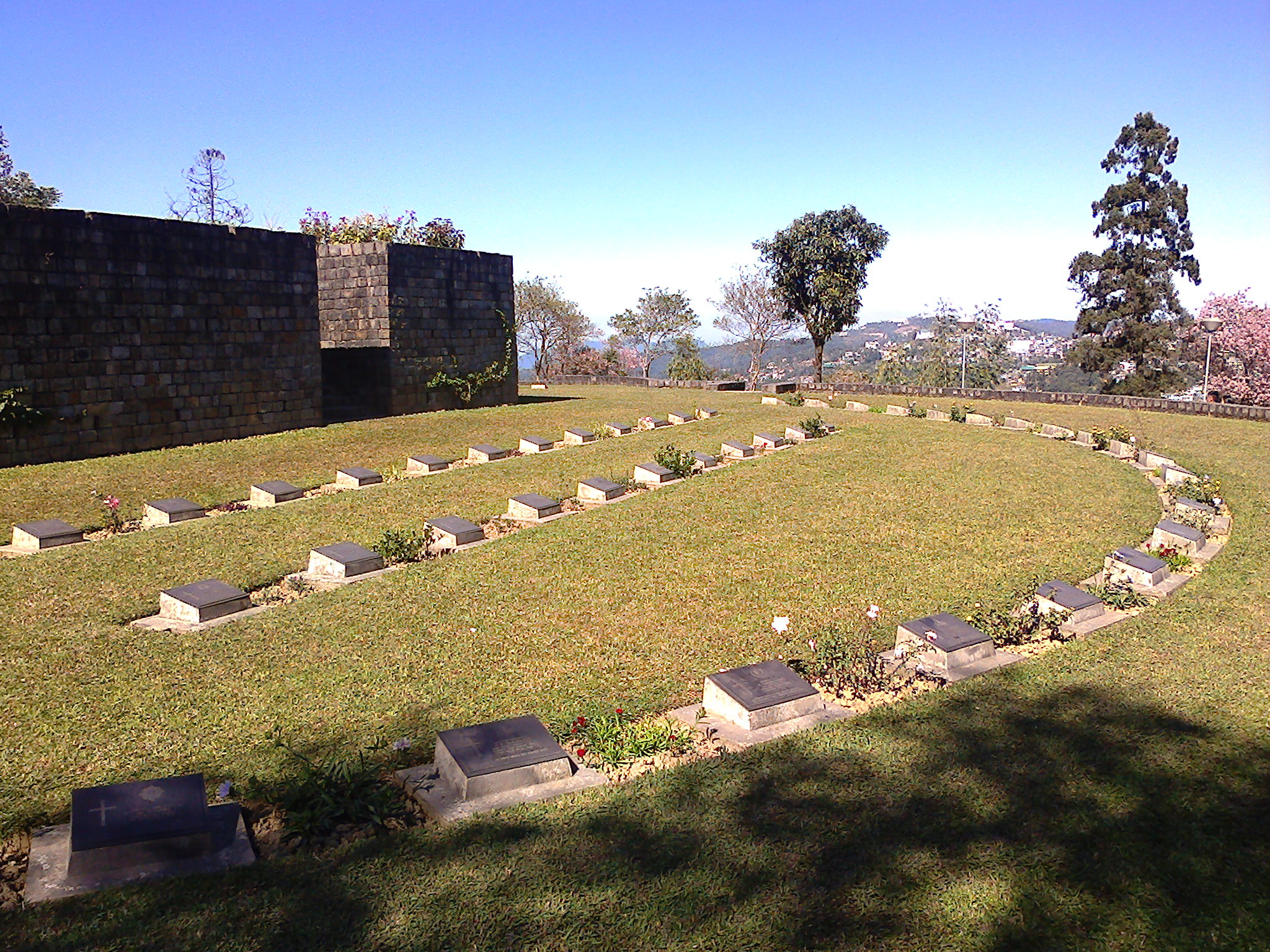
War Cemetery with Kohima City in background

=== Shillong ===
Shillong is the capital of Meghalaya.
Places of interest in and around Shillong includes:

- Elephant Falls: 12 km on the outskirts of the city, the mountain stream descends through two successive falls set in dells of fern covered rocks.
- Lady Hydari Park: The park stretches over a kilometre and has an adjacent mini zoo.
- Ward's Lake: Known locally as Nan-Polok, it is an artificial lake with garden and boating facilities.
- Shillong Golf Course: Shillong has one of the largest golf courses (the world's wettest) in Asia: Gleneagles of the East. It enjoys the rare distinction of being one of the few natural golf courses in Asia. Not only is the Shillong Golf Course scenic and enjoyable, it is also challenging. A group of British civil service officers introduced golf to Shillong in 1898 by constructing a nine-hole course. The present 18-hole course was inaugurated in 1924. The course is set in a valley covered with pine and rhododendron trees. The tight fairways, carpeted with a local grass which hardens the soil, are difficult to negotiate. The number of out-of-bounds streams that criss-cross every fairway makes it all the more trying. Obstructions come in the form of bunkers, trees and rain. The longest hole is the 6th, which is a grueling 594 yards. Shillong Golf Course is considered to be the "Glen Eagle of the East" at the United States Golf Association Museum. It was set in a valley at an altitude of 5200 ft in 1898 as a nine-hole course and later converted into an 18-hole course in 1924 by Captain Jackson and C. K. Rhodes.
- Motphran: The "Stone of France" which is locally known as "Motphran" was erected in memory of the 26th Khasi Labour Corps who served under the British in France during World War I. It bears the words of the famous Latin poet Horace "Dulce et decorum est pro patria mori" which can be roughly translated as "It is sweet and fitting to die for one's country."
- Shillong Peak: A picnic spot, 10 km from the city, 1965 m above sea level, offers a panoramic view of the scenic countryside and is the highest point in the state. Obeisance is paid to U Shulong at the sanctum sanctorum at the peak's summit every springtime, by the religious priest of Mylliem State.
- Capt. Williamson Sangma State Museum: For those interested in ethnic tribal culture and tradition this government museum offers insights to the lifestyle of the people. This museum is in the State Central Library complex where monuments for the great patriots of the state were erected beside the statue of Smt. Indira Gandhi and Netaji Subhash Chandra Bose.
- Don Bosco Centre for Indigenous Cultures: The Don Bosco Museum is part of DBCIC (Don Bosco Centre for Indigenous Cultures). DBCIC comprises research on cultures, publications, training, animation programmes and the museum, which is a place of knowledge-sharing on the cultures of the northeast in particular, and of culture in general. DBCIC with its Don Bosco Museum is at Mawlai, Shillong.
- Entomological Museum (Butterfly Museum): A privately owned museum of M/s Wankhar, Riatsamthiah, Shillong about 2 km from Police Bazar is the only known museum in India devoted to moths and butterflies.
- Air Force Museum at Upper Shillong
- Forest Museum in Lady Hydari Park
- Rhino Heritage Museum at Shillong
- Zoological Museum in Risa Colony
- Anthropological museum at Mawblei
- Botanical Museum at 4th Furlong
- Arunachal Museum at the Cantonment Area
- Chrysalis the Gallery: This art gallery is on the second floor of Salonsar Mansion at Police Bazaar, the commercial hub of Shillong. Chrysalis has flexible spacing to display paintings (canvases), sculpture, photography and handicrafts. Run by a local artist, Jaya Kalra, the gallery caters to exhibitions of artists and artisans especially from the northeast and also from the rest of India.
- State Museum: Located at the State Central Library complex.
- Cathedral of Mary Help of Christians is in Don Bosco Square.
- Bishop and Beadon Falls: Both cascade down the same escarpment into a deep valley.
- Spread Eagle Falls: 3 km from Polo Grounds.
- Sweet Falls: Sweet Falls (also called "Weitden," in the native dialect) is a waterfall in Shillong. It lies about 5 km from the Happy Valley and is about 96 m in height.
- Crinoline Falls: Near Lady Hydari Park.
- Madina Masjid: The only glass mosque in India. Madina mosque is the rare architectural marvel in India as it has a striking and glittering structure of glass.
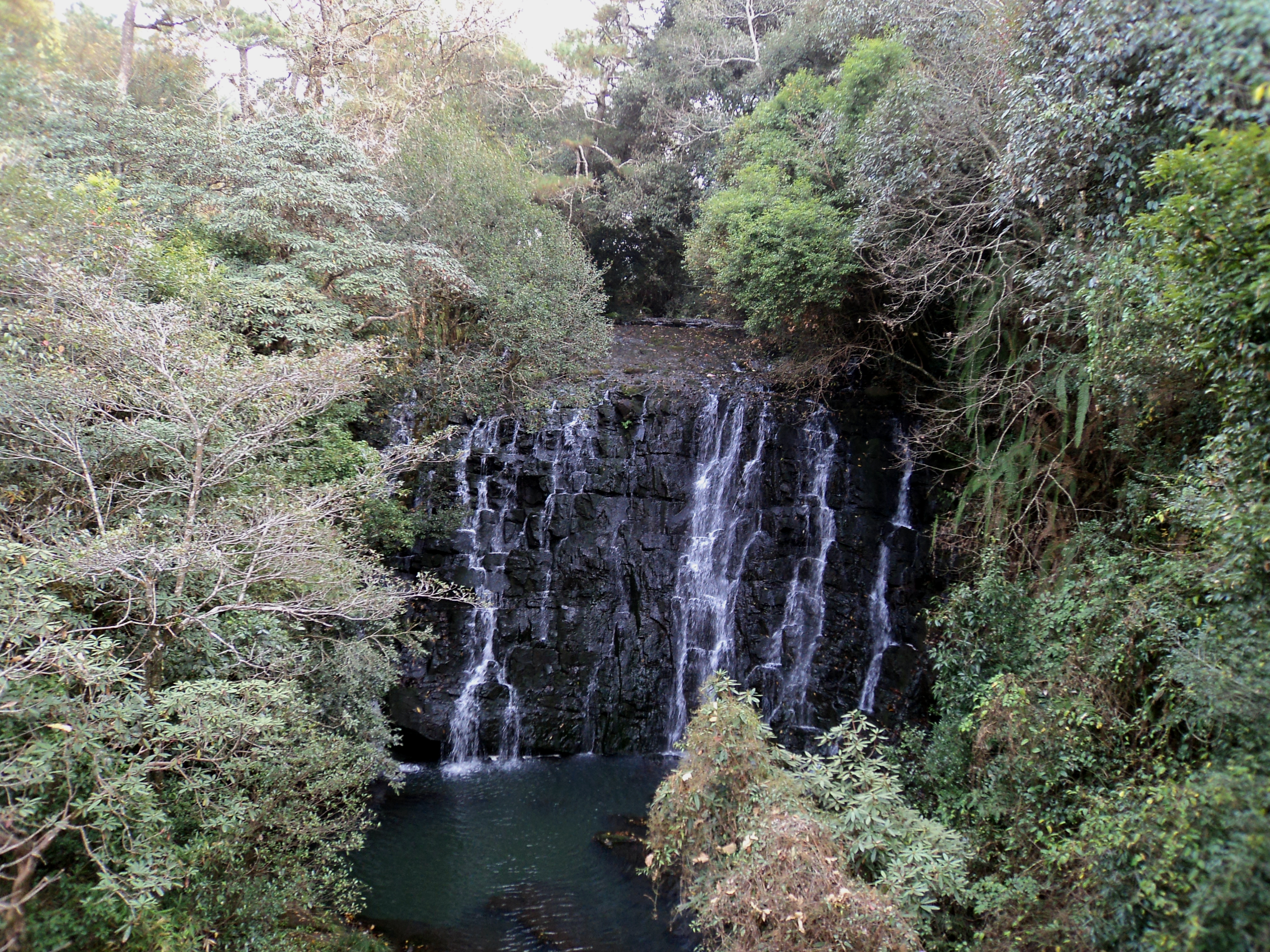
Elephant Falls, Shillong.

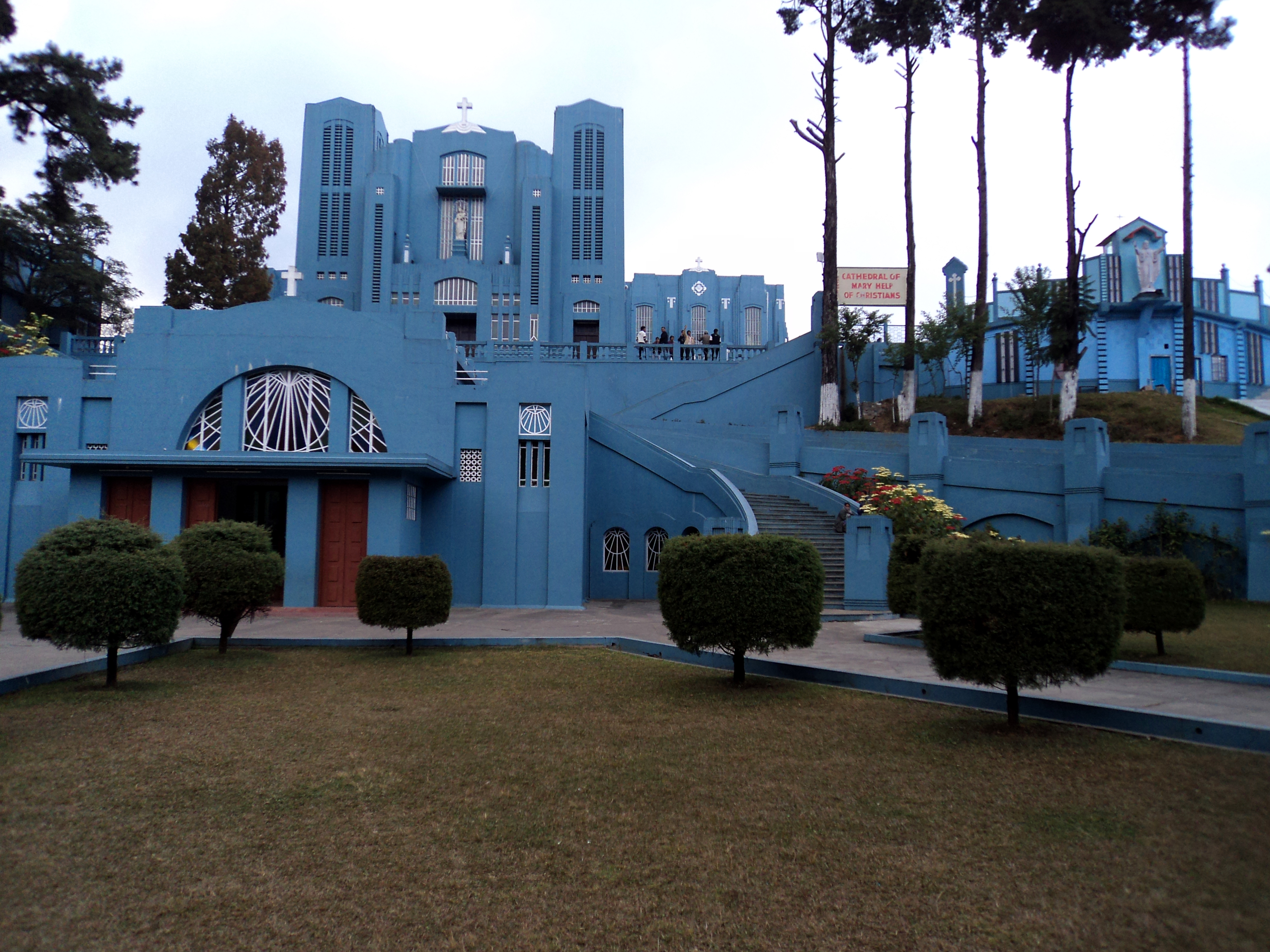
Cathedral of Mary Help of Christians, Shillong.

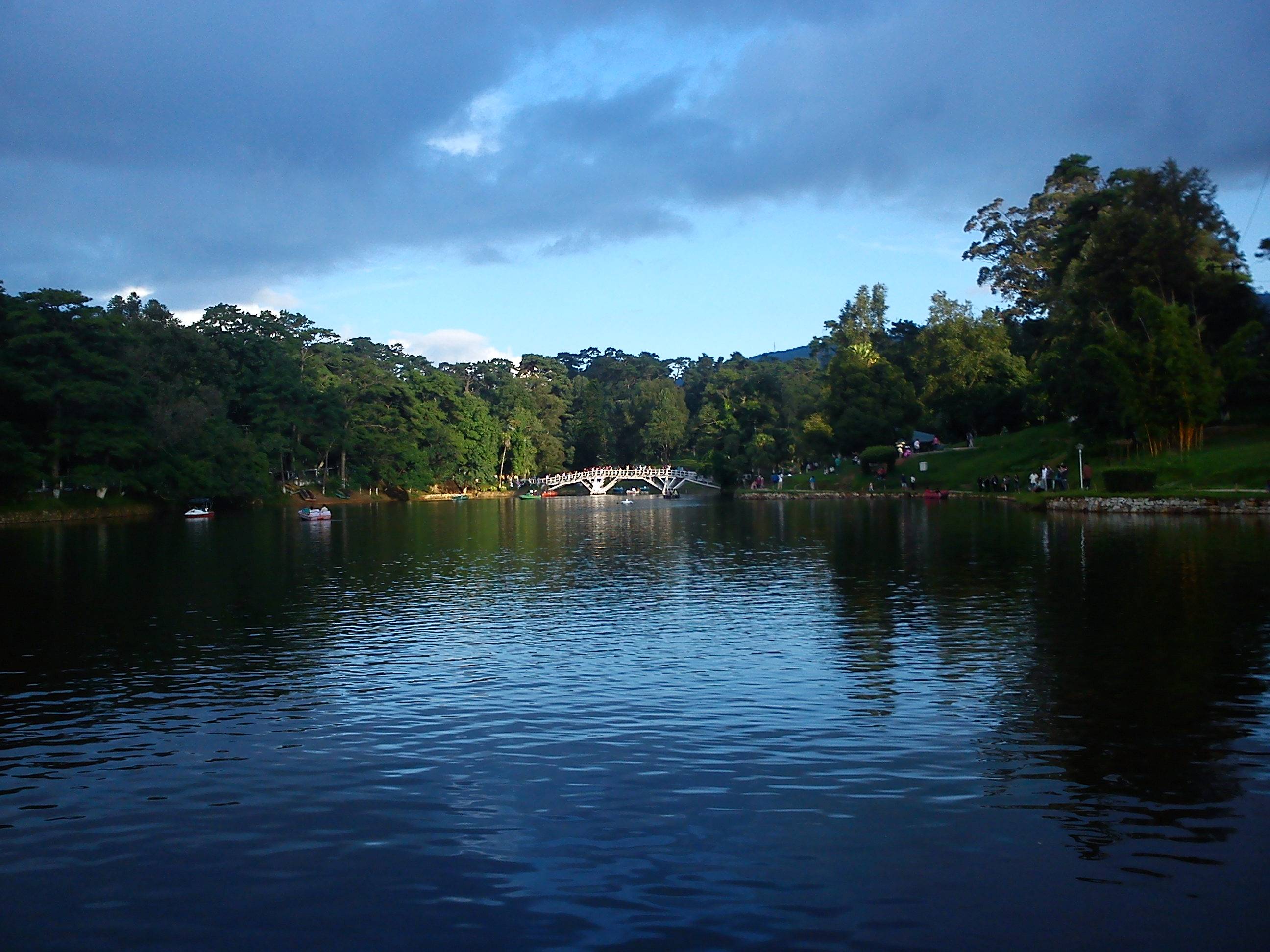
Ward's Lake, Shillong.

== See also ==
- Tourism in India
- Tourist attractions in Manipur
- Tourism in Assam
- Tourism in Mizoram
- Outline of tourism in India

== Official websites ==
- Ministry of Development of North Eastern Region
- Northeast India Tourism
- About Crafts of Northeast India

Tourism in Northeast India travel guide from Wikivoyage
