= List of waterfalls in India =

The following is a list of waterfalls in India sorted by state. The Indian state of Karnataka has more waterfalls than any other state. Karnataka has 544 waterfalls which are at least 10 meters in height. With a height of 455 meters, Kunchikal Falls in Shimoga District, Karnataka, is the tallest waterfall in the country.

== Andhra Pradesh ==
| Name | District | Height | Photo | Details |
|---|---|---|---|---|
| Kailasakona Falls | Chittoor | | | This perennial waterfall located in the Nagari valley near Tirupati in Chittoor district originates from a fracture in a sheet rock. |
| Nemaligundla Falls | Prakasam | | | Near Giddalur town in Nallamala Forest |
| Ethipothala Falls | Guntur | | | Situated on Ethipothala river, a tributary of river Krishna, and is located in Thallapalle village of Macherla mandal, Guntur district, Andhra Pradesh |
| Kapila Theertham | Chittoor | | | Near holy town Tirumala |
| Talakona | Chittoor | | | Highest waterfall in Andhra Pradesh State |
| Ubbalamdugu Falls | Chittoor | | | Also called Tada Falls or Kambakam Falls |
| Katiki Waterfalls | Visakhapatnam | | | Near Araku, Visakhapatnam District |
| Thatiguda Falls | | | | |
| Bhairava Kona | Prakasam | | | Near Pamur town in Nallamala Forest |
| Champawati | Prakasam | | | |
| Shiav Kunda | Prakasam | | | |
| Basistha | | | | |
| Penchalakona Water Falls | Nellore | | | Located around 115 km (71 mi) from Tirupati |
| Kalyan Revu Water Falls | Chittoor | | | Located around 10 km (6.2 mi) from Palamaner |
| Kigal Water Falls | Chittoor | | | Located around 28 km (17 mi) from Palamaner |
| Ganganna Sirasu Water Falls | Chittoor | | | Located around 10 km (6.2 mi) from Palamaner |

== Arunachal Pradesh ==
| Name | District | Height | Photo | Details |
|---|---|---|---|---|
| Nuranang Falls | Tawang | 100 m | | Also called the Bong Bong Falls, located around 40 km from Tawang. |
| Bap Teng Kang Waterfall | Tawang | 30 m | | Also called the BTK Fountain, located about 82 km from Tawang. |
| Chumi Gyatse Falls | Tawang | | | Located 250 metres from the Chinese controlled side of the Line of Actual Control. It is a collection of 108 waterfalls. |
| Jung Fall | Tawang | | | Located 35 km from Tawang and 5 km from Jung. |

== Assam ==
| Name | District | Height | Photo | Details |
|---|---|---|---|---|
| Akashiganga Waterfalls | Hojai | | | 50 km south-east of Nagaon and 26 km from Hojai, near Doboka. |
| Chapanala | Nagaon | | | Also known as Champawati Kunda. 28 km east of Nagaon. |
| Kakochang | Karbi Anglong | | | Located at a distance of 13 km from Bokakhat, near Kaziranga. |
| Sivakunda | Morigaon | | | Situated in the Amsoi hills. |
| Dikrut (Paklongkam) | East Karbi Anglong | | | |
| Kangthilangso Waterfall | East Karbi Anglong | | | Located in Kanthi village, around 12 km from Denarong (Dengaon) along NH 36. |
| Bheloghat (Paklangso) | East Karbi Anglong | | | |
| Panimur and Koka fall | Dima Hasao District and West Karbi Anglong district | | | |
| Bendao Baiglai | Dima Hasao | | | Sampardisa village near Haflong |
| Tegheria | East Kamrup | | | |

== Bihar ==
| Name | District | Height | Photo | Details |
|---|---|---|---|---|
| Kakolat Falls | Nawada | 160 ft | | Located 4 km from Thali Bazar |
| North Tank | Jamalpur | | | |
| Madhuvdhandam | | | | |
| Dhua Kund Falls | Rohtas | | | |
| Telhar Kund | Bhabhua | | | |
| Manjhar Kund | Rohtas | | | |
| Karkat Waterfall | Kaimur | | | It is located in Karkatgarh Village, Kaimur Range. It was a renowned crocodile-hunting place for Mughals and British officials. The Government of Bihar is developing it as a crocodile conservation reserve to promote eco-tourism. |

== Chhattisgarh ==
| Name | District | Height | Photo | Details |
|---|---|---|---|---|
| Chitrakoot Falls | Jagdalpur | 100 ft (30 m) | | |
| Amritdhara falls | Manedragarh | 50 ft (15 m) | | |
| Teerathgarh Falls | | 300 ft (91 m) | | |
| Tree Falls | | 300 ft (91 m) | | |

== Goa ==
| Name | District | Height | Photo | Details |
|---|---|---|---|---|
| Arvalem Falls | North Goa | | | |
| Dudhsagar Falls | South Goa | 310 m (1,020 ft) | | |
| Kuske falls | South Goa | | | |
| Kesarval Falls | South Goa | | | |
| Tamdi Surla Falls | South Goa | | | |

== Gujarat ==
| Name | District | Height | Photo | Details |
|---|---|---|---|---|
| Juna Ghata Falls | Narmada, Narmada district | | | |
| Gira falls | | | | near Saputara |
| Gira dhodh Falls | Dang | | | near Waghai |
| Hathni waterfall | Panchmahal | 100 meter | | near Jambughoda wildlife sanctuary |
| Jamjir Falls | Junagadh | 12 meter | | near Gir Forest National Park |
| Machhu Falls | | | | |
| Ninai Falls | Narmada, Dediyapada Taluka, Narmada district | | | |
| Zanzari Falls | Sabarkantha, Dabha, Sabarkantha | | | |
| Zarwani Falls | Narmada | | | near Kevadiya, Narmada district |
| Girmal Falls | Dang, Girmal, Dang District | | | |
| Jatashankar Falls | Junagadh, Girnar, Junagadh District | | | |
| Kokam Falls | Dediapada, Narmada District | | | |

== Himachal Pradesh ==
| Name | District | Height | Photo | Details |
|---|---|---|---|---|
| Badri Falls | | | | |
| Bhagsu Falls | | | | Mcleod Gunj area |
| Jogini Falls | | | | 4 km from Vashisht Temple and 7.5 km from Manali Bus Stand.Location in Manali. |
| Bundla Falls | | 328 ft (100 m) | | |
| Chadwick Falls | | | | Shimla region |
| Machhrial Falls | | | | |
| Palani Falls | | 492 ft (150 m) | | |
| Rahla Falls | Leh Manali Highway | | | |
| Sissu Falls | Leh Manali Highway | | | |
| Jibhi Waterfall | Jibhi, Tandi | | | |

== Jammu and Kashmir ==
Aharbal Falls This lake is situated in the Kulgam district of Jammu and Kashmir.It is also known as "Niagara of Kashmir".Aharbal fall is on river 'Vishav', that originates from 'Kousar Nag' lake.(Raeeq Abdullah)

== Jharkhand ==
| Name | District | Height | Photo | Details |
|---|---|---|---|---|
| Chiller Arpid Falls | | | | |
| Dassam Falls | Ranchi | 144 ft (44 m) | | on Kanchi river, a tributary of Subarnarekha river |
| Dharagiri Falls | | | | |
| Gua Falls | | | | |
| Halpad Falls | | | | |
| Hirni Falls | West Singhbhum | | | |
| Hundru Falls | Ranchi | 320 ft (98 m) | | on Subarnarekha river |
| Jadni Falls | | | | |
| Jonha Falls | | | | also called Gautamdhara |
| Kelaghagh Falls | | | | |
| Keridah Falls | | | | |
| Lodh Falls | | 468 ft (143 m) | | also called Burhaghagh Falls |
| Lower Ghaghri Falls | | 320 ft (98 m) | | |
| Maludah Falls | | | | |
| Mirchaiya Falls | | | | |
| Moti Jharna Falls | | | | |
| Panchghagh Falls | Khunti | | | |
| Perwa ghagh Falls | | | | |
| Rajrappa | Ramgarh | | | |
| Sadni Falls | | 200 ft (61 m) | | |
| Sita Falls | | | | |
| Sugabandh Falls | | | | |
| Upper Ghaghri Falls | | | | |
| Usri Falls | | | | |
| Vrindaha Falls | Koderma | 40 ft (12 m) | Vrindaha Falls in Koderma, Jharkhand, India. | The Vrindaha Waterfalls are set against a beautiful natural background. You can hear the sound of water rushing between two hills and crashing onto the rocks from far away. The area is surrounded by thick forests, making it even more scenic. The waterfall drops from about 40 feet high. Many people like to swim here, but some spots have deep water. |

== Karnataka ==
| Name | District | Height | Photo | Details |
|---|---|---|---|---|
| Jhari Falls | Chikmagalur | 165–230 ft (50–70 m) | | 22 km (14 mi) from Chikmagalur |
| Gaganachukki and Bharachukki Falls | Chamarajanagar | - | | River Cauvery, 100 km (62 mi) from Bangalore |
| Apsarakonda Falls | Uttara Kannada | - | | River Sharavati, 8 km (5.0 mi) from Honnavar |
| Lalguli Falls | Uttara Kannada | 250 ft (76 m) | | River Kali, 13 km (8.1 mi) from Yellapur |
| Nisargadhama Falls | Madikeri | | | River Cauvery 2 km (1.2 mi) from Kushalnagar |
| Burude Falls or Dodmane Falls | Uttara Kannada | | | 20 km (12 mi)+ from Siddapura and 55 km (34 mi)+ from Sirsi on Siddapur-Kumta road |
| Shivagange Falls | Uttara Kannada | 243 ft (74 m) | | River Sonda, 45 km (28 mi) from Sirsi |
| Belkal theertha | Shimoga & Udupi | 600 ft (180 m) | | During rainy season, 110 km (68 mi) from Shimoga |
| Dabbe Falls | Sagar, Karnataka | | | near Hosagadde, 20 km (12 mi) from Kargal |
| Waate haLLa Falls | Uttara Kannada | 100 ft (30 m)+ | | 30 km (19 mi) from Sirsi |
| Vibhooti Falls | Uttara Kannada | | | 50 km (31 mi) from Sirsi on Yana-Ankola Road |
| Alekan Falls | Dakshina Kannada | | | 18 km (11 mi) from Charmadi |
| Dondole Falls | Dakshina Kannada | 50 ft (15 m)+ | | 23 km (14 mi) from Charmadi |
| Shanti Falls | Chikmagalur | 12 ft (3.7 m) | | near Kemmanagundi |
| Abbey Falls | Kodagu | | | 8 km (5.0 mi) from Madikeri |
| Arisina Gundi Falls | Udupi | | | near Kollur |
| Barkana Falls | Shimoga | 850 ft (260 m) | | River Sita, near Agumbe |
| Bennehole Falls | Uttara Kannada | 230 ft (70 m) | | On the way to Kumta from Sirsi |
| Chunchanakatte Falls | Mysore | 66 ft (20 m) | | River Cauvery, 15 km (9.3 mi) from Krishnarajanagara |
| Godchinamalaki Falls | Belgaum | 141 ft (43 m) | | River Markandeya, 16 km (9.9 mi) from Gokak |
| Gokak Falls | Belgaum | 170 ft (52 m) | | River Ghataprabha, 6 km (3.7 mi) from Gokak |
| Hebbe Falls | Chikmagalur | 551 ft (168 m) | | 10 km (6.2 mi) from Kemmanagundi |
| Irupu Falls | Kodagu | 170 ft (52 m) | | River Lakshmana Tirtha 48 km (30 mi) from Virajpet |
| Jomlu Theertha Falls | Udupi | 30 ft (9.1 m) | | Seethanadi, 35 km (22 mi) from Udupi |
| Chelavara Falls | Kodagu | | | 10 km (6.2 mi) from Palace Estate |
| Mallalli Falls | Kodagu | | | River Kumaradhara, 25 km (16 mi) from Somwarpet |
| Jog Falls or Gersoppa Falls | Sagara | 829 ft (253 m) | | River Sharavati, 30 km (19 mi) from Sagara |
| Mavinagundi Falls | Siddapur | | | River Mavinagundi, near Siddapura |
| Hidlumane Falls | Shivamogga | 100 ft (30 m) | | Kodachadri water stream, 105 km (65 mi) from Shivamogga |
| Kalhatti Falls | Chikmagalur | 403 ft (123 m) | | near Kemmanagundi |
| Unchalli Falls or Keppa Falls | Uttara Kannada | 380 ft (120 m) | | 35 km (22 mi) from Siddapura 45 km (28 mi) from Sirsi |
| Koosalli Falls | Udupi | 380 ft (120 m) | | 70 km (43 mi) from Udupi |
| Kudumari Falls or Belligundi Falls | Udupi | 300 ft (91 m) | | |
| Magod Falls | Uttara Kannada | 650 ft (200 m) | | River Bedti, 17 km (11 mi) from Yellapur |
| Manikyadhara Falls | Chikmagalur | | | 1 km (0.62 mi) from Baba Budangiri |
| Muthyala Maduvu Waterfall | Bangalore | | | 40 km (25 mi) from Bangalore, very small waterfall |
| Shivanasamudra Falls | Chamarajanagar | 320 ft (98 m) | | River Cauvery, 139 km (86 mi) from Bangalore |
| Sathodi Falls | Uttara Kannada | 49 ft (15 m) | | River Kali, 32 km (20 mi) from Yellapur |
| Varapoha Falls | Belgaum | 197 ft (60 m) | | River Mandovi, 60 km (37 mi) from Belgaum |
| Sirimane Falls | Chikmagalur | | | 22 km (14 mi) from Sringeri |
| Sogal Falls | Belgaum | | | near Bailhongal |
| Chunchi Falls | Bangalore | | | River Arkavathi, 90 km (56 mi) from Bangalore |
| Shimsha Falls or Ganalu Falls | Mandya | | | River Shimsha, 11.5 km (7.1 mi) from Halaguru on HN 209 |
| Suthanabbe Falls or Hanumanagundi Falls | Chikmagalur | 100 ft (30 m)+ | | near Kudremukh |
| Kunchikal Falls | Shimoga | 1,493 ft (455 m) | | River Varahi, near Mastikatte in Shimoga district. Recognised as the highest waterfall in India. |

== Kerala ==
| Name | District | Height | Photo | Details |
|---|---|---|---|---|
| Adimali waterfalls | Idukki | | | near Adimali |
| Adyanpara Falls | Malappuram | | | near Nilambur |
| Alakapuri Falls | Kannur | | | |
| Anakallumpara Falls | Kozhikode | | | |
| Ananthoni Falls | | 20 m (66 ft) | | between Talinji and Manjampatti villages on the Ten Ar River, Manjampatti Valley, Indira Gandhi National Park |
| Anchuruli waterfalls | Idukki | | | |
| Aripara Falls | Kozhikode | | | |
| Aruvi Falls | Trivandrum | | | |
| Aruvikkuzhy Falls | Pathanamthitta | | | near Maramon, Kozhencherry |
| Aruvikkuzhi Waterfalls | Kottayam | | | near Pallickathode |
| Athirappilly Falls | Thrissur | 80 ft (24 m) | | |
| Attukad Falls | Idukki | | | Munnar |
| Attukal Falls | | | | |
| Bona Falls | Trivandrum | | | |
| Braemore Estate Falls | Trivandrum | | | |
| Charpa Falls | Thrissur | | | |
| Cheeyappara Falls | Idukki | | | near Adimali |
| Chellarkovil Falls | Idukki | | | near Thekkady |
| Chethalayam Falls | Wayanad | | | |
| Dhoni Falls | Palakkad | | | |
| Gavi Falls | Idukki | | | Gavi |
| Kaalakkayam Falls | Trivandrum | | | |
| Kanthampara Falls | Wayanad | | | |
| Karithode Falls | Idukki | | | |
| Kattikayam falls | Kottayam | | | near Melukavu and Illickal Kallu |
| Keezharkuth Falls / Rainbow falls | Idukki | | | Udumbannoor village, 25 km from Thodupuzha |
| Kochu kuttalam falls | Kollam | | | Anapettakonkal near Thenmala |
| Kombaikani falls | Trivandrum | | | |
| Kozhippara falls | Kozhikode | | | |
| Kudamutti Falls | Kollam | | | |
| Kumbhavurutty Falls | Kollam | | | near Aryankavu |
| Kurangani falls | Idukki | | | |
| Kuthumkal falls | Idukki | | | Munnar |
| Lakkom Water Falls | Idukki | | | near Munnar |
| Madammakkulam waterfalls | Idukki | | | near Kuttikkanam |
| Madatharuvi Falls | Pathanamthitta | | | near Ranny |
| Manalar falls | Kollam | | | |
| Mankayam Falls/Kurisadi falls | Trivandrum | | | |
| Marmala waterfall | Kottayam | | | near Erattupetta |
| Meenmutty Falls, Thiruvananthapuram | | Trivandrum | | |
| Meenmutty Falls | Wayanad | 984 ft (300 m) | | |
| Meenvallam falls | Palakkad | | | |
| Mulamkuzhi | Ernakulam | | | near Malayattoor in Ernakulam District |
| Muniyara Falls | | | | |
| Nyayamkad Falls | Idukki | | | Munnar |
| Orakkampara falls | Pathanamthitta | | | |
| Oliyarik Waterfalls | Kollam | | | |
| Panieli Poru waterfalls | Ernakulam | | | |
| Palakapandi Water Falls | Palakkad | | | near Kollengode |
| Palaruvi Falls | Kollam | 300 ft (91 m) | | in Aryankavu near Punalur |
| Pathankayam falls | Kozhikode | | | Kalpetta |
| Pattathippara Falls | Thrissur | | | |
| Peringalkuthu | Thrissur | | | near Athirappilly |
| Perunthenaruvi Falls | Pathanamthitta | | | |
| Pindimed Falls | | | | |
| Pookkulam falls | Idukki | | | |
| Powerhouse falls / Chinnakanal falls | Idukki | | | Munnar |
| Punnayar Waterfalls | Idukki | | | |
| Puliyarkota falls | Wayanad | | | Kalpetta |
| Seetharkundu Waterfalls | | | | near Kollengode |
| Siruvani Waterfalls | Palakkad | | | |
| Soochipara Falls/ Sentinelrock falls | in Wayanad | 656 ft (200 m) | | |
| Thenpara Falls | Kozhikode | | | near Thusharagiri |
| Thommankuthu Falls | Idukki | | | near Thodupuzha |
| Thooval waterfalls | Idukki | | | Eetithoppu |
| Thusharagiri Falls | Kozhikode | | | |
| Thuvanam waterfalls | Idukki | | | Munnar |
| Ulakkayurutty falls | Idukki | | | Elappara |
| Urakkuzhi Falls | Kozhikode | | | |
| Valanjanganam falls | Idukki | | | near Kuttikkanam |
| Valanthode Falls | Kozhikode | | | |
| Valara Falls | Idukki | | | near Adimali |
| Vazhachal Falls | Thrissur | | | near Athirappilly |
| Vazhvanthol waterfalls | Trivandrum | | | |
| Vellarimala falls | Kozhikode | | | |

Idukki district alone has about 50 small or big waterfalls, most of which are not included above because of not being well known and some being only active during monsoons. It is the same with Wayanad district, Pathanamthitta district and other hilly districts.

== Madhya Pradesh ==
| Name | District | Height | Photo | Details |
|---|---|---|---|---|
| Bahuti Falls | Rewa | 650 ft (200 m) | | |
| Bhoora Khon Waterfall | | | | |
| Chachai Falls | Rewa | 427 ft (130 m) | | |
| Dhuandhar Falls | Jabalpur | | | |
| Dugdhdhara Waterfalls | Anuppur | | | |
| Gangulpara Tank and Waterfall | | | | |
| Gatha Falls | | 300 ft (91 m) | | |
| Gorakhaal Fall | | | | |
| Kapildhara Waterfalls | Anuppur | | | |
| Keoti Falls | Rewa | 427 ft (130 m) | | |
| Kukdi Khapa Waterfall | | | | |
| Lilahi Waterfall | | | | |
| Pandav Falls | | | | |
| Patalpani waterfall | Indore | 200 ft (61 m) | | |
| Rahatgarh Waterfall | | 50 ft (15 m) | | |
| Pawa Waterfalls | | | | |
| Purwa Falls | | 230 ft (70 m) | | |
| Rajat Prapat | | 350 ft (110 m) | | |
| Raneh Falls | | | | |
| Sanakua Waterfalls | | | | |
| Shambhudhara Waterfalls | | | | |
| Sultan Garh Waterfall | | | | |
| Tincha Falls | | | | |

== Maharashtra ==
| Name | District | Height | Photo | Details |
|---|---|---|---|---|
| Ale's Waterfall | Satara | | | 8–9 km from Mahabaleshwar |
| Amboli Ghat Falls | Sindhudurg | 400 ft (120 m) | | 1 km from Amboli; well known for its fresh and pleasing environs |
| Barki Waterfalls | Kolhapur | | | 65 km (40 mi) from Kolhapur |
| Berki Waterfalls | Kolhapur | | | 4 km (2.5 mi) from Gaganbawada or 75 km (47 mi) from Kolhapur, in Amboli Ghats |
| Bhilar Waterfalls | Satara | | | Seen on the Mahabaleshwar Panchgani road is one of the beautiful falls on the Kudali river arising from the Bhilar village |
| Bhildari Valley Waterfalls | Aurangabad | | | Near 3 km (1.9 mi) from Kannad or 12 km (7.5 mi) from Chalisgaon |
| Bhivpuri Waterfalls | Thane | | | 8 km (5.0 mi) from Bhivpuri railway station, or 20 km (12 mi) from Karjat railway station |
| Chinchghar Falls | Sindhudurg | | | 10 km (6.2 mi) from Kudal town |
| Chinchoti Waterfalls | Thane | 100 ft (30 m) high & 20 ft (6.1 m) broad | | 5 km (3.1 mi) from Mumbai-Palghar highway near Vasai |
| Chinmans waterfalls | Satara | | | It is 2.5 km (1.6 mi) away from Mahabaleshwar, towards the south into the Koyana Valley |
| Chirkehind Waterfalls | Satara | | | In the lower portion of the Ambenali ghat about 6–7 km (3.7–4.3 mi) after the diversion to Ragtag |
| Dabhosa Waterfalls | Thane | 300 ft (91 m) | | 5 km (3.1 mi) from Javhar |
| Dhobi Falls | Satara | 450 ft (140 m) | | 3 km (1.9 mi) from Mahableshwar town, formed on the banks of Koyna River |
| Dodhvne Tivre Falls | Ratnagiri | 200 ft (61 m) | | 10 km (6.2 mi) from Sangameshwar |
| Dudhsagar Waterfalls | Nashik | 100 ft (30 m) | | Located around 8 km (5.0 mi) to the west of Nasik near Someshwar Temple |
| Dugarwadi Waterfalls | Nashik | 450 ft (140 m) | | Approx. 30 km from Nashik, Near Nashik |
| Garambi Waterfalls | Raigad | 100 ft (30 m) | | Located near Murud, 5 km (3.1 mi) from Janjira |
| Gavlideo Hill Falls | Thane | | | 5 km (3.1 mi) from Thane, located near Thane - Belapur road |
| Kandhar Waterfalls | Sangli | | | 25 km (16 mi) from Peth Naka on NH4, 65 km (40 mi) from Sangli, 70 km (43 mi) from Miraj railway junction |
| Kataldhar Lonavla | Pune | 350 ft (107 m) | | 11 km from Lonavala |
| Kelghar Waterfalls | Satara | | | on the Mahabaleshwar-Medha-Satara road almost 14 to 15 kilometers away from the main marketplace |
| Kune Falls | Pune | 659 ft (201 m) | | 10 km (6.2 mi) from old Mumbai-Pune Expressway in Lonvala-Khandala valley |
| Lingamala Waterfalls | Satara | 620 ft (190 m) | | Located 6 km (3.7 mi) away from the famous hill station Mahabaleshwar and at top of the Venna Valley |
| Malsej Ghat Falls | Thane | 400 ft (120 m) | | 45 km (28 mi) from Murbadtown, in the Malsej ghat falls or 115 km (71 mi) from Thane City |
| Mandakini Waterfalls | Satara | | | 25 km (16 mi) from Mahableshwar |
| Marleshwar Waterfalls | Ratnagiri | | | 5 km (3.1 mi) from Devrukh, formed on the banks of Bav River |
| Nagartas Falls | Sindhudurg | 320 ft (98 m) | | 50 km (31 mi) from Kankavli town, in the Amboli Ghat or 100 km (62 mi) from Kolhapur |
| Napne Falls | Sindhudurg | 250 ft (76 m) | | 15 km (9.3 mi) from Vaibhavwadi |
| Needle Point Waterfalls | Satara | | | 20 km (12 mi) from Panchgani, close to Mahabaleshwar-Panchgani route |
| Nivali Falls | Ratnagiri | | | 50 km (31 mi) from Sangameshwar, located on Ratnagiri-Ganpatipule route |
| Ozarde Waterfalls | Patan, Satar | | | 10 km (6.2 mi) from Koyna |
| Palsambe Waterfalls | Kolhapur | | | 45 km (28 mi) from Kolhapur, on the way to Gaganbawada at Palsamba |
| Pandavkada Falls | Raigad | 350 ft (110 m) | | Situated in the hills near Kharghar, Navi Mumbai near Mumbai-Pune Expressway |
| Peb Waterfalls | Raigad | | | 10 km (6.2 mi) from Neral railway station, on the way to Matheran |
| Ramatirth Waterfall | Kolhapur | | | On the banks of Hiranyakeshi river nearly 10 km (6.2 mi) from Ajara |
| Ramdharneshwar Waterfalls | Raigad | | | 20 km (12 mi) from Alibaug, near Khim village |
| Rajmachi Waterfalls | Pune | | | 5 km (3.1 mi) from Khandala, can be seen from Mumbai - Pune Expressway |
| Randha Falls | Ahmednagar | 350 ft (110 m) | | 50 km (31 mi) from Nashik, or 45 km (28 mi) from Kasara railway station |
| Sahastrakunda Waterfalls | Nanded | | | situated on Painganga river at sahastrakund |
| SavDav Waterfalls | Sindhudurg | | | 10 km (6.2 mi) from Kankavli town |
| Sawatkada Waterfalls | Raigad | | | On the way to Garambi, through the village Shighre, near Alibaug |
| Sawatkada Waterfalls | Ratnagiri | | | 1 km from Chiplun city Chiplun city |
| Tamhini Waterfalls | Pune | | | In the Tamihini ghats, near Pune |
| Tapalwadi Falls | Thane | 350 ft (110 m) | | 3 km (1.9 mi) from Neral railway station on the route to Matheran hill station |
| Thoseghar Waterfalls | Satara | 1,150 ft (350 m) | | 36 km (22 mi) from Satara, a full front view of the falls can be obtained by going to Chalkewadi and then walking down the road for 5 km (3.1 mi) |
| Tiger Falls | Pune | | | near Lonavala in Khandala Ghat, 80 km (50 mi) from Mumbai, or 70 km (43 mi) from Pune |
| Tigher Waterfalls | Thane | 300 ft (91 m) | | 10 km (6.2 mi) from Karjat railway station |
| Umbrella Falls | Ahmednagar | | | 50 km (31 mi) from Nashik, or 45 km (28 mi) from Kasara railway station |
| Usarvardhane Waterfalls | Thane | 300 ft (91 m) | | Near the Kansai village, 5 km (3.1 mi) by vehicle and a 45-minute trek thereafter |
| Vajrai Waterfall | Satara | 853 ft (260 m) | | 27 km (17 mi) from Satara District near Kas flower valley |
| Vihigaon Waterfalls | Mumbai | 125 km (78 mi) | | 125 km (78 mi) from Mumbai city near Kasara, on Mumbai-Nashik Highway map |
| Vyaghreshwar Waterfall | Sindhudurg | 300 ft (91 m) | | near Mnche, 30 km (19 mi) from Tarale (which is on Mumbai-Goa highway) |
| Zenith Waterfalls | Thane | 450 ft (140 m) | | 10 km (6.2 mi) from Khopoli railway station, 20 km (12 mi) from Karjat railway station |

== Manipur ==
| Name | District | Height | Photo | Details |
|---|---|---|---|---|
| Barak Falls | Tamenglong | | | |
| Khayang Falls | Ukhrul | | | |
| Sadu Chiru Waterfalls | Kangpokpi | | | Popularly known as Leimaram Falls, Sadar Hills |
| Taphou Falls | Kangpokpi | | | A series of three waterfalls located near Taphou Kuki Village in Manipur |
| Khoupum Waterfalls | Tamenglong | | | |
| Ngaloi Waterfalls | Churachandpur | | | |

== Meghalaya ==
| Name | District | Height | Photo | Details |
|---|---|---|---|---|
| Beadon Falls | Shillong | 394 ft (120 m) | | |
| Bishop Falls | Shillong | 443 ft (135 m) | | |
| Kynrem Falls | Cherrapunjee | 1,000 ft (300 m) | | The highest waterfall in Meghalaya |
| Langshiang Falls | West Khashi Hills | 1,107 ft (337 m) | | |
| Nohkalikai Falls | East Khasi Hills District, Sohra | 1,100 ft (340 m) | | Highest plunge water falls in India |
| Nohsngithiang Falls | Cherrapunjee | 1,035 ft (315 m) | | AKA Seven Sister Falls |
| Sweet Falls | Shillong | 315 ft (96 m) | | |
| Elephant Falls | Shillong | | | |
| Crinoline Falls | Shillong | | | |
| Margaret Falls | Shillong | | | |
| Spread Eagle Falls | Shillong | | | |
| Krang Suri Falls | Amlarem | | | |
| Wah Rashi Falls | Syntung | | | |
| Thum Falls | Nongstoin | | | |
| Weinia Falls | Nongstoin | | | |
| Tyrshi Falls | Sohra | | | |
| Thlumuwi Falls | West Jaintia Hills | | | |
| Pelga Falls | West Garo Hills | | | |
| Rong’bang Falls | West Garo Hills | | | |
| Byrdaw Falls | Pomshutia | | | |
| Lawai Falls | Thynroit | | | |
| Wah Kaba Falls | Sohra | | | |
| Dainthlen Falls | East Khasi Hills District, Sohra | | | |
| Lyngkshiar Falls | Sohra | | | |
| Wei Sawdong Falls | Sohra | | | |
| Umkrem Falls | Umkrem | | | |
| Borhill Falls | Borhill | | | |
| Rainbow Falls | Sohra / Nongriat | | | |
| Kshaid U Ren Falls | Umniuh Tmar | | | |
| Kudoi Falls | Mairang | | | |
| Wahriat Falls | Nongstoin | | | |
| Khoh Ramhah | East Khasi Hills District, Sohra | | | Also known as Motrop |

== Mizoram ==
| Name | District | Height | Photo | Details |
|---|---|---|---|---|
| Tuirihiau Falls | | | | |
| Vantawng Falls | | 324 ft (99 m) | | |
| Badaghagara | Kendujhar | | | |
| Kandhadhar Falls | | | | |
| Sanaghagara Falls | Kendujhar | | | |

== Nagaland ==
| Name | District | Height | Photo | Details |
|---|---|---|---|---|
| Sanctuary Falls | Kohima | | | |

== Odisha ==
| Name | District | Height | Photo | Details | | | |
|---|---|---|---|---|---|---|---|
| Ammakunda Falls | Malkangiri district | | | | | | |
| Ashokjhar | Jajpur | | | Near Sukinda | | | |
| Badaghagara Waterfall | Kendujhar | 60 ft (18 m) | | | | | |
| Bagra Falls | Koraput | 30 ft (9.1 m) | | | | | |
| Barehipani Falls | Mayurbhanj | 1,308 ft (399 m) | | | | | |
| Beniadhus Fall | Nuapada | 24 ft (7.3 m) | | | | | |
| Bhimkund Fall | Kendujhar | | | | | | |
| Budhakholo Falls | Ganjam | 25 ft (7.6 m) | | | | | |
| Chatikona Falls | Rayagada | | | | | | |
| Deokunda Falls | Mayurbhanj | | | | | | |
| Duduma Waterfalls | Koraput | 574 ft (175 m) | | | | | |
| Gandahati Falls | Gajapati | | | | | | |
| Handi Bhanga Waterfall | Kendujhar | 30 ft (9.1 m) | | | | | |
| Harishankar Falls | Balangir | | | | | | |
| Hathi Pathar Falls | Rayagada | | | | | | |
| Joranda Falls | Mayurbhanj | 492 ft (150 m) | | | | | |
| Khandadhar Falls, Sundagarh | Sundergarh | 800 ft (240 m) | | | | | |
| Khandadhar Falls, Kendujhar | Kendujhar | 500 ft (150 m) | | | | | |
| Khanduala Falls | Kalahandi | | | | | | |
| Koilighugar Waterfall | Jharsuguda | 200 ft (61 m) | | | | | |
| Phurlijharan Falls | Kalahandi | 30 ft (9.1 m) | | | | | |
| Pradhanpat WaterFalls | Deogarh | 30 ft (9.1 m) | | | | | |
| Putudi Falls | Kandhamal | | | | | | |
| Machhakunda Falls | Koraput | | | | | | |
| Miriglotah Falls | Sundergarh | | | | | | |
| Nrusimhanath Falls | Bargarh | | | | | | |
| Rabandarh Falls | Kalahandi | | | | Godhas WaterFalls | Nuapada | 120 ft (37 m) |
| Sanaghagara Waterfall | Kendujhar | 30 ft (9.1 m) | | | | | |
| Sonepur Falls | | | | | | | |

== Rajasthan ==
| Name | District | Height | Photo | Details |
|---|---|---|---|---|
| Menal Falls | Chittorgarh | 153 ft | | 22 km from Begun |
| Bhemlat Falls | Bundi | 50 ft | | Bundi |
| Alewa Falls | Alwas | | | |
| Chuliya fall | chittorgarh | 9 m (30 ft) | | Rawatbhata, Chittorgarh |

== Tamil Nadu ==
| Name | District | Height | Photo | Details |
|---|---|---|---|---|
| Agasthiyar Falls | Tirunelveli | | | Vickramasingapuram |
| Agaya Gangai | Namakkal | | | Puliancholai in Kolli Hills |
| Aintharuvi | Tenkasi | | | Five Falls near Kutralam Falls |
| Amirthi Falls | Vellore | | | 25 km (16 mi) south of Javadi Hills |
| Anju Veedu | Dindigul | | | 27 km (17 mi) from Kodaikanal in the Villpatti Range |
| Ayyanar Falls | Virudhunagar | | | 10 km (6.2 mi) south of Rajapalayam |
| Bamen Falls | Dindigul | | | in Palani Hills National Park |
| Bear Shola Falls | Dindigul | | | 2 km (1.2 mi) from Kodaikanal |
| Bheema Falls | Tiruvannamalai | | | In Javadi Hills |
| Bikkanapalli Falls | Krishnagiri | | | Bikkanapalli, Krishnagiri |
| Catherine Falls | Nilgiris | 250 ft (76 m) | | Kotagiri |
| Chinnakallar Falls | Coimbatore | | | Near Pollachi |
| Chitraruvi | Tenkasi | | | Small falls near Kutralam Falls |
| Elk Falls | Nilgiris | | | Kotagiri |
| Fairy Falls | Dindigul | | | 5 km (3.1 mi) from Kodaikanal |
| Gaur Vellaiyan Falls | Dindigul | 52 ft (16 m) | | Kilavarai near Kodaikanal |
| Glen Falls (Tamil Nadu) | Dindigul | | | Vilpatti on Palar (Kallar) |
| Hogenakkal Falls | Dharmapuri | | | River Couvery, 46 km (29 mi) from Dharmapuri |
| Halashana Falls | Nilgiris | 150 ft (46 m) | | Ooty, Tamil Nadu |
| Jalagamparai Falls | Tirupattur | | | Near Yelagiri on Attaru River |
| Kalhutti Fall | Nilgiris | 170 ft (52 m) | | |
| Kalikesam Falls | Kanyakumari | | | |
| Karteri Fall | Nilgiris | | | Aruvankadu |
| Aanaivaari Muttal | Salem | | | 10 km from Attur, 3 km up Kalrayan Hills from the Muttal Lake - Ecotourism, partnership of Tamil Nadu Tourism & Forest Departments |
| Kaviyam Falls | Villupuram | | | |
| Keni Falls | Madurai | | | |
| Kiliyur Falls | Salem | 300 ft (91 m) | | |
| Kolakambai Falls | Nilgiris | 400 ft (120 m) | | |
| Koraiyar Falls | Tiruchirappalli | | | in Pachaimalai near Arumbavur |
| Kottamala Falls | Madurai | | | |
| Kumbakkarai Falls | Theni | | | Kumbakkarai, 8 km (5.0 mi) from Periyakulam on Pambar River |
| Kutharapaanjan Falls | Tirunelveli | | | Panagudi |
| Kuthiraiyar Falls | Dindigul | 295 ft (90 m) | | near Pappampatti from Kukkal on Kudiraiyar River |
| Kutladampatti Falls | Madurai | 90 ft (27 m) | | Kutladampatti |
| Kutralam Falls | Tenkasi | 167 m (548 ft) | | |
| Law's Fall | Nilgiris | | | Coonoor |
| Mangalam Falls | Tiruchirapalli | | | (Mangalam falls) in Pachaimalai |
| Manimuthar Falls | Tirunelveli | | | above the Manimuthar dam, 35 km (22 mi) from Tirunelveli |
| Mayil Uthu Falls | Perambalur | | | 18 km (11 mi) from Esanai in Pachaimalai |
| Masi Falls | Namakkal | | | |
| Masila Falls | Namakkal | | | |
| Monkey Falls | Coimbatore | | | on Coimbatore-Pollachi-Valparai Highways |
| Megam Falls | Villupuram | | | |
| Neptune Falls | Dindigul | | | rapids in Palani Hills National Park |
| Paalaru Falls | Tirunelveli | | | 15 km (9.3 mi) from [Shenkottai] |
| Palar Falls | Dindigul | 338 ft (103 m) | | at 10°19′21″N 77°31′22″E, 10.8 km (6.7 mi) NNE of Kodaikanal |
| Pambar Falls | Dindigul | | | 4 km (2.5 mi) from Kodaikanal also known as Liril Falls |
| Panai Falls | Krishnagiri | | | |
| Papanasam Falls | Tirunelveli | | | near Vickramasingapuram |
| Pazhathotta Aruvi | Tenkasi | | | Fruit Garden Falls or Orchid Falls near Kutralam Falls |
| Pazhaya Courtallam | Tenkasi | | | Old Falls near Kutralam Falls |
| Peraruvi | Tenkasi | | | Main Falls at Kutralam Falls |
| Periyar Falls | Viluppuram | | | Kalrayan |
| Poombarai Falls | Dindigul | 50 ft (15 m) | | Kukkal |
| Pudur Megan Falls | Viluppuram | | | Kalrayan Hills |
| Puli Aruvi | Tenkasi | | | Tiger Falls near Kutralam Falls |
| Puthu Aruvi | Tenkasi | | | New Falls or Palaruvi - Milk Falls - The falls look like milk near Kutralam Falls |
| Pykara lower Falls | Nilgiris | 180 ft (55 m) | | Nilgiris |
| Pykara upper Falls | Nilgiris | 200 ft (61 m) | | Nilgiris |
| Sengupathi Falls | Coimbatore | | | Coimbatore - Siruvani main road |
| Shenbaga Devi Falls | Tenkasi | | | The area is filled with senbhaga trees near Kutralam Falls |
| Shenbaga Thoppu Meenvetti Parai Falls | Virudhunagar | | | This forest cum waterfall is located in the Western Ghats, around 6 km (3.7 mi) from Srivilliputtur. |
| Shenbagathoppu Falls | Virudhunagar | | | 10 km (6.2 mi) south of Srivilliputtur |
| Silver Cascade | Dindigul | 80 ft (24 m) | | 8 km (5.0 mi) from Kodaikanal |
| Siruvani Waterfalls | Coimbatore | | | also known as Kovai Kutralam, at Siruvani, about 40 km (25 mi) from Coimbatore |
| Skamba Falls | Dindigul | | | 8 km (5.0 mi) from Kodaikanal |
| Snake Falls (Tamil Nadu) | Dindigul | | | in Palani Hills National Park |
| Suruli Falls | Theni | | | 123 km from Madurai |
| Thakkam thootam Falls | Dindigul | | | near Palani |
| Thalaiyar Falls (Rat tail) | Dindigul | 975 ft (297 m) | | 6 km from Devadanapatti |
| Thenaruvi | Tirunelveli | | | Honey Falls - the area is known for the honey near Kutralam Falls |
| Thirumoorthy Falls | Tiruppur | | | about 20 km (12 mi) from Udumalpet |
| Thiruppuli Falls | Namakkal | | | |
| Thiruparappu Falls | Kanyakumari | 50 ft (15 m) | | Thiruparappu on Kodayar River |
| Thoovanam Falls | Dindigul | | | or Dhuvanam falls near Amaravathinagar |
| Ullakarvi Falls | Kanyakumari | 55 ft (17 m) | | Azhakiyapandiapuram, 17 km (11 mi) from Nagercoil town |
| Baana Theertham Falls | Tirunelveli | | | Vickramasingapuram |
| Vaideki Falls | Coimbatore | | | 30 km (19 mi) from Coimbatore near Narasipuram |
| Vattaparai Falls | Kanyakumari | | | Near Bhoothapandi, 13 km (8.1 mi) of Nagercoil on Pazhayar River |
| Puliancholai | Tiruchirapalli | | | |
| Varakoorkombai Falls | Namakkal | | | |
| Varayar Falls | Tiruchirapalli | | | |
| Vathalmalai Falls | Dharmapuri | | | |
| Velli Falls | Villupuram | | | |
| Yaanai Kasam Falls | Madurai | | | |
| Yaanai Ootru Falls | Tiruchirappalli | | | |

== Telangana ==
| Name | District | Height | Photo | Details |
|---|---|---|---|---|
| Kuntala Waterfall | Adilabad | 45 m (148 ft) | | This waterfall is the highest waterfall in Telangana State. |
| Pochera Falls | Adilabad | 20 m (66 ft) | | Situated about 35 km (22 mi) from Nirmal, on National Highway no.7, and is on the way to Adilabad. |
| Mallela Theertham Falls | Mahabubnagar | | | It is located around 58 km (36 mi) from Srisailam, Andhra Pradesh . |
| Bogatha Waterfall | Jayashankar Bhupalpally | | | It is located in Koyaveerapuram G, Wazeedu Mandal, 120 km from Bhadrachalam. |
| Gayatri Waterfalls | Adilabad | | | It is located near Nirmal |
| Paarakaphi Waterfalls | Adilabad | | | It is located near Utnoor |
| Savatula Gundam Waterfalls | Adilabad | | | 30 km from Asifabad |
| Sirnapally Waterfalls | Nizamabad | | | 20 km from Nizamabad |

== Uttar Pradesh ==
| Name | District | Height | Photo | Details |
|---|---|---|---|---|
| Lakhaniya Dari Waterfall | Mirzapur | 150 metres (490 ft) | | 30 km from Chunar |
| Sirsi Waterfall | Mirzapur | | | It's located on the Sirsi River, about 45 km from Mirzapur and 60 km from Vindhyachal |
| Tanda Waterfall | Mirzapur | 30 feet (9 meters) | | A scenic waterfall and picnic spot located about 14 km south of Mirzapur. It's surrounded by a water reservoir and natural flora and fauna, and is easily accessible by road. |
| Sidhnath Ki Dari Waterfall | Mirzapur | 100 feet | | It's located in the Mirzapur district, about 14–20 kilometers from Chunar and 30 kilometers from Varanasi. |
| Vindham Waterfall | Mirzapur | 58 meters (190 feet) | | It's located about 2 kilometers from the BHU South Campus |
| Devdari Waterfalls | Chandauli | 58 meters (190 feet) | | located in the Chandraprabha Wildlife Sanctuary in Chandauli, Uttar Pradesh, India, about 65 kilometers from Varanasi |
| Rajdari Waterfall | Chandauli | 65 meters | | located in the Chandraprabha Wildlife Sanctuary in Chandauli, Uttar Pradesh, India, about 65 kilometers from Varanasi |
| Mukha Waterfalls | Sonbhadra | 100 feet | | situated on Robertsganj-Ghorawal-Mukha Dari road approximately 55 km in the west of Robertsganj |
| Shabari Waterfalls | Chitrakoot | 100 feet | | located at the beginning of the Mandakini River, near the town of Jamunihai, and about 8 kilometers south of Markundi town in Chitrakoot |
| Chuna Dari Waterfall | Mirzapur | 50 meters(165 feet) | | It's located in Jangal Mahal, Chunar, Mirzapur District, |

== Uttarakhand ==
| Name | District | Height | Photo | Details |
|---|---|---|---|---|
| Birthi Falls | | 410 ft (120 m) | | |
| Corbett Falls | | 18 ft (5.5 m) | | |
| Gauri Kund | | | | |
| Kempty Falls | Mussoorie | 40 ft (12 m) | | |
| Pushpawati Falls | | | | |
| Surya Kund | | | | |
| Tapta Kund | | | | |
| Tiger Falls | | 312 ft (95 m) | | |
| Vasudhara Falls | | 400 ft (120 m) | | |
| Neer Garh Falls | Rishikesh | | | |

== See also ==
- List of waterfalls
- List of waterfalls in Karnataka
- List of waterfalls in India by height
