= Bap Teng Kang Waterfall =

Bap Teng Kang Waterfall is a waterfall in the city of Tawang in Arunachal Pradesh, India. It has a height of over 100 feet (30 m).

== See also ==
- List of waterfalls
- List of waterfalls in India
