= Mavinagundi Falls =

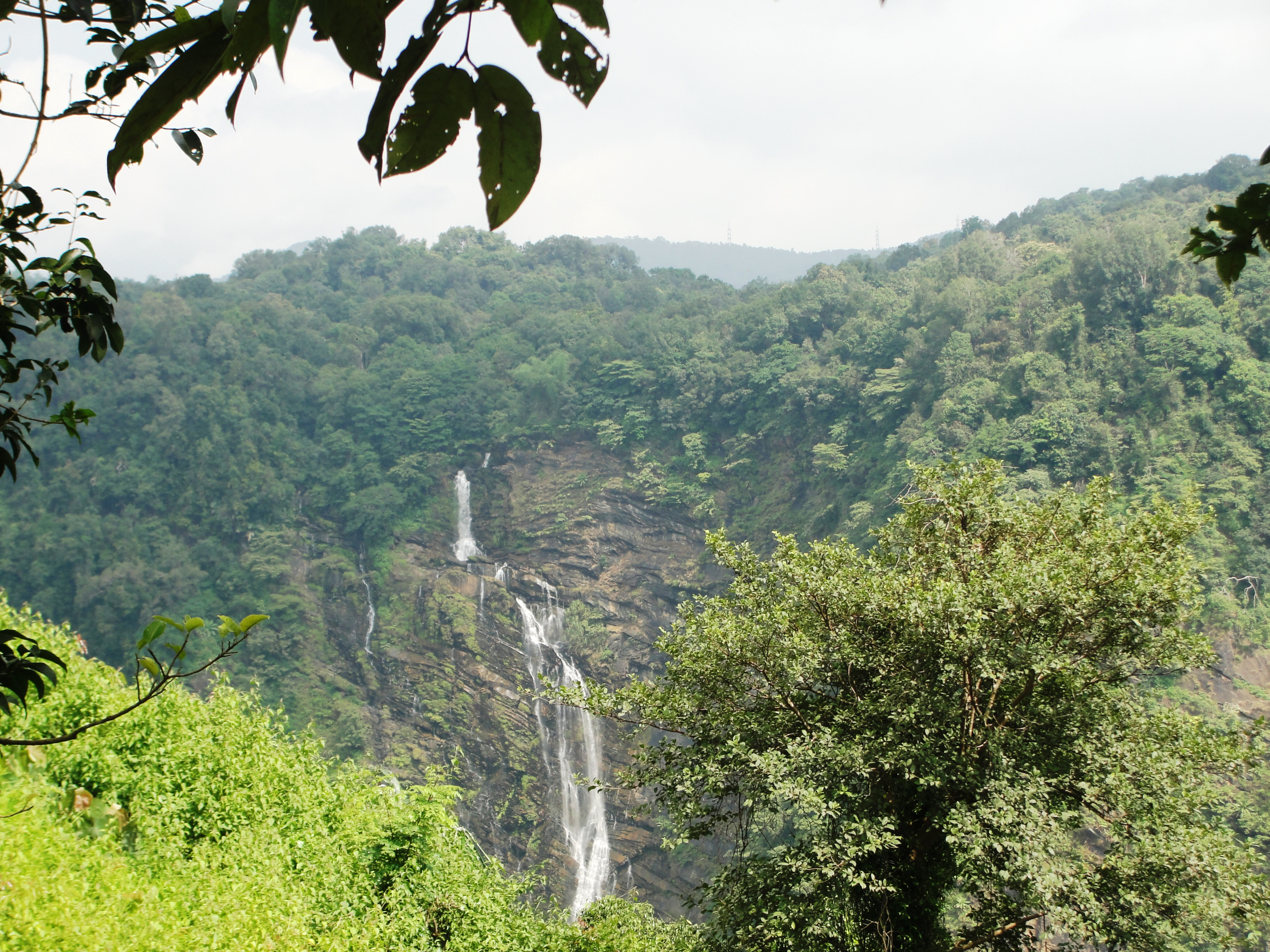
Mavinagundi Falls

Mavinagundi Falls is a waterfall located in Siddapura Taluk, Uttara Kannada district, Karnataka, India and it fills with water only during the monsoon season. The falls are formed by Mavinagundi river.

== View points ==
Mavinagudi Falls is visible from Jog Falls during June - November period and the falls are surrounded by forest filled mountain range.

== See also ==
- List of waterfalls
- List of waterfalls in India
