= Akashiganga Waterfalls =

The Akashiganga water falls in Karbi Anglong district is in the Indian state of Assam. It rises from a thickly forested hill at an elevation of 900 metres (3,000 ft). The falls drop by 140 feet (43 m), and there is a temple dedicated to Shiva here. The water fall is held in reverence and devotees visit the fall to take bath on the religious occasion of Magh Bihu.

== Location ==
The Akashiganga in the Karbi Anglong District is on the National Highway 36 which is 11.6 km distance from Doboka Town.

== Legend ==
According to the Sati's legend, Shiva was carrying his wife Sati's dead body and roaming around the universe in great fury for an unjust act. In order to bring Shiva to his normal poise Vishnu dismembered Sati's dead body with his chakra, and her head is believed to have fallen near Akashiganga. Hence the place is a revered pilgrimage location for Hindus who visit in very large numbers on the day of the Makar Sankranti, which is called Magh Bihu in Assam, to take bath in the holy water fall to wash off their sins.

== Features ==
The Akashiganga water falls forms a stream known as Bablang. The name of Akashiganga finds mention in the 18th chapter of Kalika purana.

The Government of Assam with its capital at Dispur had in 2010 proposed an investment of Rs 42 lakhs to improve infrastructure facilities such as drinking water, electricity and aesthetics around the falls to promote tourism. In view of fluoride content in the water quality of the falls, the Assam Tourism Development Corporation suggested an alternate source of water supply.

== See also ==
- List of waterfalls
- List of waterfalls in India
