= Koosalli Waterfalls =

Waterfall in India

Coordinates: 13°57′51″N 74°40′55″E

The Koosalli Waterfalls is a large waterfall located in a deep, rocky forest near Koosalli village in Byndoor taluk, Udupi District in Karnataka, India. Koosalli Waterfalls is a cascading waterfall with six different waterfalls dropping from a height of 470 feet.

== See also ==
- List of waterfalls
- List of waterfalls in India
