= Punnayar Waterfalls =

Waterfalls in Kerala, India

Njandirukky Waterfalls
- Interactive map of Njandirukky Waterfalls
- Location: Idukki district, Kerala, India
- Coordinates: 9°57′39″N 76°56′41″E

Punnayar Falls is located in the Idukki district, Kerala, India. The waterfall is located 40 km from Thodupuzha Vannapuram. It can be seen in maximum flow only from October to December.

== See also ==
- List of waterfalls
- List of waterfalls in India
