= Wah Kaba Falls =

Coordinates: 25°18′41″N 91°43′58″E

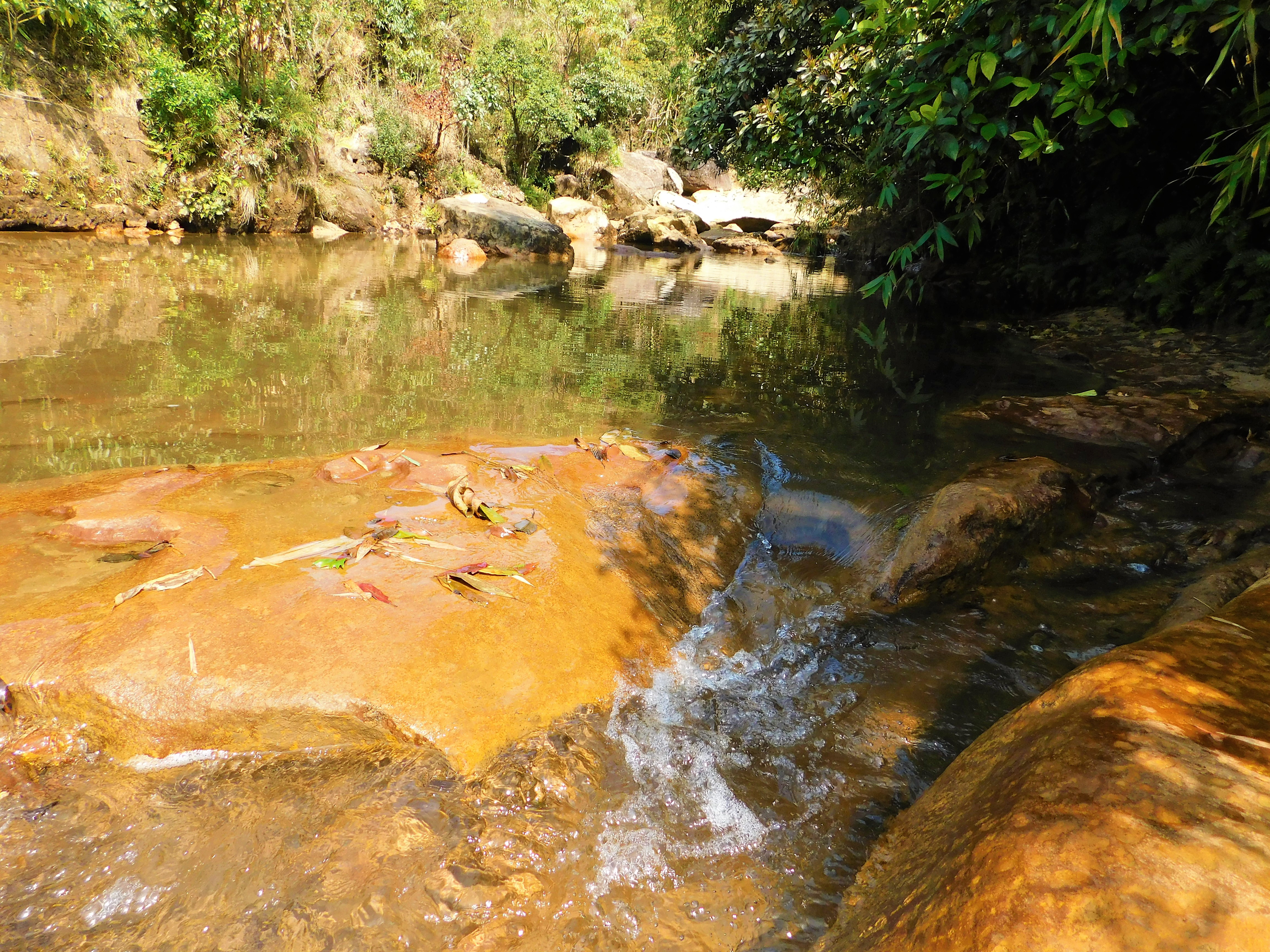
Wah Kaba at top

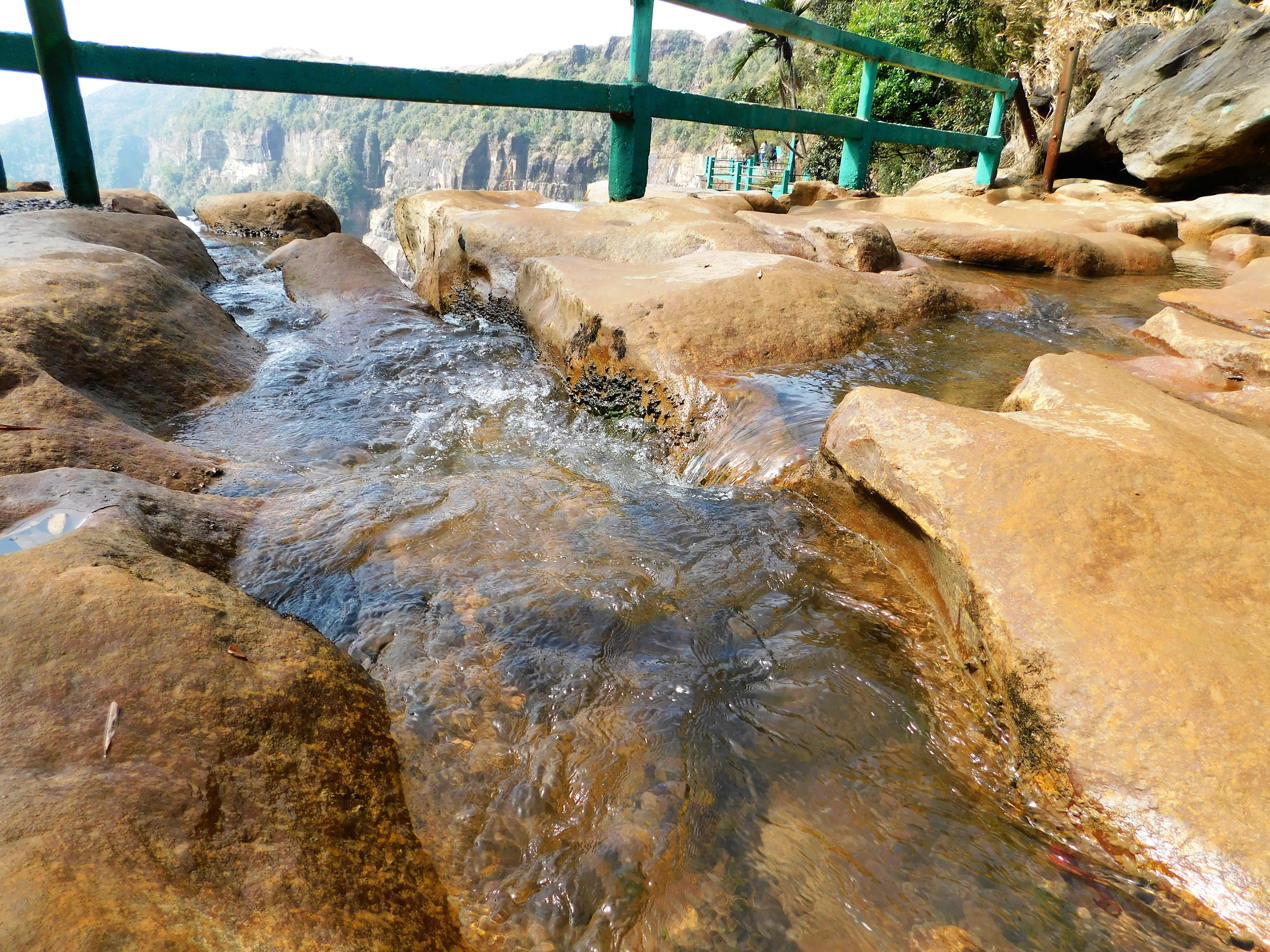
Before water plunges

Wah Kaba Falls is a waterfall located near Cherrapunji in Meghalaya, in the north eastern India. The waterfall descends from a steep rockface and drops approximately 170–190 metres into a gorge. There is a local legend that two fairies live at the falls. The falls can be seen on the way to Cherrapunji from Shillong.

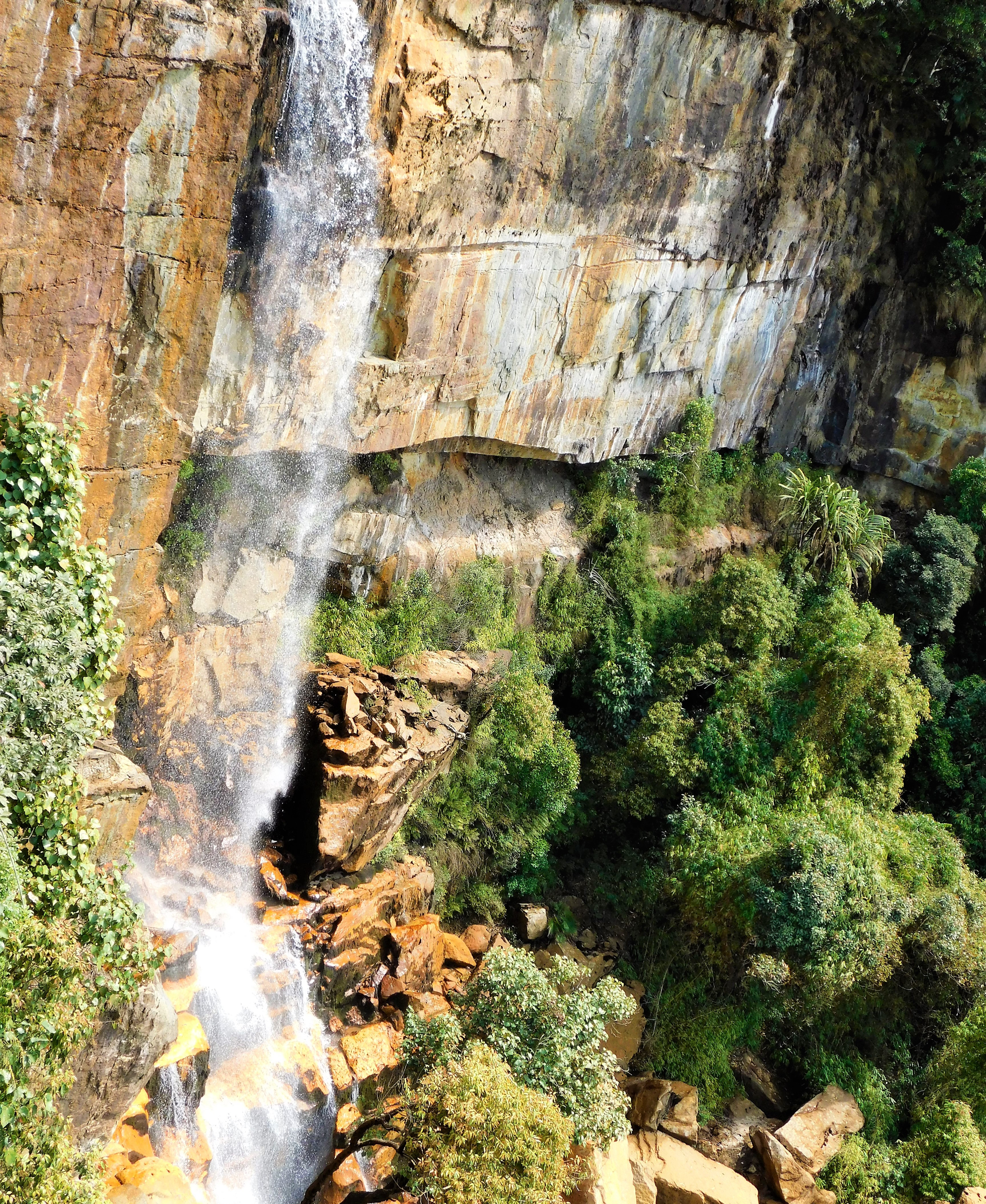
Wah Kaba Falls

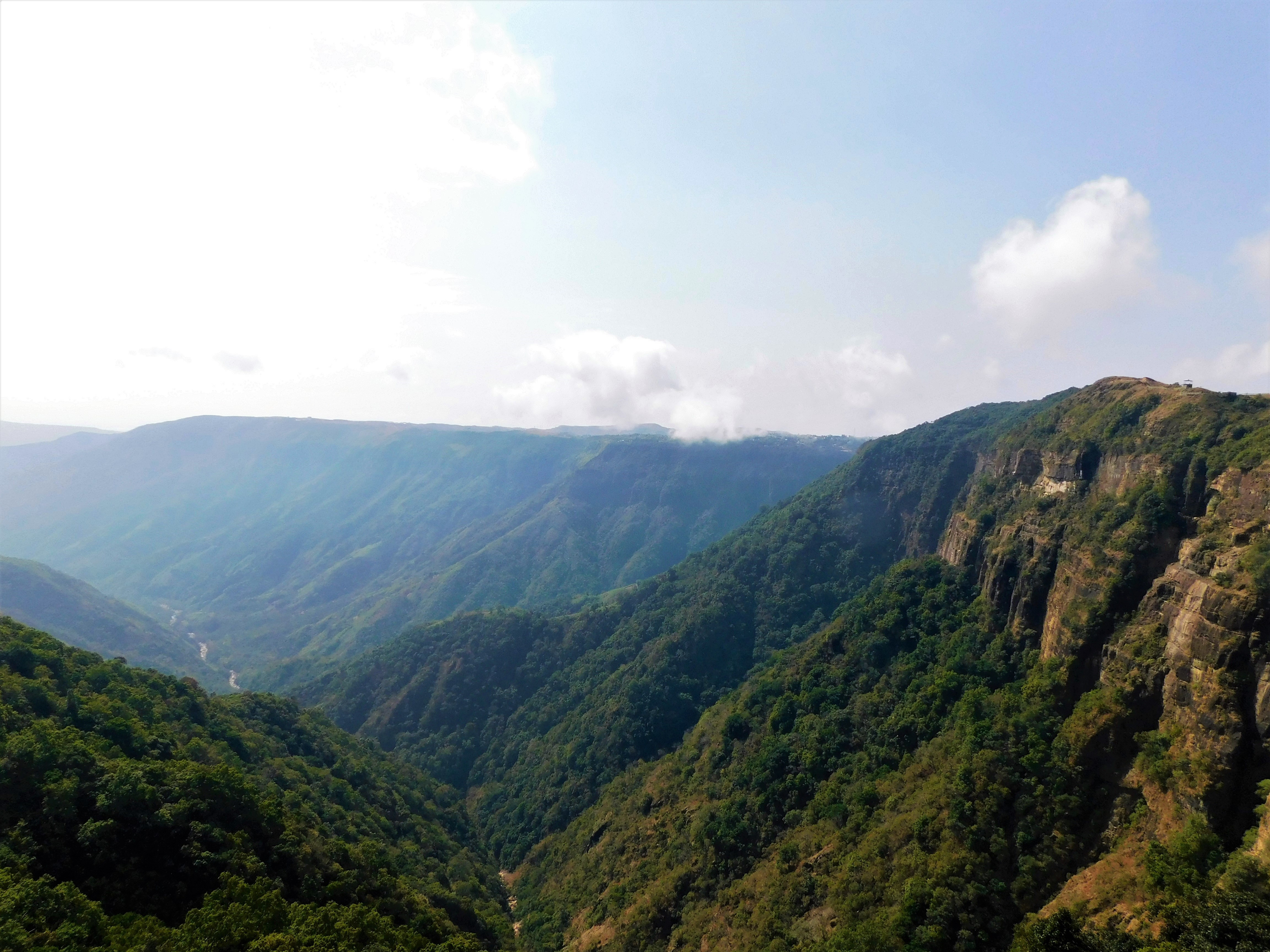
View from Wah Kaba Falls

== Gallery ==
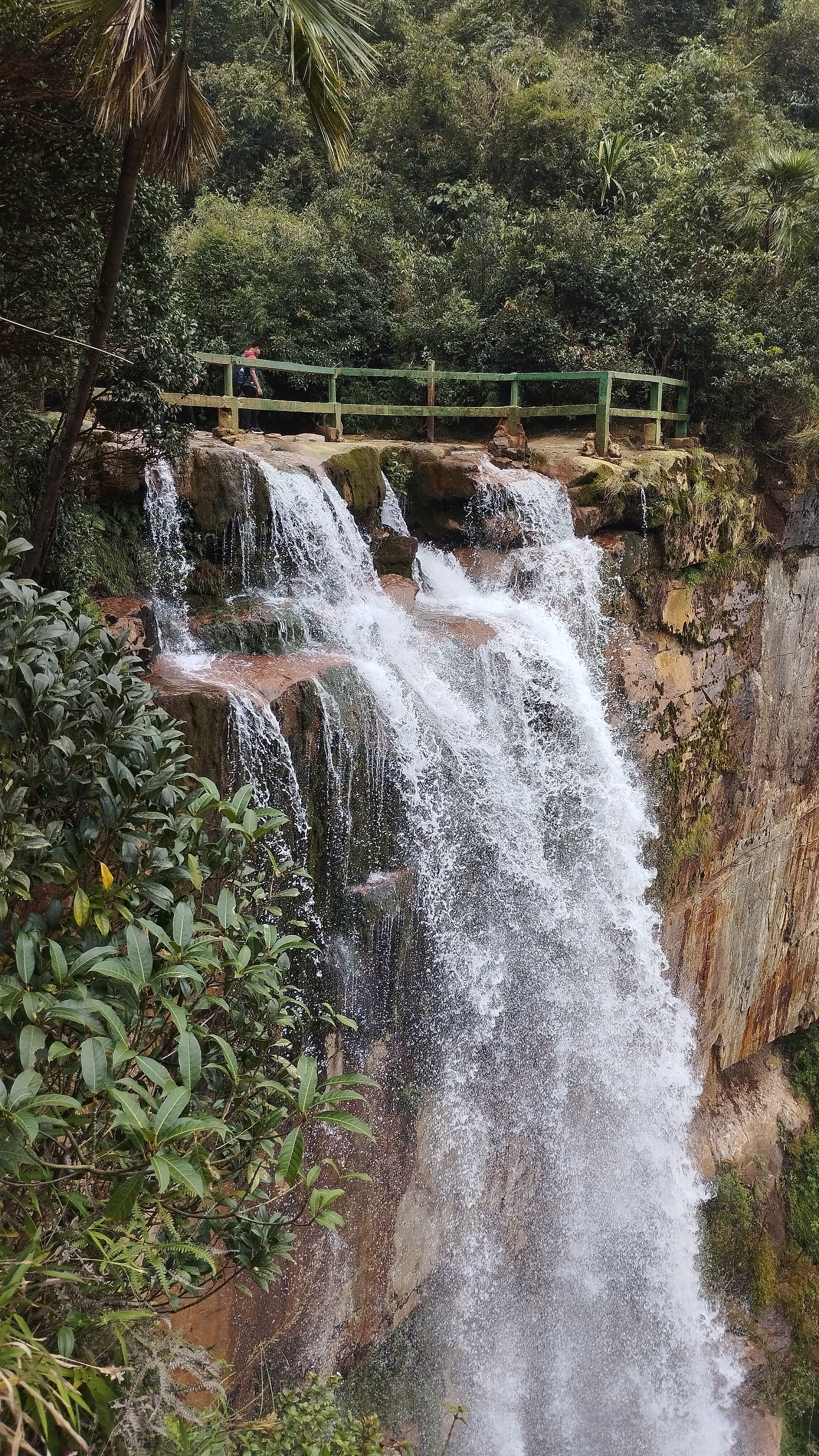
Wah Kaba Falls

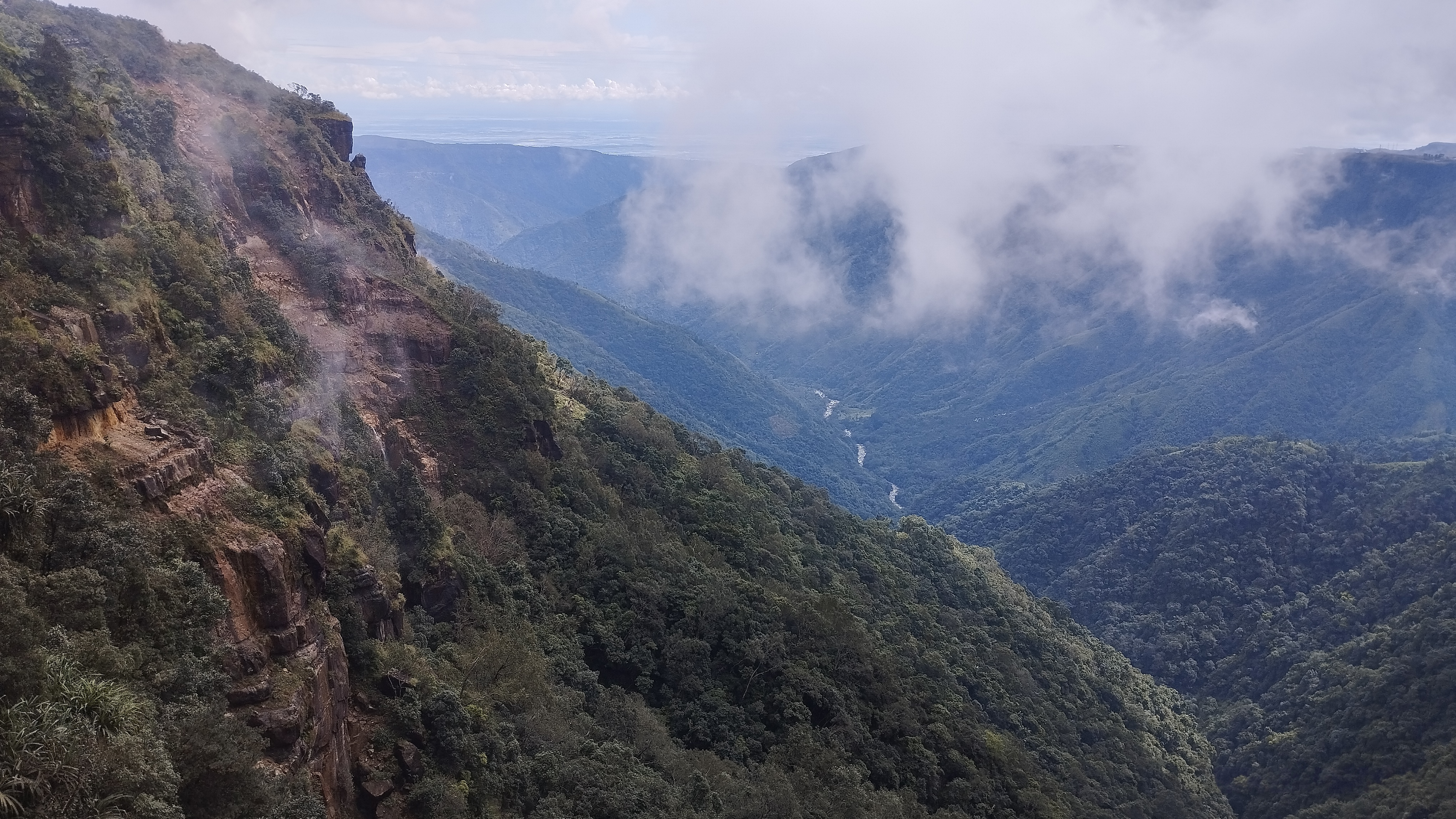
Wah Kaba Falls View Point

== See also ==
- List of waterfalls
- List of waterfalls in India
