= Paarakaphi Waterfalls =

Waterfall in Telangana, India

Paarakaphi Waterfalls are one of the many waterfalls located in Adilabad district, Telangana, India It is located near Utnoor.

== See also ==
- List of waterfalls
- List of waterfalls in India
