= Katiki Waterfalls =

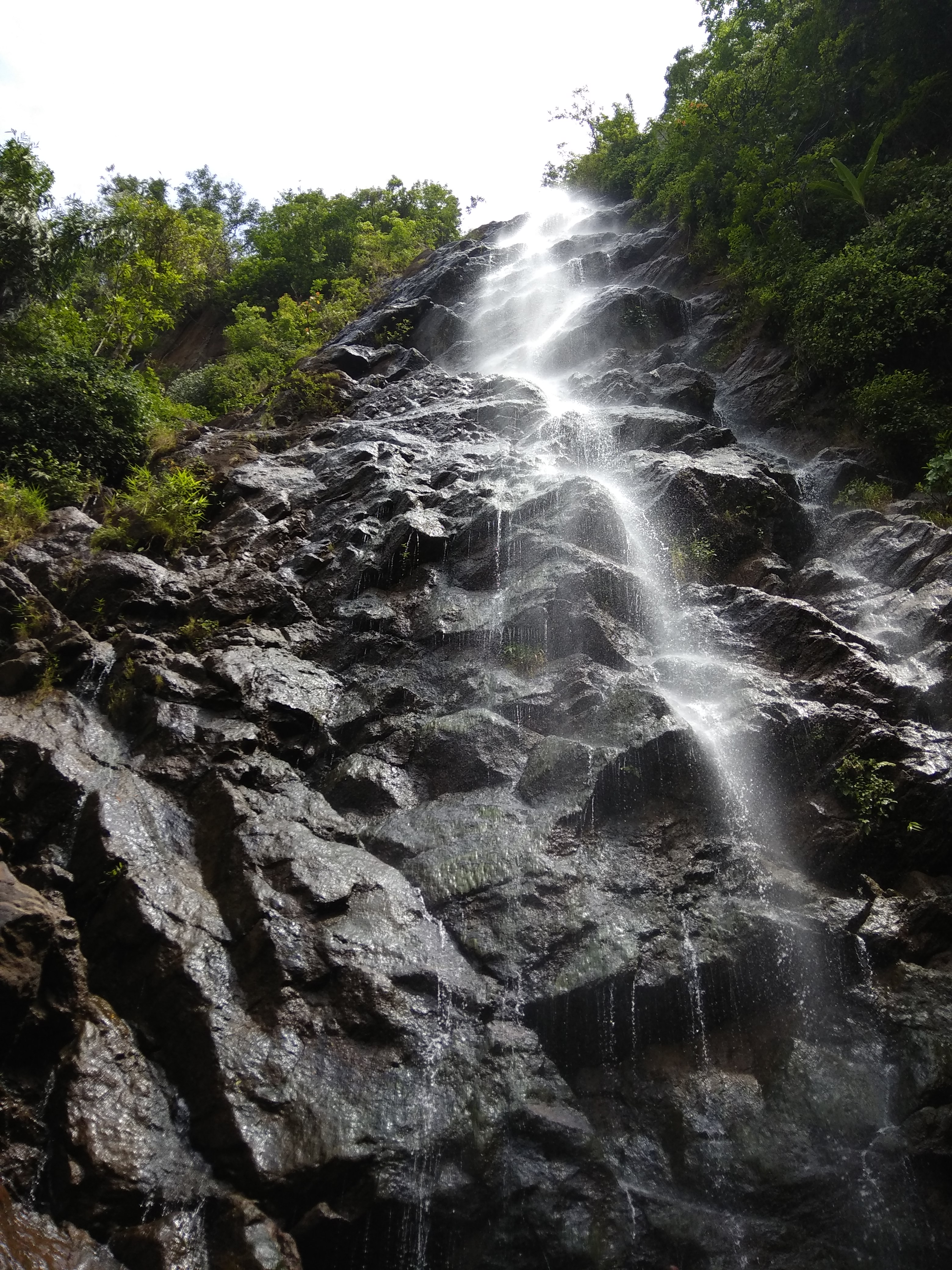
- Interactive map of Katiki Waterfalls
- Location: Alluri Sitharama Raju district, Andhra Pradesh, India
- Coordinates: 18°16′46″N 82°59′56″E

Katiki Waterfalls is located in Alluri Sitharama Raju district of the Indian state of Andhra Pradesh. The waterfall originates at River Gosthani. The waterfall is named after its location Katiki. This waterfall is near to borra caves and distance will be around 30 km by road.

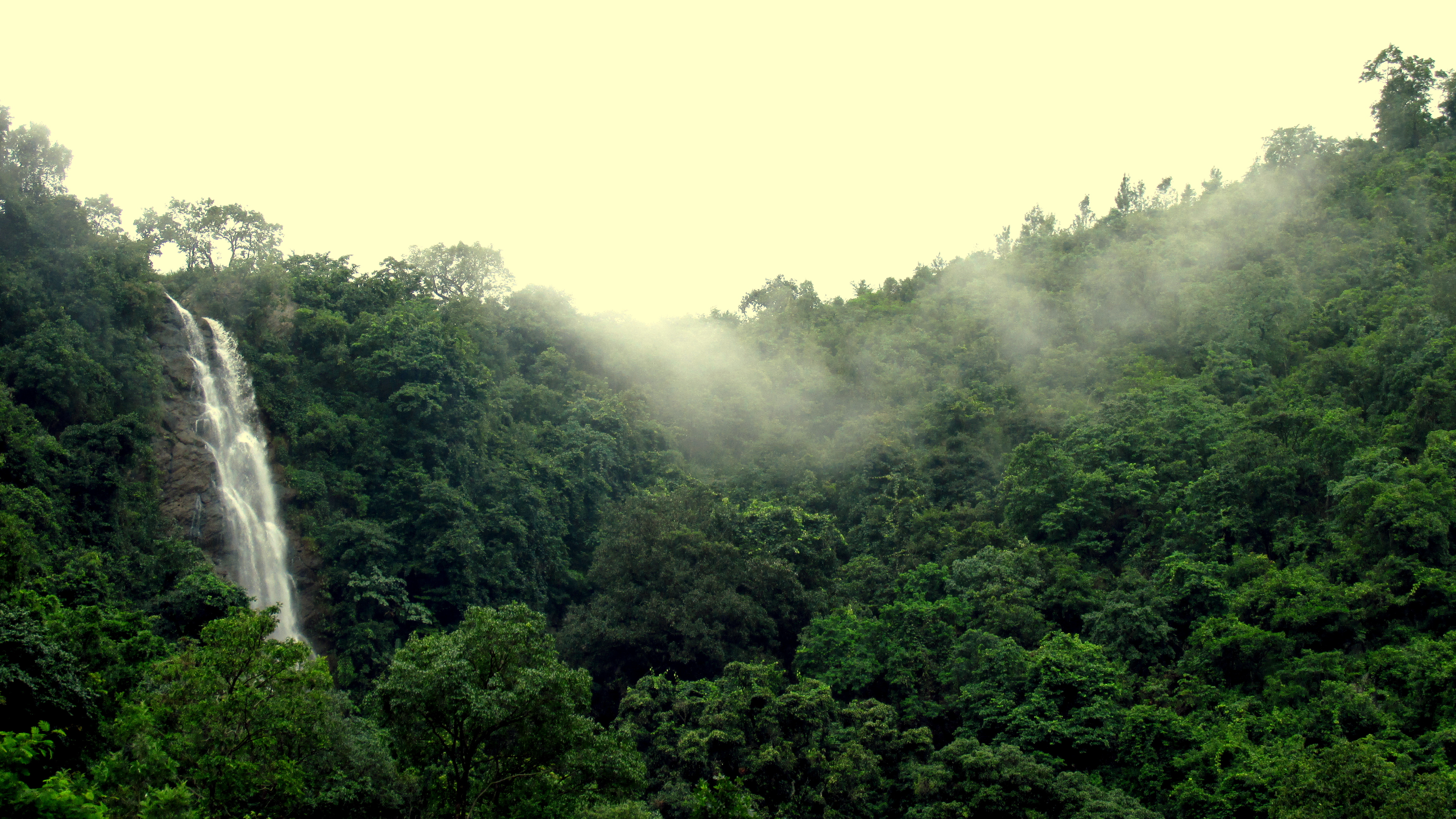
Remote view

== See also ==
- List of waterfalls
- List of waterfalls in India
