= Vazhvanthol Waterfalls =

Waterfall in Kerala, India

- വാഴ്‌വന്തോൾ വെള്ളച്ചാട്ടം
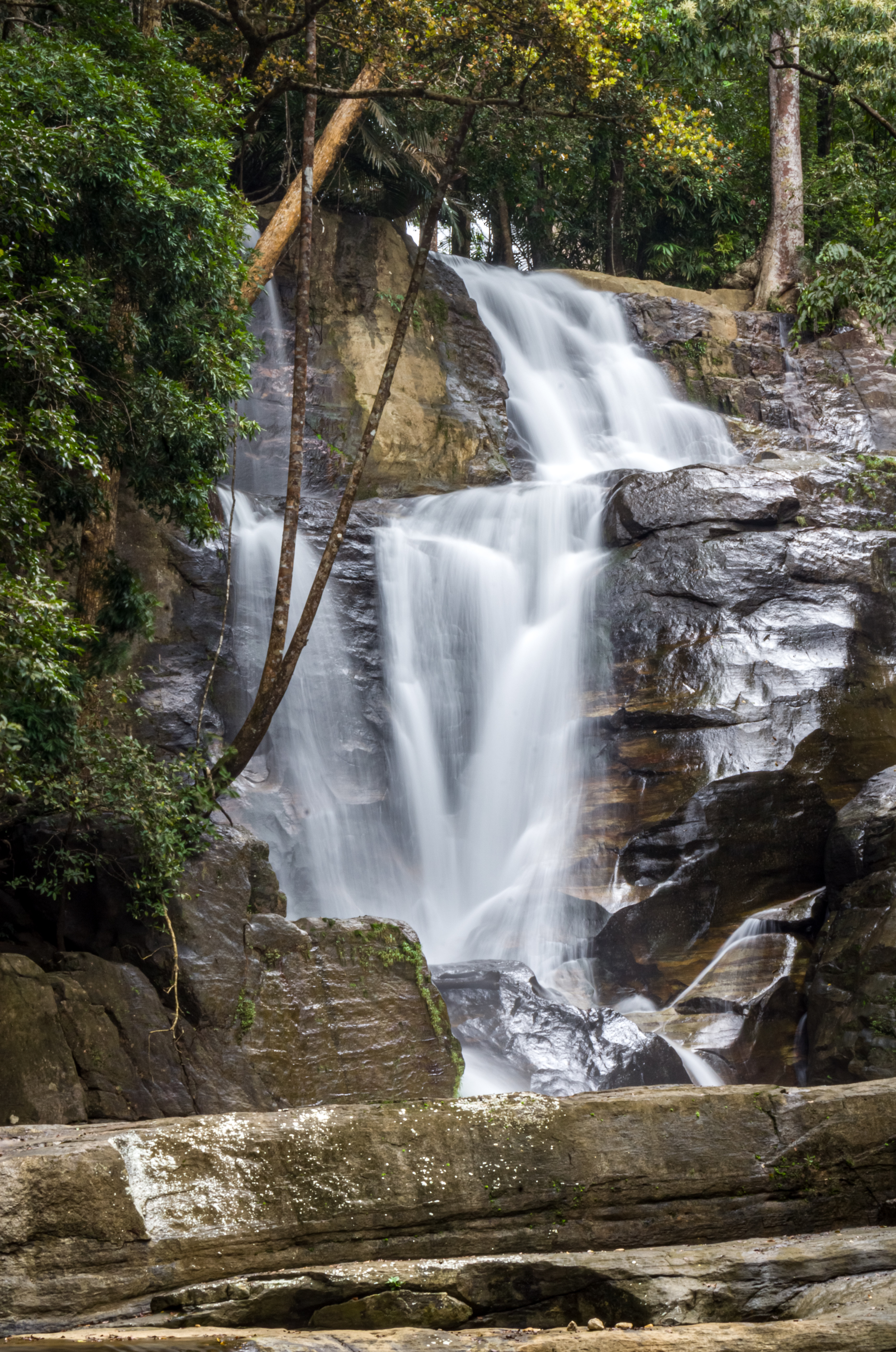
- Slow shutter photograph of Vazhvanthol waterfalls

- Location within Kerala Location within India
- Location: Bonacaud
- Coordinates: 8°40′29″N 77°09′48″E
- Type: Multi-step

Vazhvanthol Waterfalls is a scenic waterfalls located inside Peppara Wildlife Sanctuary in Thiruvananthapuram district of Kerala state, India. It is situated around 46 km (29 mi) from Thiruvananthapuram on the way to Bonacaud.

== See also ==
- List of waterfalls
- List of waterfalls in India
