= Lalguli Falls =

Waterfall in Karnataka, India

Lalguli Falls is a waterfall located at a distance of 13 kilometres (8.1 mi) from Yellapur in Uttara Kannada district, Karnataka, India. It is named after the nearby Lalguli village. It is fed from the Kali River and is about 250 feet in height with stepped falls inside a forest. The best season to visit is from October to December and during summer it will be dry.

== See also ==
- List of waterfalls
- List of waterfalls in India
