= Sita Falls =

Waterfall in Jharkhand, India

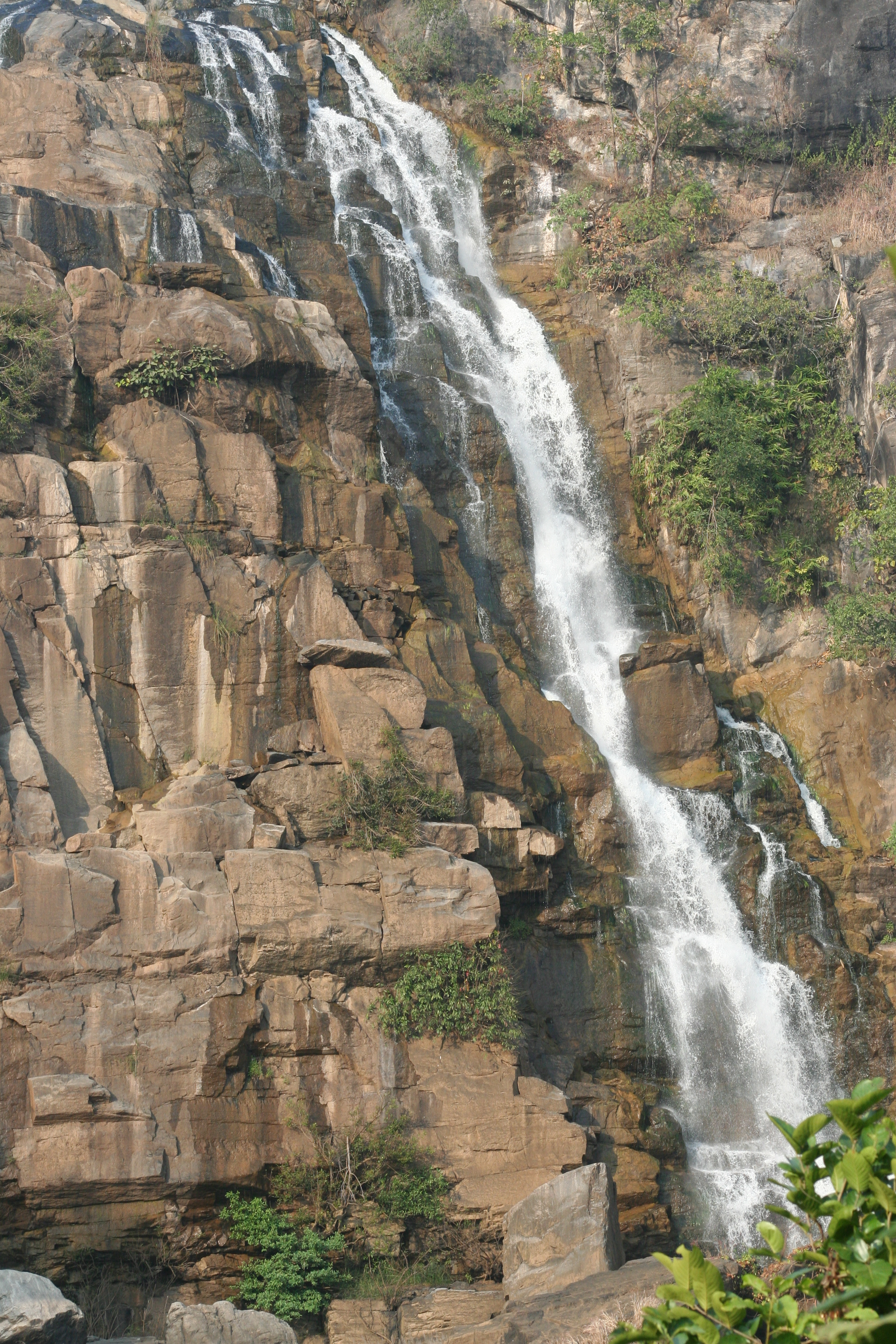
- Sita falls

- Location within Jharkhand
- Location: Ranchi district, Jharkhand, India
- Coordinates: 23°20′30″N 85°38′38″E
- Total height: 43.90 metres (144.0 ft)
- Longest drop: 144 ft (44 m)
- Watercourse: Radhu River

Sita Falls is a waterfall located in Ranchi district in the Indian state of Jharkhand.

== Description ==
The Sita fall is in Radhu river which is a tributary of the Subarnarekha River. The falls drop from 43.90 metres (144.0 ft).

== Location ==
Sita Falls located in Ranchi district. It is at 40 kilometres (25 mi) east of Ranchi in Ranchi-Purulia road or NH-32.

== See also ==
- List of waterfalls
- List of waterfalls in India

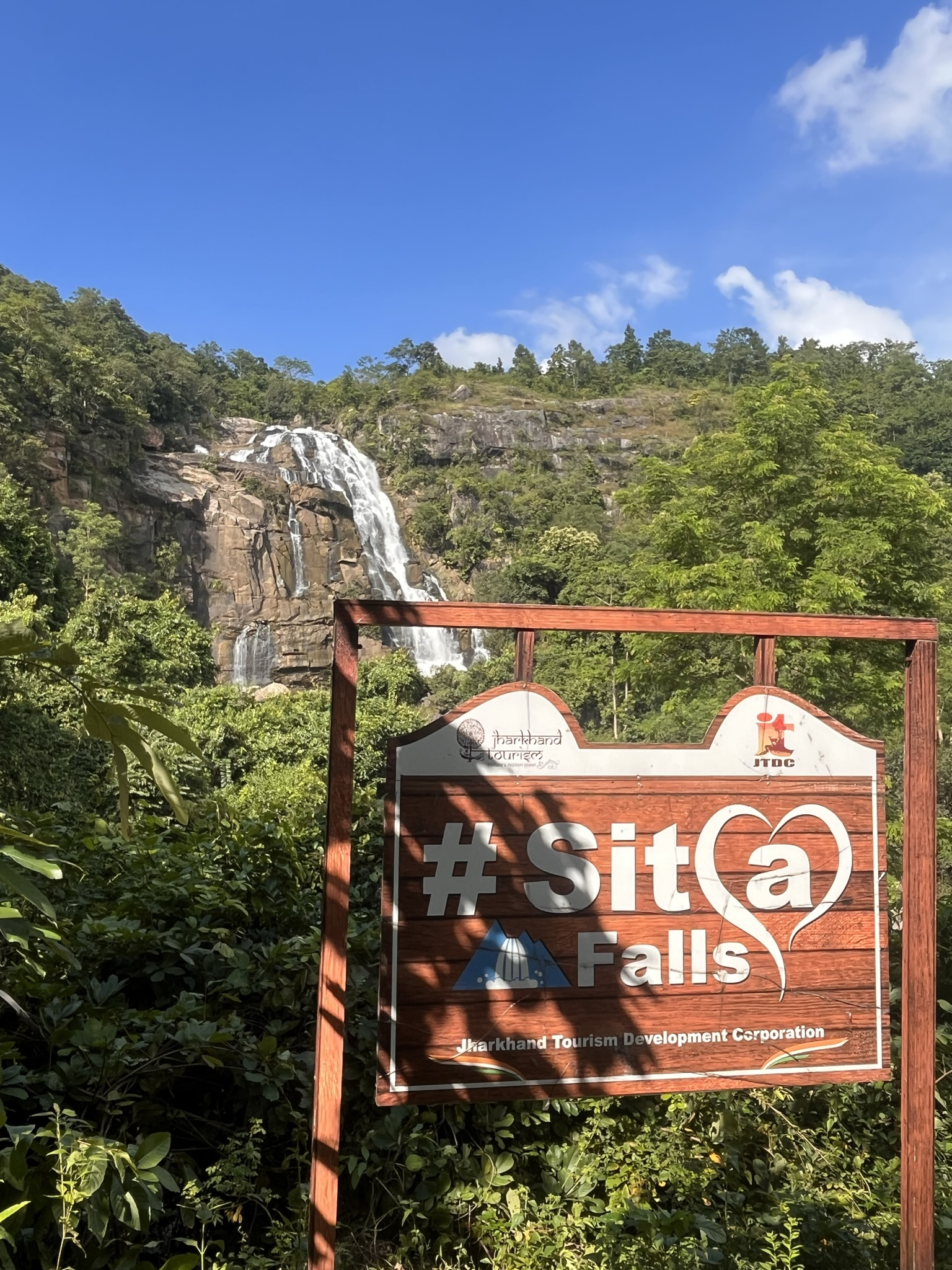
A Jharkhand Tourism board mentioning the name of the Falls with the Sita Falls in the backdrop.
