= Rehala Falls =

Rehala Waterfalls
- Interactive map of Rehala Waterfalls
- Location: Himachal Pradesh, India
- Coordinates: 32.336°N 77.218°E
- Type: Cascade, Punchbowl
- Total height: 2,501 m (8,205 ft)

The Rehala Falls (also Rahala, Rahalla or Rahla) is a cascade/punchbowl type waterfall located 16 km north of Manali on the Leh–Manali Highway south of the Rohtang Pass within the Himalayan mountain range. The Rehala waterfall is a tourist attraction in the state of Himachal Pradesh, India. The waterfall is surrounded by a forest of Birch and Deodar trees. The waterfall freezes when the temperature drops below freezing point. The location is surrounded by several hiking and climbing trails.

== See also ==
- List of waterfalls
- List of waterfalls in India
