= Sissu Falls =

Waterfall in Himachal Pradesh, India

Coordinates: 32°27′58″N 77°7′20″E

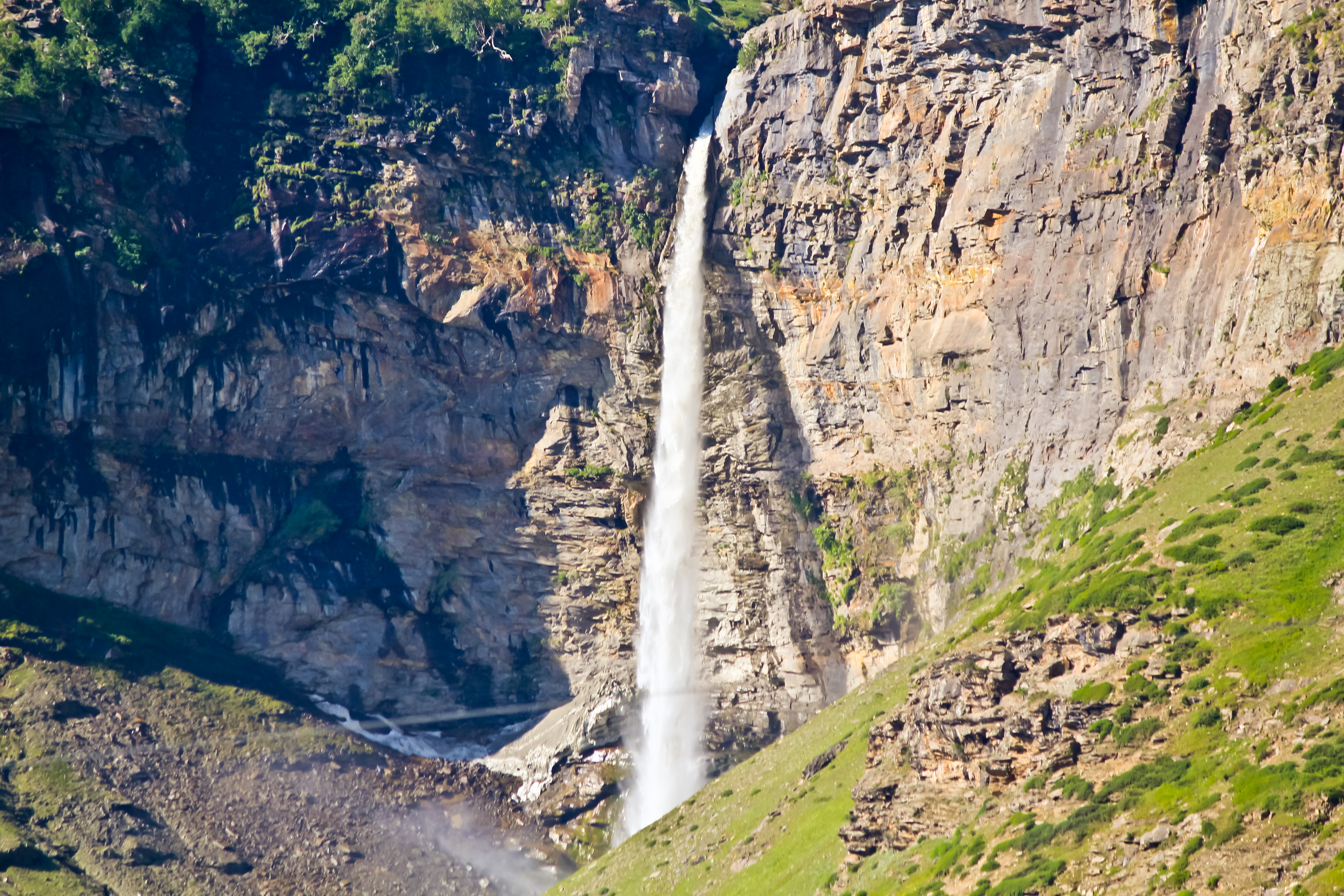
Sissu Falls

Sissu Falls is located on is on a diversion on the Leh–Manali Highway in Lahaul and Spiti district, Himachal Pradesh. The source of water is the suspended glaciers on the Himalayan range.

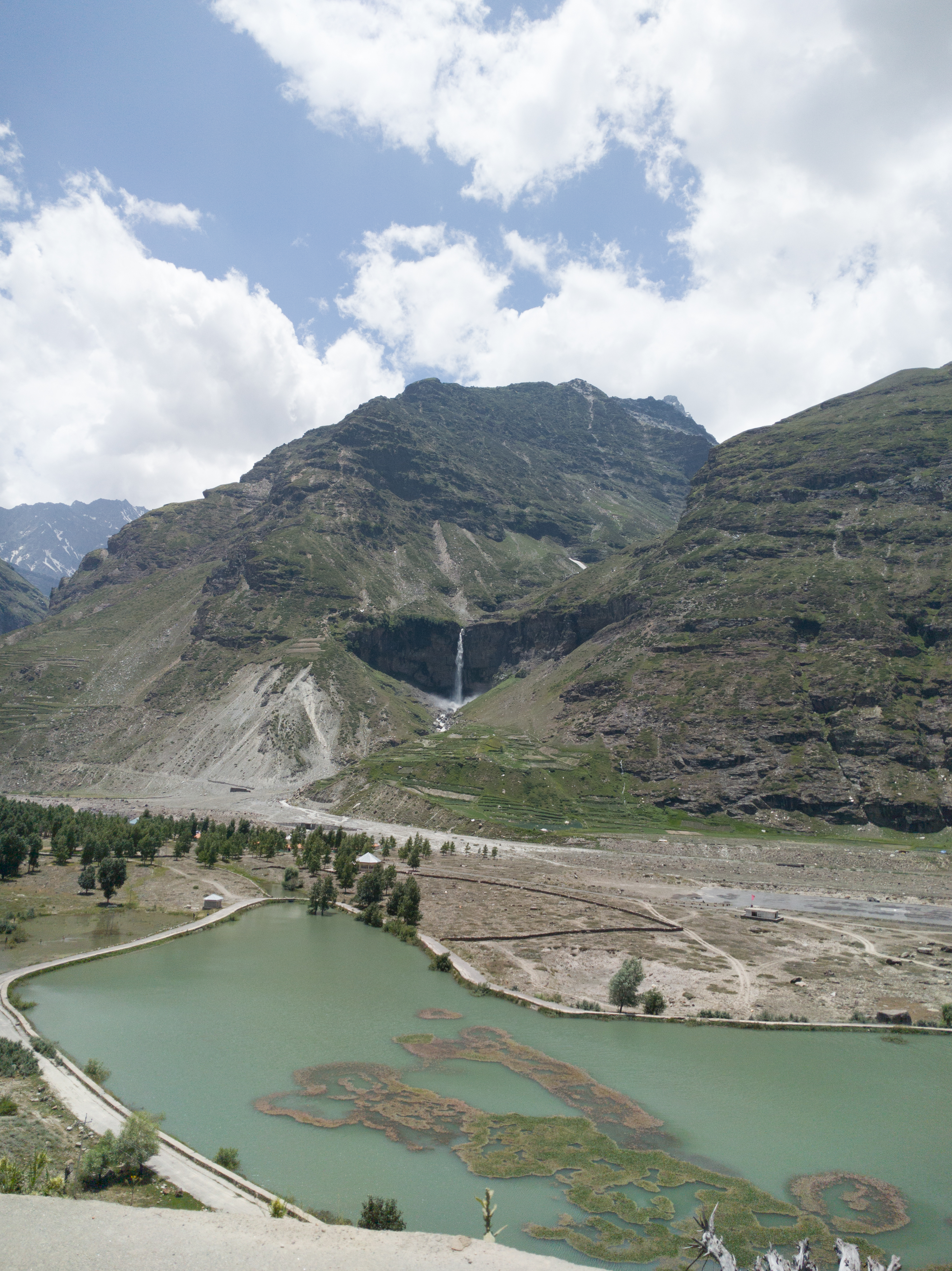
Surroundings

== See also ==
- List of waterfalls
- List of waterfalls in India
