= Dabhosa Waterfalls =

Waterfall in Dabhosa, Maharashtra, India

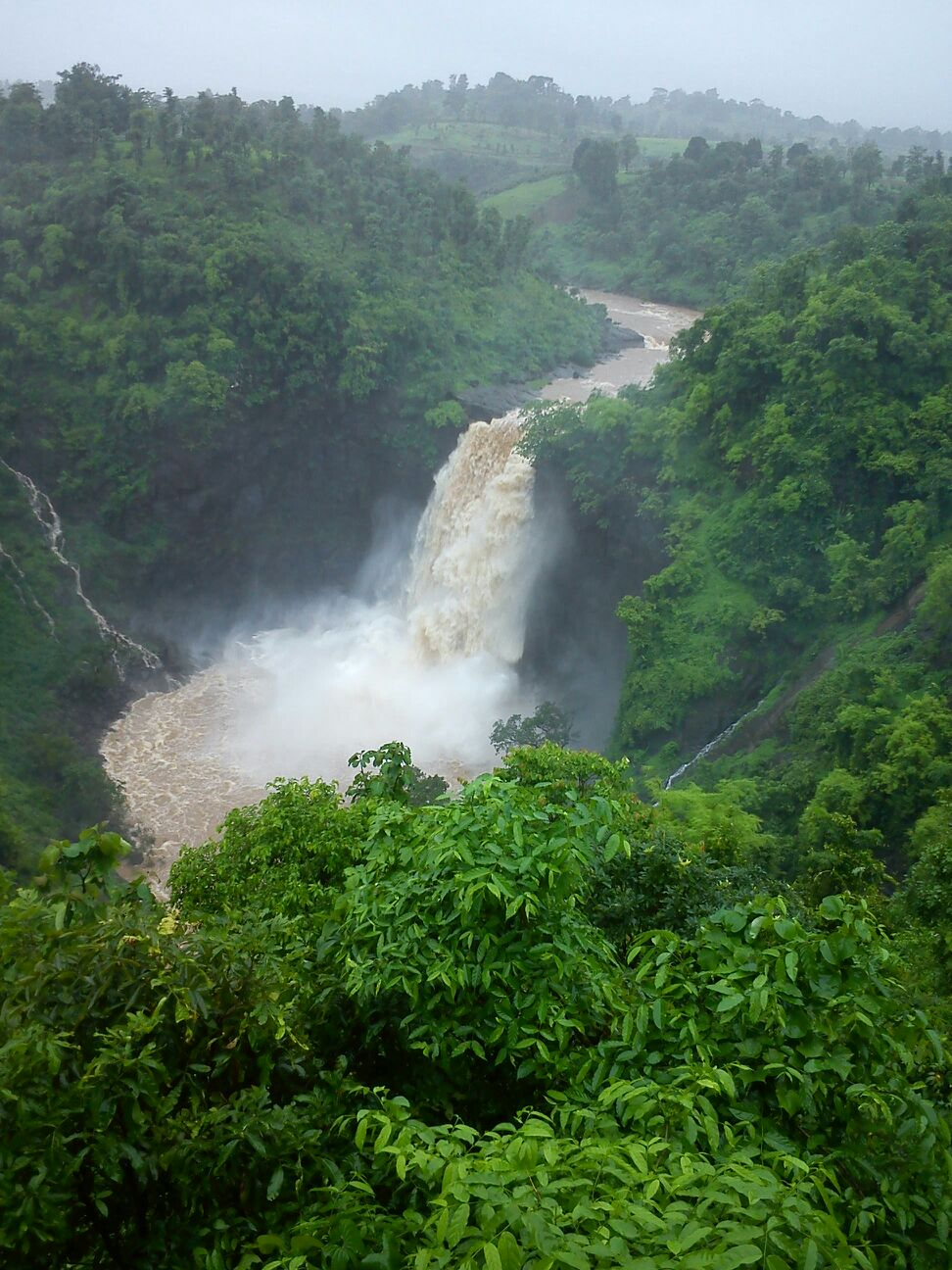
Dahbosa Waterfall during monsoon

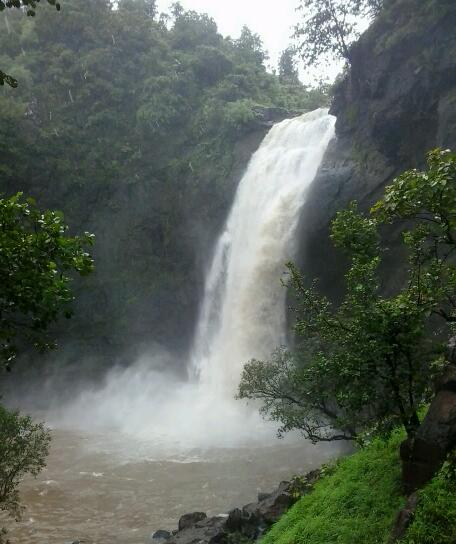
Dabhosa waterfall is the biggest waterfall in Maharashtra in Jawhar City.

Dabhosa Waterfall is a waterfall situated in the village of Dabhosa in Jawhar Tehsil, Palghar district, Maharashtra, India. This is one of the highest waterfalls situated near Mumbai. This waterfall is located over the Lendi River and cascades down from a height of 300 feet. Dabhosa Waterfall is a beautiful waterfall especially during the monsoon season.

Dabhosha Waterfall is an adventurous spot for kayaking, trekking, valley crossing, and fishing. The nearest railway station to the waterfall is Igatpuri railway station in Nasik.

== See also ==
- List of waterfalls
- List of waterfalls in India
