= Kailasakona Falls =

Waterfall in Andhra Pradesh, India

Kaulesha Kona or Kailasa kona is a waterfall in Narayanavanam mandal, Tirupati district, Andhra Pradesh in India. A temple of Lord Shiva and Parvathi is located nearby. The waterfall has a height of around 40 feet. Apart from the main falls near the temple of Lord Shiva and Parvathi, there are two smaller falls with a height of approximately 4 to 6 feet, halfway through the main road to the main falls. These two smaller waterfalls drain into small ponds. There are no paved roads to these two falls.

== How to reach ==
Kailasakona Falls or Kone Falls is situated on the Uttukottai - Puttur - Tirupathi road. The main falls can be easily reached by car. There is ample space for more than 10 cars to be parked at the car parking. From the car parking, the main falls can be reached by 3 to 5 minutes walk, through well laid steps. This path is illuminated at night.

Kailasakona is located on the National Highway 40 of Kadapa to Chennai.

== See also ==
- List of waterfalls
- List of waterfalls in India
