= Lakhaniya Dari Waterfall =

Waterfall in Uttar Pradesh, India

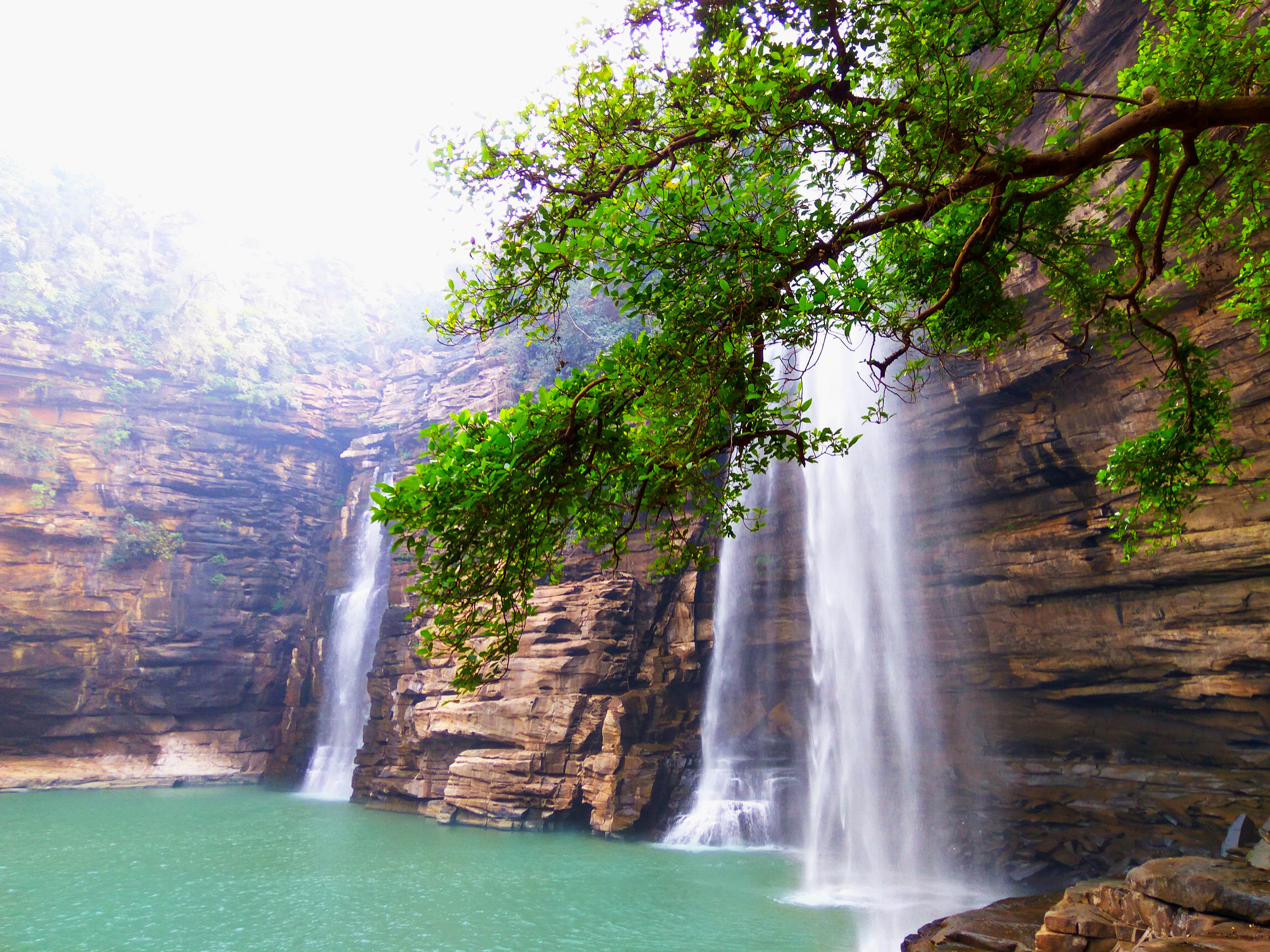
- The waterfall of the Lakhaniya Hills

- Location within Uttar Pradesh Location within India
- Location: Latifpur, Mirzapur district, Uttar Pradesh, India
- Coordinates: 24°57′32″N 83°00′31″E
- Type: Plunge Waterfall
- Total height: 150 metres (490 ft)

Lakhaniya Dari Waterfall is a waterfall in Latifpur, Mirzapur District, Uttar Pradesh, India. It is located along the Lakhaniya Valley, about 50 kilometres south of Varanasi. The waterfall has a height of 150 metres.

== See also ==
- List of waterfalls
- List of waterfalls in India
