= Marmala Waterfall =

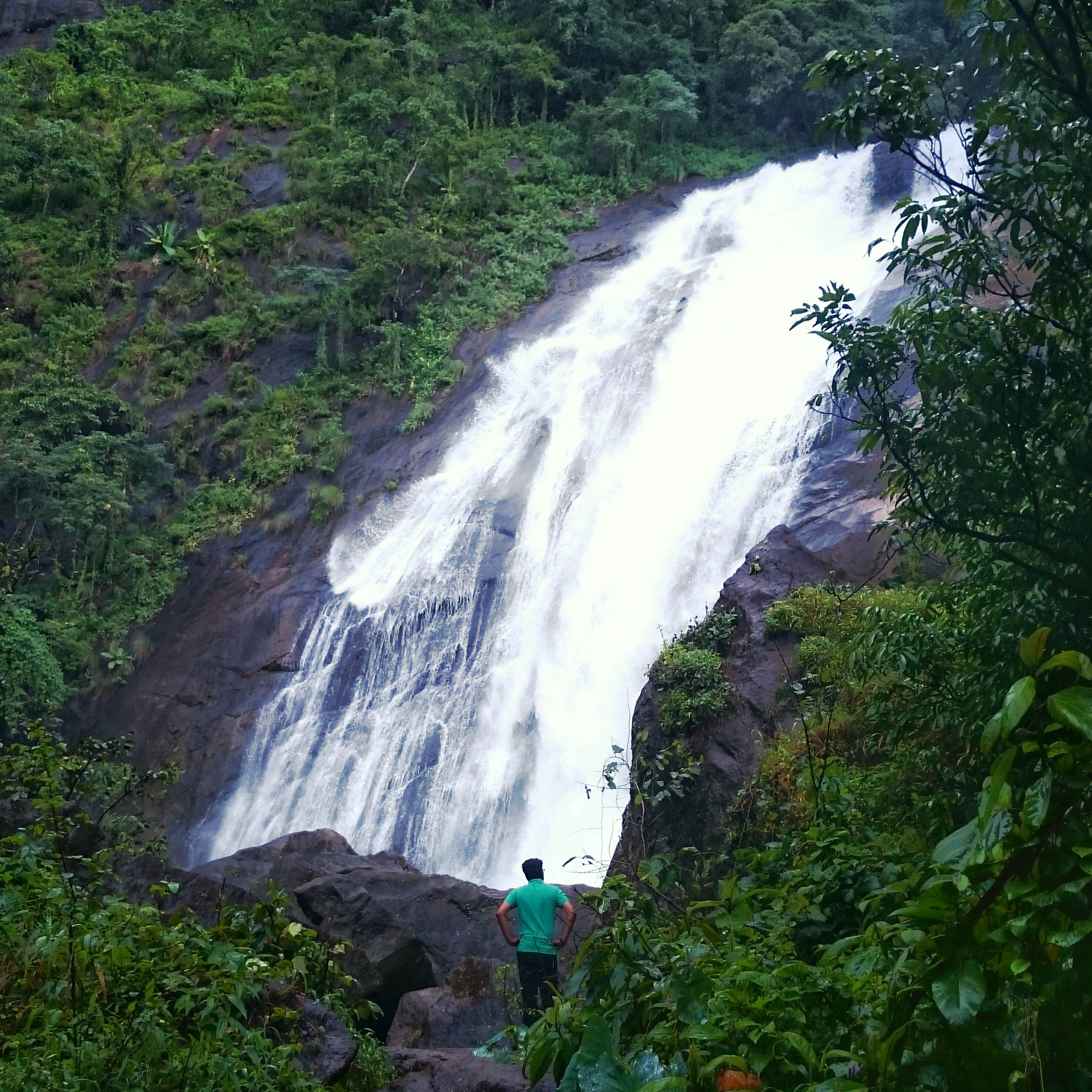
- Interactive map of Marmala Waterfall
- Location: Thalanadu and Teekoy, Kottayam district, Kerala, India
- Coordinates: 9°42′39″N 76°50′55″E

Marmala Waterfall is a waterfall which is located a few kilometres away from Erattupetta, in Kottayam district, Kerala, India, It is exactly 8 km from Teekoy. The road from Mangalagiri to Marmala Waterfall is currently under construction. One has to trek through the middle of an estate, over the slippery rocky path, in order to reach the waterfalls. Marmala waterfall is about 40 meter in height, plunging into a 12-meter deep pool and feeds the River Teekoy.

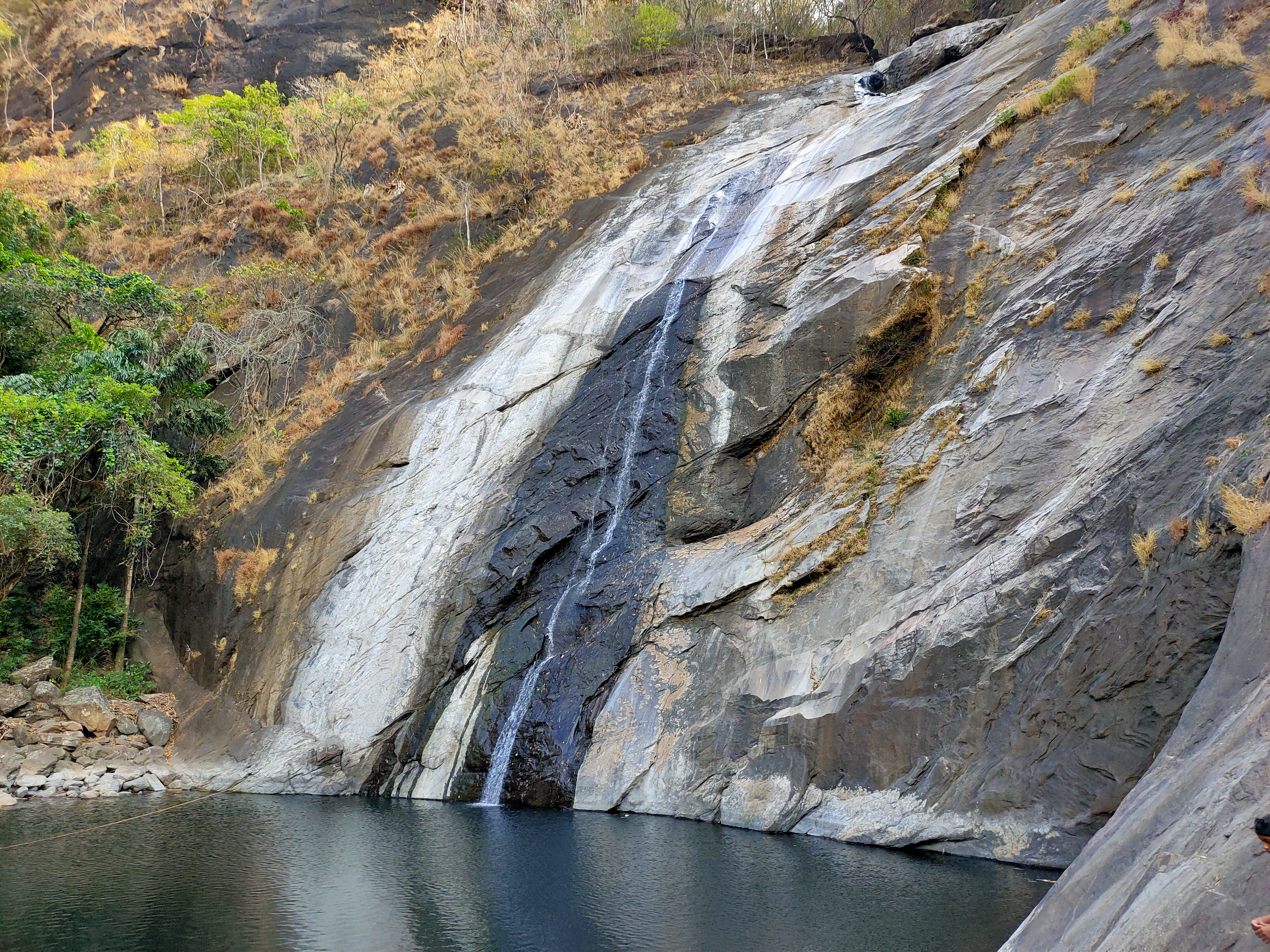
Dry season

== Reaching there ==
The nearest railway station is Kottayam about 45 km from the falls. The nearest place with paved road is Teekoy, which is a rubber estate. From there it is a 5 km off-road ride and another 2 km trek.

== See also ==
- List of waterfalls
- List of waterfalls in India
