= Vajrai Waterfall =

Waterfall in Maharashtra, India

Coordinates: 17.709°N 73.815°E

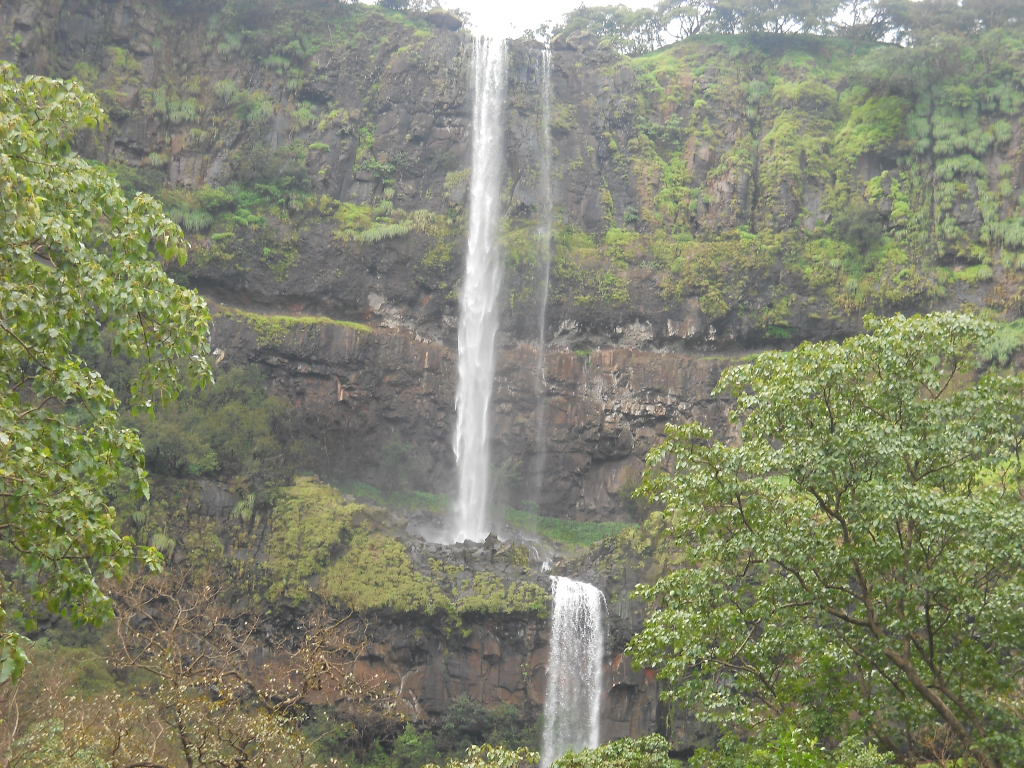

The Bhambavli Vajrai Waterfall is a waterfall located on the Urmodi river in India. It is approximately 27 kilometres (17 mi) from the city of Satara, Maharashtra, near the village of Bhambavli and Sahyadri Hill. The height of the waterfall combining all three tiers is 560 metres (1,840 ft).

== See also ==
- List of waterfalls
- List of waterfalls in India
