= Pattathippara Falls =

- Location: Thrissur District, Kerala, India
- Watercourse: Peechi River

Pattathippara Falls is a cascade waterfall located in Pananchery Grama Panchayat in Thrissur district of Kerala, India. The entry into waterfalls area is blocked since it is inside the reserve forest. Unauthorized entry will attract imprisonment 1 to 5 years and up to ₹5000 as fine. The waterfall is three-tiered but appears in rainy seasons as a single fall.

== See also ==
- Athirappilly Falls
- Vazhachal Falls
- Chalakudy
- List of waterfalls
- List of waterfalls in India
- List of waterfalls in India by height
