= Sanctuary Falls =

Waterfall in Nagaland, India

- Interactive map of Sanctuary Falls
- Location: Khonoma, Kohima District, Nagaland, India
- Coordinates: 25°35′30″N 94°00′48″E
- Watercourse: Dzüko River

The Sanctuary Falls is a waterfall located in Khonoma in the Indian state of Nagaland. It lies within the Khonoma Nature Conservation and Tragopan Sanctuary.

== Location ==
Sanctuary Falls is situated along the borders between Nagaland and Manipur.

== See also ==
- List of waterfalls
- List of waterfalls in India
