= Badri Falls =

Waterfall located in the place of Solan, Himachal Pradesh, India

Badri Falls also known as Badrinath Waterfalls, is a waterfall located in the place of Solan, Himachal Pradesh, India. This is a small waterfalls adjoining the ice cold Alaknanda River which originates from the top of the hill and flows down where the Badrinath Temple is located.

The Badri waterfall is located in a background of snow mountains and heavy rocks. The place looks beautiful since the snow with misty and foggy clouds covering the area. This waterfall is said to be with medicinal value and was proved.

== See also ==
- List of waterfalls
- List of waterfalls in India
