= Tiger Falls =

Waterfall in Uttarakhand, India

Coordinates: 30°42′18″N 77°53′38″E

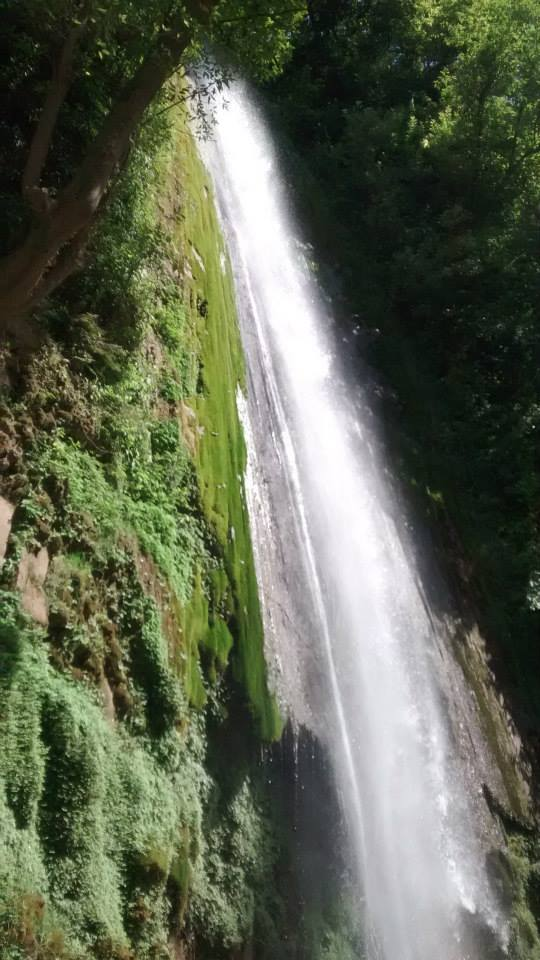
Tiger Fall

The Tiger Falls are hidden in the hilly terrains of Chakrata in Uttarakhand, India. It is 98 km from the state capital, Dehradun, 20 km from Chakrata and can be reached by a 5 km trek with rhododendron and oak trees surroundings. At an elevation of 312 ft, it is considered the highest direct waterfall in India.

== See also ==
- List of waterfalls
- List of waterfalls of India
