= Koraiyar Falls =

Waterfall in Tamil Nadu, India

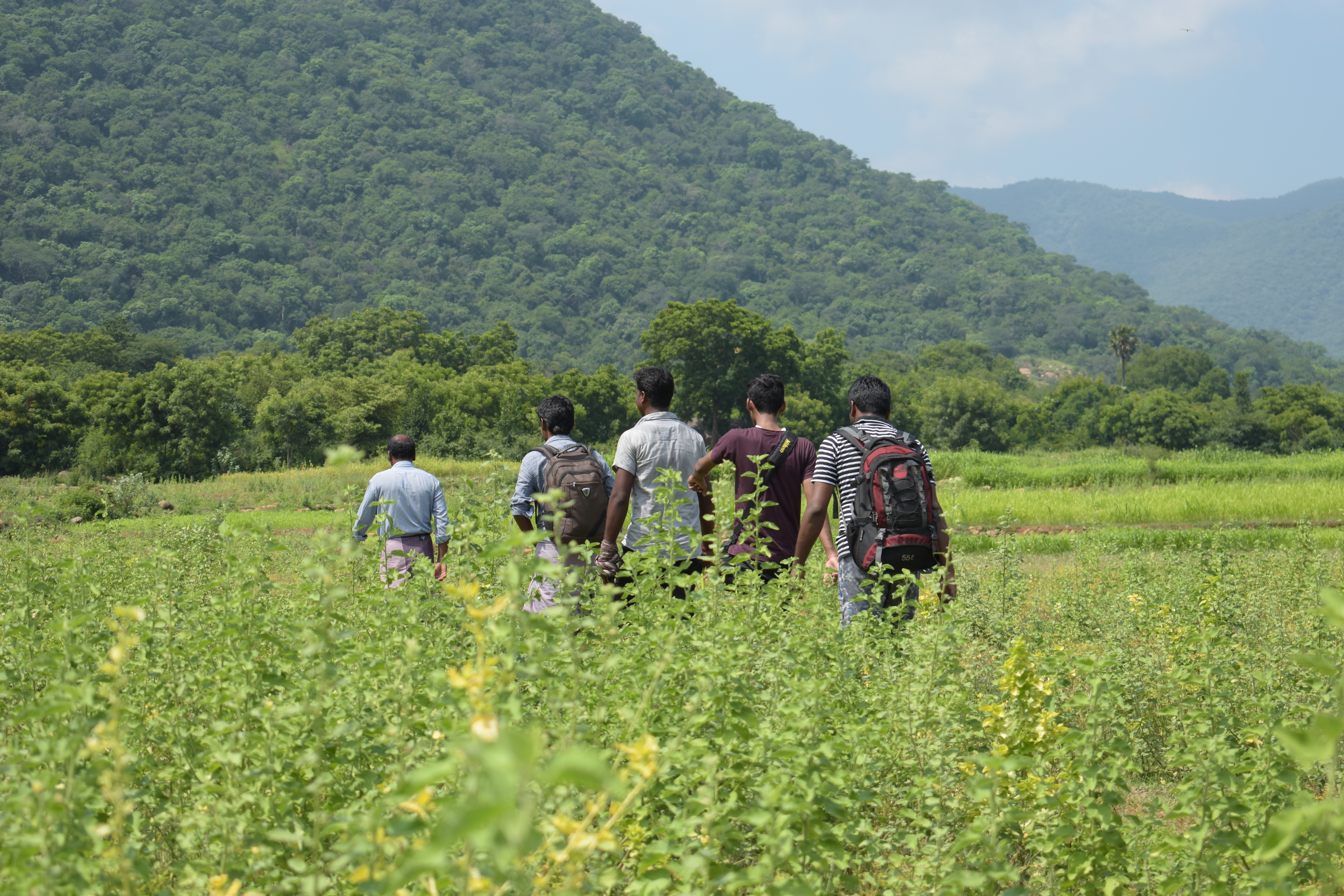

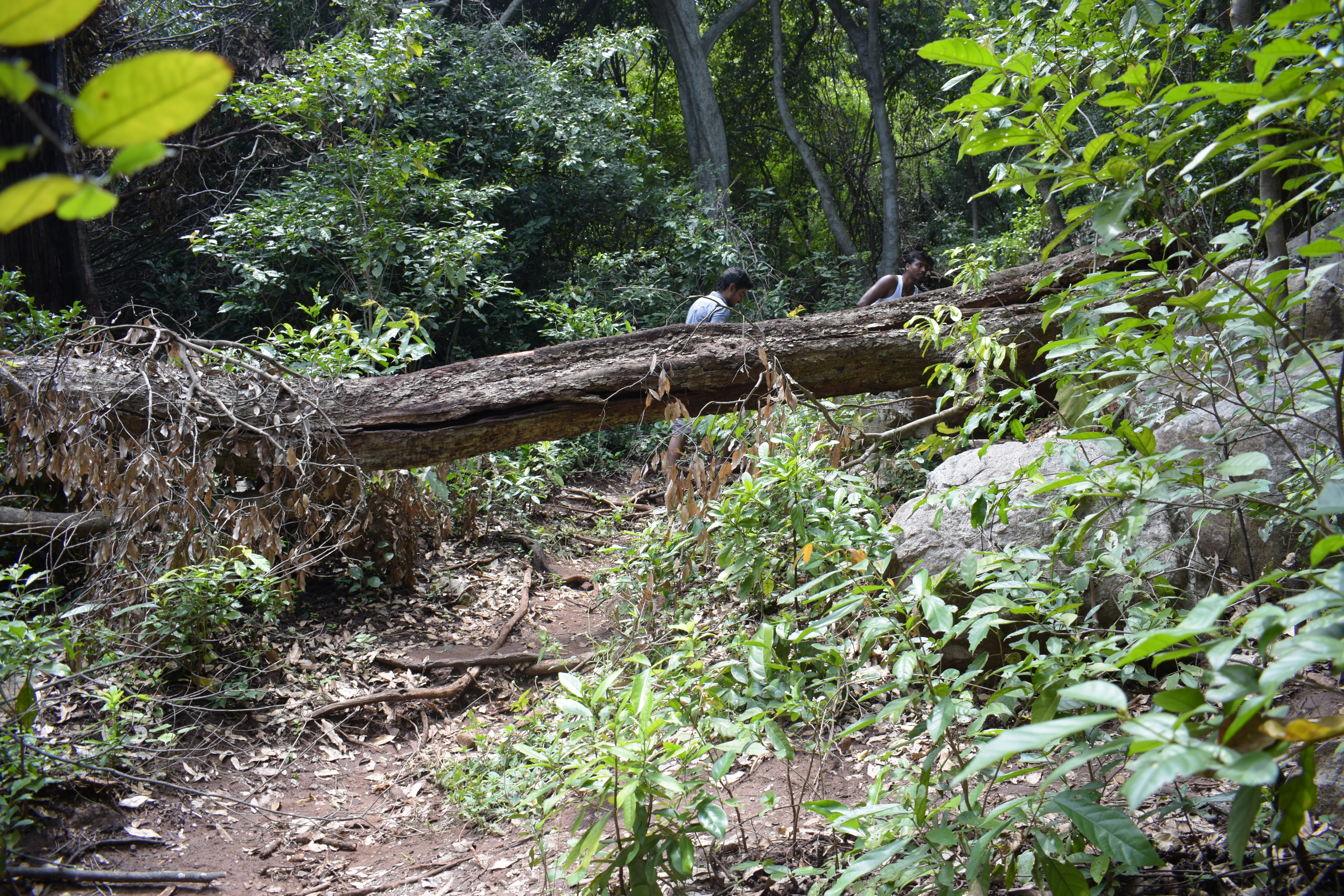

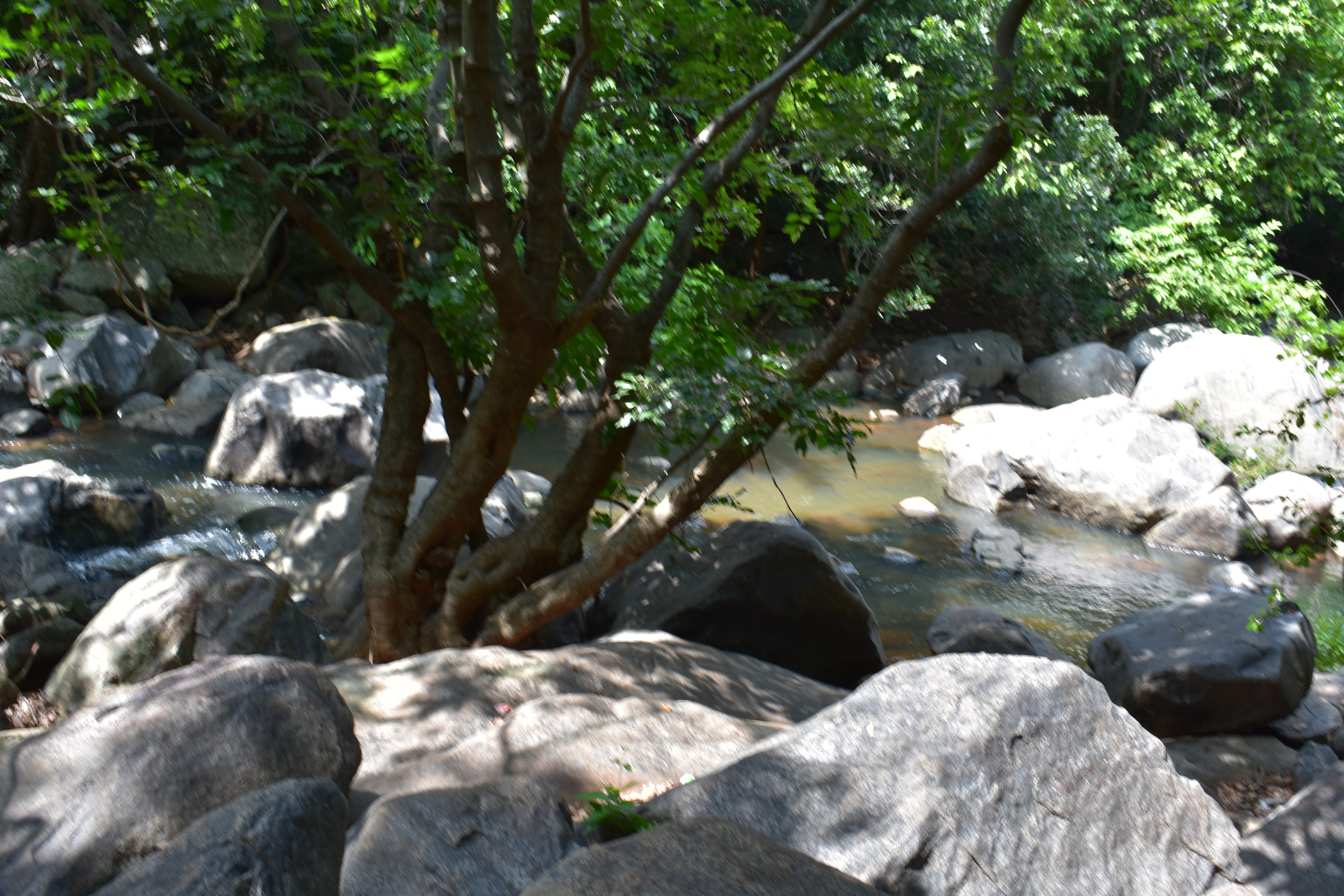

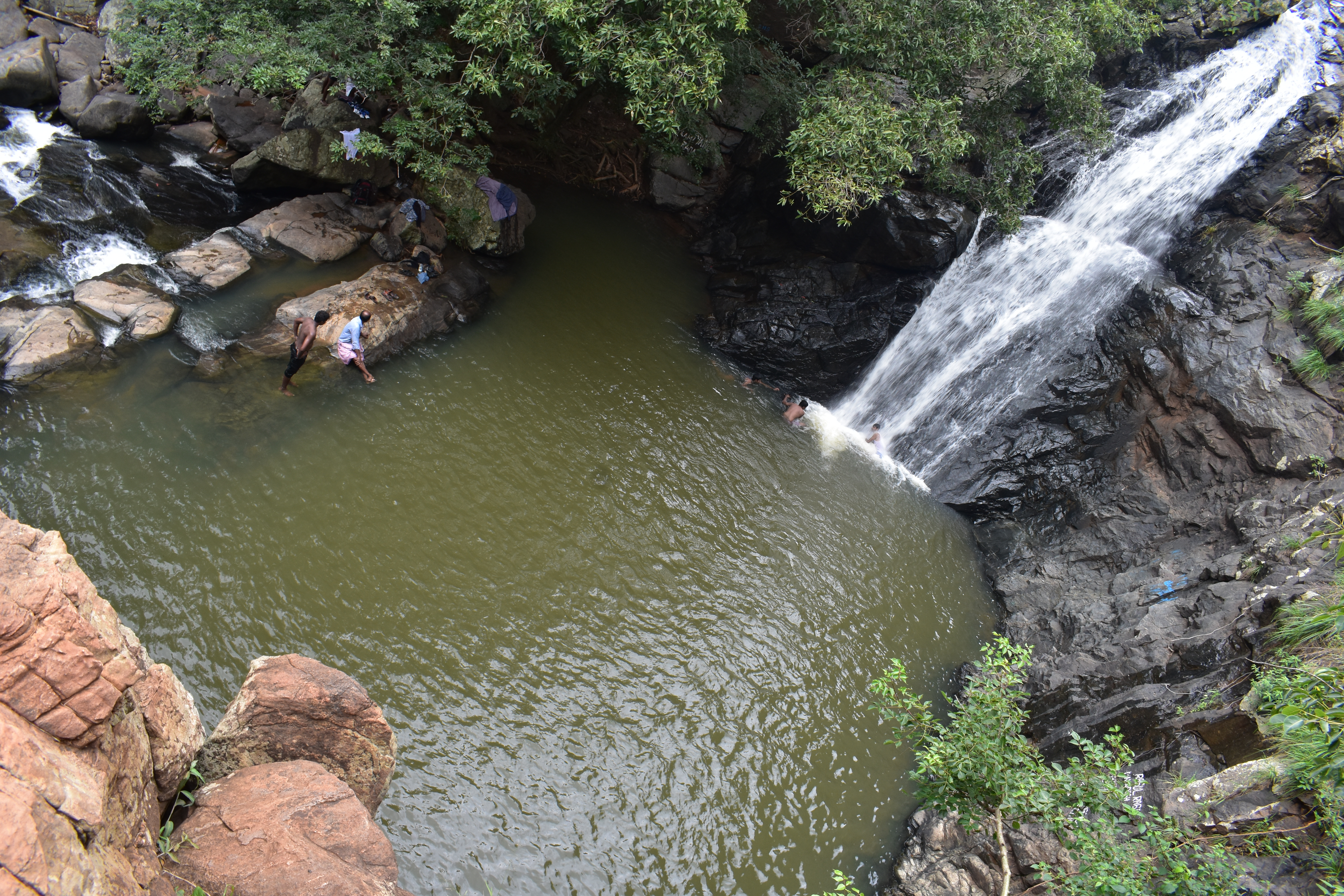
Koraiyar Falls

Koraiyar Falls (Tamil: கோரையாரு) is one of the waterfalls in Pachaimalai Hills of the Eastern Ghats, in Tiruchirappalli district, Tamil Nadu, India. It is the source of many small streams which join the Vellar River. Falls is located at a distance of 72 Km from Trichy City.

There is also a 60 feet deep water reservoir where the water falls from the top of the mountain. The smaller reservoirs are 7-8 feet deep. 2 people drowned in a natural reservoir near the waterfall on 15 June 2023.

In this stream, even a normal rainfall can cause water to overflow. Especially starting from the end of October, the months of November and December are the season days of Koriyar Falls. This rainwater flows through Koraiyar and Thondamanthurai into Kallar.

After this one has to walk for a distance of 3 kilometers crossing the river in the middle on Pacchimalai. Seeing the waterfall gushing from a height into the pool surrounded by black stone rocks will leave you in awe.

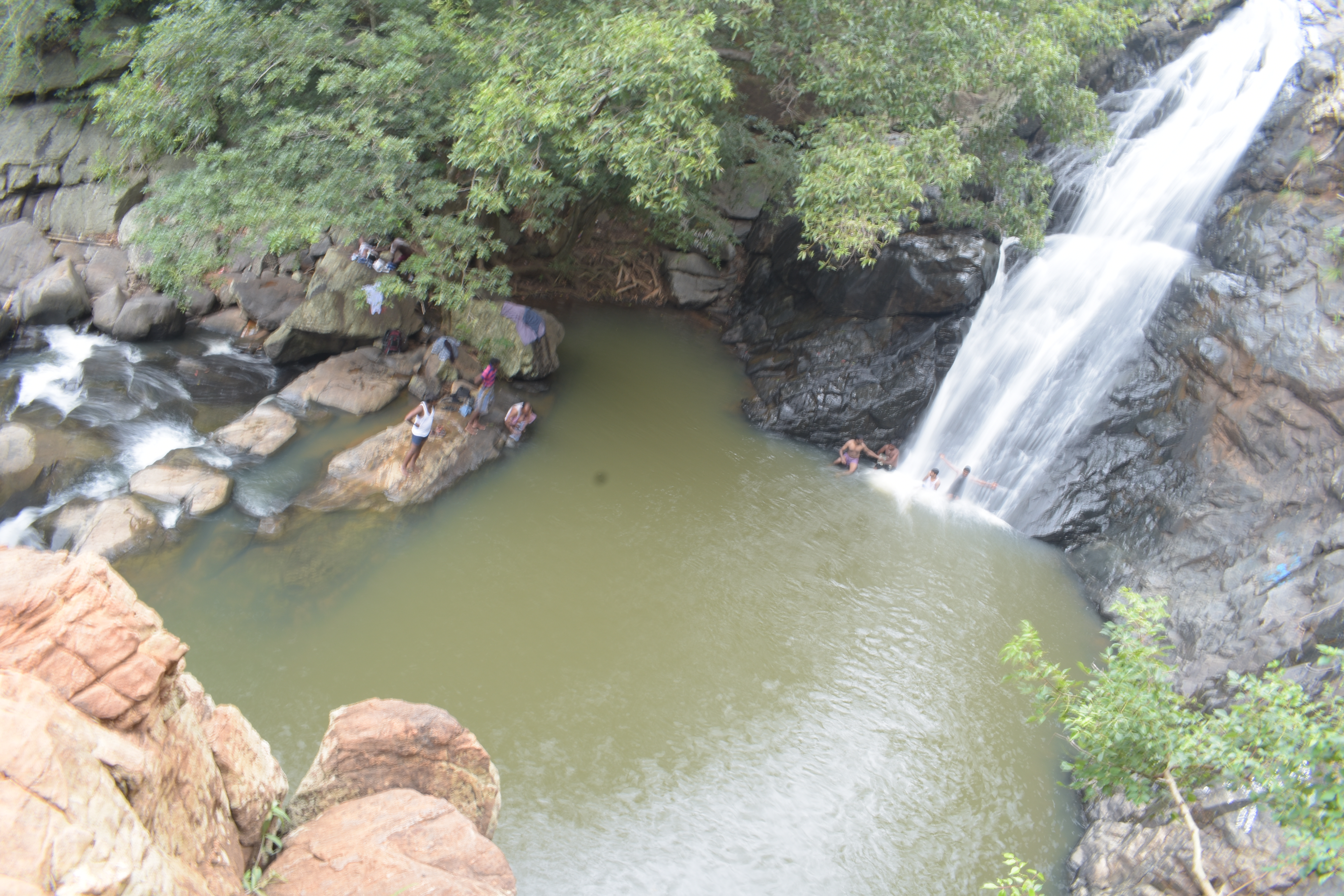

Bus route : Buses are available from Thuraiyur to Pachaimalai Hills and Perambalur to Thondamanthurai village from this village trekking starts to Koraiyaru falls. Koraiyaru is located at the foothills of Pachaimalai Hills. One has to walk through the hills path to reach the Koriyaru falls from here.

== See also ==
- List of waterfalls
- List of waterfalls in India
