= Gaur Vellaiyan Falls =

Gaur Vellaiyan Falls in Tamil Nadu, India

Gaur Vellaiyan Falls are waterfalls located in the Indian State of Tamil Nadu. These falls are 52 feet or 16 meters high, are noted for their beauty, and are found on the Kilavari Trail located near Kodaikanal. The waterfalls are considered an ideal picnic spot and high altitudinal meadows surrounding the waterfalls add to their beauty.

== See also ==
- List of waterfalls
- List of waterfalls in India
