= Siddapur, Belgaum =

Siddapur Siddapurwadi
- Village
- Location in Karnataka, India Siddapur (India)
- Coordinates: 16.61744°N 74.92916°E
- Country: India
- State: Karnataka
- District: Belgaum

Government
  - Type: Panchayat raj
  - Body: Gram panchayat

Population (2011)
  - Total: 3,651 (611 households)

Languages
  - Official: Kannada
- Time zone: UTC+5:30 (IST)
- ISO 3166 code: IN-KA
- Vehicle registration: KA
- Nearest city: Athani
- Website: karnataka.gov.in

Siddapur (also Siddapurwadi) is a mid-sized town located in the Belgaum district, Karnataka state in India about 200 metres (660 ft) south of the Krishna River.
