= Dediyapada taluka =

Coordinates: 21.6333°N 73.5833°E

Dediyapada
- Taluka
- Interactive map of Dediyapada
- Country: India
- State: Gujarat
- District: Narmada

Languages
  - Official: Gujarati, Hindi
- Time zone: UTC+5:30 (IST)
- Vehicle registration: GJ
- Website: gujaratindia.com

Dediyapada (Gujarati: ડેડીયાપાડા) is a taluka in Narmada district, Gujarat, India. This taluka is bounded by Zaghadia taluka, Sagbara taluka, Nandod taluka (Separated by Narmada river), Maharashtra state and Mandavi taluka (Surat district). Dediyapada is well connected with Ankleshwar, Rajpipla, Sagbara and Shahada by state highway.

Ninai Waterfall

Shoolpaneshwar wildlife sanctuary, Devmogra Pandori-mata temple, Ninai waterfall, Mal-Samot and Sagai (Eco tourism centre) are tourist places in Dediapada taluka.
