= Nohsngithiang Falls =

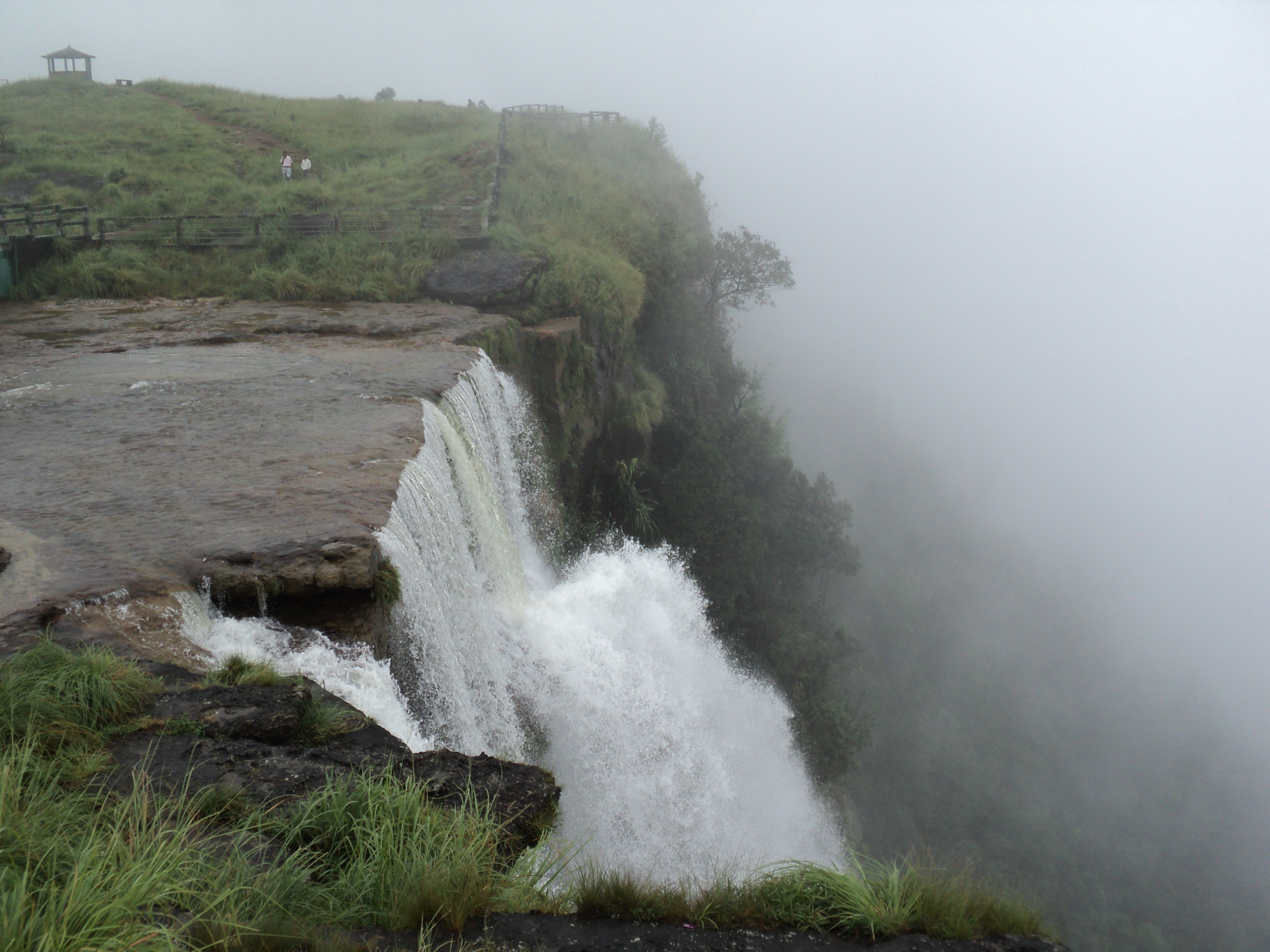
- Nohsngithiang or Seven Sisters Water Falls
- Interactive map of Nohsngithiang Falls
- Location: East Khasi Hills district, Meghalaya, India
- Coordinates: 25.243°N 91.743°E
- Type: Segmented
- Total height: 315 metres (1,033 ft)
- Number of drops: 1
- Average width: 70 metres (230 ft)

Nohsngithiang Falls (also known as the Seven Sisters Waterfalls or Mawsmai Falls) is a seven-segmented waterfall located 1 kilometre (0.62 mi) south of Mawsmai village in East Khasi Hills district in the Indian state of Meghalaya. The water falls from a height of 315 metres (1,033 ft) and has an average width of 70 metres (230 ft). making it one of the tallest waterfalls in India.

The falls plunges over the top of limestone cliffs of the Khasi Hills only during the rainy season. In full spate, the segments stretch most of the way along the cliff. The waterfalls get illuminated by the sun and the vibrant colors of the setting sun on the waterfalls makes it beautiful.

In the Sohra area, there are several waterfalls because of the heavy rainfall including Nohkalikai Falls and Dain Thlen Falls. The Jaintia Hills and the Garo Hills also have many waterfalls, notably the Tyrchi Falls en route to Jowai and the Pelga Falls near Tura.

== Gallery ==
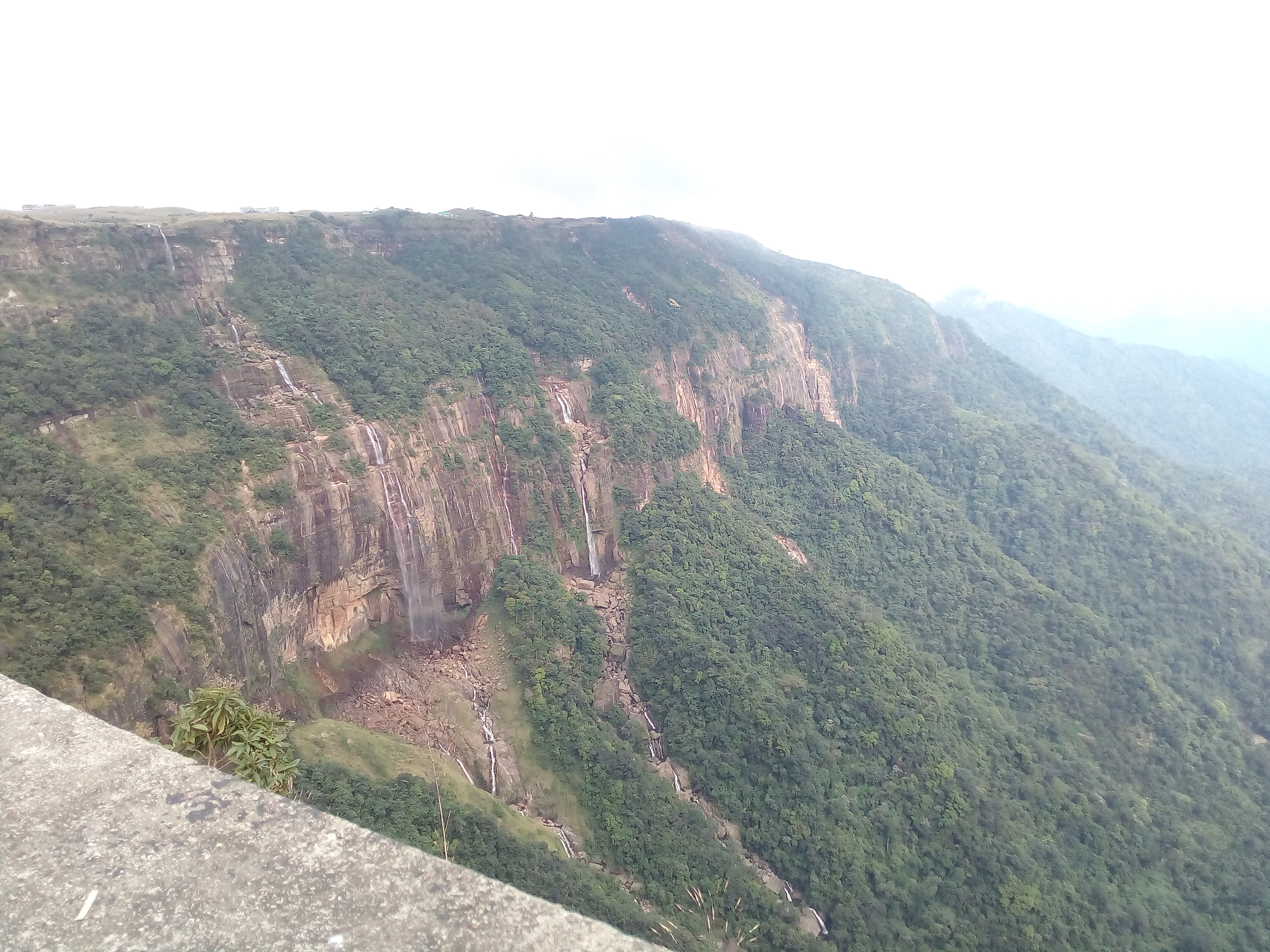

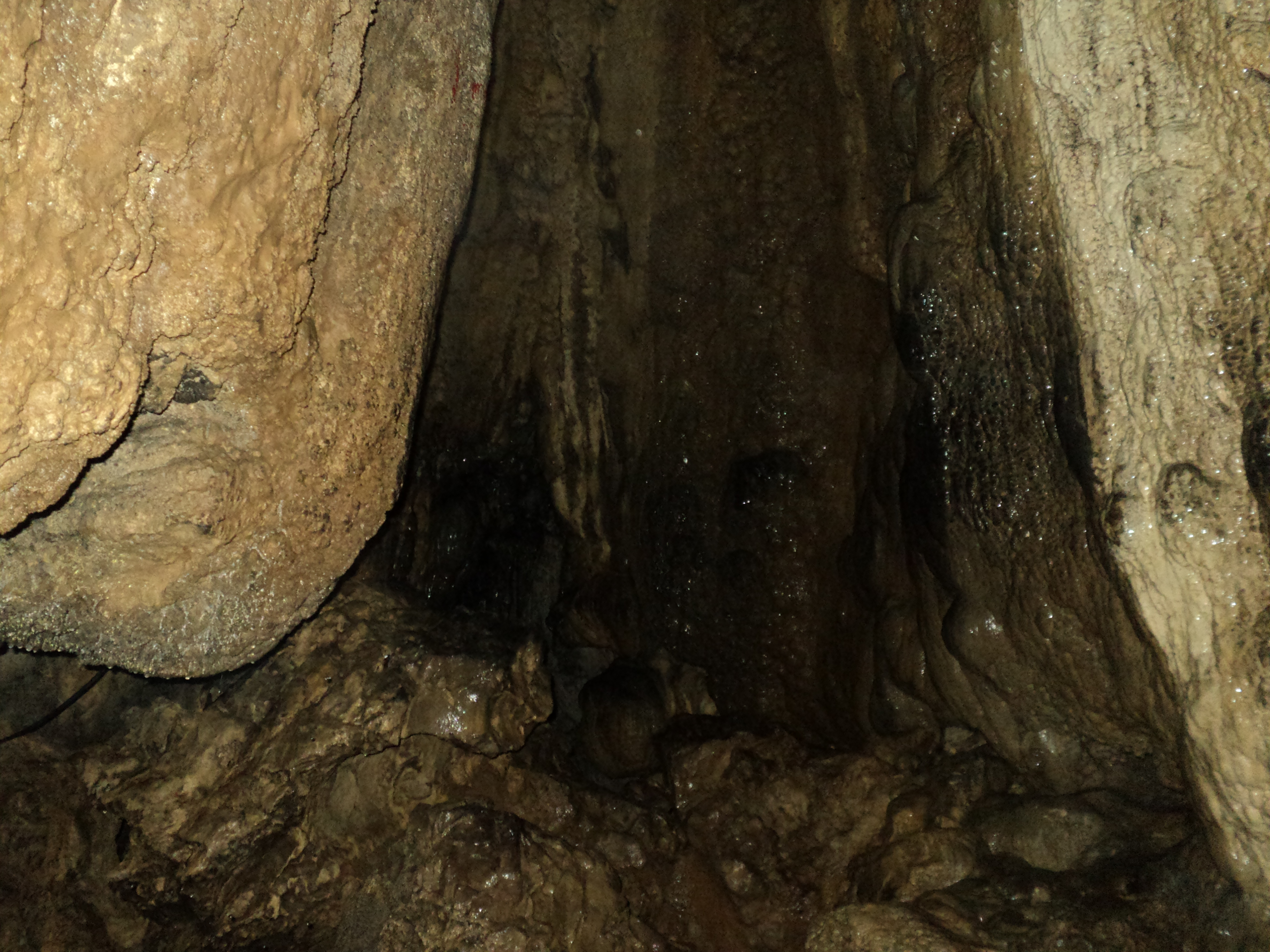
Mawsmai Cave

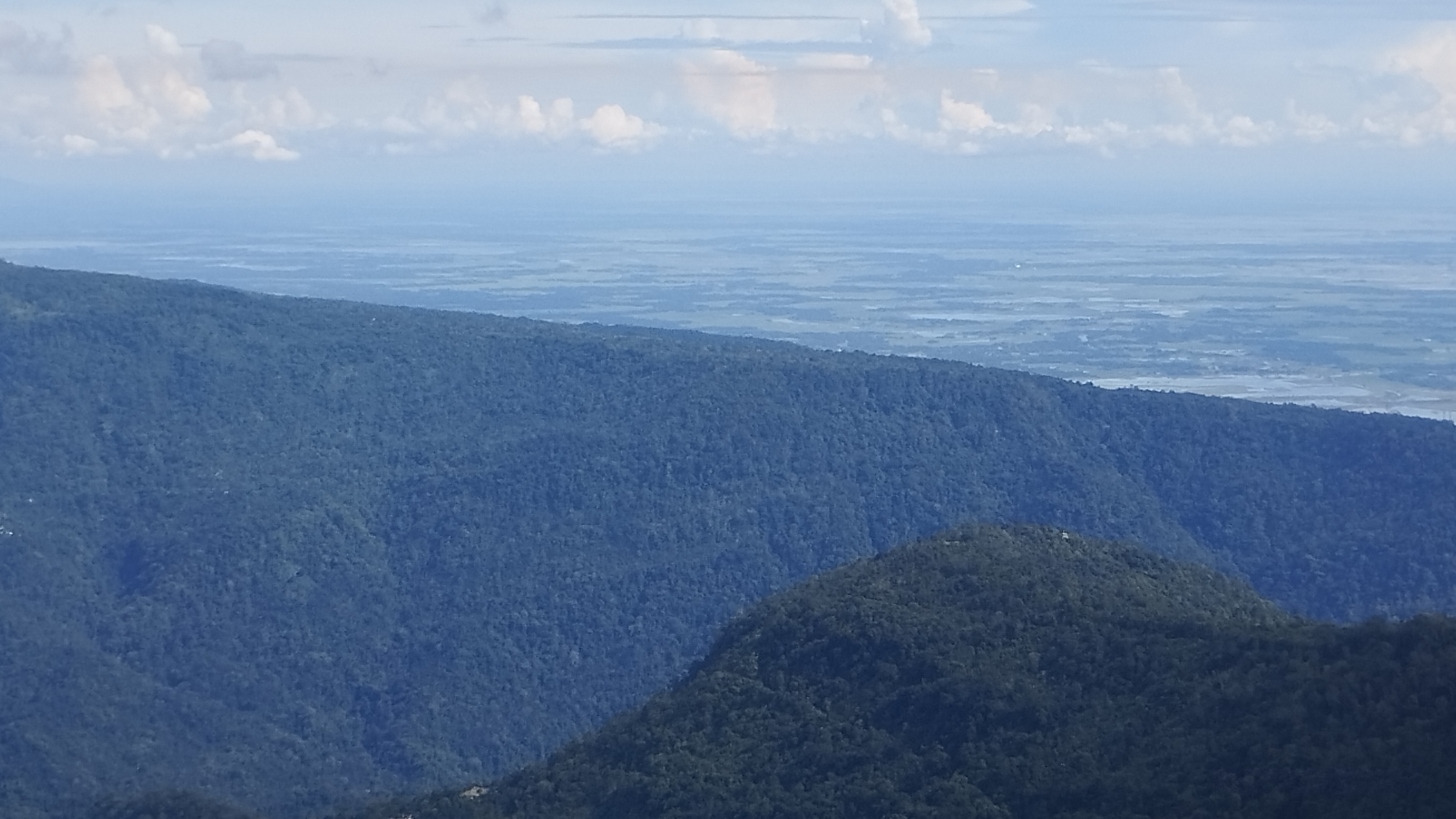
Bangladesh Plains as seen from Seven Sisters Falls view point

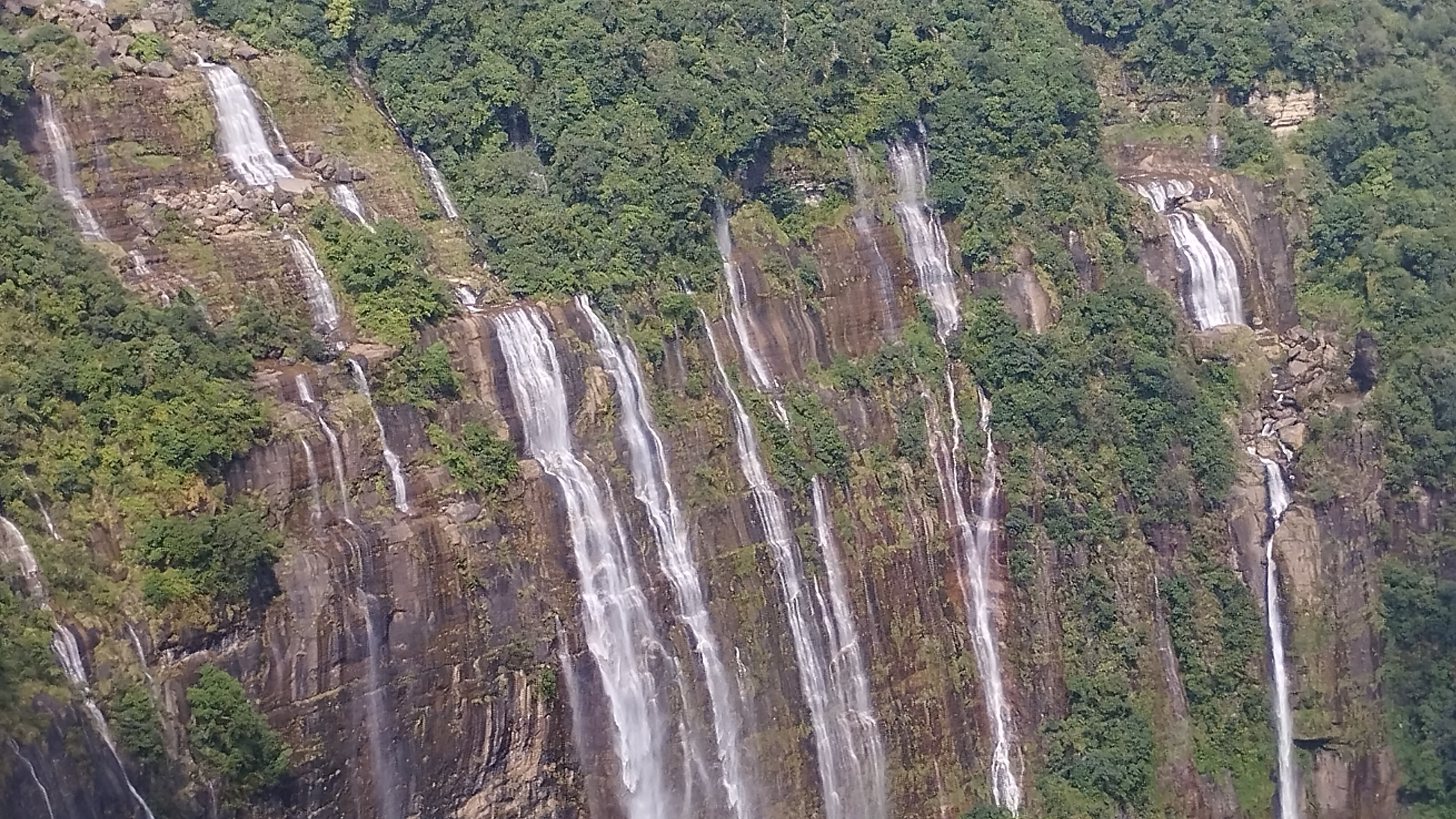
Seven Sisters Falls

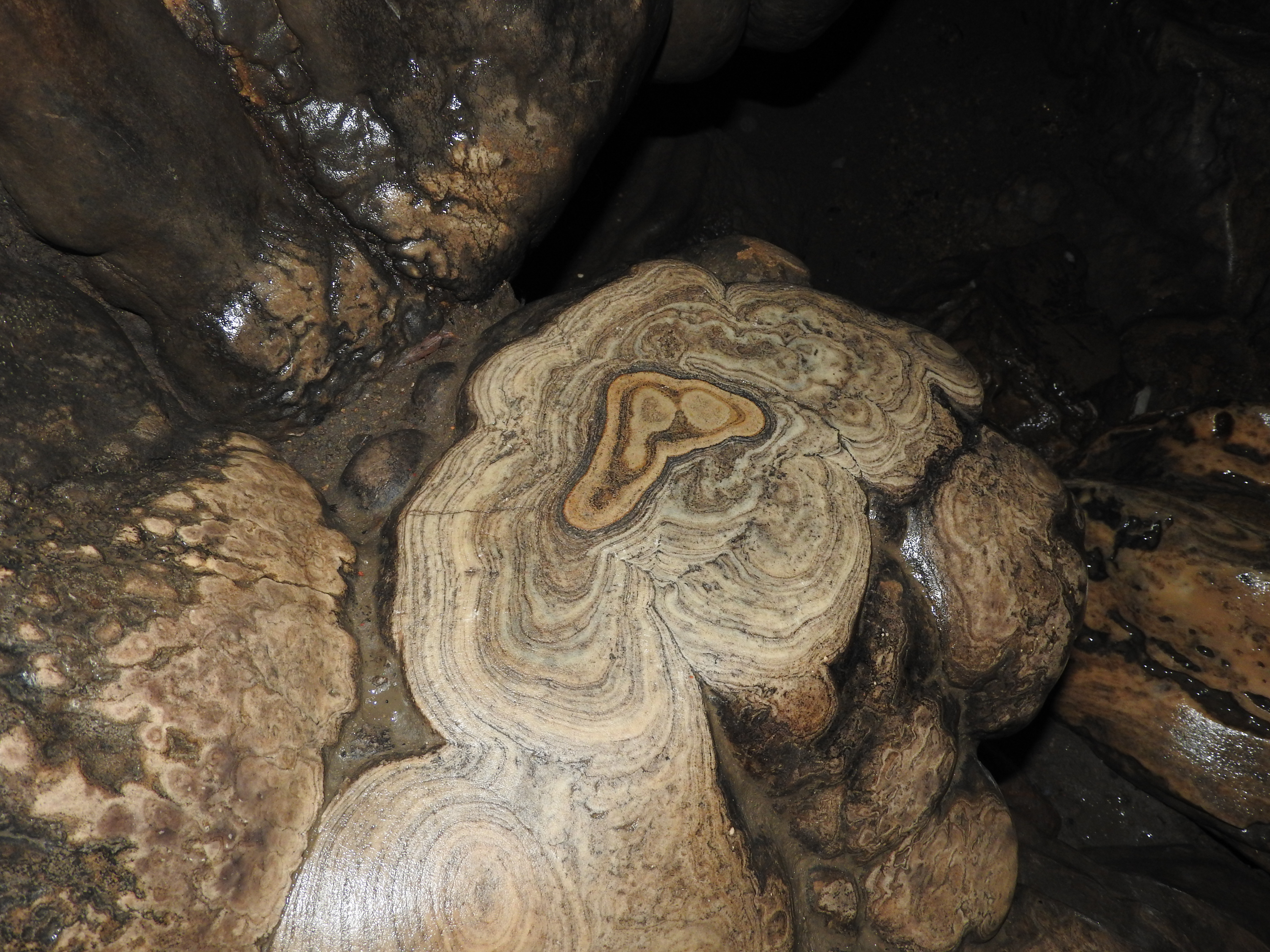
Bark like formation in Mawsmai Caves

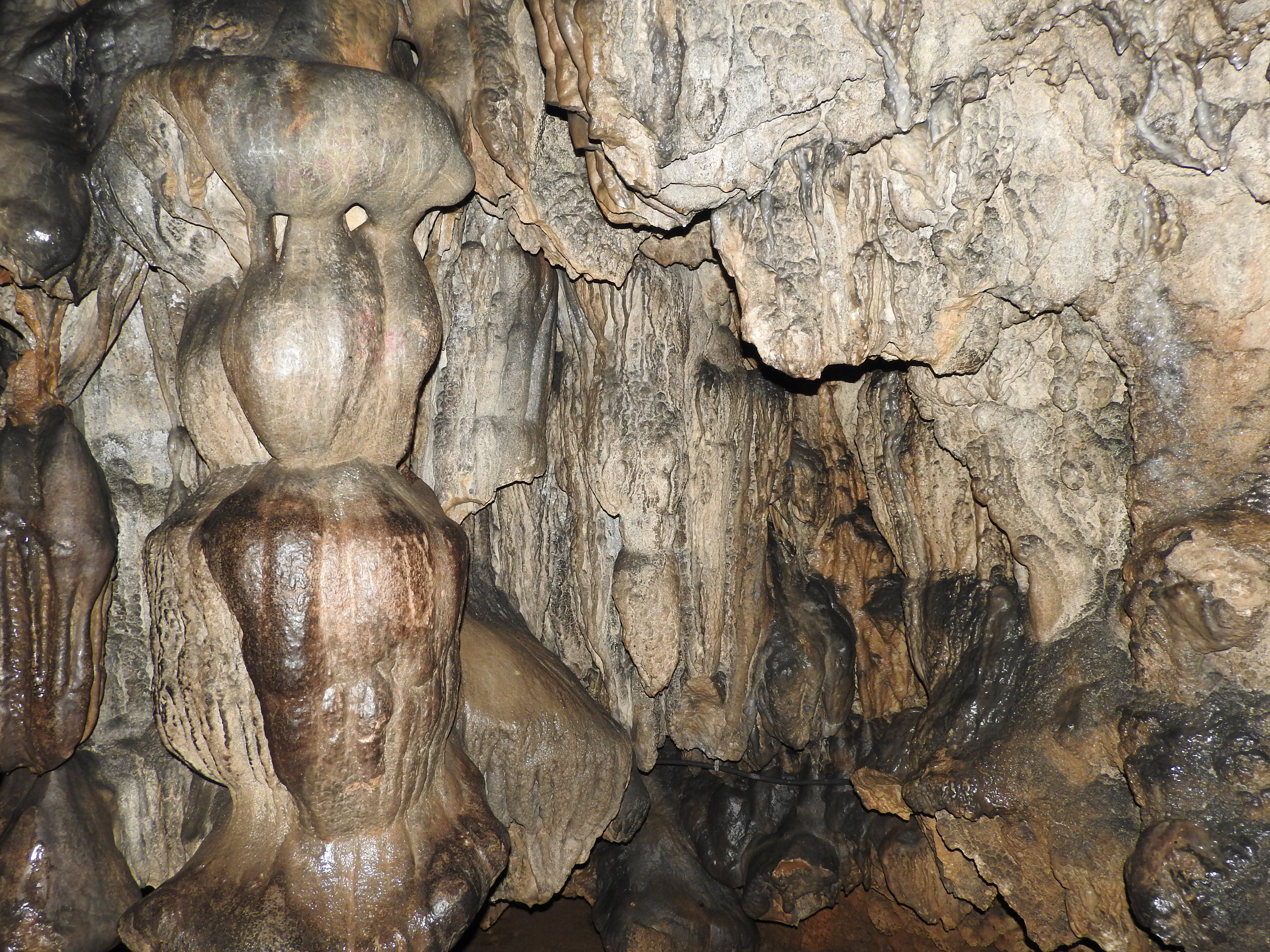
Stalactites in Mawsmai Caves

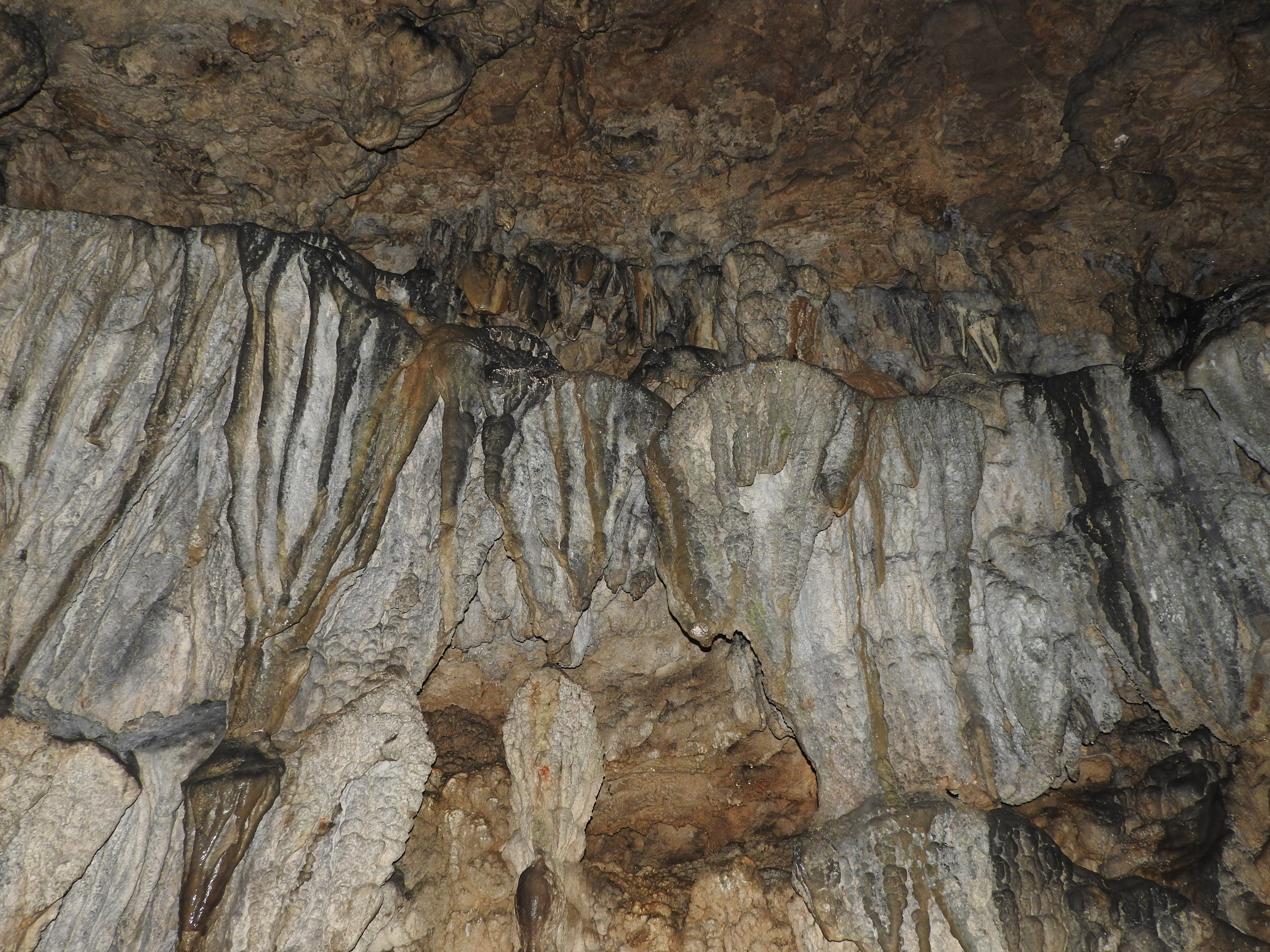
Limestone formation in Mawsmai Caves

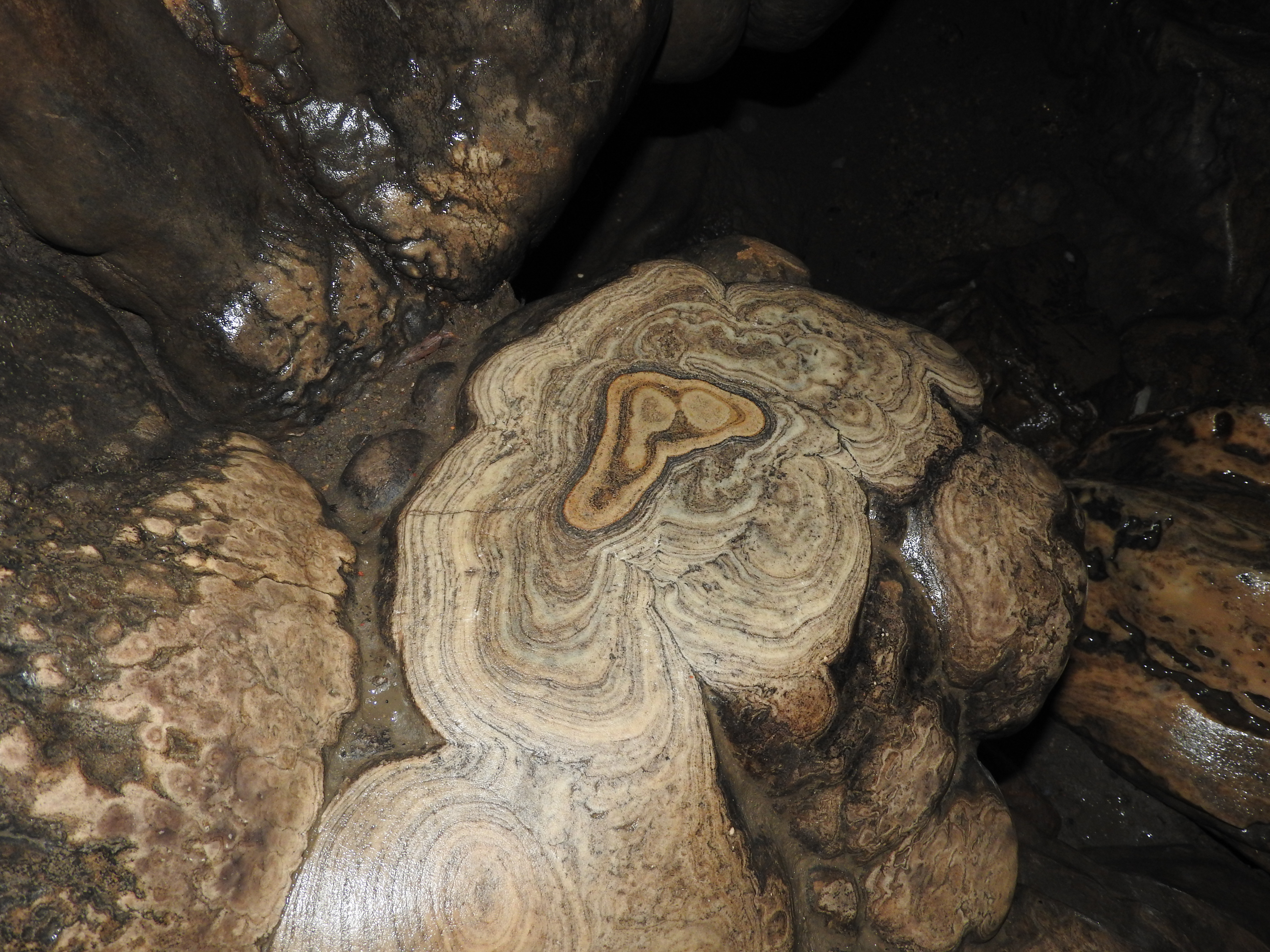
Bark like formation formed by deposition of limestone in Mawsmai Caves

== See also ==
- List of waterfalls
- List of waterfalls in India
- List of waterfalls in India by height
- Nohkalikai Falls
- Langshiang Falls
- Kynrem Falls
