= List of waterfalls in India by height =

Vajrai cannot be more than 500m as per google earth. Kas reservoir which is source of water fall is 1100 +/- 100 m from mean sea level and end point of water fall is Urmodi project which is having mean sea level height of 700 m +/- 50m. Hence, the water fall cannot be more than 500m.

The following is a list of the highest waterfalls in India. It is based on the data from World Waterfall Database. In many cases, numbers are merely estimates and measurements may be imprecise. The highest waterfall in India is Vajarai waterfall located in satara district of maharashtra.

Height-wise rank	Waterfall	Height	Location	Remarks	Number of drops
1	Vajrai Waterfall	560 meters (1840;ft)	Satara, Maharashtra	tiered waterfalls	3-
2	Kunchikal Waterfalls	455 metres (1,493 ft)	Shivamogga district, Karnataka	tallest tiered type waterfalls	4
3	Barehipani Falls	399 metres (1,309 ft)	Mayurbhanj district, Odisha	tiered	2
4	Nohkalikai Falls	340 metres (1,120 ft)	East Khasi Hills district, Meghalaya	plunge waterfalls	Single
5	Nohsngithiang Falls or Mawsmai Falls	315 metres (1,033 ft)	East Khasi Hills district, Meghalaya	segmented type waterfalls	Single
6	Dudhsagar Falls	310 metres (1,020 ft)	South Goa District, Goa	tiered waterfalls	4
7	Kynrem Falls	305 metres (1,001 ft)	East Khasi Hills district, Meghalaya	tiered waterfalls	3
8	Meenmutty Falls	300 m (984 feet)	Wayanad district, Kerala	tiered waterfalls	3
9	Thalaiyar Falls	297 metres (974 ft)	Bathalagundu - Kodaikanal Ghat Road, Dindigul district, Tamil Nadu	horsetail type waterfalls	Single
11	Jog Falls	253 metres (830 ft)	Shivamogga district, Karnataka	Plunge Fall, segmented waterfalls	Single
12	Khandadhar Falls	244 metres (801 ft)	Sundergarh district, Odisha	Horse tail type falls	Single
13	Vantawng Falls	229 metres (751 ft)	Serchhip district, Mizoram	tiered waterfalls	2
14	Kune Falls	200 metres (660 ft)	Pune district, Maharashtra	tiered waterfalls	3
15	Thoseghar Waterfalls	200 metres (660 ft)	Satara district, Maharashtra	cataract, segmented	
16	Soochipara Falls	200 metres (660 ft)	Wayanad district, Kerala	tiered waterfalls	3
17	Bahuti Falls	198 metres (650 ft)	Mauganj, Rewa district, Madhya Pradesh	tiered waterfalls	2
18	Magod Falls	198 metres (650 ft)	Uttara Kannada district, Karnataka	tiered waterfalls	2
19	Hebbe Falls	168 metres (551 ft)	Chikkamagaluru district, Karnataka	tiered waterfalls	2
20	Duduma Falls	157 metres (515 ft)	Border of Koraput & Visakhapatnam districts of Odisha and Andhra Pradesh states	plunge type waterfalls	Single
21	Palani Falls	150 metres (490 ft)	Kullu district, Himachal Pradesh		
22	Joranda Falls	150 metres (490 ft)	Mayurbhanj district, Odisha		Single
23	Lodh Falls	143 metres (469 ft)	Latehar district, Jharkhand	tiered waterfalls	2
24	Bishop Falls	135 metres (443 ft)	East Khasi Hills district, Meghalaya	tiered waterfalls	3
25	Chachai Falls	130 metres (430 ft)	Rewa district, Madhya Pradesh		
25	Keoti Falls	98 metres (322 ft)	Rewa district, Madhya Pradesh	segmented type waterfall	Single
26	Changey Falls	123 metres (404 ft)	Kalimpong district, West Bengal	segmented type waterfall	Single
27	Kalhatti Falls	122 metres (400 ft)	Chikkamagaluru district, Karnataka		
28	Beadon Falls	120 metres (390 ft)	East Khasi Hills district, Meghalaya		
29	Keppa Falls	116 metres (381 ft)	Uttara Kannada district, Karnataka	fan type waterfall	Single
30	Koosalli Falls	116 metres (381 ft)	Udupi, Karnataka	tiered waterfall	6
31	Dabbe falls	110 metres (360 ft)	Shivamogga, Sagar, Karnataka		
32	Vasudhara Falls	120 metres (390 ft)	Chamoli district, Uttarakhand		
33	Pandavgad Falls	107 metres (351 ft)	Thane, Maharashtra		
34	Rajat Prapat	107 metres (351 ft)	Narmadapuram district, Madhya Pradesh	horsetail type waterfall	Single
35	Bundla Falls	100 metres (330 ft)	Kaimur district, Bihar		Single
36	Shivanasamudra Falls	98 metres (322 ft)	Mandya district, Chamarajanagara district, Karnataka	segmented type	Single
37	Lower Ghaghri Falls	98 metres (322 ft)	Latehar district, Jharkhand		
38	Hundru Falls	98 metres (322 ft)	Ranchi district, Jharkhand	segmented type	Single
39	Sweet Falls	96 metres (315 ft)	East Khasi Hills district, Meghalaya	horsetail type	Single
40	Agaya Gangai	92 metres (302 ft)	Namakkal, Tamil Nadu	tiered waterfalls	Single
41	Palaruvi	91.5 meters (300 ft)	Kollam district		
42	Patalpani waterfall	91.5 metres (300 ft)	Mhow, Indore district, Madhya Pradesh	segmented type	Single
43	Gatha Falls	91 metres (299 ft)	Panna district, Madhya Pradesh		
44	Teerathgarh Falls	91 metres (299 ft)	Baster district, Chhattisgarh		
45	Kiliyur Falls	91 metres (299 ft)	Yercaud, Tamil Nadu	fan type waterfall	Single
46	Kedumari Falls	91 metres (299 ft)	Udupi district, Karnataka	horsetail type waterfall	Single
47	Muthyala Maduvu Falls	91 metres (299 ft)	Bangalore rural district, Karnataka		
48	Langshiang Falls	85 metres (279 ft)	West Khasi Hills district, Meghalaya		Single
49	Talakona falls	82 metres (269 ft)	Chittoor district, Andhra Pradesh		
50	Purwa Falls	70 metres (230 ft)	Rewa district, Madhya Pradesh		
51	Courtallam falls	60 meters (200 ft )	Tenkasi district		
52	Kakolat Falls	50 metres (160 ft)	Nawada district, Bihar		
53	Paglajhora Falls	35 metres (115 ft)	Darjiling district, West bengal		
54	Dhuandhar Falls	30 metres (98 ft)	Jabalpur district, Madhya Pradesh		
55	Athirappilly Falls	25 metres (82 ft)	Thrissur, Kerala	segmented type waterfall	

== See also ==
- List of waterfalls by height
- List of waterfalls in India
- List of waterfalls
