= Nohkalikai Falls =

Waterfall in Meghalaya, India

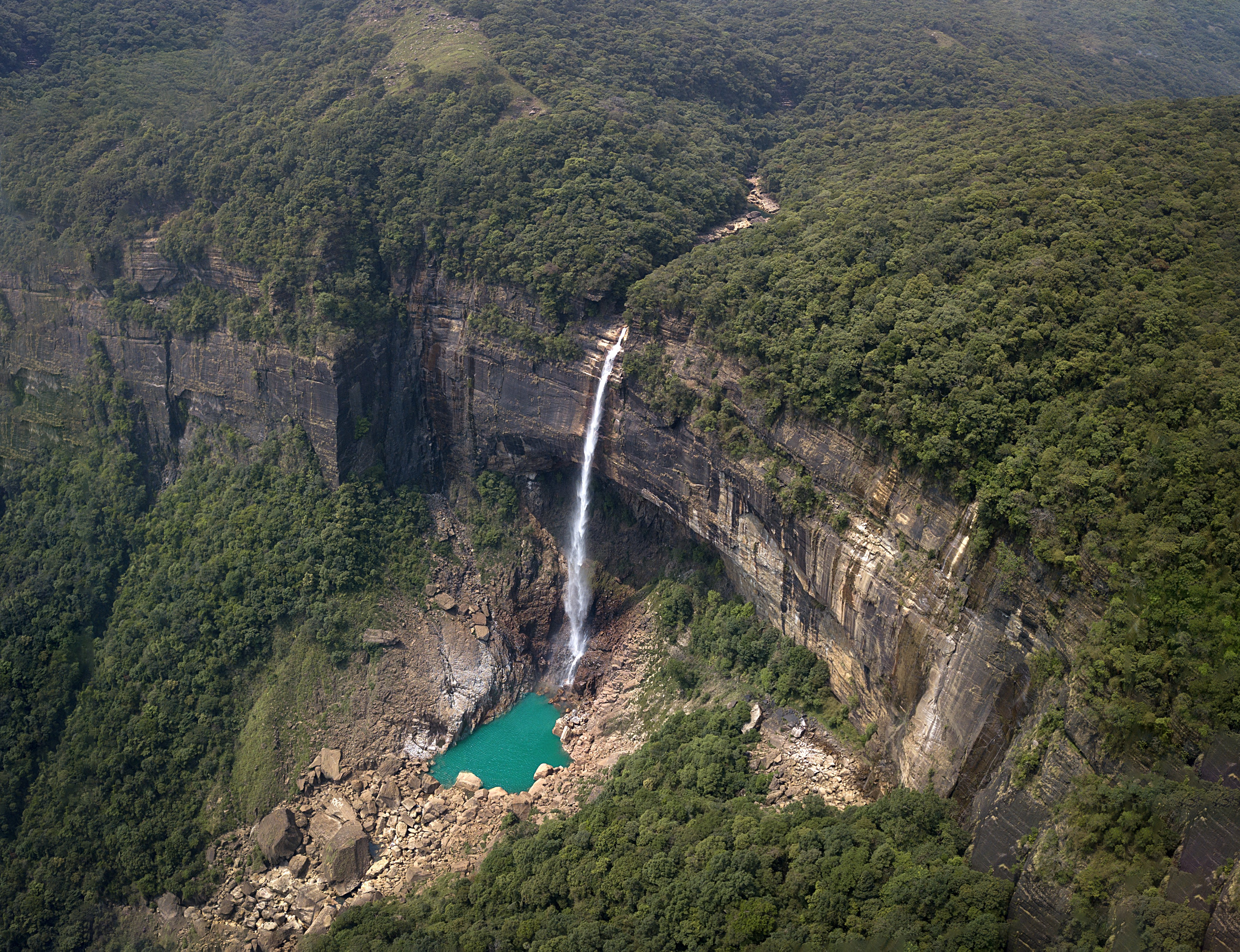
- Aerial View of NohKaLikai Falls

- Location within Meghalaya Location within India
- Location: East Khasi Hills, Meghalaya, India
- Coordinates: 25°16′32″N 91°41′12″E
- Type: Plunge
- Elevation: 4,065 ft (1,239 m)
- Total height: 1,115 ft (340 m)
- Number of drops: 1
- Longest drop: 1,115 ft (340 m)
- Total width: 75 ft (23 m)
- Average flow rate: 100 cfs (2.8 m^{3}/s)

Nohkalikai Falls, sometimes Ka Likai, is the tallest plunge waterfall in India. The 340 metres (1,115 ft) waterfall is located in the Indian state of Meghalaya, near Cherapunji (now known as Sohra), one of the wettest places on Earth. Nohkalikai Falls are fed by the rainwater collected on the summit of a comparatively small plateau and decrease in power during the dry season, from December to February. Below the falls is a plunge pool with water of an unusual shade of green.

== Legend of Nohkalikai ==
According to local legend, in a village called Rangjyrteh, upstream from Nohkalikai Falls, there lived a woman named Likai who found she had no choice but to remarry following the death of her husband. "Ka Likai" ('Ka' is the prefix for the female gender in Khasi) was left with an infant daughter and scant means of earning a living; in order to sustain herself and feed her child, she took on the arduous job of a porter. Her work required her to leave the child unattended for long periods, and what little time she could spend at home was devoted almost entirely to caring for her baby. Realising that raising a child required both parents, Ka Likai married a second time for the sake of her daughter.

However, as mother to an infant, she was obliged to give her daughter constant attention, at the expense of giving her wicked second husband the love he thought he deserved. Consumed with jealous rage, he conceived a hatred for his little stepdaughter, finally killing the infant in cold blood and cooking her flesh, after first throwing away her severed head and bones in order to hide – as he thought – all trace of the murder. When Ka Likai returned, she found the house empty, although someone had prepared a meal. She wanted to go and look for her daughter, but was so famished from her labours that she fell upon the dish of cooked meat, devouring it avidly until she could eat no more.

Ka Likai usually chewed a betel quid after her meal, but was horrified to discover a severed finger near the place where she usually prepared her betel nuts and betel leaves. Realising what had happened in her absence, she went mad with anger and grief and began to run frenziedly, all the while swinging a hatchet in her hand. She finally ran right off the edge of the plateau, plunging to her death, unable to bear any longer the thought that she had unknowingly cannibalised her murdered daughter. The waterfall from which she leaped was named Nohkalikai Falls as a grim reminder of the tragedy that had befallen the unfortunate Ka Likai.

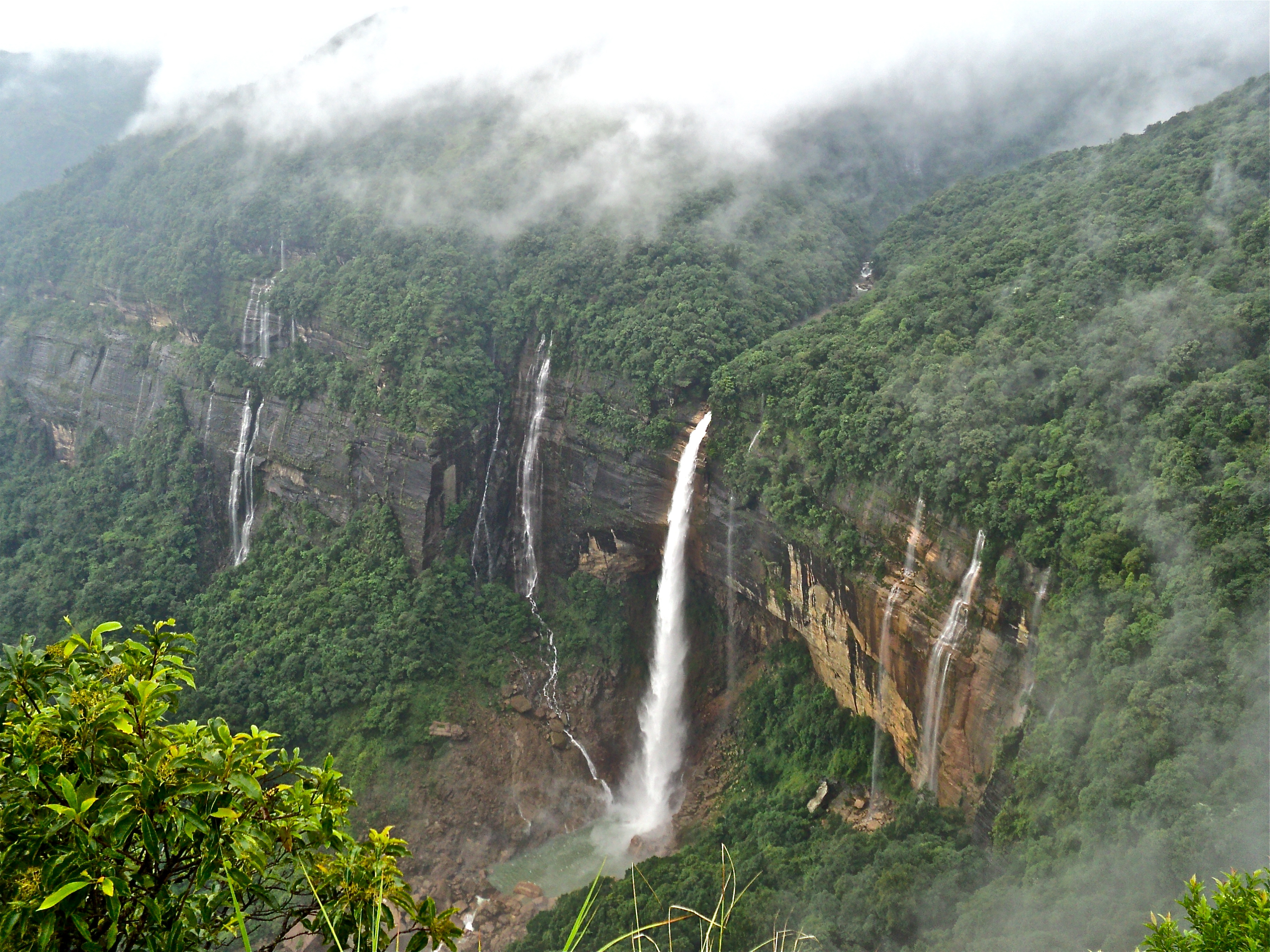
Nohkalikai Falls are located on the edge of the Cherrapunji Plateau and always fed by the rain

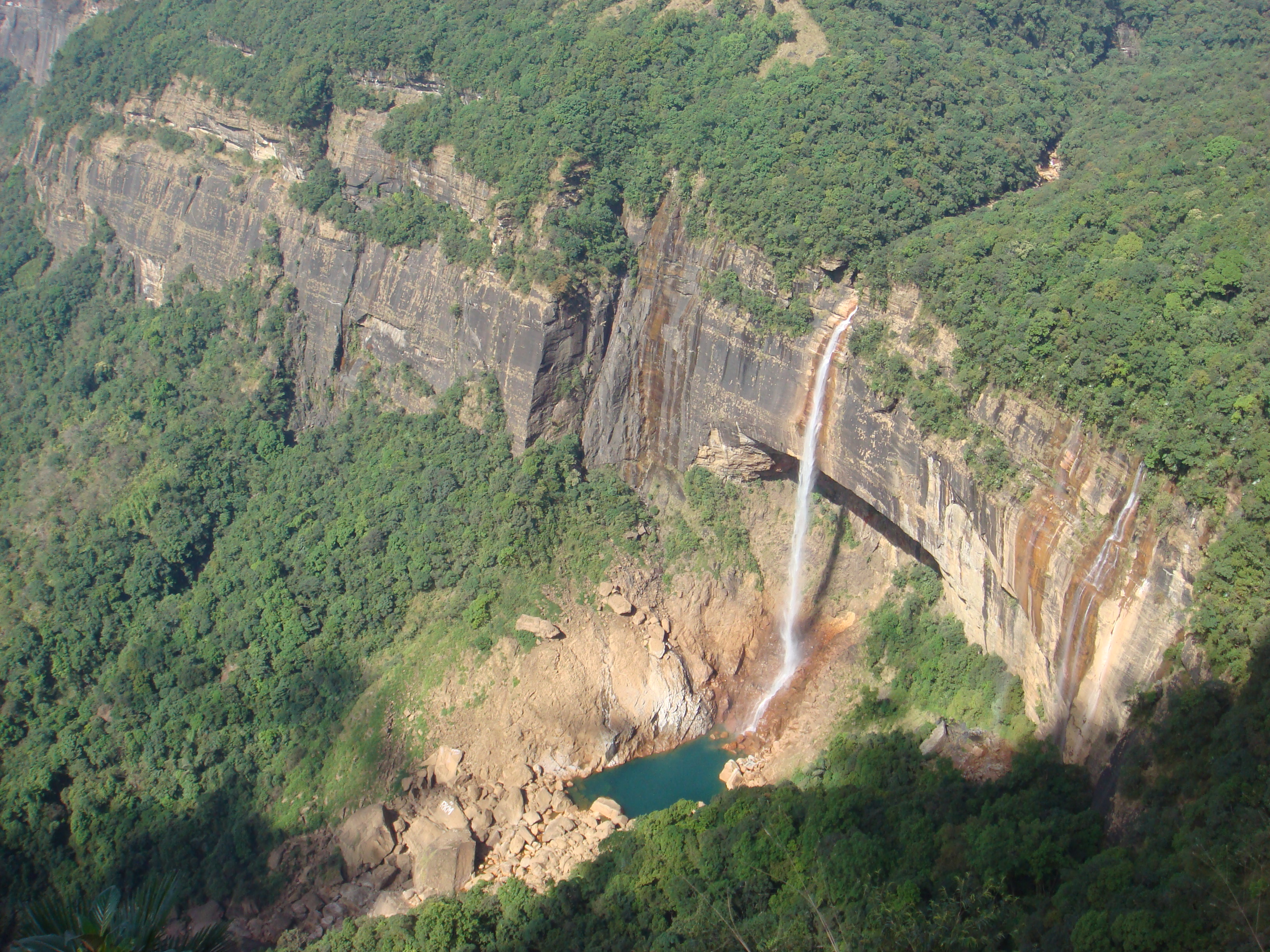
Nohkalikai Falls in the drier season

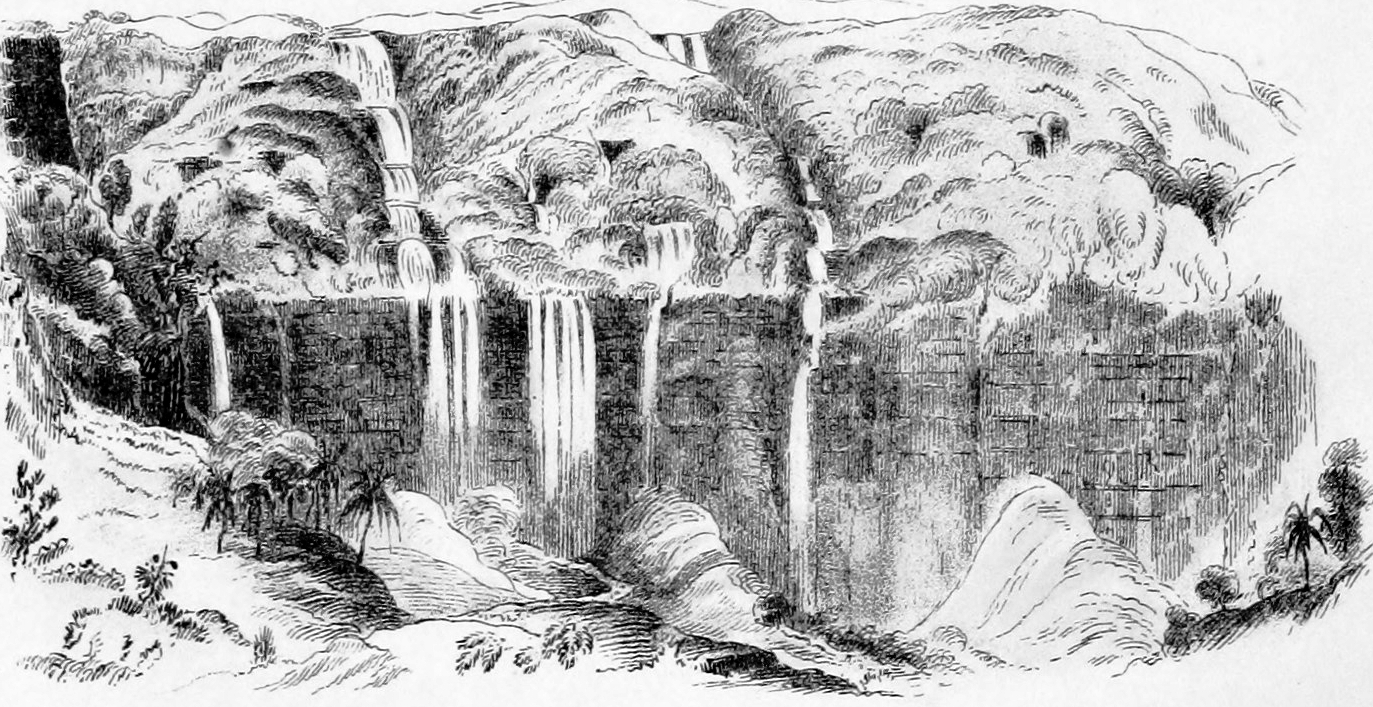
Nohkalikai Falls depicted in a painting around 1854

== See also ==
- Kynrem Falls
- List of waterfalls
- List of waterfalls in India
- List of waterfalls in India by height
- Nohsngithiang Falls
