= Lapalang =

- Village
- Location within Meghalaya Location within India
- Coordinates: 25.5660641°N 91.9181408°E
- Country: India
- State: Meghalaya
- District: East Khasi Hills
- Elevation: 111.59 m (366.1 ft)

Population (2011)
  - Total: 4,292

Language
  - Official: Khasi & English
- Time zone: UTC+5:30 (IST)
- PIN: 793006
- Vehicle registration: ML-02
- Climate: Cwa

Lapalang is a village in the East Khasi Hills district, Meghalaya, India. As per 2011 Census of India, Lapalang has a population of 4,292 people with a literacy rate of 76.47%.

There is a boys hostel of National Institute of Technology, Meghalaya, in the Lapalang village. On 10 July 2026, five people died after being overcome by toxic fumes while cleaning an underground water reservoir in the Dongmadan Lane 4 area of Lapalang, Shillong; three labourers — Pynskhemlang Mawthoh, Rapborlang Nongspung and Elka Shadap — were trapped inside the approximately 33 foot reservoir during a cleaning operation, and two neighbours, brothers Sunil Thakuri and Umesh Thakuri died after entering the reservoir in an attempt to rescue them. Officials reported that carbon monoxide fumes, believed to have been produced by a diesel pump used to drain the tank, caused the fatalities.
