= Eupithecia chlorophora =

Scientific classification
- Domain: Eukaryota
- Kingdom: Animalia
- Phylum: Arthropoda
- Class: Insecta
- Order: Lepidoptera
- Family: Geometridae
- Genus: Eupithecia
- Species: E. chlorophora

Binomial name
- Eupithecia chlorophora C. Swinhoe, 1895

Species of moth

Eupithecia chlorophora is a moth in the family Geometridae first described by Charles Swinhoe in 1895. It is found in northeast India's Khasi Hills.
