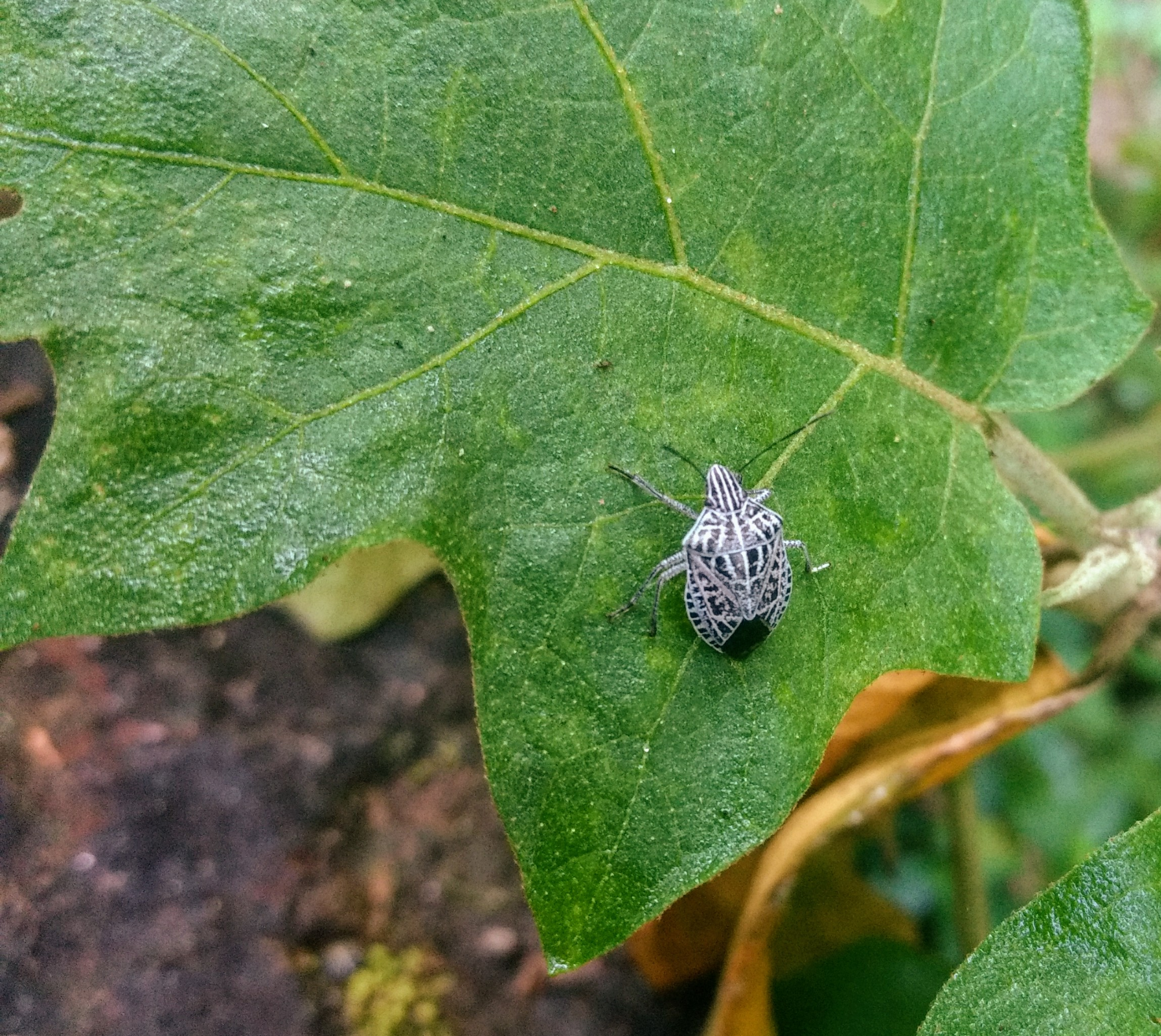

Scientific classification
- Kingdom: Animalia
- Phylum: Arthropoda
- Class: Insecta
- Order: Hemiptera
- Suborder: Heteroptera
- Family: Pentatomidae
- Genus: Cappaea
- Species: C. taprobanensis

Binomial name
- Cappaea taprobanensis (Dallas, 1851)

= Cappaea taprobanensis =

Species of true bug

Cappaea taprobanensis is a species of insect belonging to the family Pentatomidae

== Description ==
It is a medium sized black insect with ochraceous markings. These plant feeding insects are gregarious in habit. They can be observed in trunks and barks of trees.

== Range ==
This species can be found in Sikkim, the Khasi Hills, South India, Sri Lanka, Java and Sumatra.
