= Babu Jeebon Roy Mairom =

Babu Jeebon Roy (born 1838 in Saitsohpen, Sohra, India) was an Indian government servant; he is known as the "Father of Modern Khasis".

He was the eldest son of Ram Sing Jaid Rani and his second wife, Bijan Laitkynsew Jaid Mairom. He had a brother Bon Roy and a sister, Tiewbon.

Babu Jeebon Roy is known as the "Father of Modern Khasis" for his contribution to Khasi language, literature, linguistics, entrepreneurship and education. He was a government servant working for the East India Company. He later resigned his job as a government servant and worked in limestone mining. He became the first Khasi to develop mines, having leased limestone quarries in Mynteng Nongjri of present-day Shella. He established the first high school in Khasi – Jaintia Hills in the year 1880 in Shillong, now known as the Shillong Government Boys Higher Secondary School and had set up the first printing press in the Hills there called the ‘Ri Khasi Press’ in Umsohsun, Shillong in 1896. He also authored books such as Ka Niam Jong Ki Khasi (The Religion of the Khasis).
