= Laitkor Lumheh =

Village in East Khasi Hills district, Meghalaya, India

- Village
- Location within Meghalaya Location within India
- Coordinates: 25.5197°N 91.8900°E
- Country: India
- State: Meghalaya
- District: East Khasi Hills
- Elevation: 190.95 m (626.5 ft)

Population (2011)
  - Total: 4,146

Language
  - Official: Khasi & English
- Time zone: UTC+5:30 (IST)
- PIN: 793010
- Climate: Cwa

Laitkor Lumheh is a village located in the East Khasi Hills district, Meghalaya, India. As per 2011 Census of India, Laitkor Lumheh has a population of 4,146 people with a literacy rate of 87.42%.
