= Pandavkada Falls =

Pandu Falls
- Kharghar Falls
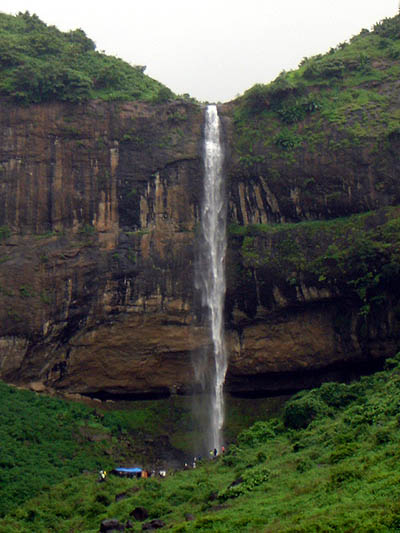
- Pandavkada Falls, Kharghar, Navi Mumbai

- Location within Mumbai
- Location: Kharghar, Navi Mumbai, Raigad, India
- Coordinates: 19°03′24″N 73°03′47″E
- Type: Plunge
- Total height: 107 metres (351 ft)

Pandavkada Falls is a waterfall located Kharghar, a suburb of Navi Mumbai. The waterfall, about 107 metres high is a type of 'plunge' waterfall in nature pouring in massive amounts of water on the rocky surface underneath.

== History ==
Pandavkada is said to have derived its name from the Pandavas, who had once visited the place and took bath below the falls when they were exiled in the forests as per Hindu traditional legends. And within pandavkada is a big tunnel from where pandavas had come, that's why it is known as pandavkada.

== Location ==
Pandavkada Waterfalls is located in the Kharghar node of Navi Mumbai, Maharashtra. The waterfall is approximately 4.5 kilometers from Kharghar Railway Station and is accessible via local buses, auto-rickshaws, or private vehicles. The site is a popular monsoon destination, with access generally requiring a short walk or trek from the nearest road point.

== Bathing ==
Pandavkada waterfall is being declared as a dangerous spot by the CIDCO. In 2010, about 12 students had lost their lives while swimming in the waterfall. Previously, a ban was imposed from entering the fall, after four students drowned in the waterfall in 2005 which was lifted long ago by the forest department and in 2019, 4 students have also lost their lives. However, according to officials of Kharghar police station, tourists are Charged Rs.50/person to visit the spot as per their wish but on their own risk.

== See also ==
- List of waterfalls
- List of waterfalls in India
- List of waterfalls in India by height
