= Rajat Prapat =

Rajat Prapat Silver Falls
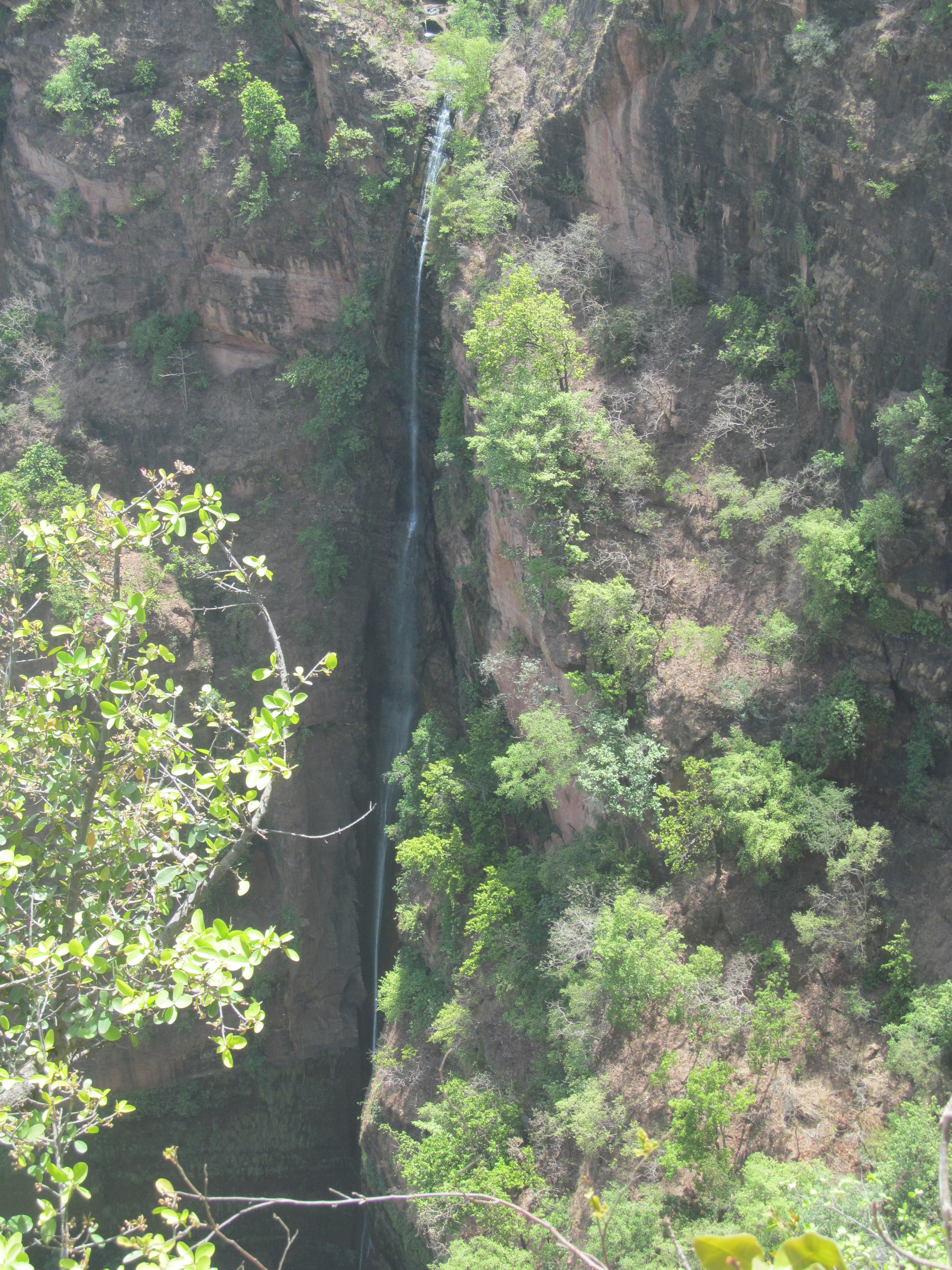
- 107m high Silver Fall in Narmadapuram district, India
- Interactive map of Rajat Prapat; Silver Falls
- Location: Narmadapuram district, Madhya Pradesh, India
- Coordinates: 22.452°N 78.445°E
- Type: Horsetail
- Total height: 107 metres (351 ft)
- Number of drops: 1
- Watercourse: Not known

The Rajat Prapat is a waterfall in Narmadapuram district in the Indian state of Madhya Pradesh. It is the 30th highest waterfall in India.

== The falls ==
It is a horsetail type waterfall with a single drop of 107 metres (351 ft).

== Etymology ==
When sunlight falls on it, it shines as silver, that is why it is known as Rajat Prapat or Silver Fall. In Hindi, ‘rajat’ means silver and ‘prapat’ means falls.

== Location ==
The Rajat Prapat is located at Pachmarhi, known as the Queen of Satpura, in Narmadapuram district. It is 10 min walk over rocks and boulders from Apsara Vihar.

== See also ==
- List of waterfalls
- List of waterfalls in India
- List of waterfalls in India by height
- Pachmarhi travel guide from Wikivoyage
