= Bishop Falls (India) =

- Interactive map of Bishop Falls
- Location: Shillong, Meghalaya, India
- Coordinates: 25.584°N 91.864°E
- Type: 3-tiered
- Total height: 135 metres (443 ft)
- Watercourse: tributary of the Umiam River

The Bishop Falls is located in Shillong, in the Indian state of Meghalaya. It is the 22nd highest waterfalls in India.

== The falls ==
The Bishop Falls is a three-tiered waterfall with a height of 135 metres (443 ft). The Bishop' Falls is often referred to as the twin brother of the Beadon Falls since both tumble down the same escarpment into a yawning gorge. Beadon Falls and Bishop Falls are off the NH 40 at Mawprem. A narrow road at Mawlai takes one to a view point from where both the falls can be seen together.

== See also ==
- List of waterfalls
- List of waterfalls in India
- List of waterfalls in India by height
