= Kune Falls =

Coordinates: 18°45′45″N 73°22′53″E

- Interactive map of Kune Falls
- Location: Pune district, Maharashtra, India
- Type: Tiered
- Total height: 200 metres (660 ft)
- Number of drops: 3
- Longest drop: 100 metres (330 ft)

The Kune Falls is a waterfall at Khandala in Pune district in the Indian state of Maharashtra. It is the 14th highest waterfall in India.

== The falls ==
Kune Falls, located centrally within the Lonavala Khandala valley is a three tiered waterfalls with a total height of 200 metres (660 ft); the highest drop being 100 metres (330 ft).

== See also ==
- List of waterfalls
- List of waterfalls in India
- List of waterfalls in India by height
