= Kynrem Falls =

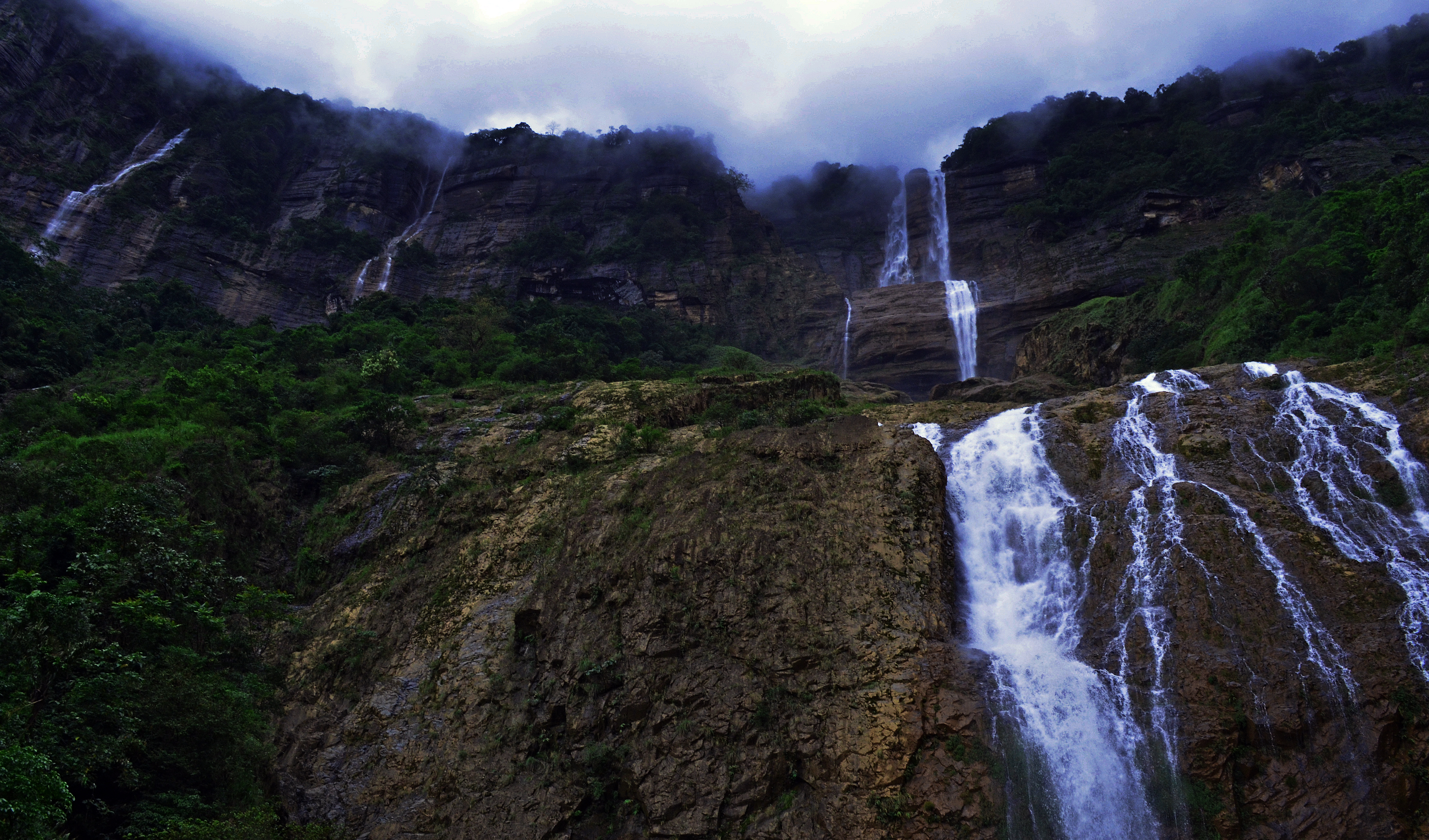
- Kynrem waterfall with its three tiers falls
- Interactive map of Kynrem Falls
- Location: East Khasi Hills district, Meghalaya, India
- Coordinates: 25.227°N 91.716°E
- Type: Tiered
- Total height: 305 metres (1,001 ft)

The Kynrem Falls is located 12 kilometres (7.5 mi) from Cherrapunji in East Khasi Hills district in the Indian state of Meghalaya. It is situated inside the Thangkharang Park. It is the 7th highest waterfalls in India. The Kynrem Falls is a three-tiered waterfall, with water falling from a height of 305 metres (1,001 ft). The fall spreads out in two different streams or rivulets with each of them gaining momentum by getting merged while flowing down the last leg of the third tier.

== See also ==
- List of waterfalls
- List of waterfalls in India
- List of waterfalls in India by height
