= Sweet Falls =

- Interactive map of Sweet Falls
- Location: East Khasi Hills, Meghalaya, India
- Coordinates: 25°33′40″N 91°57′31″E
- Type: Plunge
- Total height: 96 metres (315 ft)
- Number of drops: 1

Sweet Falls (also called Kshaid Weitden, in the native dialect) is a waterfall near Shillong in Meghalaya, India. It lies about 5 km from Happy Valley and is about 96 metres (315 ft) in height. It is often termed as the "most beautiful" yet "most dangerous" waterfall in Shillong.

The destination is accessible via road. However, tourists are prohibited to go close to the waterfall due to the poor route and treacherous nature of the fall.

The adjacent areas are filled with pine trees. Some of the plant species include Eupatorium, Lantana, Rubus, fern-Osmundastrum cinnamomeum and Phegopteris.

== Deaths ==
It is believed by the local people that this fall is haunted. If people go in odd number, they return in even number. The waterfall has also been the subject of numerous suicides and is infamous for many deaths.

== See also ==
- List of waterfalls
- List of waterfalls in India
