= East Khasi Hills district =

Coordinates: 25.5667°N 91.8833°E

- District of Meghalaya
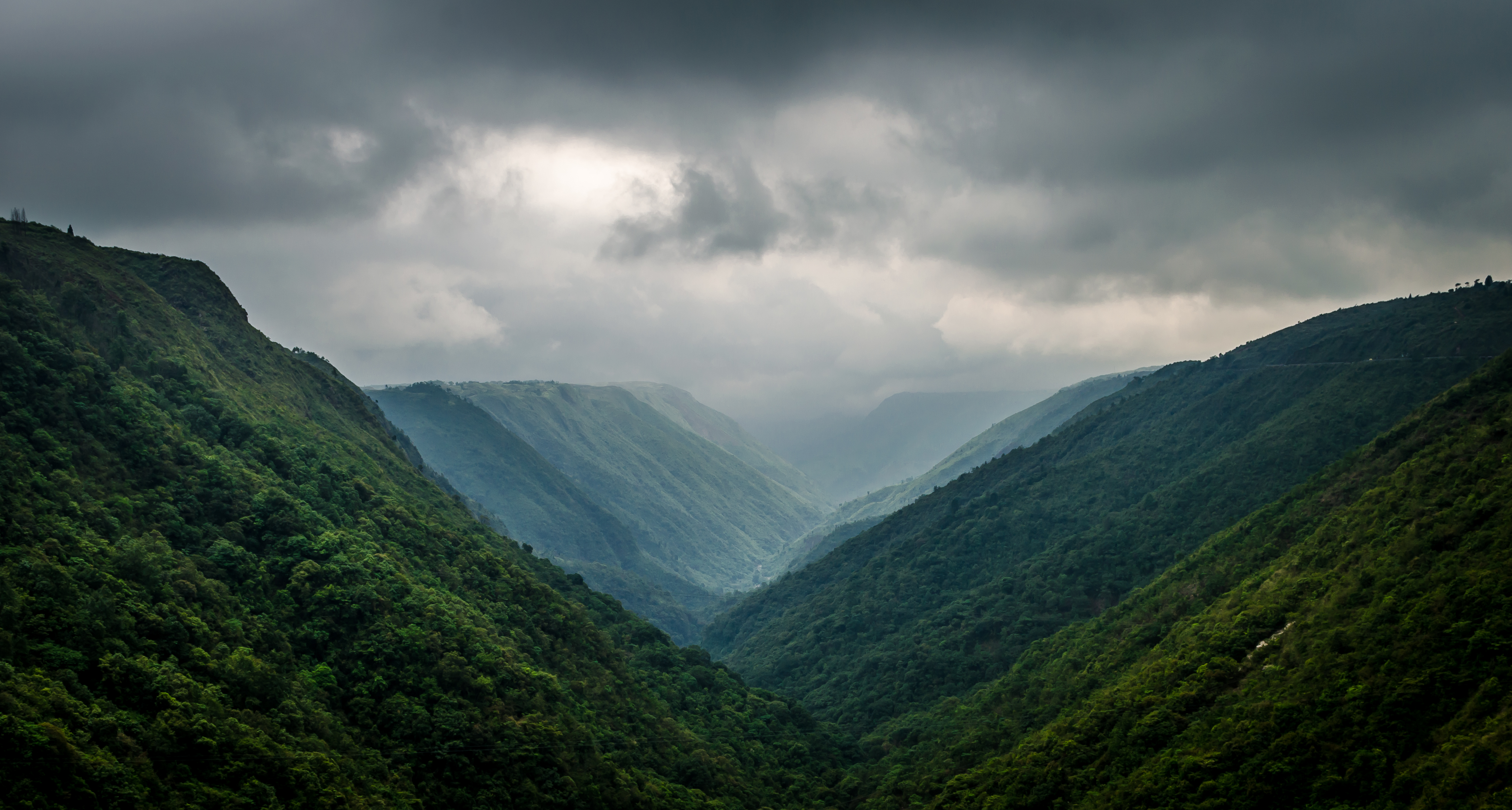
- Interactive map of East Khasi Hills district
- Country: India
- State: Meghalaya
- Headquarters: Shillong

Government
  - Vidhan Sabha constituencies: 17

Area
  - Total: 2,748 km^{2} (1,061 sq mi)

Population (2011)
  - Total: 825,922
  - Density: 300.6/km^{2} (778.4/sq mi)

Demographics
  - Literacy: 85.7%
  - Sex ratio: 1008
- Time zone: UTC+05:30 (IST)
- Major highways: NH-44, NH-40
- Website: eastkhasihills.gov.in

East Khasi Hills district is an administrative district in the state of Meghalaya in India. The district headquarters are located at Shillong. The district occupies an area of 2,748 km^{2} and has a population of 825,922 (as of 2011). As of 2011, it is the most populous of Meghalaya's 12 districts.

== History ==
The former Khasi Hills district was divided into East and West Khasi Hills districts on 28 October 1976. On 4 June 1992, East Khasi Hills District was further divided into two administrative districts of East Khasi Hills District and Ri-Bhoi District.

== Geography ==
Shillong is the district headquarters of East Khasi Hills District.

East Khasi Hills District forms a central part of Meghalaya and covers a total geographical area of 2,748 km^{2}. It lies approximately between 25°07" & 25°41" N Lat. And 91°21" & 92°09" E Long.

The north of the district is bounded by the plain of Ri-Bhoi District gradually rising to the rolling grasslands of the Shillong Plateau interspersed with river valleys, then falls sharply in the Southern portion forming a deep gorges and ravines in Mawsynram and Shella-Bholaganj, community and rural development block, bordering Bangladesh. The district is bounded by the Jaintia Hills District to the east and the West Khasi Hills District to the west.

The East Khasi Hills District is mostly hilly with deep gorges and ravines in its southern portion. The most important physiographic features of the district is the Shillong Plateau interspersed with river valley, then fall sharply in the southern portion forming deep gorges and ravine in Mawsynram and Shella-Bholaganj bordering Bangladesh. Shillong peak, 10 km from the city, offers a panoramic view of the scenic countryside and is also the highest point not just in the district but the State as well.

=== Climate ===
The climate of the district ranges from temperate in the plateau region to the warmer tropical and sub-tropical pockets on the Northern and Southern regions. The whole of the district is influenced by the south-west monsoon which begins generally from May and continues till September. The weather is humid for the major portion of the year except for the relatively dry spell usually between December and March.

Climate data for Shillong
Month	Jan	Feb	Mar	Apr	May	Jun	Jul	Aug	Sep	Oct	Nov	Dec	Year
Mean daily maximum °F (°C)	51 (11)	54 (12)	72 (22)	75 (24)	75 (24)	75 (24)	75 (24)	77 (25)	75 (24)	63 (17)	48 (9)	43 (6)	65 (19)
Mean daily minimum °F (°C)	33 (1)	36 (2)	54 (12)	59 (15)	61 (16)	64 (18)	66 (19)	64 (18)	64 (18)	49 (9)	32 (0)	26 (−3)	51 (10)
Average rainfall inches (mm)	0.0 (1)	0.1 (3)	4.3 (109)	12.3 (312)	23.9 (607)	43.7 (1,111)	45.6 (1,159)	29.2 (741)	21.7 (552)	9.5 (242)	1.0 (25)	0.6 (15)	191.9 (4,877)
Average rainy days	1	2	5	11	15	18	19	16	13	6	2	1	109
Source: http://worldclimateguide.co.uk/climateguides/india/shillong.php

== Divisions ==
=== Administrative divisions ===
East Khasi Hills division is divided into eight blocks:

Name	Headquarters	Population	Location
Khatarshnong Laitkroh	Mawjrong		
Mawkynrew	Mawkynrew		
Mawphlang	Mawphlang		
Mawryngkneng	Mawryngkneng		
Mawsynram	Mawsynram		
Mylliem	Mylliem		
Pynsursla	Pynsursla		
Shella Bholaganj	Cherrapunjee		

== Demographics ==
Religion in East Khasi Hills
Religions	Percentage
Christians	65.79%
Hindus	17.55%
Niam Khasi	14.00%
Muslims	1.72%
Buddhists	0.38%
Sikhs	0.30%
Jains	0.03%
#, includes animists and ethnic religions.

According to the 2011 census, East Khasi Hills district has a population of 825,922, roughly equal to the nation of Comoros or the US state of South Dakota. This gives it a ranking of 478th in India (out of a total of 640). The district has a population density of 292 inhabitants per square kilometre (760/sq mi). Its population growth rate over the decade 2001-2011 was 24.68%. East Khasi Hills has a sex ratio of 1008 females for every 1000 males, and a literacy rate of 84.7%. East Khasi Hills is the most diverse district of Meghalaya with having people from all the parts of India.

== Culture ==
=== Places of interest ===
- Kongthong village is a popular tourist destination where people use the whistled language and build living root bridges.
- Kynrem Falls
- Mawlynnong village, located in the Pynsursla block, is known for its cleanliness. The travel magazine Discover India declared the village as the cleanest in Asia in 2003, and the cleanest in India in 2005.
- Nohkalikai Falls one of the tallest falls in India is located near Sohra (Cherrapunjee).
- Nohsngithiang Falls
- Shillong the headquarters of this district is a hill station with a number of tourist attraction all around.
- Sohra (Cherrapunjee) once the wettest place on the planet, also known for its living root bridges and is a tourist attraction.
- Sweet Falls located in Mawshabuit
- Umiam Lake an artificial lake on the way to Shillong.
- Elephant Falls, a waterfall in Shillong.

== Transport ==
The headquarters of the district, Shillong which is also the capital city of State, is connected to Guwahati and Silchar by NH 44 of 103 km and 240 km respectively. The nearest Rail head and airport are situated at Guwahati. There is an airstrip suitable for small aircraft at Umroi which is 35 km from Shillong. The agricultural and other products are transported by trucks, jeeps and tractors. Shillong is well connected with other parts of the State by motorable road. Similarly, all the block headquarters in the district are also connected by roads. However, the villages in the interior areas are poorly connected and transport services are inadequate.

== Gallery ==
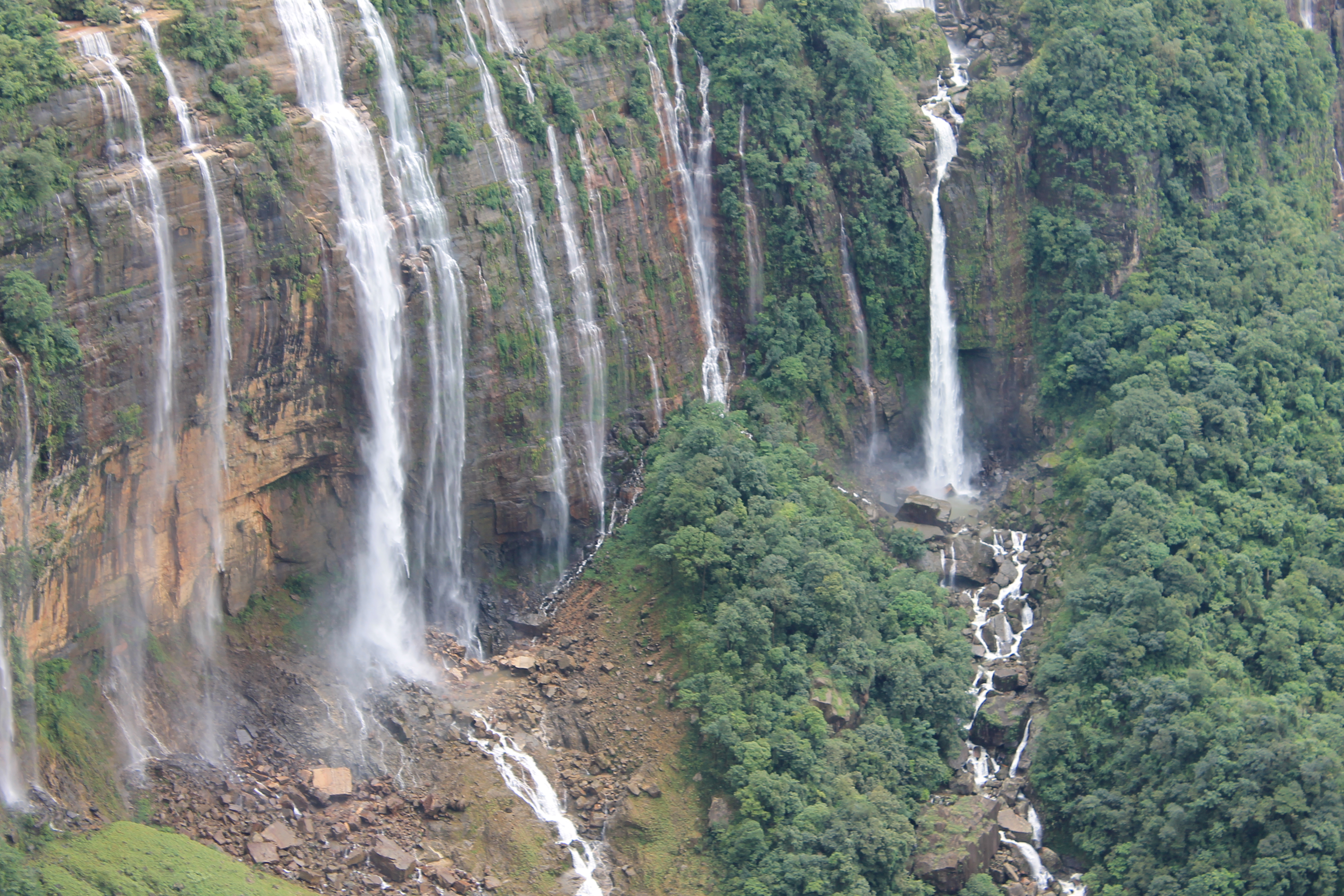
Noh Kalikai falls near cherrapunjee

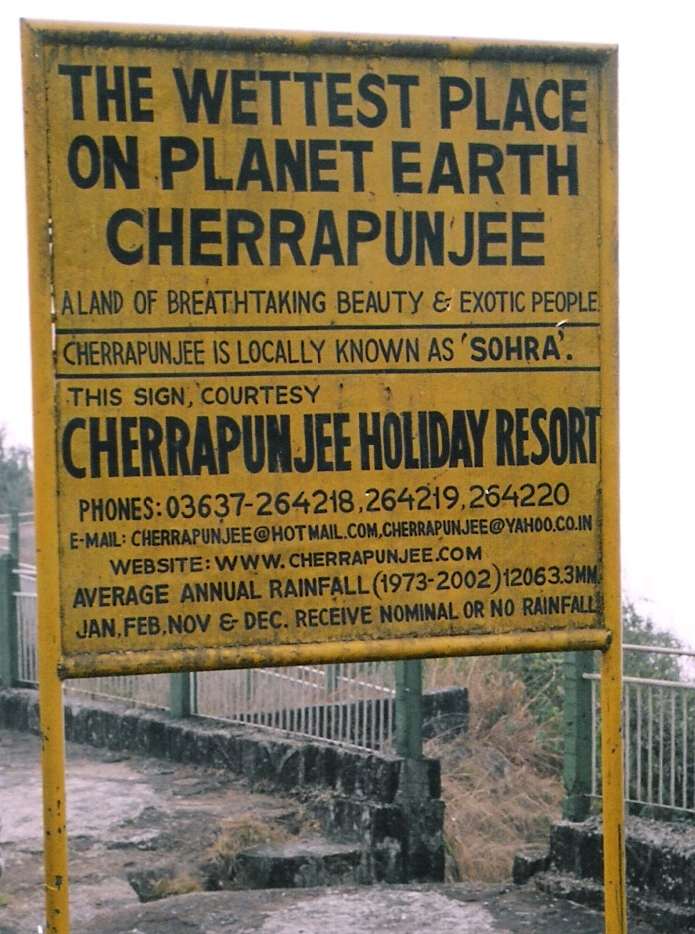
Highest Rainfall in the world in cherrapunjee

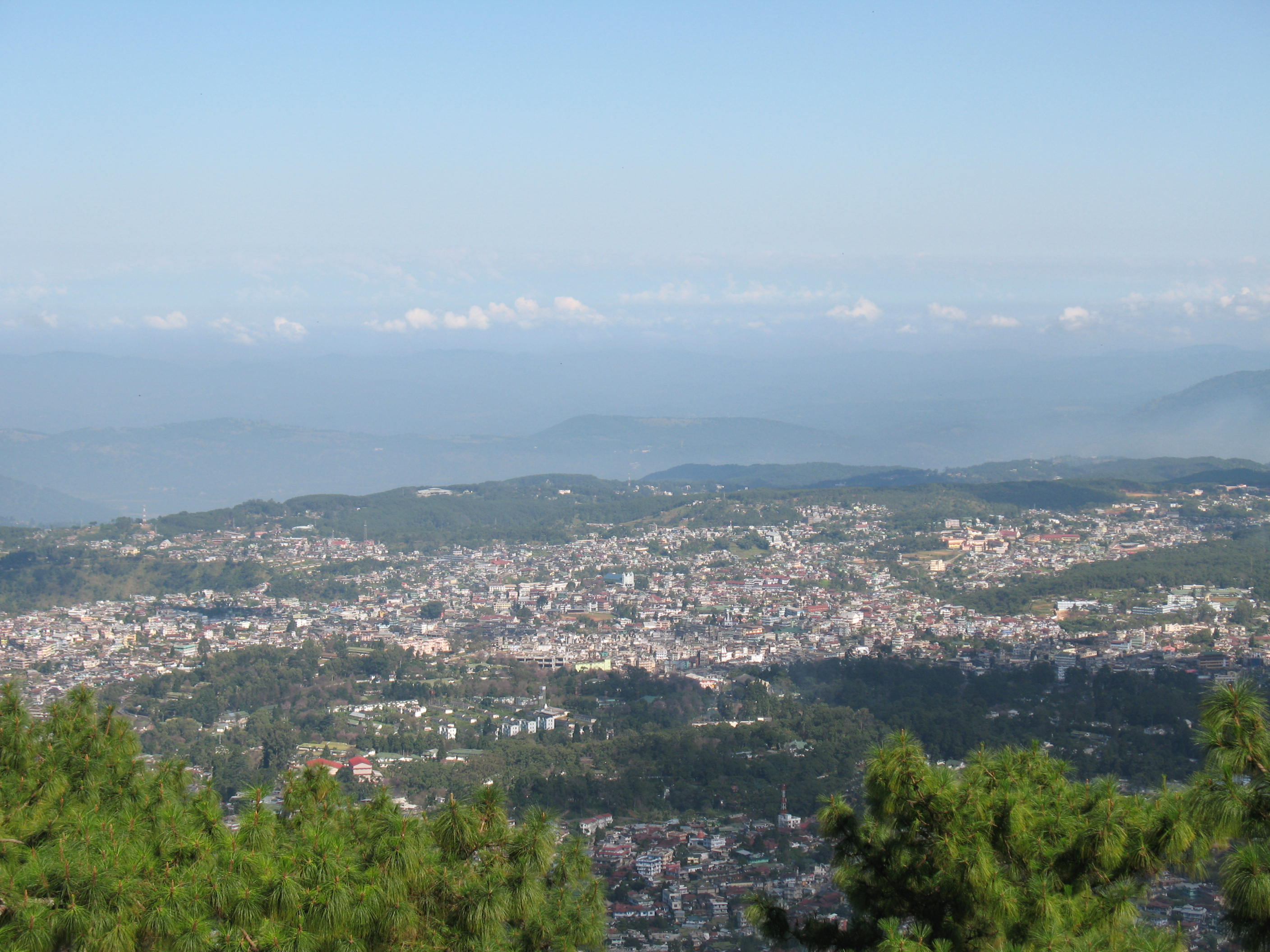
Shillong-The District Headquarters

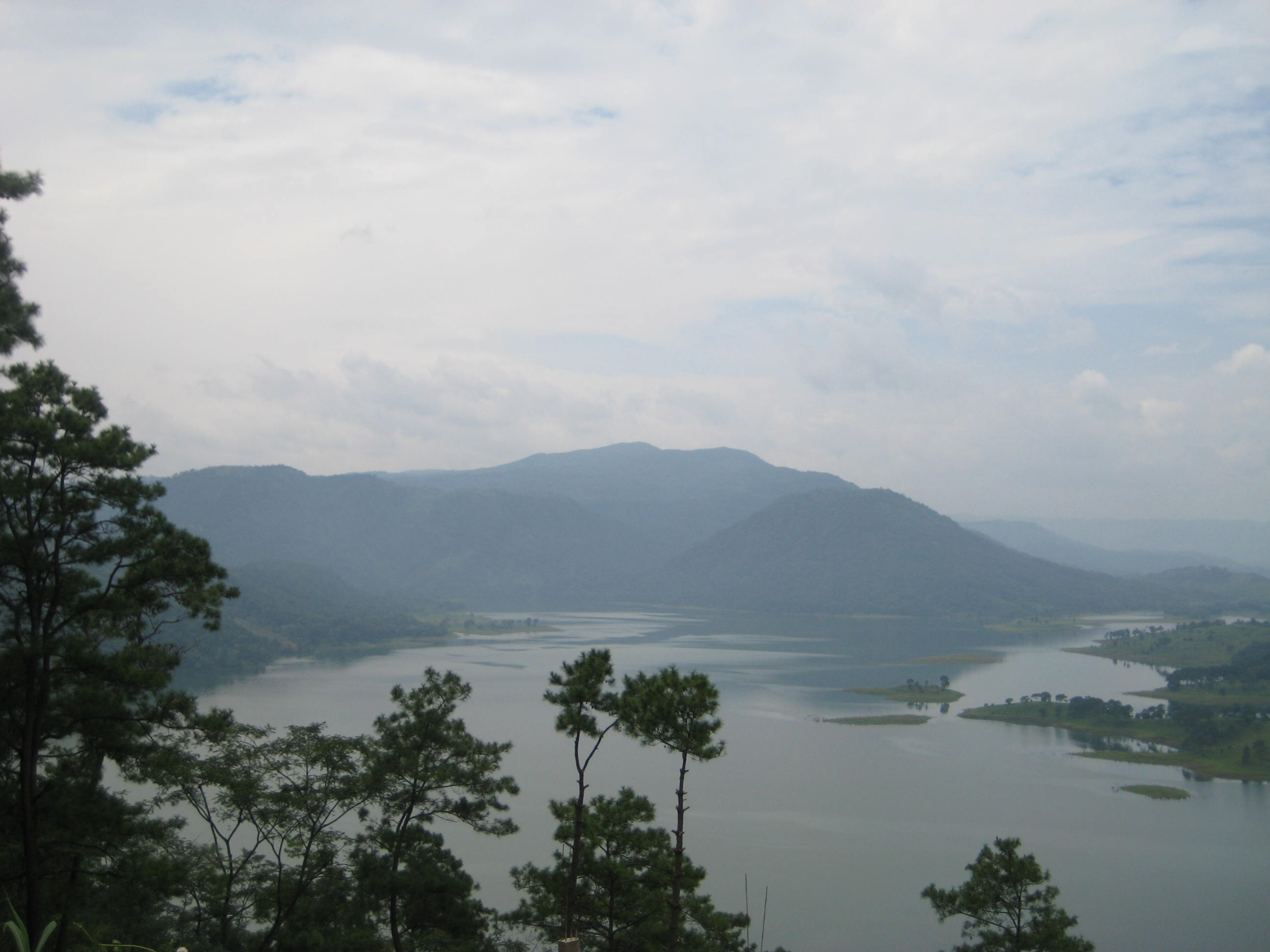
Umiam Lake
