= Cherrapunji =

Cherrapunji Sohra
- Town
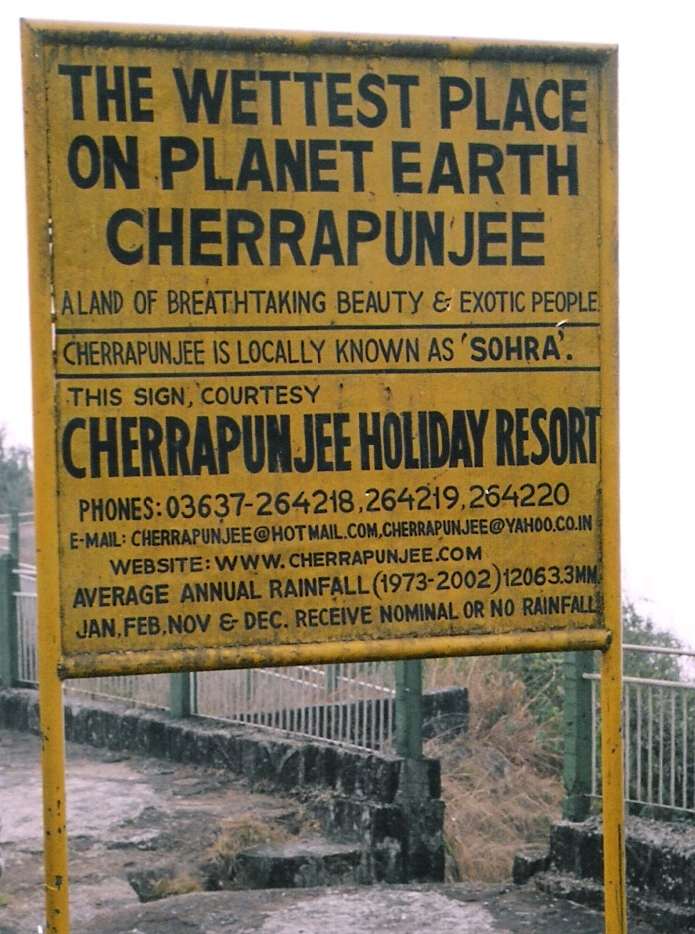
- Sohra has held the record for highest rainfall multiple times in the past.

- Location in Meghalaya Cherrapunji (India)
- Coordinates: 25.284°N 91.721°E
- Country: India
- State: Meghalaya
- District: East Khasi Hills
- Elevation: 1,430 m (4,690 ft)

Population (2011)
  - Total: 14,816
  - Density: 397/km^{2} (1,030/sq mi)

Languages
  - Official: Khasi, English
- Time zone: UTC+5:30 (IST)
- Telephone code: 03637
- Precipitation: 11,777 millimetres (463.7 in)
- Climate: Cwb
- Website: sohra.gov.in

Cherrapunji (/ˌtʃɛrəˈpʌndʒi, -ˈpʊn-/), also known as Sohra, is a sub-divisional town (Proposed District) in the East Khasi Hills district in the Indian state of Meghalaya. It was the traditional capital of ka hima Sohra (Khasi tribal kingdom).

Sohra has often been credited as being the wettest place on Earth, but currently, nearby Mawsynram holds that distinction. Sohra still holds the all-time record for the most rainfall in a calendar month and in a year, however. It received 9,300 millimetres (370 in; 30.5 ft) in July 1861 and 26,461 millimetres (1,041.8 in; 86.814 ft) between 1 August 1860 and 31 July 1861.

== Background ==
=== Etymology ===
The original native name for this town in Khasi language is Sohra (soh-ra), which was mispronounced "Cherra" by the 19th century British colonisers. Later, the suffix "punjee", a Bengali term meaning "a cluster of villages", was added by people from the plains, and the name evolved into Cherrapunji, meaning "land of oranges" in some interpretations, popularized by tourists from other parts of India. It has again been officially renamed to its original form, Sohra.

=== History ===
The history of the Khasi people – native inhabitants of Sohra– may be traced from the early part of the 16th century. Between the 16th and 18th centuries, these people were ruled by their tribal 'Syiems (rajas or chiefs) of Khyriem' in the Khasi Hills.

The main pivot on which the entire superstructure of Khasi society rests is the matrilineal system.

The Khasi hills came under British authority in 1833 with the submission of the last of the important Syiem, Tirot Sing Syiem.

There is a monument to David Scott (British Administrator in NE India, 1802–1831) in the town's cemetery.

Despite abundant rainfall, Sohra faces an acute water shortage and the inhabitants often have to trek very long distances to obtain potable water. Irrigation is hampered due to excessive rain washing away the topsoil as a result of human encroachment into the forests. Recent developments of rain-water harvesting techniques in the area have greatly helped the town and its neighbouring villages.

== Economy ==
=== Education ===
==== Colleges ====
- Ramkrishna Mission College, Sohra
- Sohra Government College

Sohra has the National Institute of Technology, Meghalaya near Saitsophen, which offers undergraduate, postgraduate and doctoral degrees. Independent schools like the Ramkrishna Mission School and government-run schools like the Thomas Jones School have been set up in and around the town.

=== Media ===
Sohra has an All India Radio relay station known as Akashvani Sohra. It broadcasts on FM frequencies.

=== Tourism ===
Tourism is main economic activity, and Sohra is used as a base town and central hub for tourists who visit the nearby tourist places such as the mountains, valleys, viewpoints, caves, rivers, waterfalls, and traditional bridges.

Sohra is also known for its living bridges. Over hundreds of years the people have developed techniques for growing roots of trees into large bridges. The process takes 10 to 15 years and the bridges typically last hundreds of years, with the oldest one, still in active use, being over 500 years old.

=== Transport ===
Shillong Airport, 80 km north, is the only operational civilian airport in Meghalaya with the domestic flights within Northeast India. Guwahati Airport, 165 km north in Assam state, is major airport for the regional, national and international air connectivity.

SH-5 (Meghalaya State Highway 5) connects Sohra to Shillong, and Shillong is further connected to Guwahati by the NH-6.

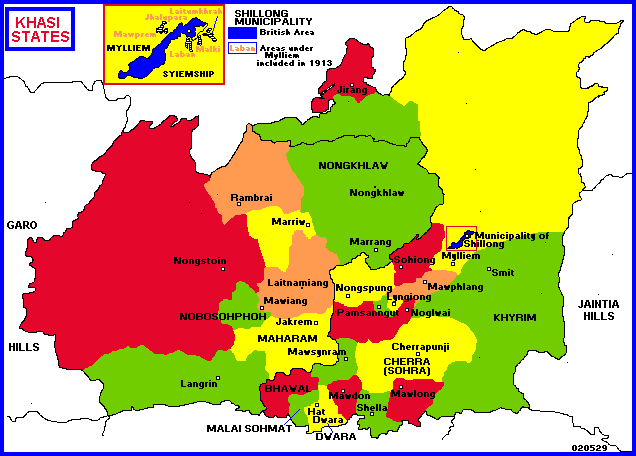
Historic Khasi states in Meghalaya

Guwahati railway station, 165 km north, is the nearest railway station which connects to the rest of India. Once the under-construction Tetelia–Byrnihat line (Shillong) is completed, it will bring the rail connectivity closer to Sohra.

== Geography ==
Sohra, India

Climate chart (precipitation, max. and min. temperature)
J	F	M	A	M	J	J	A	S	O	N	D
11 16 7	46 17 9	240 21 13	938 22 15	1214 22 16	2294 23 18	3272 22 18	1760 23 18	1352 23 18	549 23 16	72 20 12	29 17 8
- █ Average max. and min. temperatures in °C
- █ Precipitation totals in mm
- Source: NOAA
Imperial conversion
J	F	M	A	M	J	J	A	S	O	N	D
0.4 60 45	1.8 63 48	9.4 69 55	37 71 58	48 72 61	90 73 64	129 72 65	69 73 65	53 73 64	22 73 60	2.8 69 54	1.1 63 47
- █ Average max. and min. temperatures in °F
- █ Precipitation totals in inches

The Shillong Plateau is an uplifted horst-like feature, bounded by the E-W Main Boundary Thrust (MBT) to the North, the N–S Jamuna fault in the west, and the NW–SE kopilli fracture zone in the east.

Sohra has an average elevation of 1,430 metres (4,690 ft) and sits on a plateau in the southern part of the Khasi Hills, facing the plains of Bangladesh. The plateau rises 660 metres (2,170 ft) above the surrounding valleys.

Soils on the plateau are poor owing to deforestation and washout caused by heavy rainfall. Owing to winter droughts, the vegetation in this location is even xerophytic in spite of the town's fame as an extremely wet place. Additional pressure on local ecosystems is created by the rapid increase of the population – from a Sohra-area population of 7,000 in 1960, it grew to over 10,000 by 2000.

The valleys around Sohra, however, are covered with lush and very diverse vegetation, containing numerous endemic species of plants, including the Meghalaya subtropical forests.

There are some interesting living root bridges in villages near Sohra like the Umshiang Root Bridge, Mawsaw root bridge, Ritymmen root bridge, and the Double Decker root bridge at Nongriat village.

=== Climate ===
Sohra has a mild subtropical highland climate (Köppen Cwb), with monsoonal influences typical of India. Although Sohra has very wet, warm summers, it has dry, mild winters. The city's annual rainfall average stands at 11,777 millimetres (463.7 in). This figure places it behind only nearby Mawsynram, Meghalaya, whose average is 11,873 millimetres (467.4 in). Sohra receives both the southwest and northeast monsoonal winds, giving it a single monsoon season. It lies on the windward side of the Khasi Hills, so the resulting orographic lift enhances precipitation. In the winter months it receives the northeast monsoon showers that travel down the Brahmaputra valley. The driest months are November, December, January, and February.

Temperatures average 11.5 °C (52.7 °F) in January and 20.6 °C (69.1 °F) in August, and the annual mean is 17.3 °C (63.1 °F)

Sohra holds two Guinness world records for receiving the maximum amount of rainfall in a single year: 26,471 millimetres (1,042.2 in) of rainfall between August 1860 and July 1861 and for receiving the maximum amount of rainfall in a single month: 9,300 millimetres (370 in) in July 1861.

Climate data for Cherrapunji (1991–2020, extremes 1902–present)
Month	Jan	Feb	Mar	Apr	May	Jun	Jul	Aug	Sep	Oct	Nov	Dec	Year
Record high °C (°F)	26.7 (80.1)	28.9 (84.0)	30.6 (87.1)	28.3 (82.9)	30.9 (87.6)	29.9 (85.8)	30.3 (86.5)	30.3 (86.5)	33.1 (91.6)	32.1 (89.8)	28.7 (83.7)	25.6 (78.1)	33.1 (91.6)
Mean maximum °C (°F)	20.6 (69.1)	22.2 (72.0)	25.3 (77.5)	26.0 (78.8)	26.5 (79.7)	26.8 (80.2)	26.9 (80.4)	27.6 (81.7)	27.9 (82.2)	27.5 (81.5)	25.6 (78.1)	21.9 (71.4)	28.9 (84.0)
Mean daily maximum °C (°F)	17.2 (63.0)	18.8 (65.8)	21.4 (70.5)	22.7 (72.9)	23.1 (73.6)	23.1 (73.6)	22.9 (73.2)	23.6 (74.5)	23.9 (75.0)	24.0 (75.2)	21.8 (71.2)	18.8 (65.8)	21.8 (71.2)
Daily mean °C (°F)	12.3 (54.1)	14.1 (57.4)	17.0 (62.6)	18.7 (65.7)	19.9 (67.8)	20.6 (69.1)	20.6 (69.1)	21.1 (70.0)	21.0 (69.8)	20.0 (68.0)	16.9 (62.4)	13.8 (56.8)	18.0 (64.4)
Mean daily minimum °C (°F)	6.6 (43.9)	8.7 (47.7)	12.1 (53.8)	14.4 (57.9)	16.1 (61.0)	17.7 (63.9)	18.1 (64.6)	18.2 (64.8)	17.6 (63.7)	15.3 (59.5)	11.4 (52.5)	8.2 (46.8)	13.7 (56.7)
Mean minimum °C (°F)	3.2 (37.8)	4.9 (40.8)	8.1 (46.6)	10.4 (50.7)	12.4 (54.3)	15.3 (59.5)	16.4 (61.5)	16.6 (61.9)	15.6 (60.1)	11.8 (53.2)	8.0 (46.4)	5.2 (41.4)	3.0 (37.4)
Record low °C (°F)	−1.0 (30.2)	0.3 (32.5)	0.6 (33.1)	3.9 (39.0)	3.3 (37.9)	9.2 (48.6)	10.0 (50.0)	9.0 (48.2)	12.4 (54.3)	7.8 (46.0)	3.7 (38.7)	1.7 (35.1)	−1.0 (30.2)
Average rainfall mm (inches)	15.5 (0.61)	53.7 (2.11)	364.1 (14.33)	792.4 (31.20)	1,297.1 (51.07)	2,608.1 (102.68)	2,665.4 (104.94)	1,768.7 (69.63)	1,089.7 (42.90)	461.4 (18.17)	49.3 (1.94)	10.2 (0.40)	11,175.8 (439.99)
Average rainy days (≥ 2.5 mm)	1.4	2.5	7.4	16.1	20.7	25.2	27.8	24.1	18.2	7.6	1.6	0.8	153.5
Average relative humidity (%)	69	66	68	79	85	92	94	92	89	80	70	70	80
Source 1: India Meteorological Department
Source 2: NOAA (humidity), Tokyo Climate Center (mean temperatures 1991–2020)

=== Causes of high rainfall ===
Sohra receives rains from the Bay of Bengal arm of the Indian summer monsoon. The monsoon clouds fly unhindered over the plains of Bangladesh for about 400 km. Thereafter, they hit the Khasi Hills which rise abruptly from the plains to a height of about 1,370 m above mean sea level within 2 to 5 km. The geography of the hills with many deep valley channels encompassing the low-flying (150–300 m) moisture-laden clouds from a wide area converges over Sohra. The winds push the rain clouds through these gorges and up the steep slopes. The rapid ascent of the clouds into the upper atmosphere hastens the cooling and helps vapours to condense. Most of the rain is the result of air being lifted as a large body of water vapour. The extreme amount of rainfall is perhaps the best-known feature of orographic rain in northeastern India.

Occasionally, cloudbursts can occur in one part of Sohra while other areas may be totally or relatively dry, reflecting the high spatial variability of the rainfall. Atmospheric humidity is extremely high during the peak monsoon period.

The major part of the rainfall at Sohra can be attributed to the orographic features. When the clouds are blown over the hills from the south, they are funneled through the valley. The clouds strike Sohra perpendicularly and the low flying clouds are pushed up the steep slopes. It is not surprising to find that the heaviest rainfalls occur when the winds blow directly on the Khasi Hills.

A notable feature of monsoon rain at Sohra is that most of it falls in the morning. This could be partly due to two air masses coming together. During the monsoon months, the prevailing winds along the Brahmaputra valley generally blow from the east or the northeast, but the winds over Meghalaya are from the south. These two winds systems usually come together in the vicinity of the Khasi Hills. Apparently, the winds that are trapped in the valley at night begin their upward ascent only after they are warmed during the day. This partially explains the frequency of morning rainfall. Apart from orographic features, atmospheric convection plays an important role during the monsoon and the period just preceding it.

== People ==
=== Culture ===
The native inhabitants living in and around Sohra are known as Khasi people. Their society is a matrilineal one. The children take on the surname of the mother.

=== Demographics ===
Religion in Cherrapunji (2011)
1. Christianity (71.4%)
2. Niam Khasi (24.4%)
3. Hinduism (3.97%)
4. Islam (0.08%)
5. Others (0.19%)

As of the 2011 census of India, Sohra had a population of 10,086, with males 48.75% of the total population and females 51.25%. It has an average literacy rate of 74%, equal to the national average of 74.5%, with a male literacy rate of 72.4% and a female one of 73.9%.

Most of the people in the town overwhelmingly follow Christianity, with significant followers of indigenous Niam Khasi, Hinduism and a very small Muslim population.

== Gallery ==
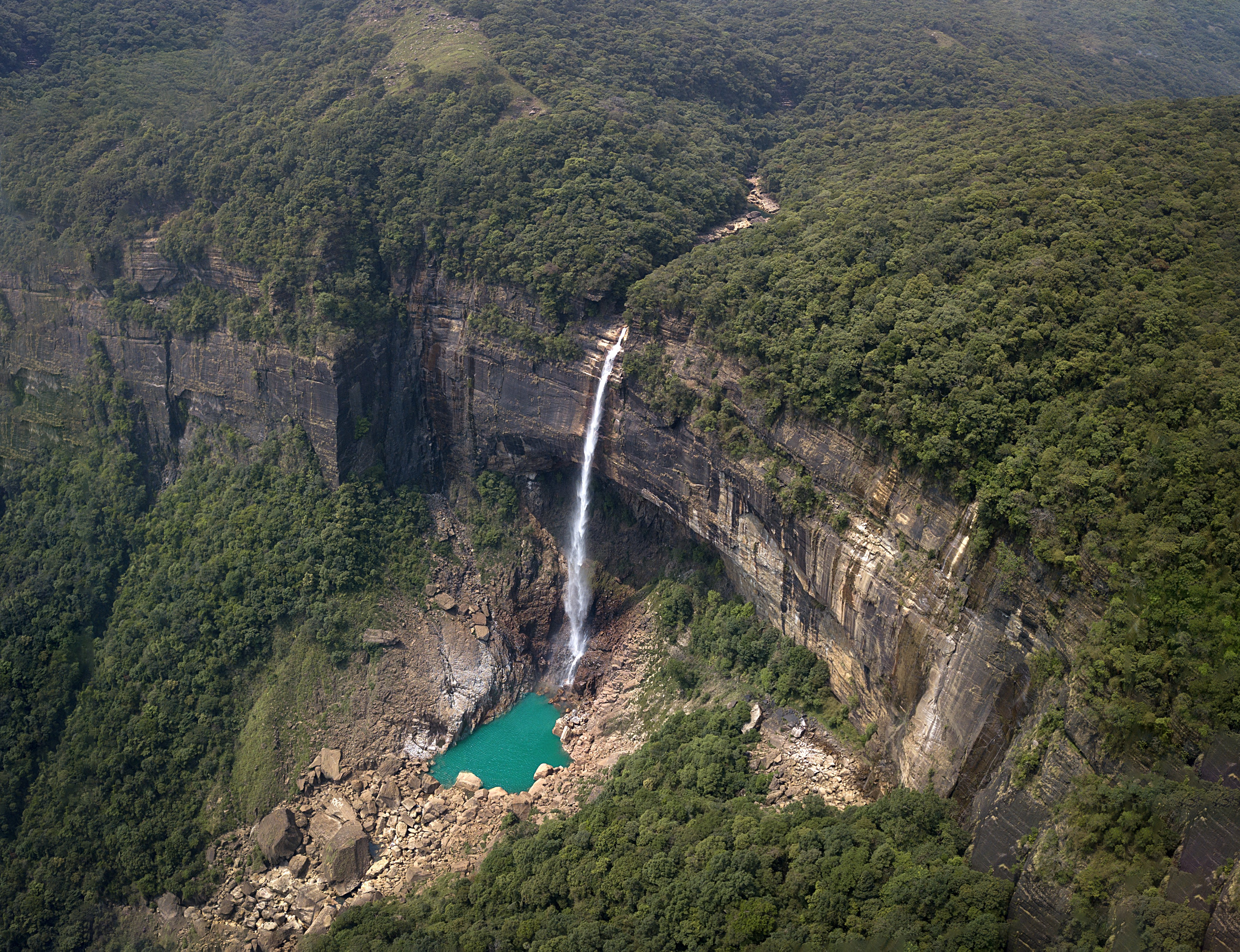
NohKaLikai Falls Aerial View

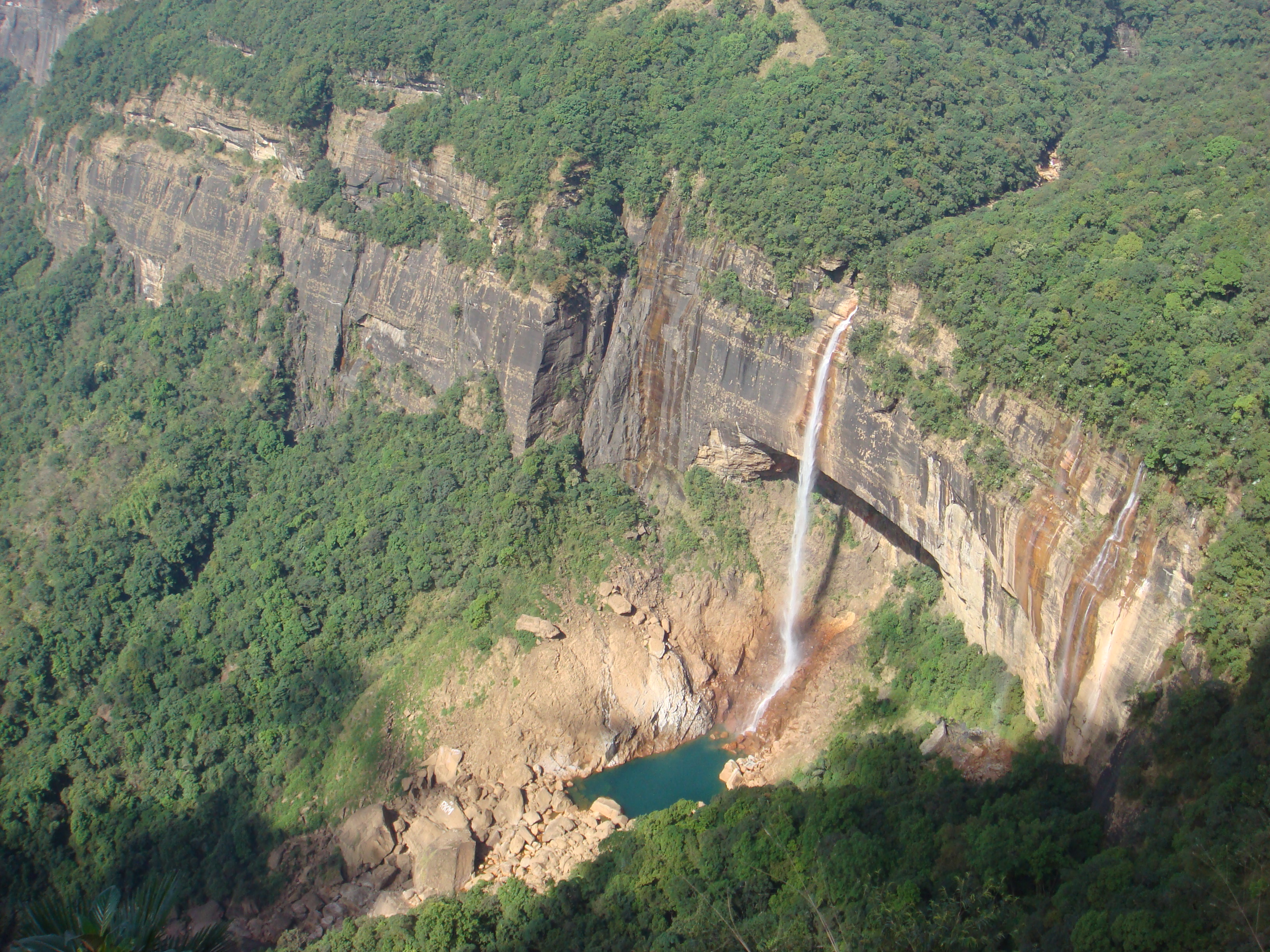
Nohkalikai falls

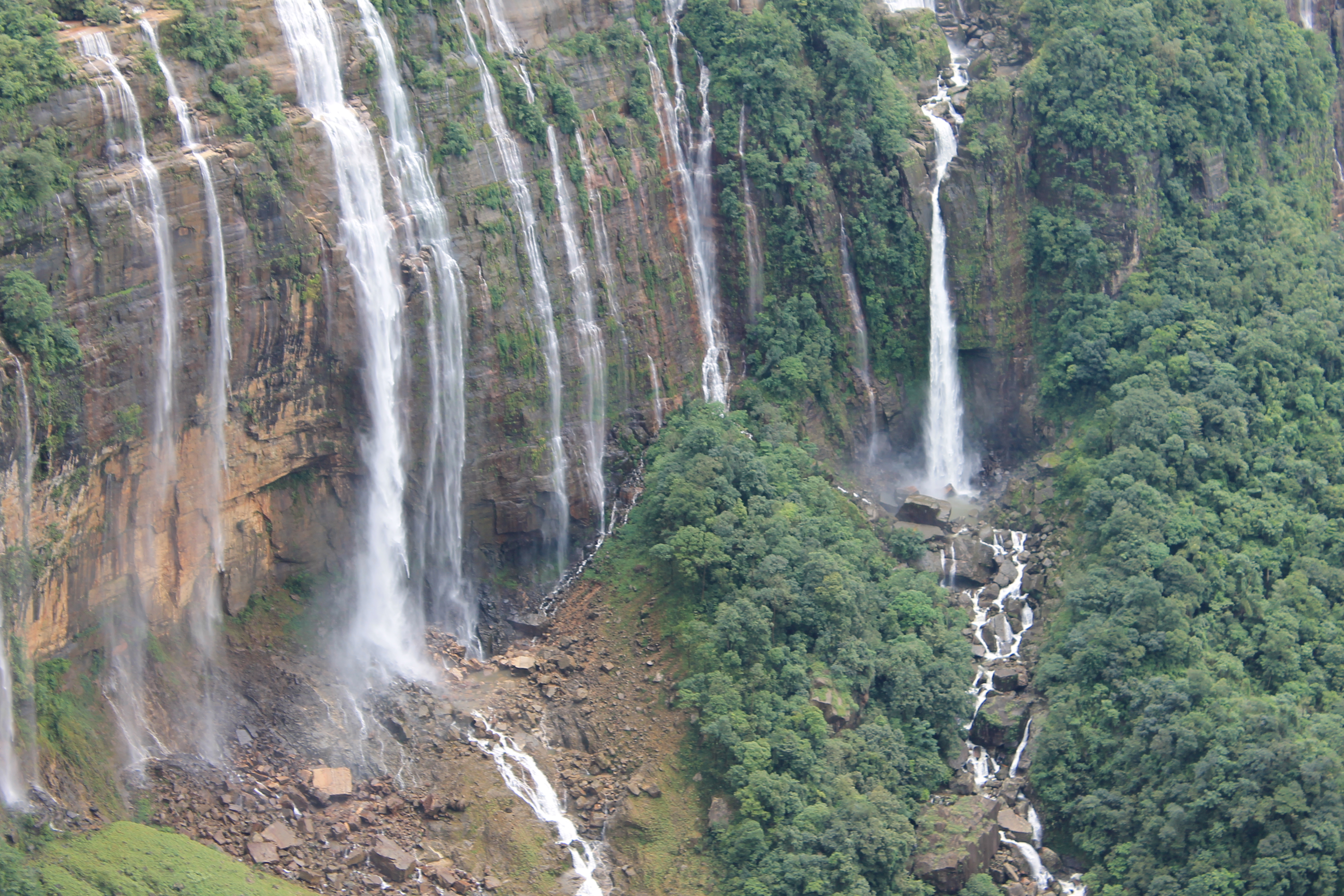
Seven Sisters' falls

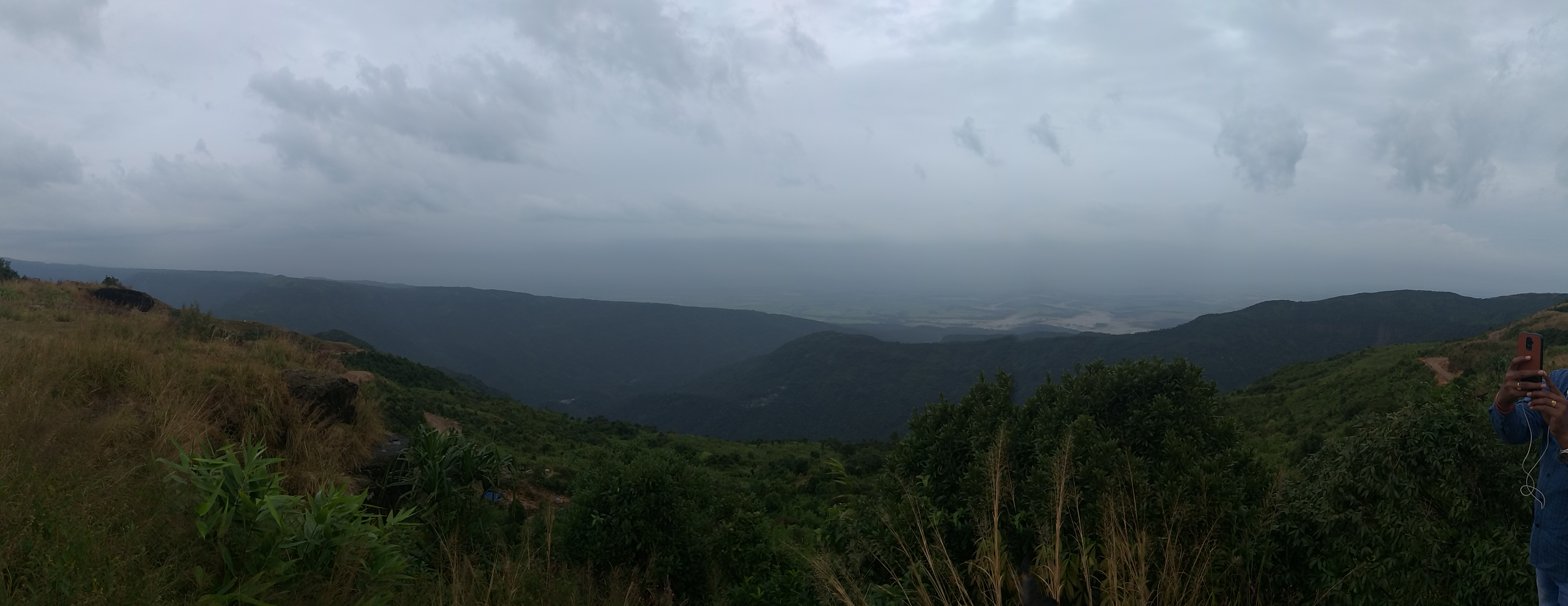
Bangladesh View Point in Sohra

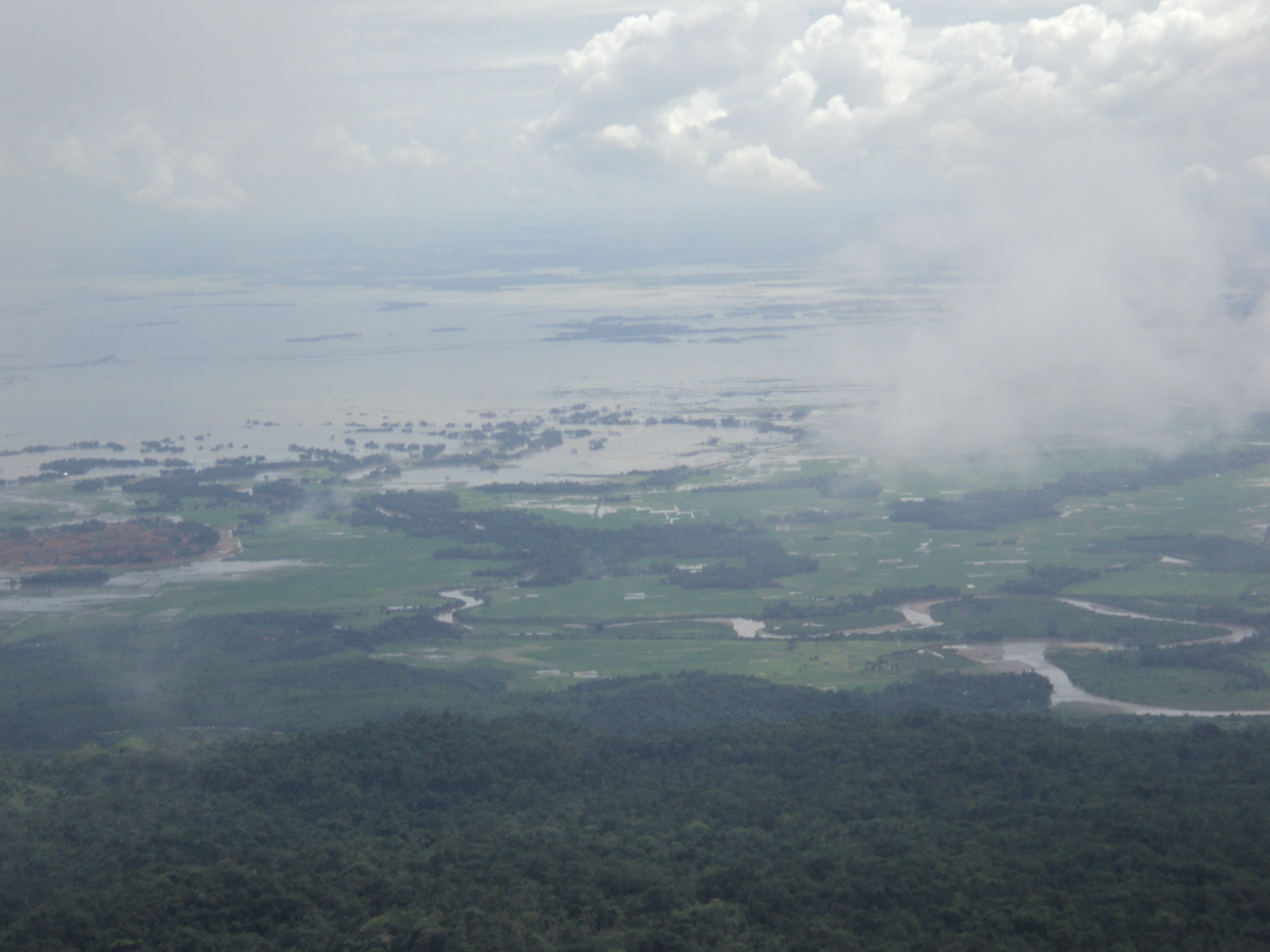
Another view of Bangladesh plains from Sohra

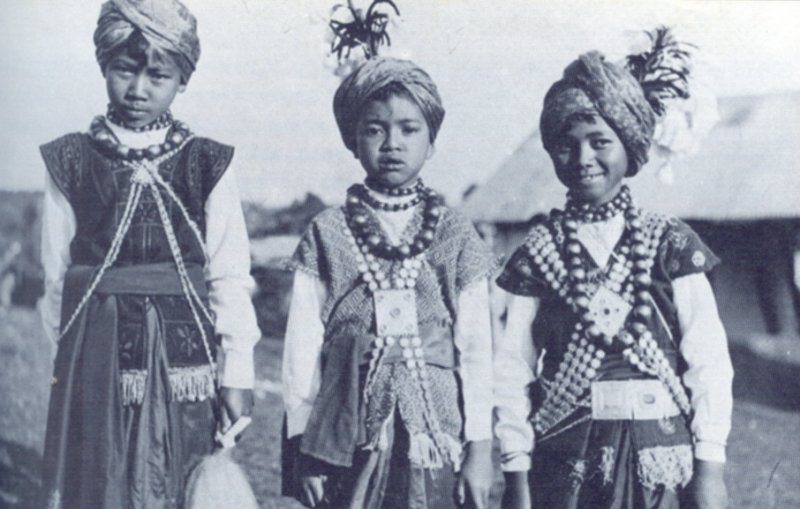
Khasi children c. 1944

== See also ==
- Tourism in Northeast India
- Wettest places on Earth
  - Big Bog, Maui, in Hawaii and among one world's wettest place
  - Lloró, in Colombia and among one world's wettest place
  - Quibdó, in Colombia and among one world's wettest place
  - Villa Puerto Edén, in Chile and among one world's wettest place
  - Yakushima, in Japan and among one world's wettest place

== Sources and external links ==
- Cherrapunji travel guide from Wikivoyage
- cherrapunjee.com
- Interactive Film Documentary by Geox - Testing A New Waterproof Shoe In The Rainiest Place On Earth
- 'For a Rainy Day', The Indian Express, 20 April 2008, by Arjun Razdan
