= Khasi Hills =

Coordinates: 25°35′N 91°38′E

- Region
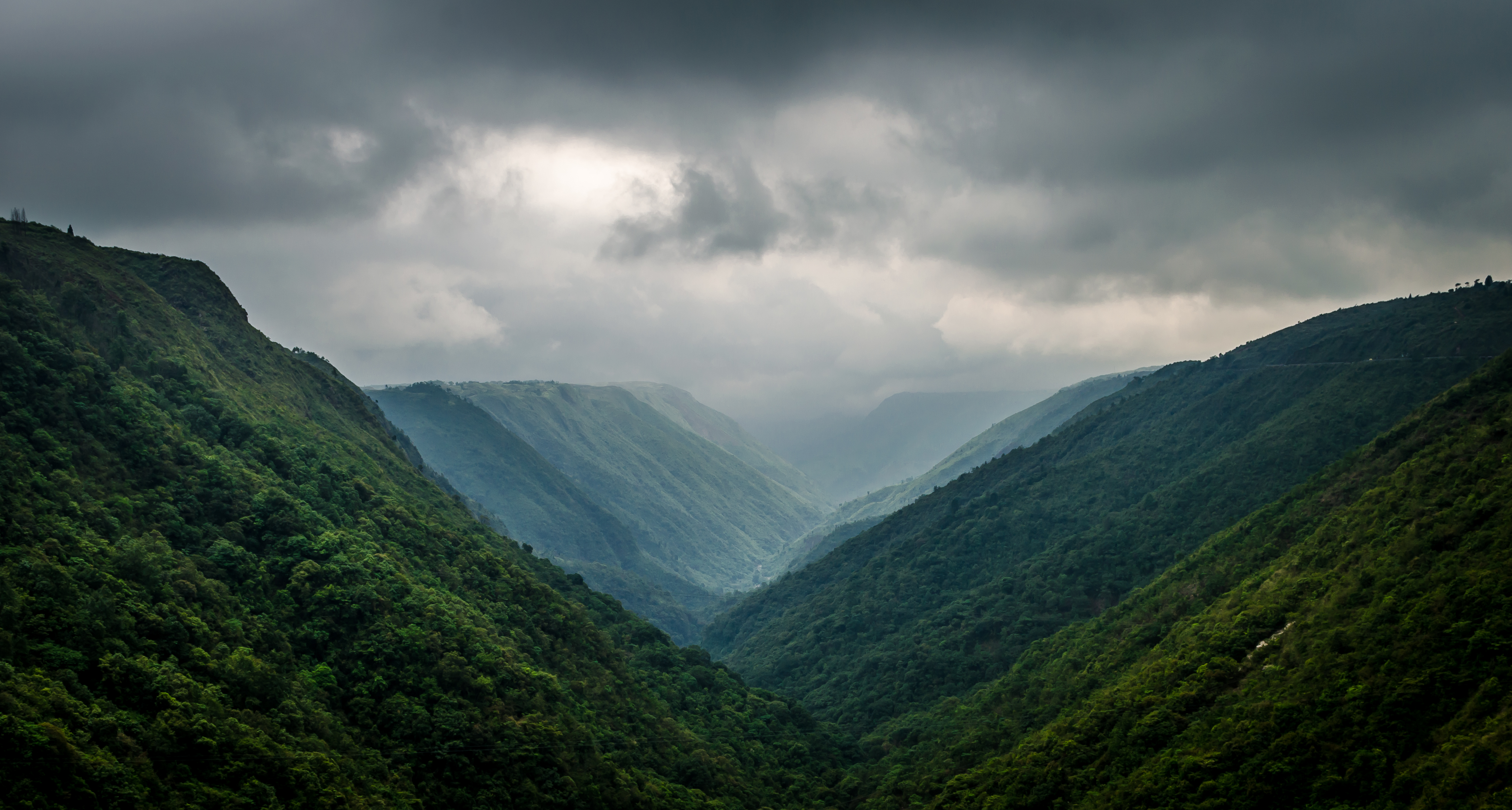
- Eastern Khasi Hills
- Interactive map of Khasi Hills
- Country: India
- State: Meghalaya

Area
  - Total: 10,443 km^{2} (4,032 sq mi)

Population (2011)
  - Total: 1,468,223
  - Density: 140.59/km^{2} (364.14/sq mi)

Languages
  - Spoken: 1. Khasi
- Districts: East Khasi Hills; West Khasi Hills; South West Khasi Hills; Eastern West Khasi Hills; Ri-Bhoi

The Khasi Hills (/ˈkɑːsi/) are a low mountain formation on the Shillong Plateau in the Meghalaya state of India. The Khasi Hills are part of the Garo-Khasi-Jaintia range and connect with the Purvanchal Range and the larger Patkai Range further east. The Khasi Hills, and the whole Garo-Khasi-Jaintia range, are in the Meghalaya subtropical forests ecoregion.

The Khasi Hills, and the entire Meghalaya state, was administratively part of Assam before 1970. In older sources in particular, the alternative transcription Khasia Hills is seen.

The region is inhabited mainly by tribal Khasi dwellers, who are traditionally in various chieftainships, states known as the Khasi Hill States. One of its capitals, Sohra, is considered one of the wettest places in the world. The majority of Khasis are Presbyterians followed by Catholics and Anglicans.

The region came under the Khasi Hills district, which was divided into the West Khasi Hills and East Khasi Hills districts on 28 October 1976.

The highest peak is Lum Shyllong which is 1,968 metres (6,457 ft) high. It is situated a few kilometers south of Shillong town.

== Administration ==
Administratively, the Khasi Hills used to be a part of the Khasi Hills district. The district was divided into East Khasi Hills district and West Khasi Hills district on 28 October 1976. On 4 June 1992, the Ri-Bhoi District was carved out of the East Khasi Hills District.

== Demographics ==
The population of the region according to the 2011 Census was 1,468,223.

=== Religion ===
Religion in Khasi Hills (2011)
1. Christianity (76.9%)
2. Hinduism (12.4%)
3. Niam Khasi (8.70%)
4. Islam (1.19%)
5. Others (0.81%)

A vast majority of 1,128,769 people in Khasi Hills follow Christianity of various denominations, mostly Presbyterian and Catholic. Hinduism is mainly followed by 182,353 people, mainly non-tribals (Bengalis, Nepalis, Biharis, Marwaris etc.) living in the region. A small segment of Khasi tribe members numbering around 127,735 still follow their indigenous tribal religion called "Ka Niam Khasi", Islam is a tiny minority with around 17,471 people following it. 0.81 percent follow other religions.

=== Language ===
Languages of Khasi Hills (2011)
1. Khasi (78.3%)
2. Garo (6.03%)
3. Bengali (3.82%)
4. Nepali (3.27%)
5. Others. (8.61%)

Khasi is spoken by 1,149,178 people as their mother tongue, and Garo is spoken by 88,533, while Bengali and Nepali come in at 3rd and 4th position, spoken by 56,086 and 48,010 people respectively. A vast number of non-tribals can be found in the multi-diverse East Khasi Hills district.

== See also ==
- Garo Hills
- Khasi and Jaintia Hills
- Patkai
