= Panchgram =

H.P.C Township Panchgram H.P. C/Cachar Paper Mill Township, Panchgram
- Industrial Township
- Location in Assam, India H.P.C Township Panchgram (India)
- Coordinates: 24°51′40″N 92°35′46″E
- Country: India
- State: Assam
- District: Cachar

Population (2001)
  - Total: 5,578

Languages
  - Official: Bengali and Meitei (Manipuri)
- Time zone: UTC+5:30 (IST)
- Vehicle registration: AS 11

Hindustan Paper Corporation Limited Township, Panchgram was an industrial township in Panchgram under Cachar district, state of Assam. It was the finest township of the Barak Valley Under Hindustan Paper Corporation Limited (It was also called as the second Shillong of Barak Valley Area) and From 2022, it has been closed due to liquidation of Hindustan Paper Corporation limited and the whole township area has been acquired by the Assam Industrial Development Corporation.

== Demographics ==
Bengali and Meitei (Manipuri) are the official languages of this place.

As of 2001 India census, Hindustan Paper Corporation Ltd. Township Area Panchgram had a population of 5578. Males constitute 54% of the population and females 46%. Hindustan Paper Corporation Ltd. Township Area Panchgram has an average literacy rate of 73%, higher than the national average of 59.5%: male literacy is 79%, and female literacy is 67%. In Hindustan Paper Corporation Ltd. Township Area Panchgram, 14% of the population is under 6 years of age.

== Politics ==
Panchgram is a part of Algapur(Lok Sabha constituency)

== Transportation ==
The national highway NH 6 (Old NH 53) passes through the township and connects this place to Guwahati via Shillong.

Guwahati-Panchgram Expressway, the first expressway of Northeast India is a greenfield expressway from Guwahati to Umiam Lake (Barapani) in Meghalaya and then direct to old paper mill in Panchgram will cut the Guwahati to Punchgram by 5 hours.

== Geography ==
The Township area of Hindustan Paper Corporation Ltd was a hilly region with an average height of 120 m. The hills are fold mountains with rocks.

== Education/School ==
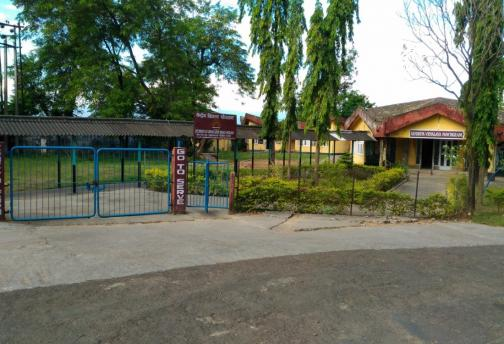
Front gate of Kendriya Vidyalaya Panchgrm

- Kendriya Vidyalaya, H.P.C Panchgram (An autonomous body of Kendriya Vidyalaya Sangathan and Ministry of Human Resource Development, Government of India)
- Shishu Niketan, H.P.C Panchgram (A unit of C.D.C, H.P.C Township Panchgram)- Before the year of 2000, this school formerly known as "Stepping Stone English School"

Now all schools has been closed.

== Clubs ==
1. Cachar Paper Mill Employees Recreation and Welfare Club
2. New Township Club
3. Officers Club
4. Cachar Paper Mill Ladies Club
5. Children's Development Center

Now all clubs has been closed.

== Unions/Associations ==
1. Cachar Paper Mill Mazdoor Sangh (BHARTIYA MAZDOOR SANGH)
2. Cachar Paper Workers and Employees Union (Recognized)
3. Cachar Paper Mill Workers Union
4. Cachar Paper Mill Mazdoor Union
5. Cachar Paper Mill Officers and Supervisors Association
6. Cachar Paper Mill SC/ST Welfare Association

== Holy Spots ==
1. Ram Mandir, Micro Area
2. Kali Mandir, Central Area of Township
3. Shani Mandir, Old Township Area
4. Cachar Paper Mill Christian Church, Old Township Area
5. Miraping Mokam (Shrine)
