= Umiam Lake =

Reservoir in Meghalaya, India

Umïam Lake
- Bara Pani
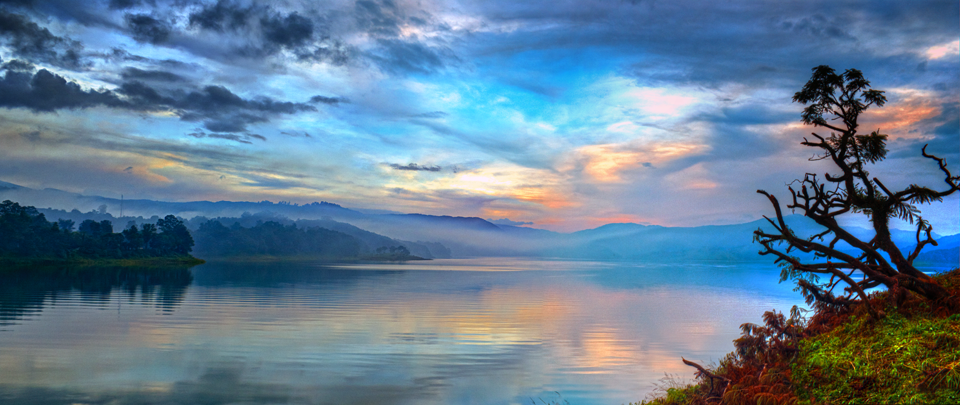
- View of Umïam Lake

- Location of Umiam Lake
- Interactive map of Umïam Lake
- Location: Meghalaya
- Coordinates: 25.6532°N 91.8843°E
- Type: Reservoir
- Catchment area: 220 km^{2} (85 sq mi)
- Basin countries: India
- Settlements: Shillong

Umïam Lake, also known as Bara Pani, is a reservoir in the hills 15 km (9.3 mi) north of Shillong in the state of Meghalaya, India. It was created by damming the Umïam River in the early 1960s. The principal catchment area of the lake and dam is spread over 225 square kilometres (87 sq mi).

In February 2025, the Guwahati - Panchgram Expressway was announced. It will be the first expressway of Northeast India is a greenfield expressway from Guwahati to Umiam (Barapani) in Meghalaya and then direct to old paper mill in Panchgram, which will reduce the Guwahati to Punchgram distance by 5 hours.

== Geography ==
Two rivers, namely, Wah Umkhrah and Wah Umshyrpi, feed into the Umiam lake.

== History ==
=== Umïam dam ===
Umïam Dam, which impounds the lake, was built by the Assam State Electricity Board in the early 1960s. The dam's original purpose was to store water for hydroelectric power generation. The Umïam Stage I powerhouse, north of the lake, has four 9-MW turbine-generators, which entered commercial operation in 1965. Umïam Stage I was the first reservoir-storage hydroelectric project commissioned in the northeastern region of India. (Umtru Hydroelectric Project, a run-of-river project with an original capacity of 8.4 MW, began operation in 1957). Three more stages of the Umïam Project were subsequently built downstream.

Before the construction of the dam for electricity, Khasi communities inhabited the Umïam Valley now flooded by the lake. Apart from the Gauhati-Shillong Road, the valley consisted of Ri-Kynti (public) and Ri-Raid (clan) land. When the Assam State Electricity Board conceptualised the hydroelectric project in June 1958, the plan envisioned submerging part of the valley, where Khwan and Umsaw villages were located. Two hundred families were scheduled to be displaced for the reservoir, dam, and powerhouse. People of Khwan and Umsaw initially opposed the plan to flood their villages.

== Tourist destination ==
The lake serves as a major tourist attraction for the state of Meghalaya. It is also a popular destination for water sport and adventure facilities. Tourists visit this spot for kayaking, water cycling, scooting, and boating.

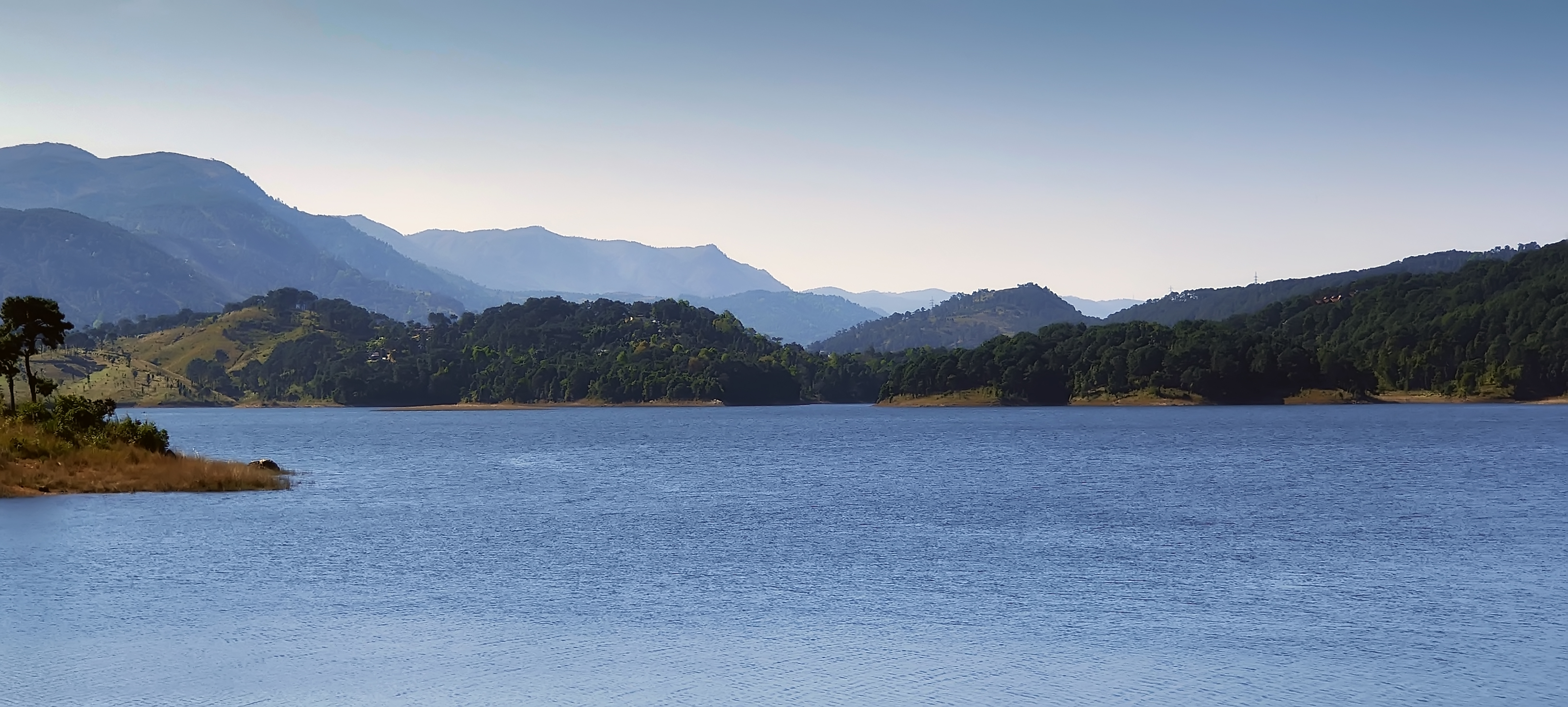
Umïam Lake

== Ecological effect ==
Apart from storing water for electricity generation, the lake also provides numerous ecosystem services at micro, meso and macro levels. Downstream irrigation, fisheries, and drinking water cater to local anthropogenic needs.

== Toxic threat and silting ==
Due to the rising population of Shillong upstream of the lake, the lake is starting to become highly polluted. The rivers, Wah Umkhrah and Wah Umshyrpi, have become drains in Shillong city. They carry household and market sewage, and industrial waste which drains into the lake.

Also, there is the heavy problem of silting. An estimated 40,000 cubic metres (1,400,000 cu ft) of silt enters Umïam Lake every year. Causes range between upstream encroachments, deforestation, blockage of natural drainage systems, and unscientific mining et al. in the catchment area. Excessive silt load in the lake has lowered the storage.

In 2023, the Meghalaya government deployed a solar-powered AI boat to clean Umiam Lake. The AI-integrated marine boat can gather 15 litres of oil and 200 kg of floating refuse daily. The company providing this service, Clearbot, has partnered with the Meghalaya Smart Village Movement (SVM), a collaborative process facilitated by the SVM with the UC Berkeley-Haas Center of Growth Markets to create a Smart Village ecosystem.

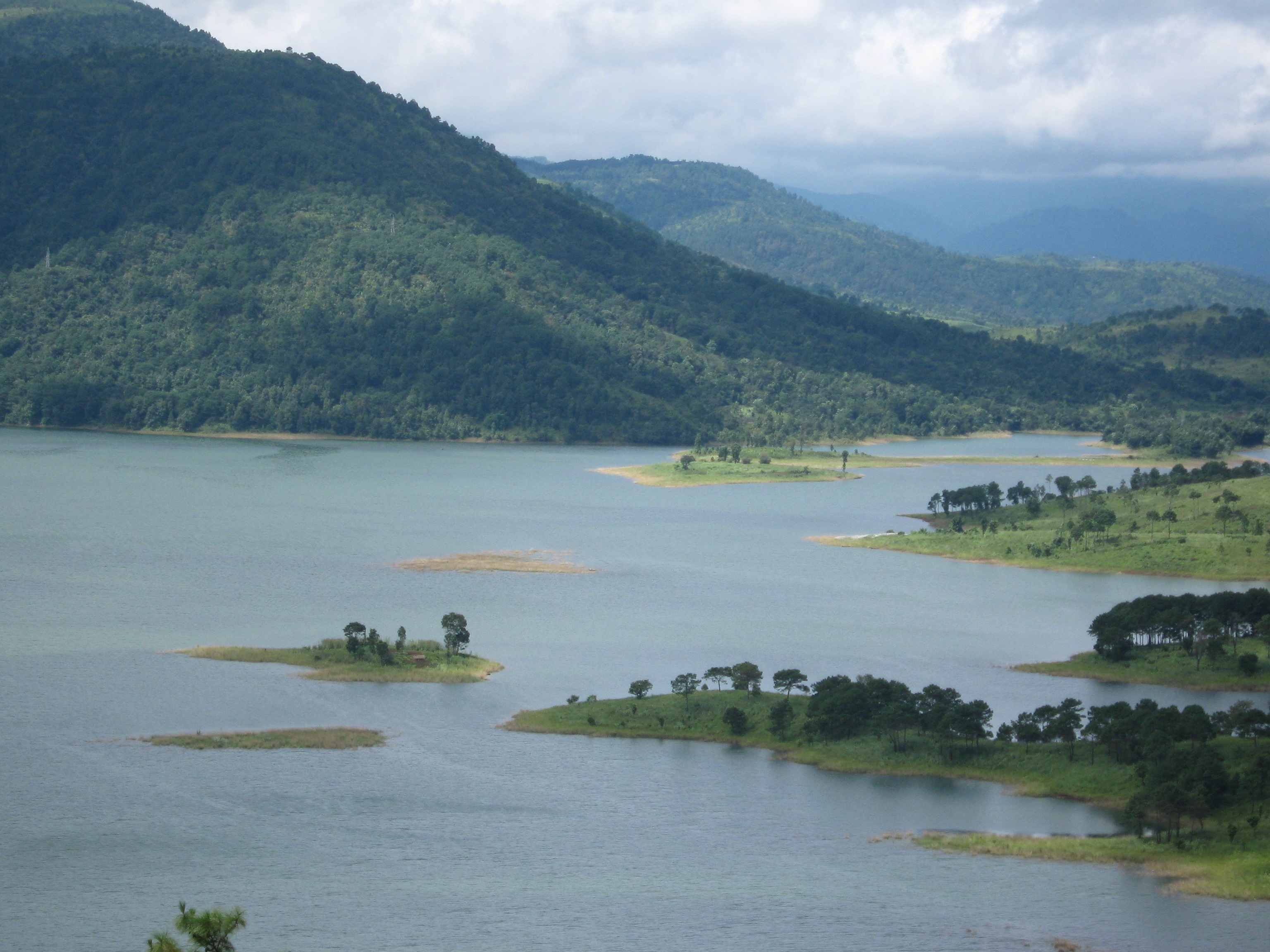
Umïam Lake as seen from Lake View Point in 2022.

== Gallery ==
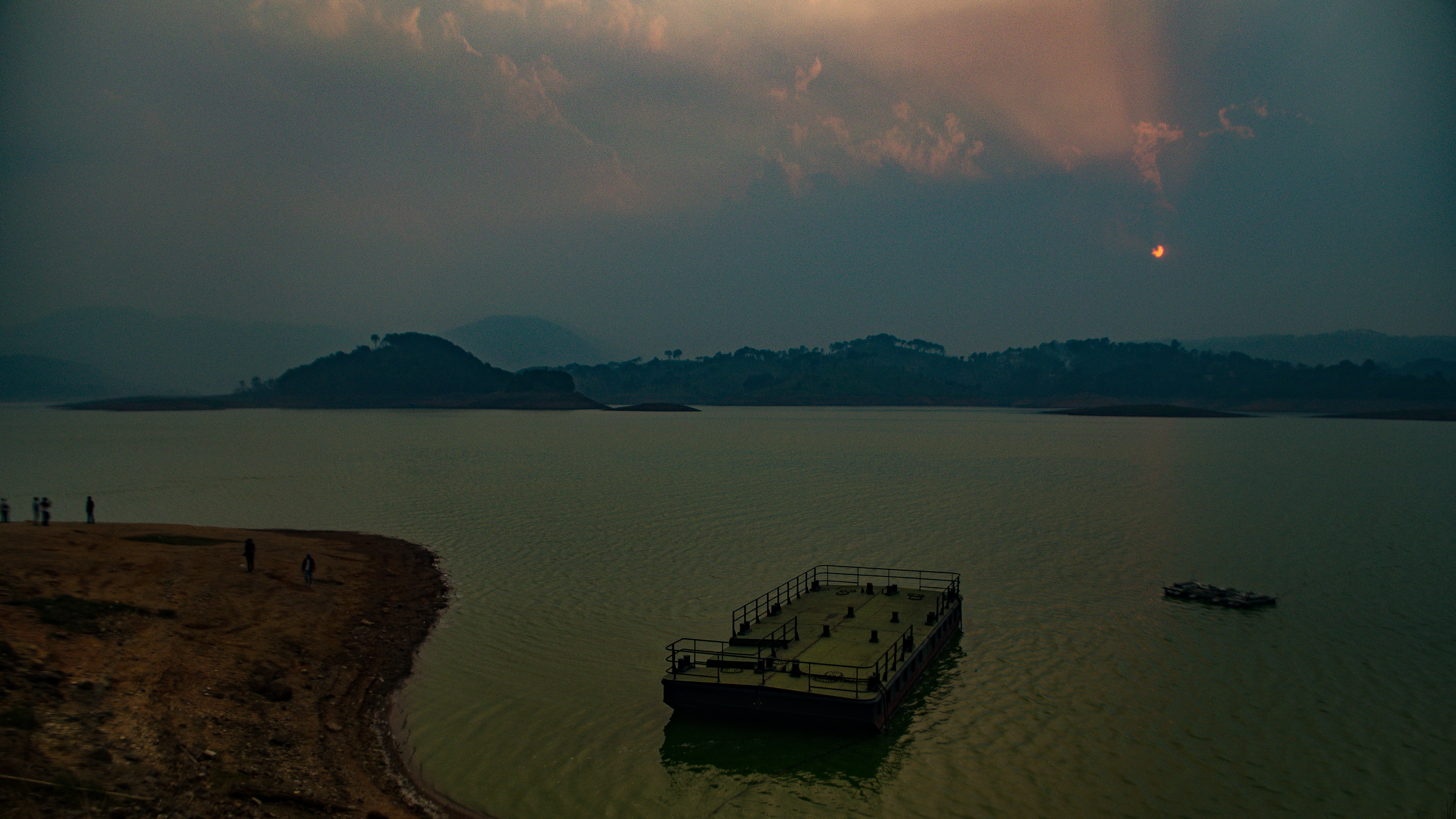
Umïam Lake at Sunset

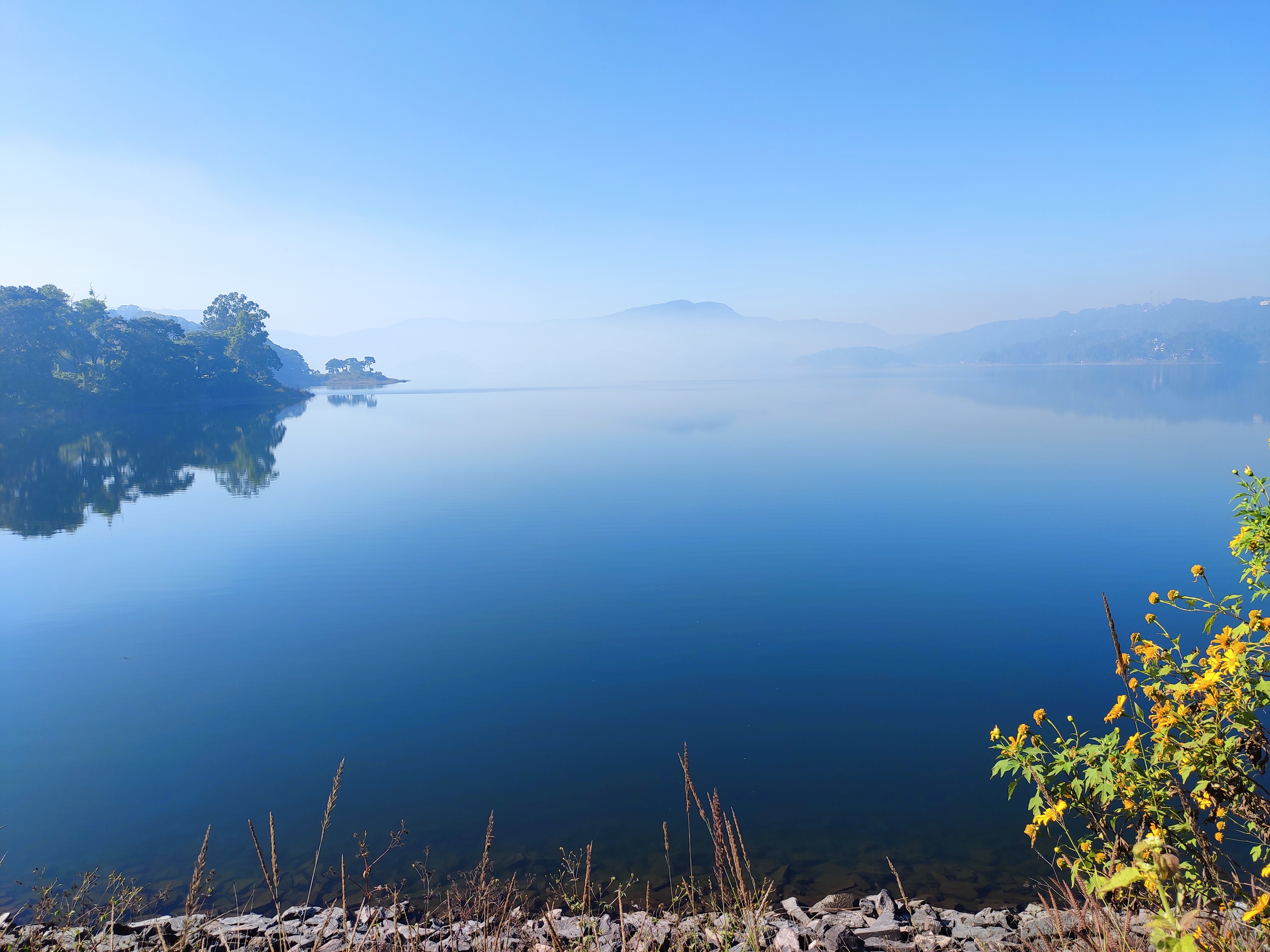
Roadside view of Umïam Lake

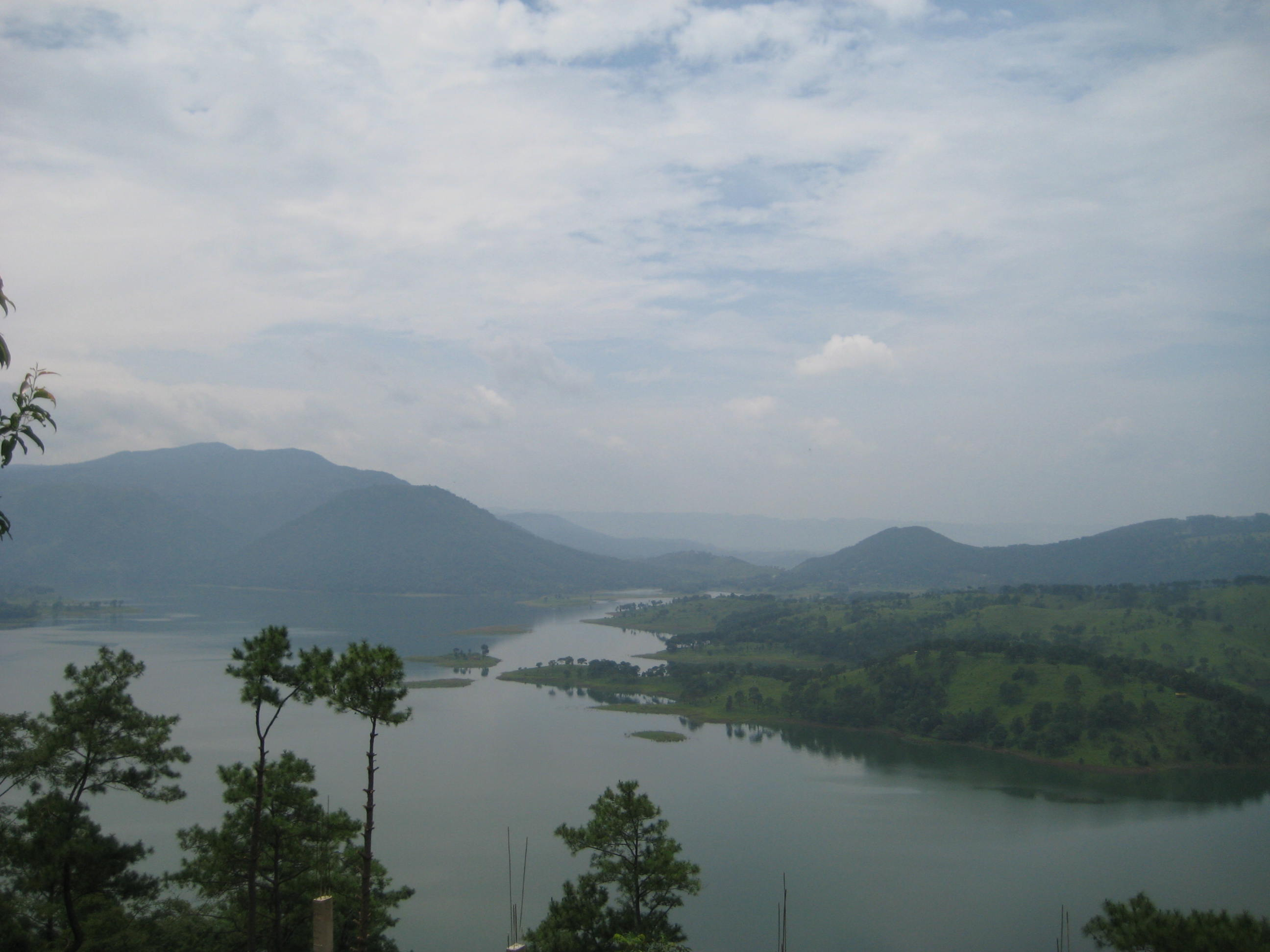
View of Umïam Lake

View of Umïam Lake

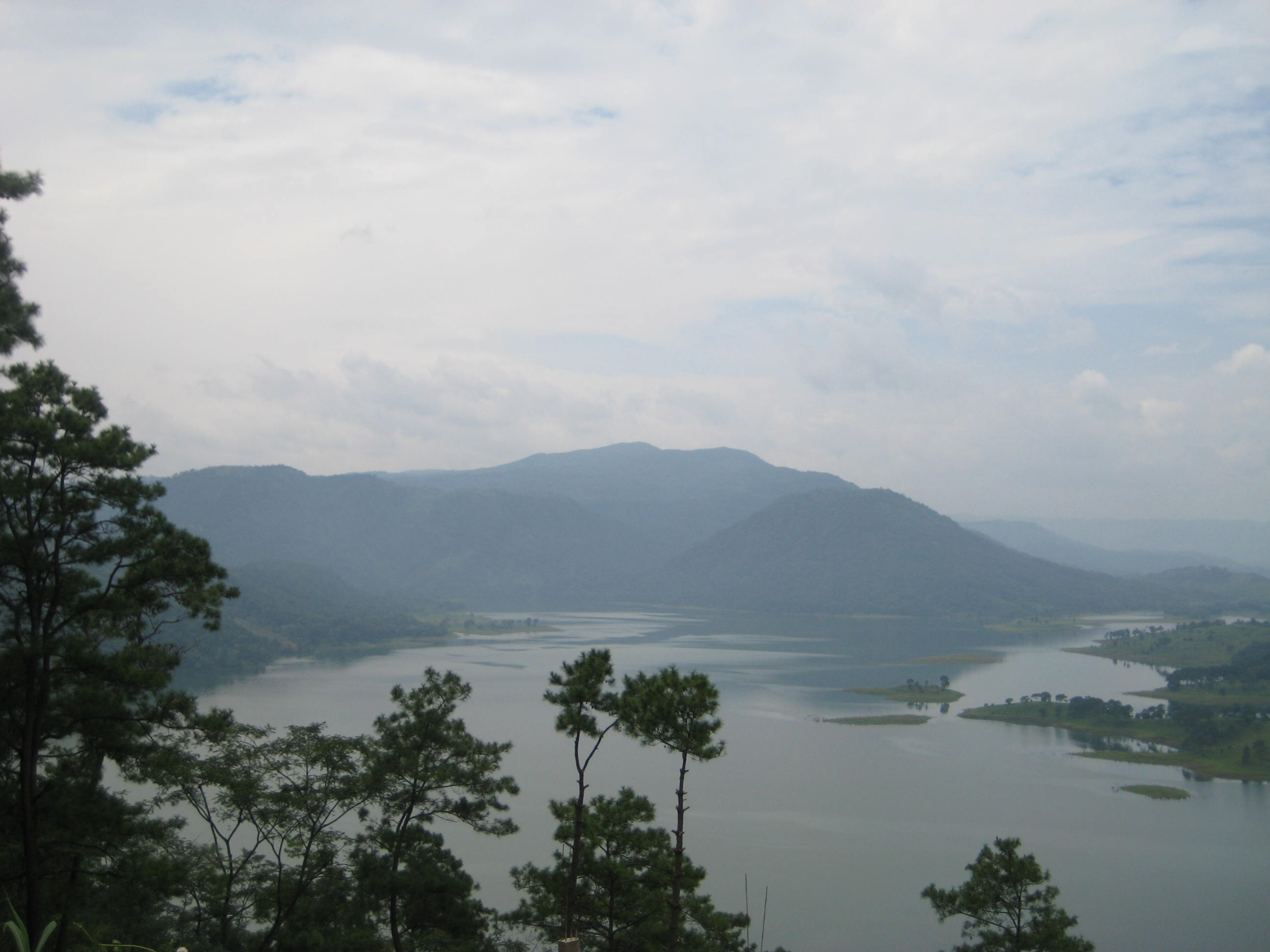
View of Umïam Lake

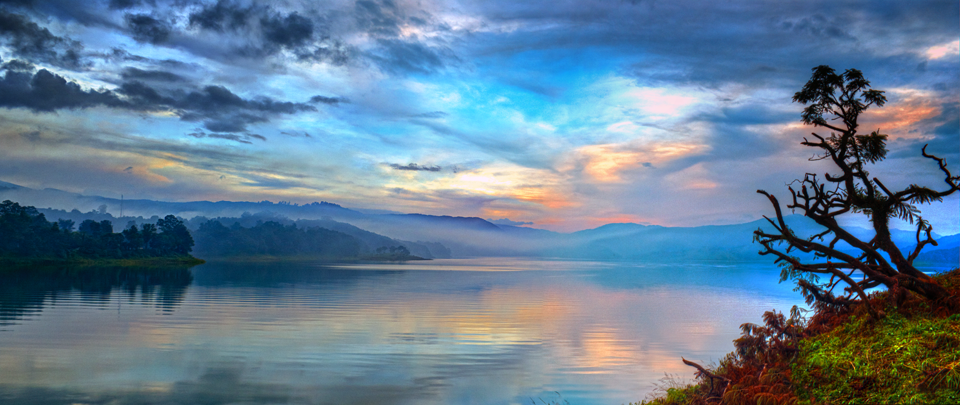
Sunset at Umïam Lake

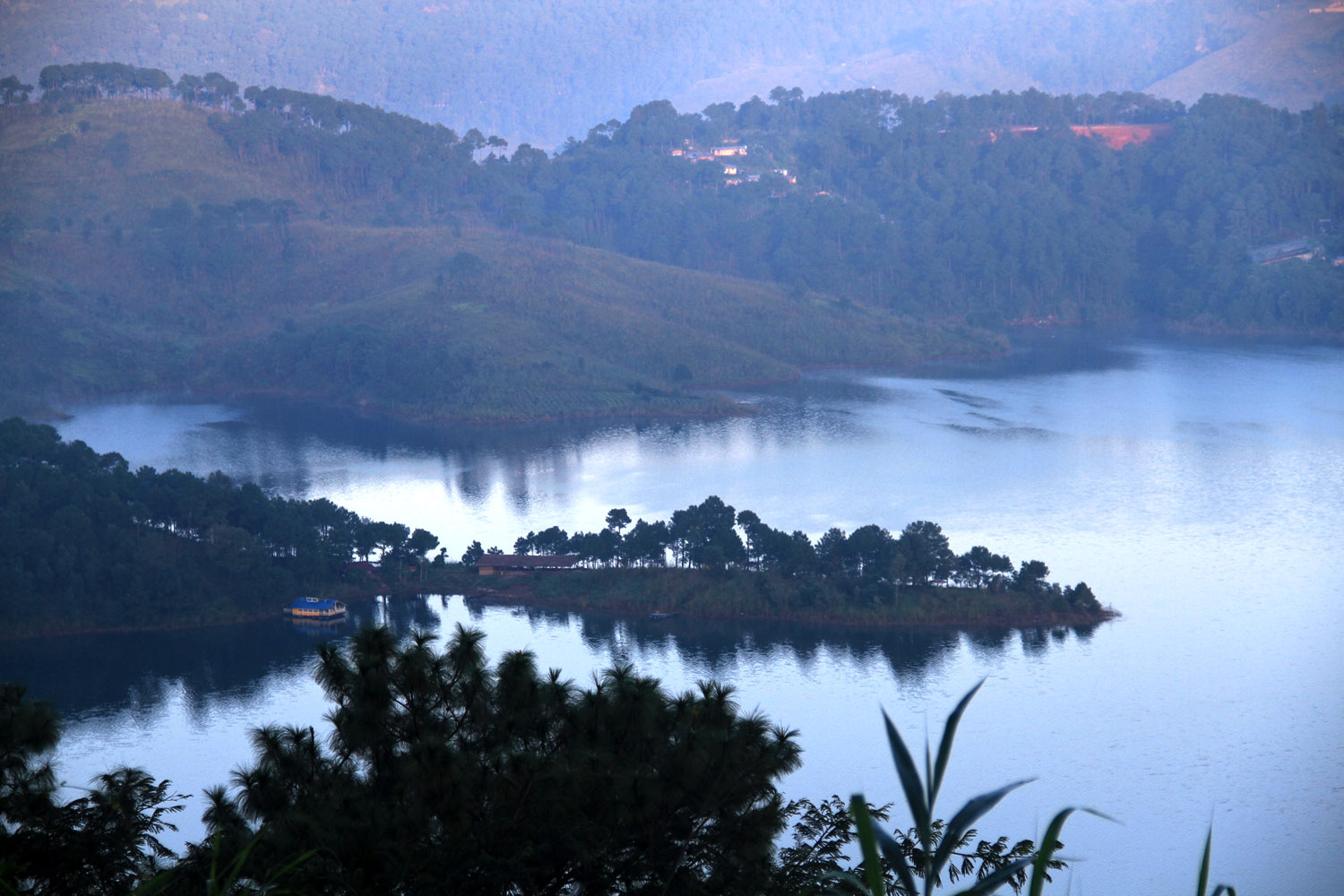
View of Umïam Lake

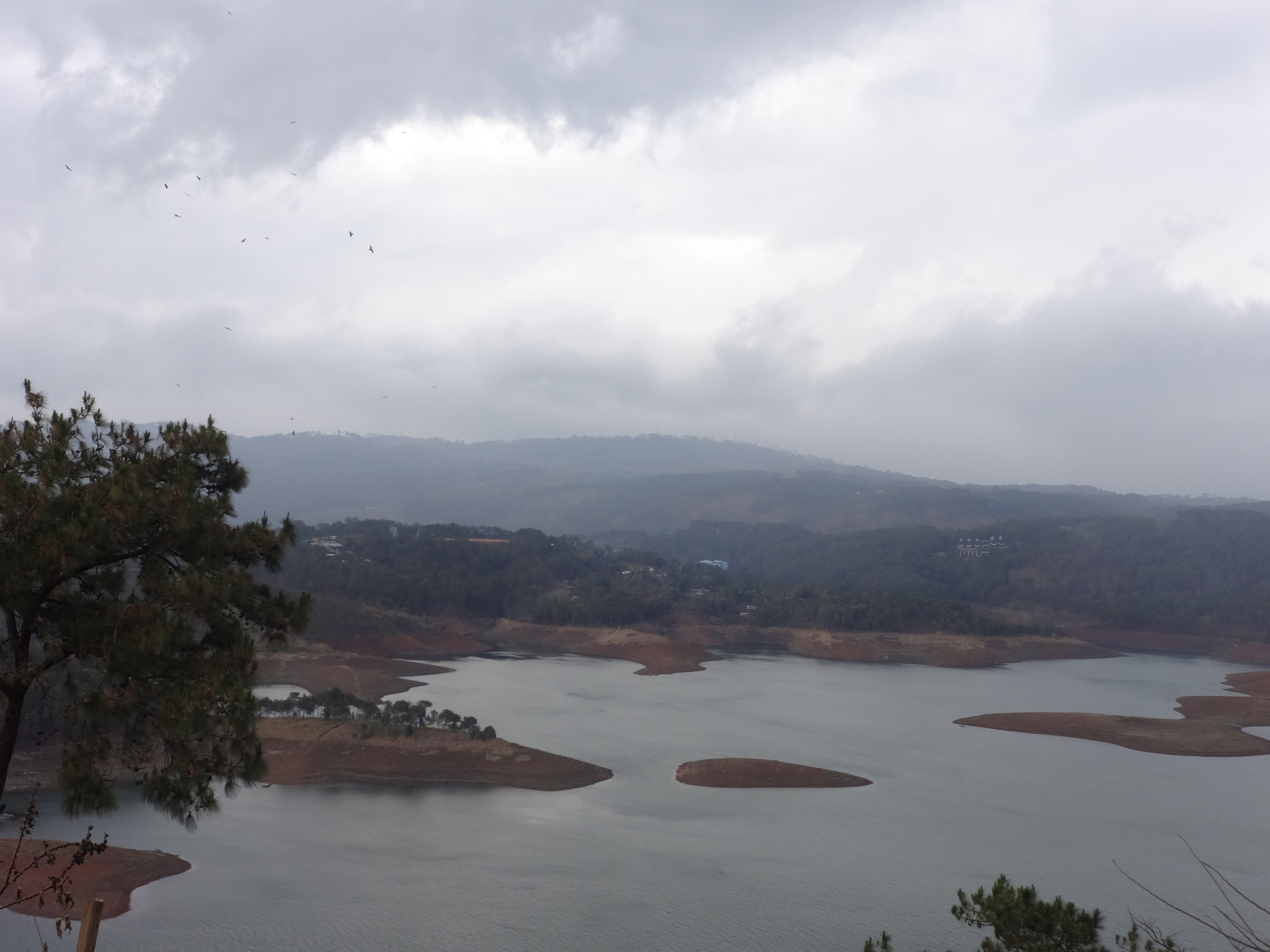
Magnificent Umïam lake

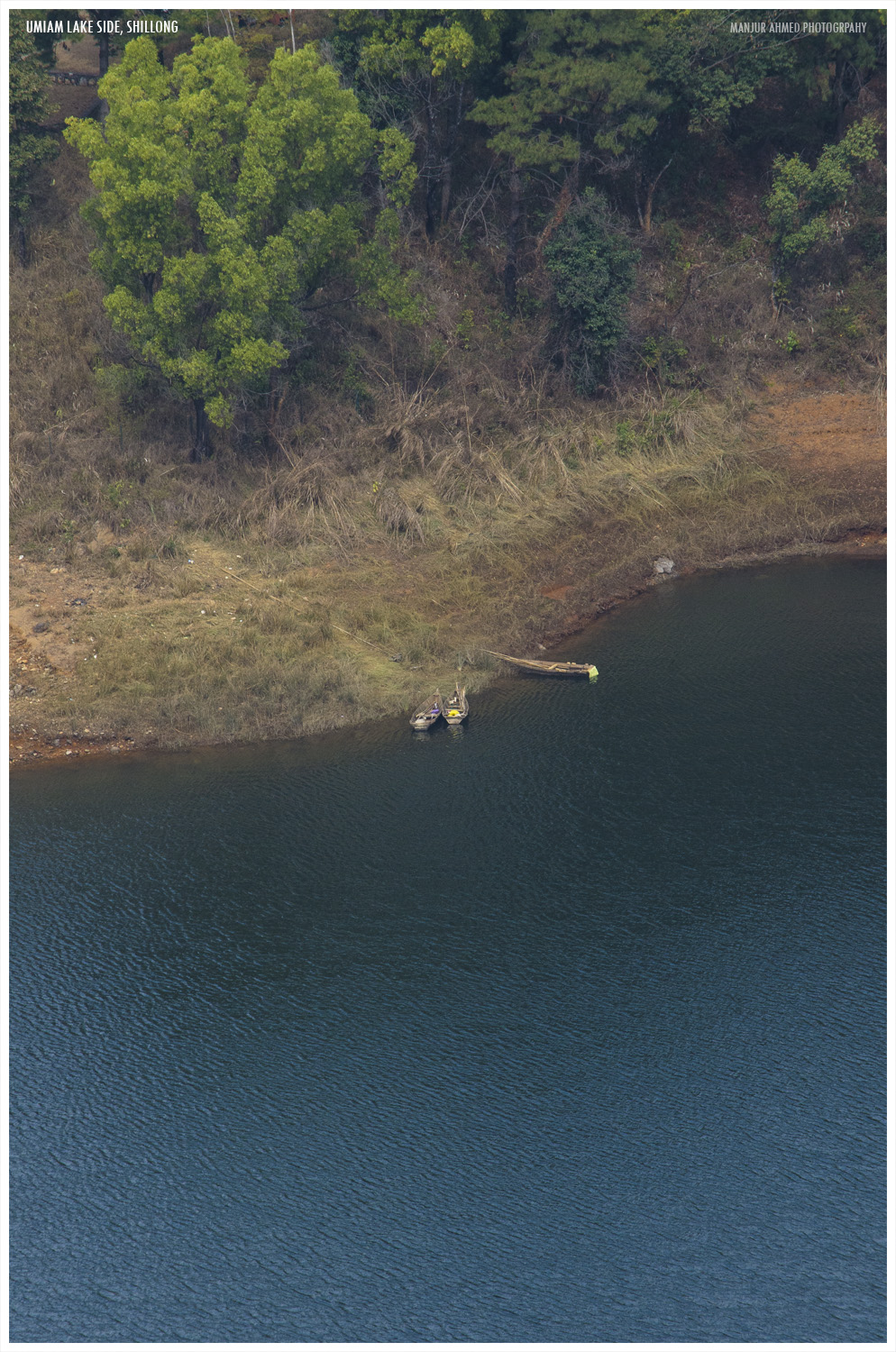
Lakeside boats, Umïam Lake

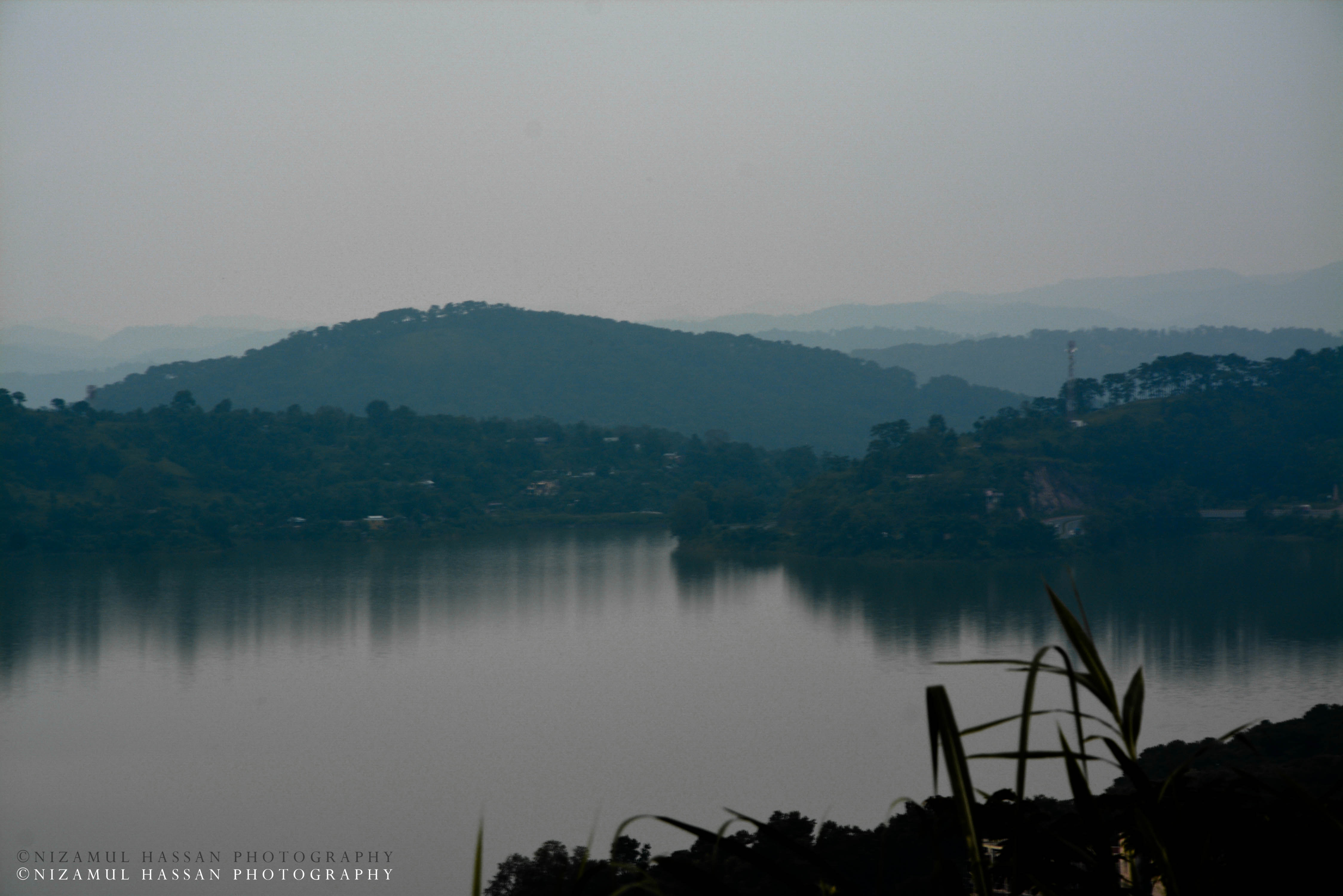
Umïam lake view

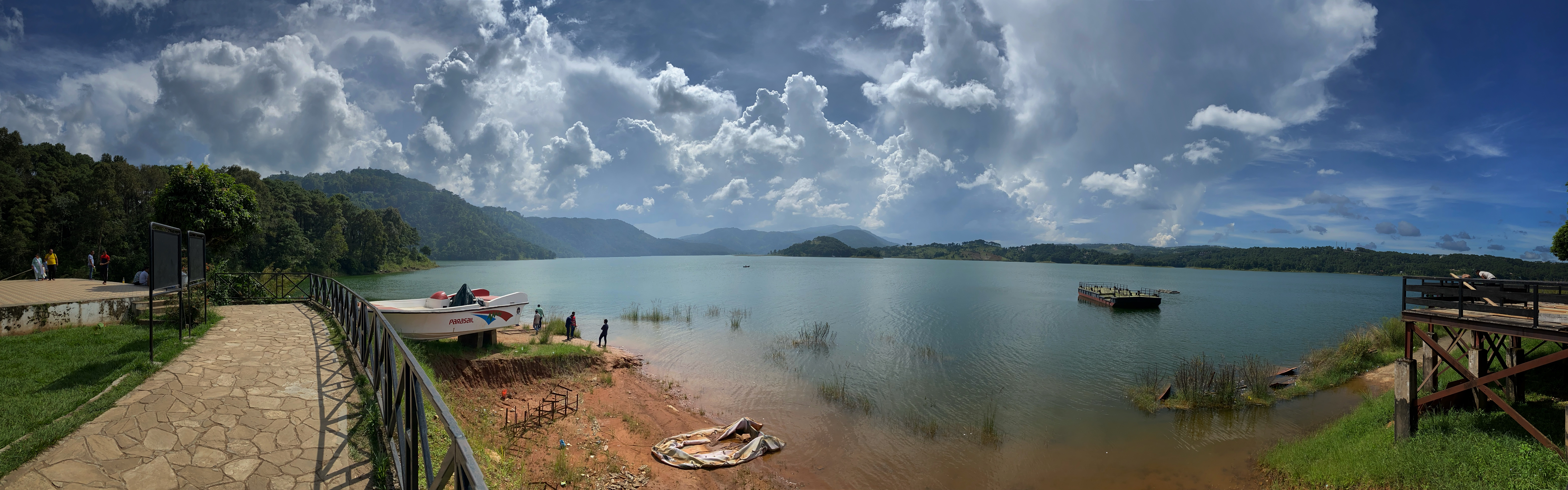
Umïam Lake Panaroma View
