= Kumbalam =

Kumbalam may refer to places in India:

- Kumbalam, Ernakulam, Kerala
- Kumbalam, Kollam, Kerala
- Kumbalam, Krishnagiri, Tamil Nadu
