= Karikuzhi =

- village
- Location in Kerala, India Karikuzhi (India)
- Coordinates: 8.990972°N 76.662598°E
- Country: India
- State: Kerala
- District: Kollam District
- Elevation: 30 m (98 ft)

Languages
  - Official: Malayalam, English
- Time zone: UTC+5:30 (IST)
- PIN: 691503
- Telephone code: 0474
- ISO 3166 code: IN-KL-2 XXXX
- Vehicle registration: KL-02
- Nearest city: Kundara
- Lok Sabha constituency: Kollam
- Climate: Tropical monsoon (Köppen)
- Avg. summer temperature: 35 °C (95 °F)
- Avg. winter temperature: 20 °C (68 °F)

Karikuzhi is a place in Kollam district of Kerala, India. Nearby places are Perayam, Kumbalam, Padappakkara and Kanjiracodu. Karmala Rani Parish Church has been recently renovated. Karikuzhi, Mulavana PIN code is 691503 and the postal head office is Mulavana.

== Demographics ==
Malayalam is the Local Language here.

== Religion ==
Christianity is the main religion in Karikuzhi.

== Geographical Features ==
It is on the bank of the Ashtamudi Lake.
