= Peninsulas and Projections of Ashtamudi Lake =

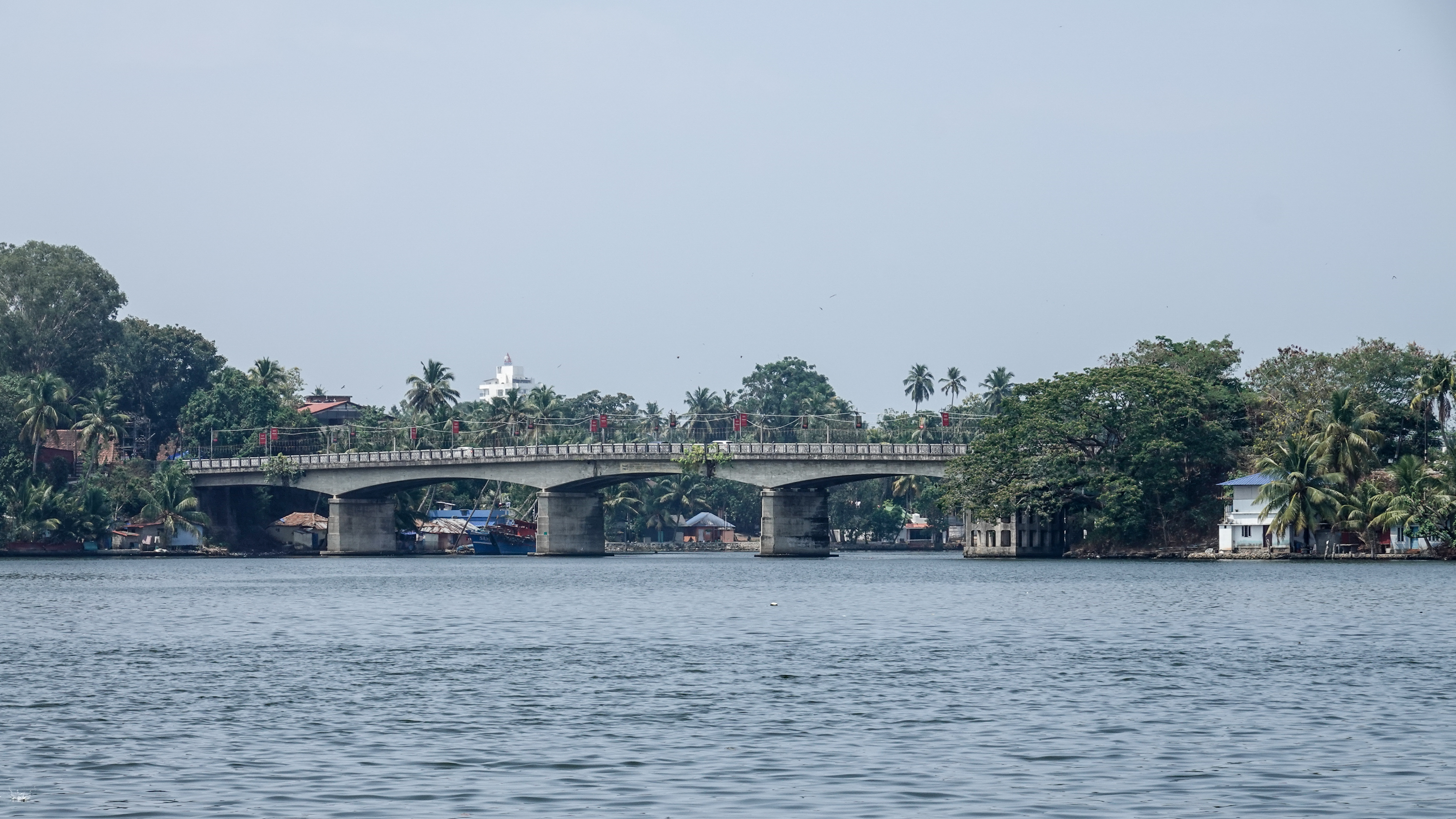
Thevally Bridge Ashtamudi Kollam Mar22 R16 05856

The Peninsulas of Ashtamudi Lake comprise a network of promontories, spits, and land projections extending into Ashtamudi Lake (Malayalam: അഷ്ടമുടിക്കായൽ), the second-largest wetland ecosystem in Kerala, India. In local terminology, a feature that projects outward from the main body of land into an adjacent body of water is called Kodi, while the opposite — a water body that extends inland, creating a recess or coastal indentation bounded by terrestrial features on three sides is called Mudi

== Major Kodis in Ashtamudi Lake ==
Peninsula / Kodi	Geographic Coordinates	Formal Geographical Classification	Micro-Region / Ward	Flanking Aquatic Arms (Mudi)	Key Geographic & Historical Features
Ashramam Peninsula	08°53′45″N 76°35′20″E	Urban Peninsula / Urban Reserve	Kollam Corporation (Ashramam)	Ashramam Mudi & Kandachira Mudi	Historic urban parkland containing the Ashramam Mangrove Park, British Residency, and traditional boat jetty landing.
Ashtamudi Peninsula	08°57′05″N 76°32′50″E	Central Headland / Promontory	Thrikkaruva Panchayat (Ashtamudi)	Ashtamudi Central Basin & Kanjiracode Mudi	The central geographic namesake peninsula of the lake; site of the historic Ashtamudi Sree Krishna Swamy Temple.
Kavanad Peninsula	08°55′40″N 76°33′25″E	Coastal Peninsula / Spit	Kollam Corporation (Kavanad)	Sakthikulangara Arm & Ashtamudi Central Basin	Serves as an urban transit corridor along NH 66; transitional landmass between the sea mouth and interior backwaters.
Kumbalath Peninsula	08°58′55″N 76°34′50″E	Inland Headland	Munrothuruthu / Kundara border	Kumbalath Mudi & Kanjiracode Mudi	Rural peninsula characterized by traditional coir-retting zones, coconut groves, and quiet backwater channels.
Kureeppuzha Peninsula	08°55′15″N 76°34′05″E	Suburban Spit / Estuarine Point	Kollam Corporation (Kureeppuzha)	Kureeppuzha Mudi & Kavanad Arm	Estuarine projection extending into the central lake; known for traditional fishing communities and backwater views.
Mathilil Peninsula	08°55′10″N 76°36′20″E	Suburban Promontory	Kollam Corporation (Mathilil)	Kandachira Mudi & West Kallada Arm	High-density suburban landmass extending into the eastern bay of Ashtamudi Lake.
Padappakkara Peninsula	08°58′05″N 76°38′10″E	Inland Estuarine Peninsula	Mulavana / Chittumala Region	Kanjiracode Mudi & Chittumala Waterway	Historic eastern peninsula jutting into Kanjiracode Lake; site of ancient Christian heritage settlements and clay brick manufacturing.
Perumon Peninsula	08°58′10″N 76°36′05″E	Riverine Peninsula / Estuarine Headland	Panayam Panchayat (Perumon)	Perumon Mudi & Kallada River Estuary	Located near the mouth of the Kallada River; site of the historic Perumon railway bridge and agricultural backwater settlements.
Prakkulam Peninsula (Sambranikodi)	08°57′22″N 76°34′10″E	Estuarine Spit / Deltaic Cape	Thrikkaruva Panchayat (Prakkulam)	Kanjiracode Mudi & Ashtamudi Central Basin	Features Sambranikodi at its southern tip; major hub for eco-tourism, shallow-water clam beds, and mangrove conservation.
Sakthikulangara Spit	08°56′05″N 76°32′15″E	Barrier Spit / Barrier Peninsula	Sakthikulangara Ward	Arabian Sea (West) & Ashtamudi Estuary Mouth (East)	Low-lying coastal spit guarding the Neendakara Azhi (sea opening); major marine fishing harbor and shipping channel.
Sinkarappalli Peninsula	08°58′40″N 76°37′25″E	Inland Promontory	Perayam / Kundara Region	Kanjiracode Mudi & Perayam Arm	Quiet agricultural projection in the eastern branch of the lake, known for clay deposits and mangrove fringes.
Thevally Peninsula	08°54′15″N 76°34′48″E	Urban Peninsula / Promontory	Kollam Corporation (Thevally)	Thevally Mudi & Kandachira Mudi	Site of the 19th-century Thevally Palace; dense residential zone jutting into central Ashtamudi.
Vellimon Peninsula	08°59′10″N 76°35′40″E	Estuarine Headland	Kundara Region (Vellimon)	Perumon Mudi & Kallada River Branch	Northern peninsula situated near the entrance of Munroe Island; prominent agricultural and inland fisheries area.
