= Don Bosco Church, North Paravur =

Church building in India

Coordinates: 10.14715°N 76.21618°E

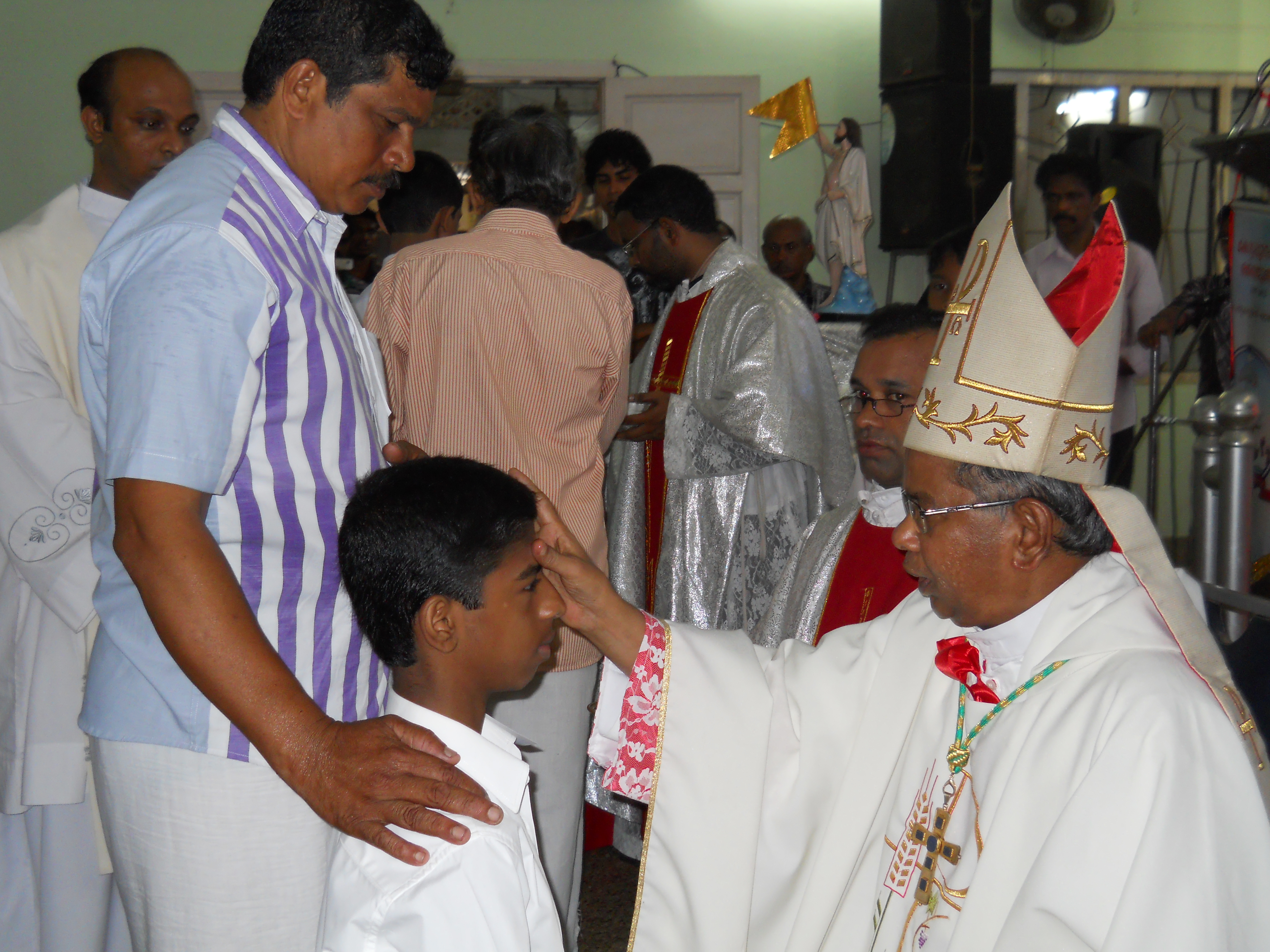
Confirmation ceremony at Don Bosco Church

Don Bosco Church at North Paravur, Kerala, is a church of Paravur Parish under the Roman Catholic (Latin) Diocese of Kottappuram.

Situated near Perumpadanna Junction at Paravur-Cherai road, this is one of the few churches in India named after Don Bosco. The Church is a pilgrim site due to the many sightings of sacred blood stains on a pedestal bronze oil lamp (Nilavilakku). Thousands of devotees of all religions attend the Novena of The Sacred Heart on Fridays. The blessed oil from the lamp is believed to possess miraculous healing power. Thanksgiving letters and offerings by the devotees are the testimonials of this Divine Intervention.

== Hosting of relics ==
On 30 September 2011, the relic of Don Bosco which was on a world tour (arranged by Salasian Fathers from Italy) was received at Don Bosco Church, North Paravur and was venerated by thousands.

A relic of Saint Faustina, a Polish nun who was canonized in 2000 was brought to Don Bosco Church on 11 January 2013 by Ms. Joy Hunt and her associate Mr. Ian Gaudery. They were visiting from Australia on a tour to spread devotion to the Divine Mercy ignited by Saint Faustina. The relic was received by Rev. Fr. Jackson and placed at the altar for veneration. Mr. Ian Gaudery gave a speech to the devotees. He said "the Divine Mercy devotion was ignited by Saint Faustina, whose diary is one of the great sources of valuable, mystical and spiritual writings the Catholic Church possesses." They were also accompanied by a Buddhist convert, Maria Tine from Singapore.

== Annual events ==
The annual feast of the patron saint is celebrated in the months of January and February. The major festival is the celebration of Sacred Heart of Jesus in the month of June. A Bible Convention is also arranged for spiritual meditation before this celebration. Adoration of the Virgin Mary is held in November with month-long Rosary Prayers in every parish houses and family units. A Rosary Procession is taken out through the town to mark the conclusion.

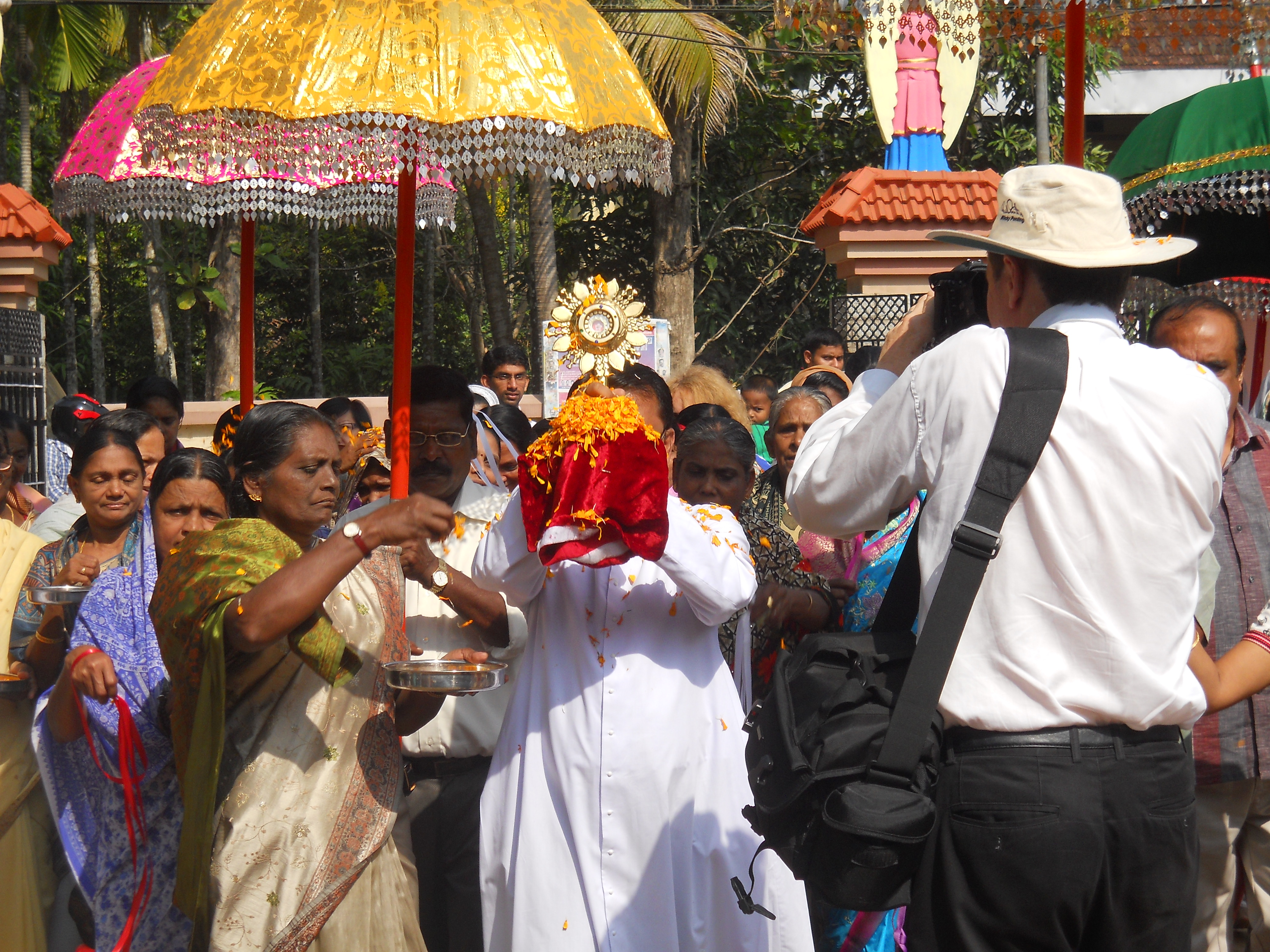
Relic of Saint Mary Faustina received at Don Bosco Church by Vicar Rev Fr Jackson Valiyaparambil

The 2012 celebration was inaugurated with flag hoisting by Rt Rev Dr Joseph Karikkassery, Bishop of Kottappuram Diocese on 15 June. On the day of Celebration on 17 June, around 700 Presidents ("Prasudenti" in local vernacular) took out a procession at 9:30 am followed by Holy Mass consecrated by Rev Fr Fransico Padamadan. The "Word of the Lord" was conveyed by notable biblicist and orator Rev Fr. Nelson Job. Around 12,000 devotees participated in the celebration. There are about 500 families under the church's jurisdiction. Fr. Jackson Valiyaparambil is the vicar.
