= Samuel Rayan =

Indian Jesuit theologian (1920–2019)

Samuel Rayan SJ
- Born: 23 July 1920; Kumbalam, Kollam District, Kerala, India
- Died: 2 January 2019 (aged 98); Nirmala Hospital, Kozhikode, Kerala, India
- Education: De Nobili College, Pune, Rome
- Occupations: Theologian, Priest
- Notable work: The Holy Spirit: Heart of the Gospel and Christian Hope (1978); Collected writings of Samuel Rayan, SJ (2013)

Samuel Rayan SJ (23 July 1920 – 2 January 2019) was an Indian Jesuit and liberation theologian.

== Biography ==
Rayan was born in the village of Kumbalam in Kollam District, Kerala into a family of eight children (2 girls and 6 boys).

Rayan joined the Jesuit novitiate in 1939 and was ordained Catholic priest in 1955, taking his final vows as a Jesuit in 1958. He devoted many years to the study of Malayalam literature, mastered Sanskrit, and was well read in Indian religions and philosophy. He completed his theological studies in De Nobili College in Pune, before his doctorate in Rome.

He died on 2 January 2019 at the age of 98 in Nirmala Hospital, Kozhikode in Kerala where he was undergoing old age ailments.

== Theology ==
Rayan was convinced that the human person in community is the object of God's special love. His theology highlights a need for care of the earth, concern for life, and commitment to people.

According to Rayan, theology is a reminder of the great demands of the Kingdom of God. For Rayan, the central mission of the Christian faith is its insertion into the concrete and daily life of the people, especially of the most marginalized and oppressed members of the social body. As Rayan says, "Rice is for sharing, bread must be broken and given. Every bowl, every belly shall have its fill, to leave a single bowl unfilled is to rob history of its meaning; to grab many a bowl for myself is to empty history of God."

== Works ==
- Rayan, Samuel (1978). The Holy Spirit: Heart of the Gospel and Christian Hope. Maryknoll, NY: Orbis Books. ISBN 978-0883441886. OCLC 3706609.
- Rayan, Samuel (2013). Kunnumpuram, Kurien (ed.). Collected writings of Samuel Rayan, SJ. New Delhi: ISPCK. ISBN 9788184653335. OCLC 877930877.
