= Onambalam =

- Village
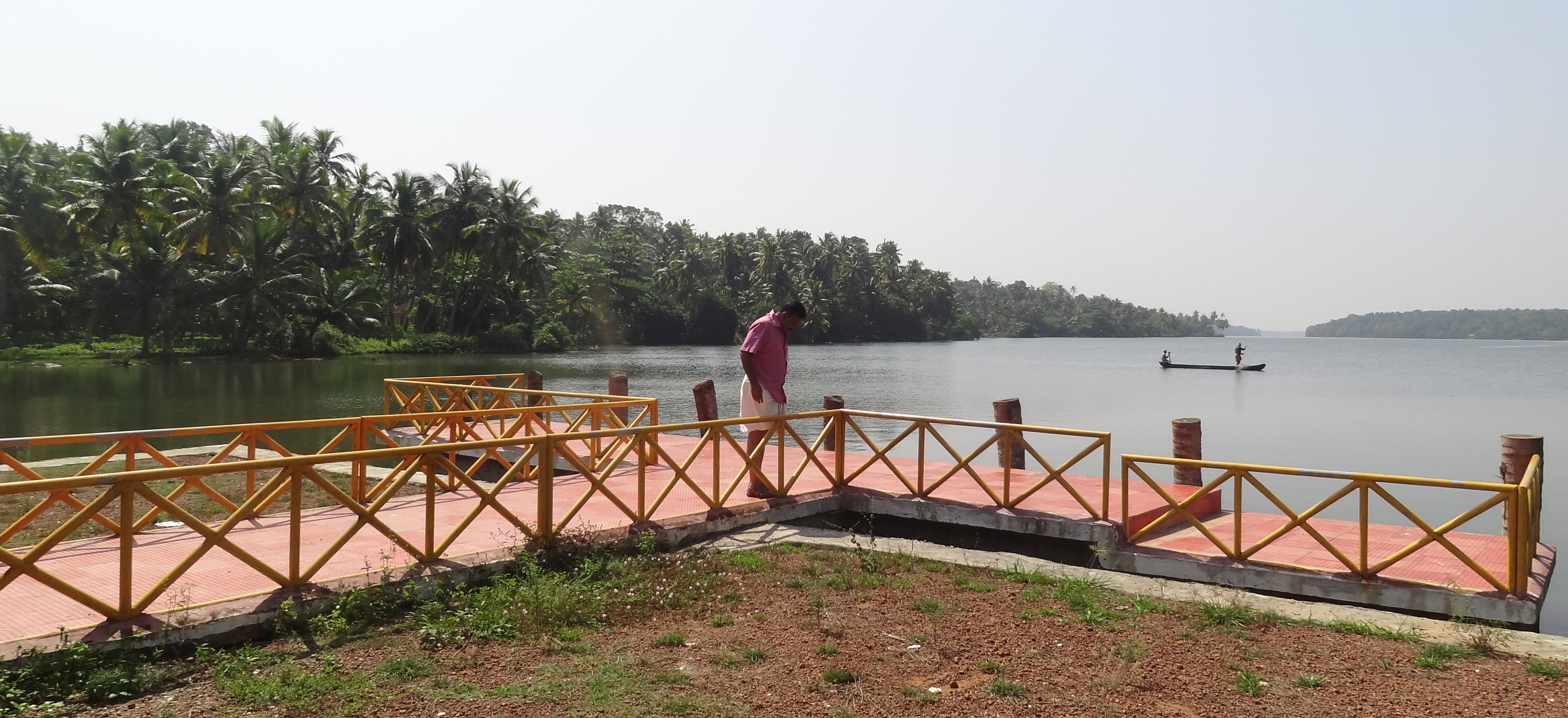
- Interactive map of Onambalam
- Coordinates: 8.998009°N 76.668777°E
- Country: India
- State: Kerala
- District: Kollam
- Elevation: 4 m (13 ft)

Languages
  - Official: Malayalam, English
- Time zone: UTC+5:30 (IST)
- PIN: 691 503
- Telephone code: 0474

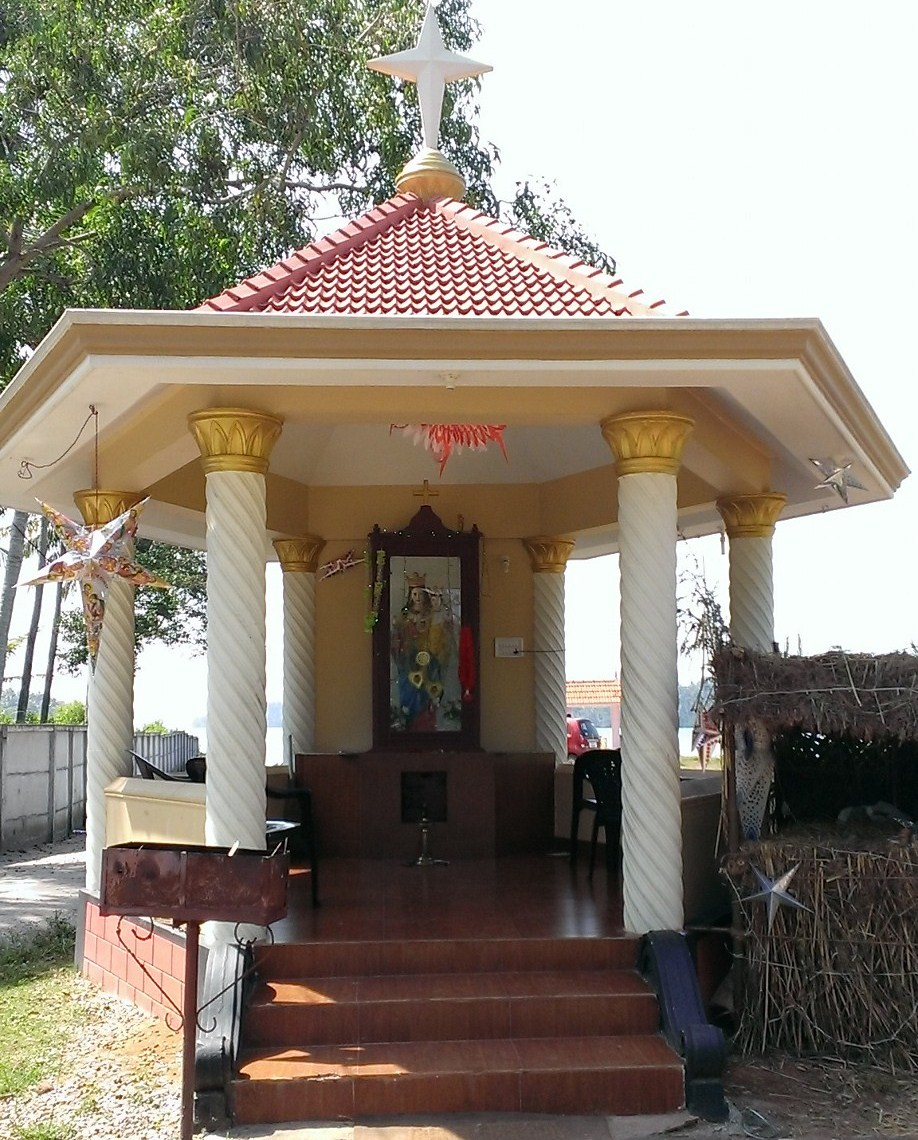
Onambalam Harbour

Onambalam is a small inland fishing and trading harbour in Kumbalam, Kollam, India on the shore of Ashtamudi lake. With improvements in road transport its prominence has reduced after 1980s and now it is used as a fish market and a harbour for small inland fishing vessels. A boat race was organized from here during 28th day of Onam every year in the past but has not been conducted in recent years.

The harbour land is owned by St. Michael's Church and features a grotto of Mother Mary; a scenic view of Ashtamudi lake is possible from here.

== History ==
The name Onambalam is derived from two Malayalam words: ഒന്നു (onnu—one) and അമ്പലം (ambalam—temple). The area got its name since it is one mile away from Chittumala Durga Devi Temple. It was an important coir and cashew trading centre, and there was boat service to Kollam originating here. As inland water transport lost prominence the harbour was abandoned, but certain steps are made to improve inland navigation. A new boat jetty was built by Kollam District Tourism Promotion Council and District Panchayat. A shrine to Our lady Help of Christians is situated in Onambalam Landing Centre, built by Salesians of Donbosco priests who served in Kumbalam parish. Onambalam is a tourism destination near Kollam Technopark located in Kundara. The nearest railway station is Kundara, which is 13 km (8.1 mi) from Kollam. Onambalam can be reached by road from Kundara or Chittumala.

== Recent developments ==
A new small boat jetty has been constructed here as part of the Ashtamudi Tourism Circuit.
