= Kottappuram, Kollam =

Kottappuram
- Village
- Location in Kerala, India Kottappuram (India)
- Coordinates: 8.998009°N 76.668777°E
- Country: India
- State: Kerala
- District: Kollam
- Elevation: 30 m (98 ft)

Languages
  - Official: Malayalam, English
- Time zone: UTC+5:30 (IST)
- PIN: 691 503
- Telephone code: 0474
- Vehicle registration: KL-2
- Sex ratio: 1069 ♂/♀

Kottappuram is a part of the village Perayam in the Kollam District, situated in Indian State of Kerala. It has a population of nearly 3000. It spreads across the 7 and 8th ward of the Perayam panchayath. To the north it is bordered by Chittumala Chira ("chira" means "small lake" in Malayalam), to the west by Onambalam Cut (an abandoned irregational project for a deep short canal to divert flood water from Chittumala Chira to Ashthamudi Lake), to the east by Chokkamkuzhi and to the south by Kollam - Theni National Highway.

The name indicates that the place is after the fort (kotta - fort, appuram - otherside), which was standing until the late 1960s, but was demolished for building Onambalam Cut. The mud fort was used by the local Mathilakam dynasty in the British era. Kottappuram is believed to have been settled by the first half of the 18th century.

Kottappuram is a stronghold of the Communist Party of India (CPI), and is currently represented by John J L (7th ward) of the [INC] and S Syam Communist party of India (CPM) (8th ward). The local Catholic church has some influence in politics.

The community is almost entirely Latin Catholic and attends the Christ the King Church of Kollam diocese. Vicar of the church is Rev. Fr Jose Lazer.

Men work in government jobs, as migrant workers in Gulf countries and as construction workers. The bulk of the employment for women comes from nearby cashew factories and through a national rural employment guarantee scheme. Economic participation by women is high, and women tend to be more educated than men.

Kundara Pallimukku - Chittumala road passes through Kottappuram and Kollam - Theni National high pass through South boundary. It is about 6 kilometres from Kundara Pallimukku and about 18 kilometres from Kollam city via National Highway.
