= Kumbalam, Kollam =

Kumbalam
- place
- Location in Kerala, India Kumbalam (India)
- Coordinates: 8.991990°N 76.662083°E
- Country: India
- State: Kerala
- District: Kollam
- Elevation: 30 m (98 ft)

Population (2001)
  - Total: 4,000

Languages
  - Official: Malayalam, English
- Time zone: UTC+5:30 (IST)
- PIN: 691 503
- Telephone code: 0474
- ISO 3166 code: IN-KL-2 XXXX
- Vehicle registration: KL-02
- Nearest city: Kundara
- Lok Sabha constituency: Kollam
- Climate: Tropical monsoon (Köppen)
- Avg. summer temperature: 35 °C (95 °F)
- Avg. winter temperature: 20 °C (68 °F)

Kumbalam, is a place in Kollam, Kerala, India. It has a population of around 4,000 and is a part of Perayam grama panchayat. It is in the bank of Astamudi lake and houses an international school. Nearby places are Karikuzhi, Kottappuram and Perayam.

== Education ==
International School

St. Joseph International Academy follows the Indian Certificate of Secondary Education (ICSE) syllabus. The school is owned and operated by the Valiavila Foundation, a registered charitable trust led by Dr. Joseph D Fernandez.

Higher Secondary School

St. Michael's Vocational Higher Secondary School

Lower Primary School

St. Mary's Lower Primary School

== Library ==
Kumbalam has had a public library since 1951.

== Religion ==
Kumbalam is one of the biggest parishes under Quilon Diocese. St. Michael's Church in Kumbalam is the second largest church in Quilon Diocese. Fr. Lucas Fernandez, Fr. Tobias Fernandez, Msgr Charles M Fernandez, Fr. Dr. Stanislaus M Fernandez SDB, Rev. Dr. Samuel Ryan SJ, Teacher Angelus M Fernandez, Dr.Joseph D Fernandez, Prof. KS Peter, and Prof. S Varghese are from Kumbalam.

== Hospital ==
Primary Health Centre
