= Sambranikodi Island =

Island in Kerala, India

Coordinates: 8°55′43″N 76°34′04″E

Sambranikodi Island is a landmass situated in the Ashtamudi backwaters of Kollam district, Kerala, India. The island is situated approximately 10 kilometers away from the main city of Kollam. The village falls in the area of ward 13 of Thrikkaruva grama panchayat and is at the southern tip of Prakkulam. The island in the lake can be accessed from Sambranikodi in mainland via boats services.

== History ==
It was along this coast that large ships from China anchored in the past. Local people referred to these ships as 'chambranam' and the place came to be known as Sambranikodi. References to Chambranam can be seen in Unnuneelisandesham.

Sambrani Island was formed when soil dredged for work related to the national waterway was piled up in backwaters. The narrow patch of land popped up a few years ago in the Ashtamudi Lake about 350m away from the Sambranikodi coast and it became a complete isle after soil dredged for the construction of the national highway was dumped in the backwaters.

The distance from Sambranikodi to the island is around 400 m, and according to fishers and residents, only a 50-m stretch has considerable depth.
