= Kumbalam, Krishnagiri =

Coordinates: 12°46′15″N 78°02′50″E

Kumbalam
- village
- Interactive map of Kumbalam
- Country: India
- State: Tamil Nadu
- District: Krishnagiri

Languages
  - Official: Tamil
- Time zone: UTC+5:30 (IST)

Kumbalam is a village in the Hosur taluk of Krishnagiri district, Tamil Nadu, India.
