= Padappakkara =

Padappakara Padappakara
- village
- Location in Kerala, India Padappakara (India)
- Coordinates: 8°58′0″N 76°38′0″E
- Country: India
- State: Kerala
- District: Kollam
- Elevation: 30 m (98 ft)

Population (2001)
  - Total: 30,000

Languages
  - Official: Malayalam, English
- Time zone: UTC+5:30 (IST)
- PIN: 691 503
- Telephone code: 0474
- ISO 3166 code: IN-KL-2 XXXX
- Vehicle registration: KL-02
- Nearest city: Kollam City (23 km)
- Lok Sabha constituency: Kollam
- Climate: Tropical monsoon (Köppen)
- Avg. summer temperature: 35 °C (95 °F)
- Avg. winter temperature: 20 °C (68 °F)

Padappakkara is a village in the Kollam district of Kerala, India.

Between 1400 AD to 1850 AD the village was used as a safe harbour during monsoons by the wooden merchant and naval ships. It includes areas like Kochupoika, Nellimukku, Kaithamunampu, Thekkeyattam, Kuthiramunambu, Thenguvila, N.S Nagar and Aanappara, Pulliakkody, Fathima Junction, Aasante poika, Kanmukhathu Kody, Anchumoolapoika, Chanakkody, Chonkil, Valathil, Poolakkody, and Valyandakkal.

Padappakkara is the birthplace of Sri Manappoikayil Thampi Sir, Shri Antony Neeklos, Shri V.B. Lawarance, Shri Babu Augustine (author of Padakkapal), and stage artist Shri A. P. Francis.

Its the part of Perayam grama panchayath.

== Toponymy ==
The name Padappakkara derives from the name Pada-Kappal-Kara, which means 'naval ship yard'.

== History ==
The Malayalam-language book Padakkappal, written by Mr. Babu Augustine, elaborates on the history and myth of Padappakara. As written in Padakkappal, the land was given as a gift to a magician by the king of Travancore due to his great work to save the kingdom. Mr. Babu Augustine mentions that many of the details about Padappakara came from Kadayaattu Veedu. Padappakkara was largely an unpopulated area until the 1880s. Mass migration started in the late 1950s. Many areas in Padappakkara now resemble a suburb. The initial immigrants to Padappakara were farmers, building labourers and fishermen from neighboring areas like Kumbalam, Kallada, Mandrothuruth, Chemmakadu, Vellimon, Perayam, Mulavana, and Kanjirode. Comparatively low land prices were the driving factor behind the immigration. The immigration caused several struggles among the families up to 1986. After that, it converted into a political struggle up to 2005. As per 1981 census, most people in Padappakkara obtained minimum graduates, and most of the girls were post-graduates. This area was donated to 'Kadayattu Unnithan' by Veluthambi Thelava' without land tax.

== Shipyard ==
The naval base shipyard here is from before Christ, {citation needed|date=October 2015} and the shipyard functioned on southern side of Padappakara were found channakkallu. Hence this place is also known as Chana-Kodi. Today Sundara-Theeram Resort operates on the opposite side of Palm Lagoon Resort. Boating facilities are also available, and the southern side of Padakappal-kkara has the largest depth in the Ashtamudi lake made by natural ship-yard. Arabians, finishers and Yehudi were made large number of ship from Padappakara towards France, Italy, Germany and England.

Naval base ships landed at Pada-Poika in between Nellimukkam-Parapuram and Kuthiramunambu Padappamatel- Anhumalapoika for fighting in the first phase against enemies towards Neendakara and Thankassery. Padappakara is the east highest place in the Ashtamudi lake.

== Amenities ==
Hospital

GHD Padappakara is a primary health clinic run by the government.

== Education ==
There are three schools. St. Joseph's High School (government - Aided), run by the Catholic Church, it is the main school in Padappakara. There is a government LP school in Padappakara (NS Nagar). There is also an English-medium primary school run by the Congregation of Teresian Carmelites.

== Economy ==
Many people work in government service. Remittance from family members working abroad, marginal farming and fishing are the main pillars of the economy. The tourism industry is in a nascent stage, with a couple of lake resorts.

== Religion ==
Almost all residents are Latin Catholics. In 1963 Padappakara became a parish under the Diocese of Quilon as a church plant from Kumbalam parish. St. Joseph's Church, blessed on 10 June 1973, is the parish church. There are two chapels in Padappakara, St. Sebastian Chapel in NS Nagar, and St. Jude Chapel in Kuthiramunabhu.

== Clubs ==
A number of youth clubs are located in Padappakara including Century Padappakkara, Costarica Padappakara, Sincere Padappakara, Yuvashakti Challengers Kuthiramunambu and Sariga N.S. Nagar.
