= Ashtamudi Lake =

Lake in Kerala, India

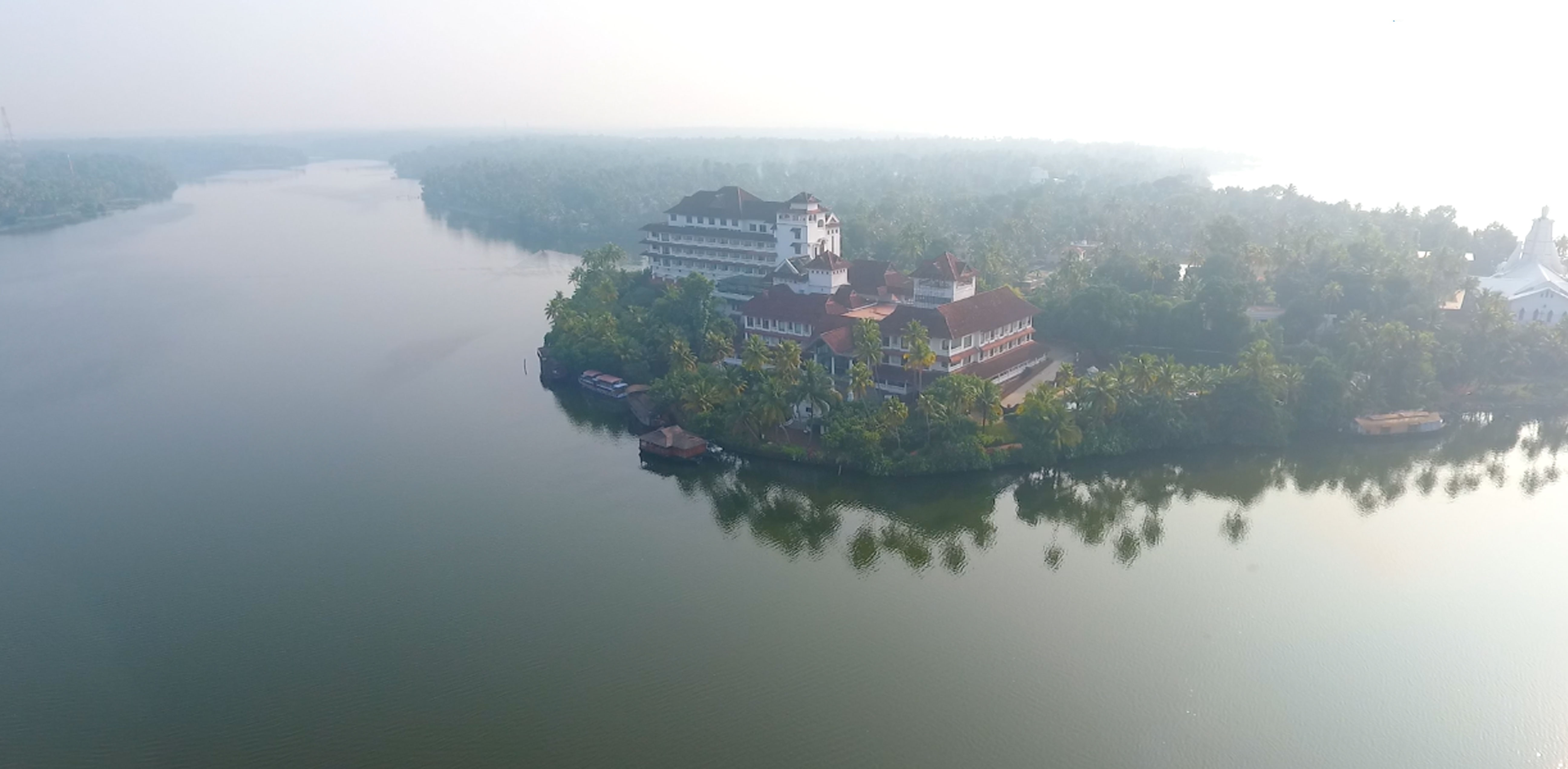
- An aerial view of the Ashtamudi lake

- Location within Kerala
- Location: Kollam District, Kerala
- Coordinates: 8°58′N 76°35′E
- Primary inflows: Kallada River
- Catchment area: 1,700 km^{2} (660 sq mi)
- Basin countries: India
- Surface area: 61.4 km^{2} (23.7 sq mi)
- Max. depth: 6.4 m (21 ft)
- Water volume: 76,000,000,000 km^{3} (1.8×10^{10} cu mi)
- Surface elevation: 10 m (33 ft)
- Islands: Sambranikodi Island; Munroe Island; Chavara Thekkumbhagom
- Settlements: Kollam (Metropolitan Area); Kundara (Census Town), Chavara (Census Town)

Ramsar Wetland
- Designated: 19 August 2002

Ashtamudi Lake (Ashtamudi Kayal, ml: "അഷ്ടമുടിക്കായൽ" ), in the Kollam District of the Indian state of Kerala is a unique wetland ecosystem and a large palm-shaped (also described as octopus-shaped) water body. It is second only in size to the Vembanad estuary ecosystem of the state. Ashtamudi means 'eight hills or peaks' (Ashta : 'eight'; mudi : 'peaks') in the local Malayalam language. The name is indicative of the lake's topography with its multiple branches. The lake is also called the gateway to the backwaters of Kerala and is well known for its houseboat and backwater resorts. Ashtamudi Wetland was included in the list of wetlands of international importance, as defined by the Ramsar Convention for the conservation and sustainable utilization of wetlands. Ashtamudi Estuary is the deepest among all the estuaries in Kerala, with a maximum depth of 6.4 meters at the confluence zone.

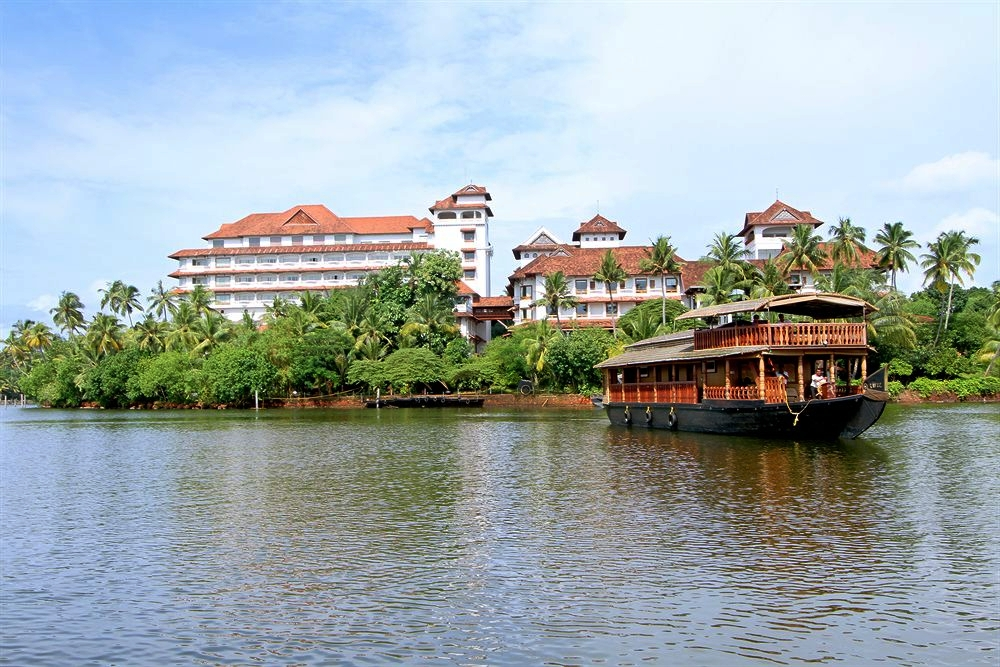
Luxury house boat in the backwaters

Along both banks of the lake and its backwater canals, coconut groves and palm trees interspersed with towns and villages are seen. Kollam, (formerly Quilon) is an important historic port city located on the right bank of the lake. Boat cruises are operated by the Kollam Boat Club from Kollam to Alappuzha providing transport access to many other towns and villages along this route. Chinese fishing nets, called cheena vala in Malayalam, are used by local fishermen and are a common sight along the waterway.

The lake and the city of Kollam on its banks and the Neendakara port at the confluence offer a means of transport for the state's trade and commerce in the cashew trading and processing industry as well as the marine products industry.

The lake is the source of livelihood of many people living close by. Fishing, coconut husk retting for coir production and inland navigation services are the prominent businesses.

The lake and the life on its shores have inspired many artists and writers. It has been the subject of many poems by the renowned poet Thirunalloor Karunakaran who was born and brought up on its banks.

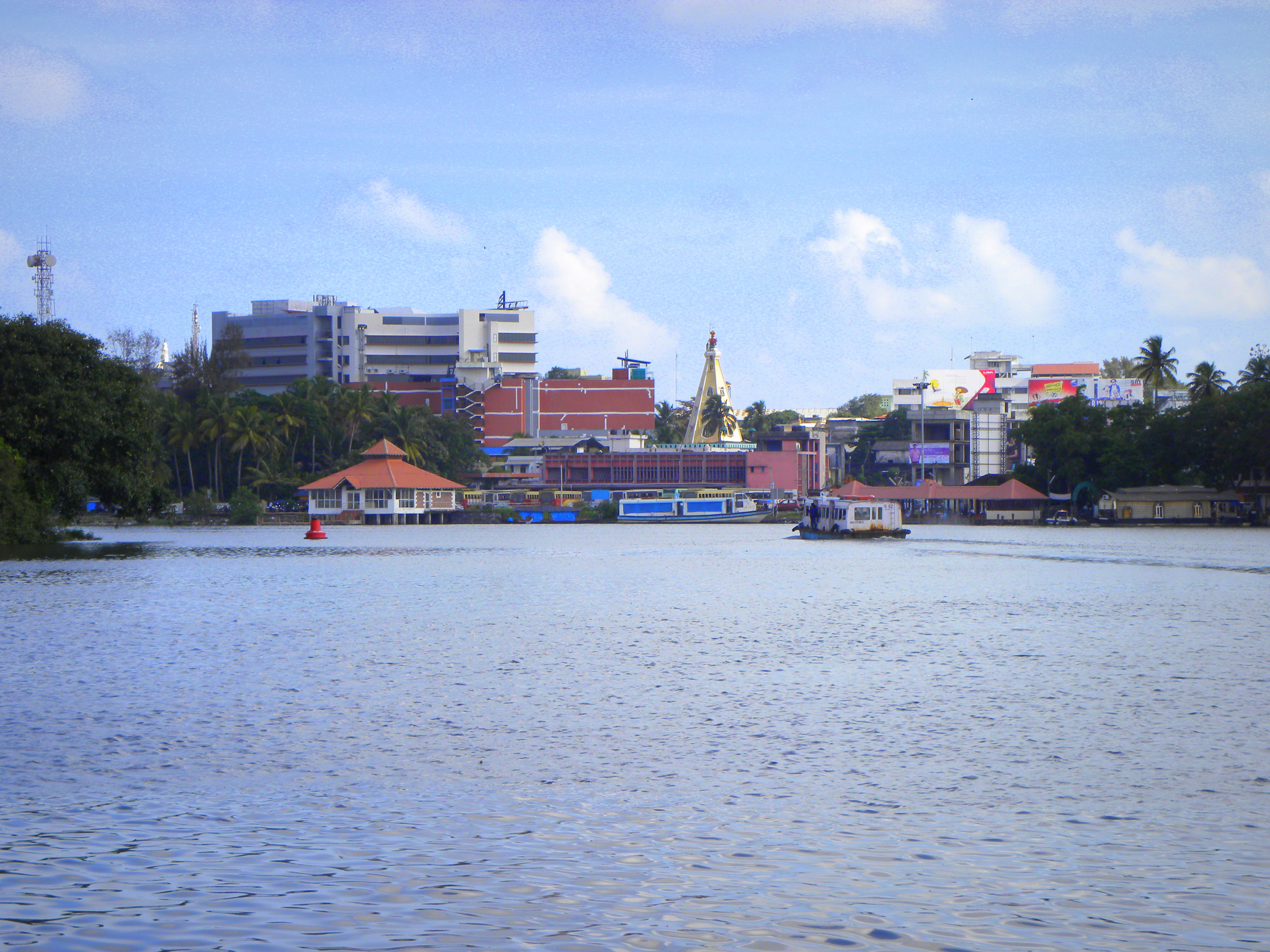
View of Ashtamudi Lake and Downtown Kollam

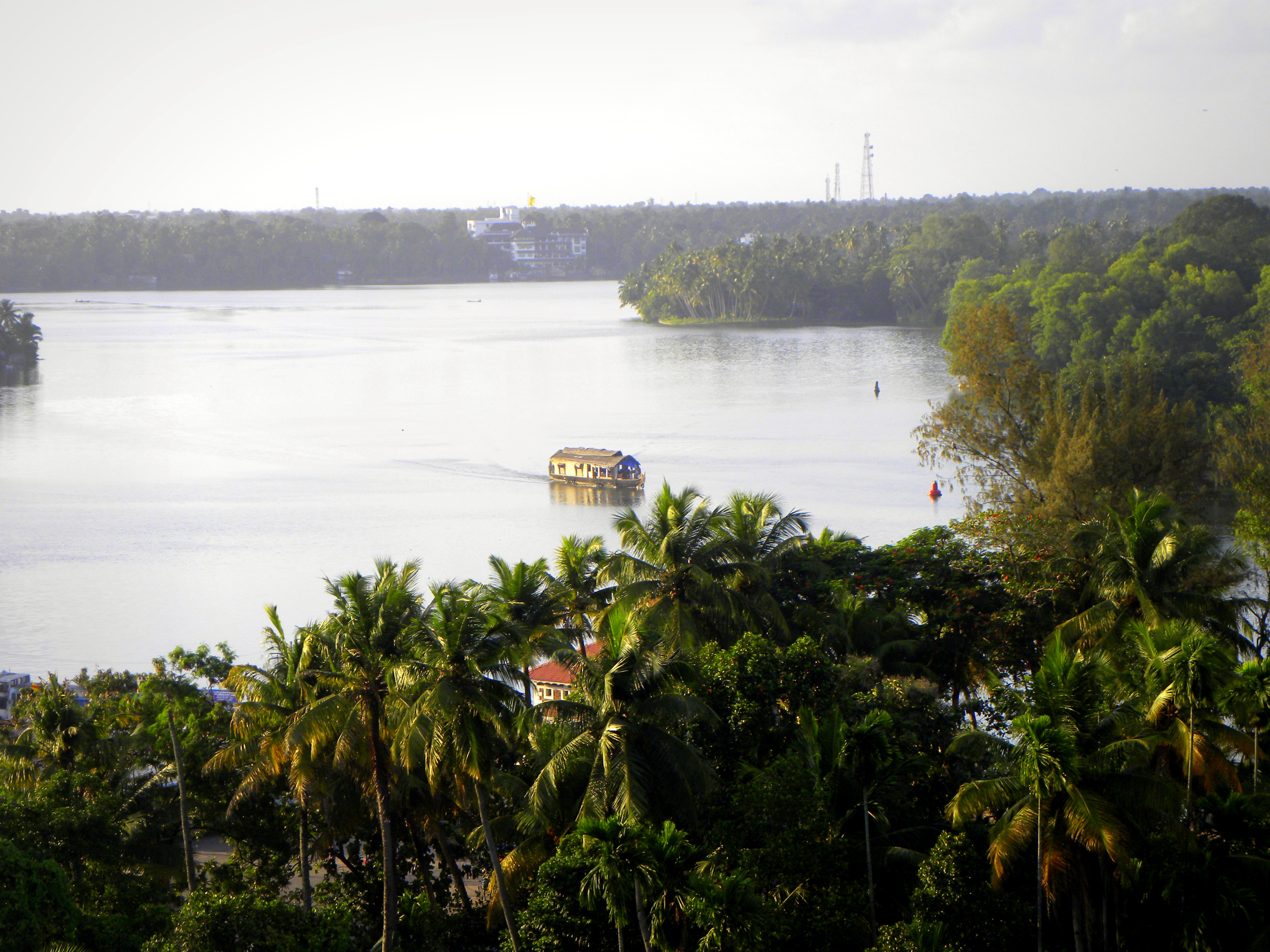
A top view of Ashtamudi backwaters

== Eight arms of Ashtamudi estuary ==
=== Kandachira Kayal ===
Kandachira Kayal serves as the southern arm of Ashtamudi Lake, connecting three panchayats: Panayam, Thrikadavoor, and Mangadu. According to data from the Panayam Village Office, the catchment area of Kandachira Kayal is approximately 20 hectares and 10 ares. The Kayal area extends to Kandachira, Panayam, Kadavoor, Thrikadavoor, Anchalumood, Thevalli, Ashramam, and reaches the southern side of the KSRTC bus stand in Kollam. A significant quantity of municipal waste finds its way into the lake through the canal that traverses the southern and eastern regions of Kollam Town.

Uliyakovil Kadavu, IInd Milestone, Kavanadu Kadavu, Mangadu Kadavu, Mangadu, Mangadu North, West of Kandachira Church, Kandachira, Road Kadavu Kandachira, Kaippana Kayalvaram, Vettuvila, Muttathumoola Kadavu, Kottilukada, Kuthirakkada, Venkekkara, KadavoorMurunthal, chirayil

=== Kureepuzha Kayal ===
Kureepuzha Kayal of Ashtamudi Estuary is often likened to the "Loch Lomond" of Kerala due to its resemblance to Loch Lomond in Britain. It is the busiest kayal in the Ashtamudi estuarine system as it is part of the National Waterway and serves as the only route to Kollam town from Neendakara. The Kollam Corporation waste dumping yard is situated on the left bank of Kureepuzha Kayal (Mammoottilkadavu).

Kottayathukadavu, Kochukottayathukadavu, Pandonni Kadavu, Kadavoor West, Mukkadayil, Thonippurakkal, Chamavila, Panamukkam, Thevadanathu Kayalvaram, Kureepuzha, Mamoottilkadavu Kureepuzha, Pathinettampadi Kadavu, Ayiravalli Temple, Aravila Kadavu, Malayante Kayalvaram, AiKadavu, Mundante Kadavu, Kuppana Erakkukadavu, Poovanthazham Temple, Chandakadavu, Vanvila, Oalikara, Thekkechirayil, Kanjaveli, Pochayil Kayalvaram, Challikkuzhi Kayalvaram, Gosthalakavu Kayalvaram, Kollante Kayalvaram, Panavila, Mukkekadavu, Pallikkadavu, Prakkulam, Sambranikodi, Neendakara, Sakthikulangara, Kallumpurathukadavu, Kaikkara Kadavu, Kallayyathu Kadavu, Kinattummoottil Kadavu, Mukkad Kadavu, Mukkad Pallikadavu, Kaniyan Kadavu, Aravila, Kavanad, Mamoottilkadavu North, Mamoottilkadavu, Kureepuzha, Kollam, Erattakadavu, Manalilkadavu, Kollam, Kaithavaram, Thoppilkadavu, Njanakshethram

==== Thevally Kayal ====
Kollam KSRTC Bus stand, Kollam Boatjetty, Kollam Asramam Link Road, Kollam Yathri Nivas / Tamirind, Advenger Park, Asramam West, Asramam North, Uliyajkovil, Uliyajkovil Thuruth, Thevally Fort, Thevally, Olayilkadavu, Postmortom Kadavu

=== Kadapuzha Kayal (Kallada) ===
Kalladaparapu, Muttom, Thenguvila, Shingarapalli, Edachal, Pattakadavu, Manchadikadavu, Areekadavu, Mannukadavu, Arinalloor kadavu, Erunilakayal, Arinalloor pallikadavu, Cheri kadavu, KoyivilaPallikadavu, Koyivila Jetti, Kodikadavu, Mamottilkadavu, Kalladaparampu

=== Kanjirottu Kayal ===
Vellimon, Padappakara, Kanjaveettil Kayalvaram, Vadhyarukadavu, Pookvarical, Thottarodimunambhu, Kattilpoika, Kuthiramunambhu, Kanjirottukadavu, Manchadimoola, Kaithakodi, Vellimon Kadavu

=== Kumbalathu Kayal ===
Muttum Kadavu, Kadathukadavu, Valathil Mannukadavu, Kumbalam, Valiya Kumbalam, Padinjareathazhaveettil Kayalvaram, Oonambalam, Oonambalam West, Peringera Valavu, Kuzhikara, Nellimukkam

=== Perumon Kayal ===
Ashtamudi Kadavu, Thottathil Kayalvaram, Sanga Kadavu, Kannadimukku, Veerabadra Temple East, Karinjapalli, Chekkalayil Puthuvel, Mangalathu East, Koolpadam, Ottaffice Kayalvaram, Mundakkal Pallikadavu, Mundakal, Perumon, Perumon Devi Temple, Vadakkepura Kadavu, Koothala puthuval, Mulluvila Kadavu, Vellimon Kadavu, Nadeelaveettil puthuval, Kodiyil Kayalvaram, Chamakkadu, Road Kadavu, Chamakadavu, Thottumugamkadavu, Karuli Kadavu, Mampuzha Kadavu, Kuzhiyam, Pulikuzhi, Edakkara, Edakkara, Njaravila, Manchadimula Kadavu, Kaithakodi, Vellimon Resort Palace, Elavakuzhi, Karapoika Kadavu, Road Kadavu, Perumon Kadavu, Perumon Lake, Chemmakkadu Palli Kadavu

=== Thekkumbhagum Kayal ===
Pamba, Nadutheri, Dalavapuram, Pulimoottil kadav, Thekkumbhagam, Pallikadavu, Thekkumbhagam, Pallapil, Maalil kadavu, Prakkulam, Prakkulam Jetty, Manalil kadavu, Malayarikkal, Malayarikkal kadavu, Ashtamudi, AshtamudiVeerabadraTemple, Mootharea Kayalvaram, Paumba bridge East, Pauba Jetty, Chavudi kayalvaram, Tholukadavu, Malibhagam, Thundivila kadavu, Njaramoodu, Ammavankodi, Koppanveettil Puthuval, Thekkum bhagam, Thuduvila kadavu, Panakottil shertraputhuval, Kandalathuputhuval, Ponnayathuputhuval, Guhanadhapuram, Kacheri Kadavu, Kadanmoola, Panamottilkadavu, Azhakathukadavu, Kulangaraveli, Valathil, Nadakavupalliputhuval, Munnapathu kadavu, Munnapathu North, Puttuvila, Pavamba west, Mukundapuram, Melampallikadavu, Pallikadavu, Karattil kadavu, Pannamoottil kadavu, Puthanthura, Delavapuram Old Bridge, Marryland panchayathukadavu, Neelaswaram Kadavu, Neendakara, Vadakumbhagam

== History ==
A recent study on the late Quaternary evolution of the Ashtamudi-Sasthamkotta lake systems revealed that during the early Holocene period, Ashtamudi Lake had 12 creeks (Dhwadesamudi). Sasthamkotta Lake, Kerala's largest natural freshwater lake, which is now listed as a Ramsar site, was believed to have been part of Ashtamudi Lake approximately 10,000 years ago but became disconnected around 7,000 years ago. Currently, Sasthamkotta Lake has eight creeks (Ashtamudi). Two other creeks of the lake were disconnected during a similar process in the early Holocene period, namely Chittumala Lake and Cherupola Lake. During the disconnection period, the creek that later formed Sasthamcotta Lake had the upper estuary salinity of the then Ashtamudi Lake. It is estimated that it took at least 1,000 years for the disconnected water body to completely lose its salinity.

Quilon or Kollam and inevitably Ashtamudi lake's importance is claimed to be dated to the days of the Romans and the Phoenicians. Ibn Batuta, during his 24-year sojourn in the 14th century, is reported to have mentioned about the Quilon port as one of the five ports for Chinese trade. Links with Persia (9th century), Chinese mandarin in 1275 AD, Portuguese in 1502 AD, and the Dutch followed British in 1795 AD are recorded history. Velu Thampi is credited with organizing the rebellion against the British from this place. During the colonial era, the Dutch Naval Commander General D’ Lanoy is believed to have ordered the reclamation of part of Ashtamudi marshes on the southern flanks, particularly in Dalawapuram, for the plantation of coconut and other fruit trees. Subsequently, in the nineteenth century, the British expanded the expanse of Quilon by establishing an army garrison and extending markets in the area. Railway links were established with Thirunelveli in 1904 and with Trivandrum in 1918, as documented by Menon (1964). Furthermore, the establishment of roads and a railway link between Kollam and Ernakulam via Munroe Island in 1958 eventually led to the fragmentation of the Ashtamudi estuary into two parts, particularly isolating the Karali marshes.

== Access ==
Considering Kollam as the entry city to the lake, access to the lake are to the Thiruvananthapuram International Airport, 71 km (44 mi) away and by road to almost all important centres in Kerala and the rest of the country. National Highway 47 (NH 47) passes through the lake periphery not only from Quilon but also to other locations on its bank from Thiruvananthapuram to the northern towns of Kerala. Southern Railways network of lines connects Quilon with all important centres in the rest of the country. Ferry services operate daily to Alleppey and boats operate to all villages located in the canals of the backwater system. The boat jetty is located at about 2 km (1.2 mi) away from the railway station. Famous Paravur estuary and backwaters are just 21 kilometer away from Ashtamudi. National waterway 3 (Kollam - Kottappuram) starts from the south of Ashtamudi lake over a distance of 168 km. Among the seven terminals positioned along this waterway, Ashtamudi and Kollam are situated along the estuary. Regular boat services to Muthiraparamb, Guhanandapuram, Ayiramthengu, Munroe Island, and Alappuzha are available from the Kollam jetty.

== Topography ==
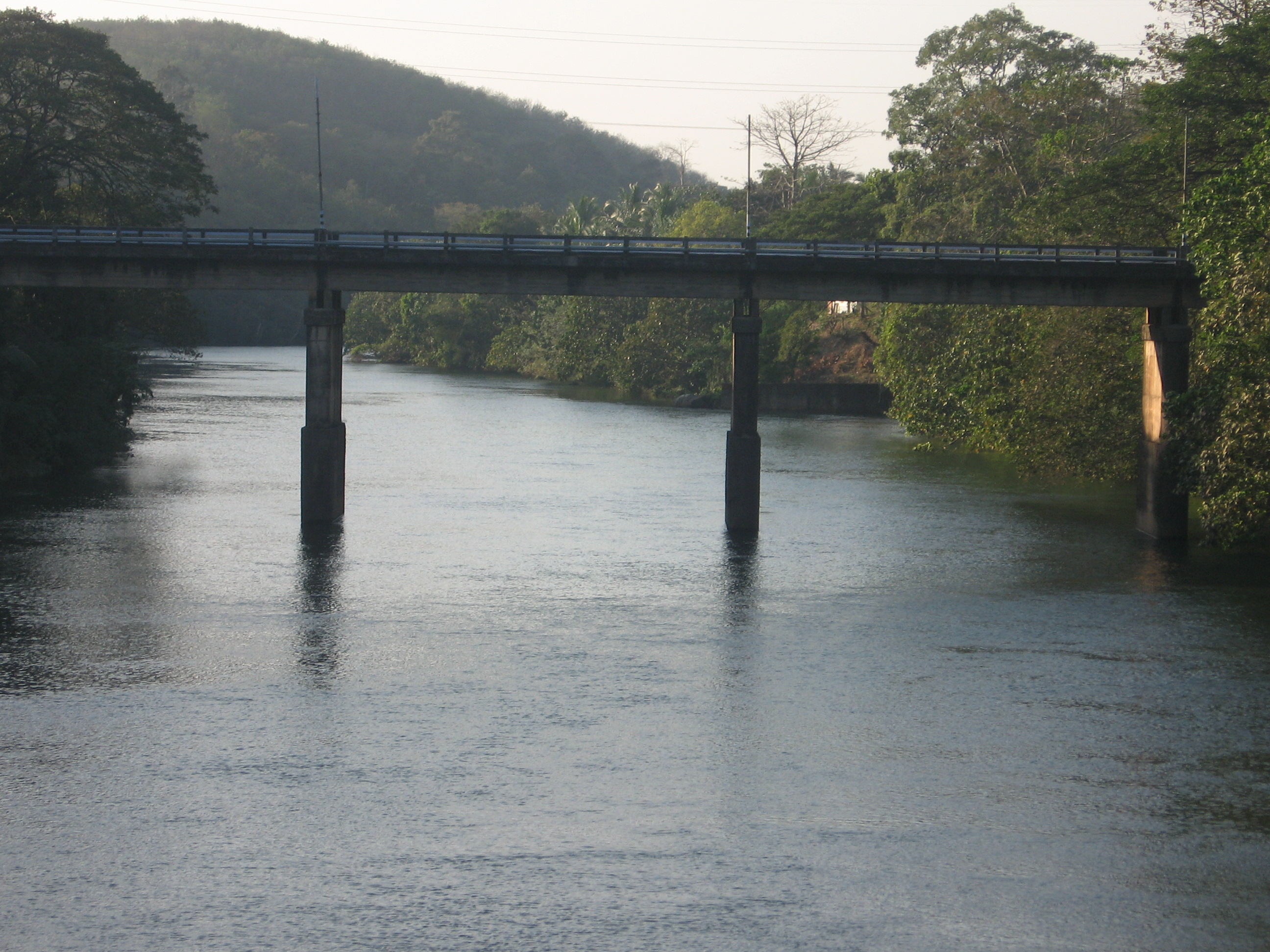
Kallada River

Kallada River is a major river discharging into the Ashtamudi Lake. The Kallada river, which originates near Ponmudi from the Kulathupuzha hills Western Ghats is formed by the confluence of three rivers, viz., Kulathupuzha, Chenthurnipuzha, and Kalthuruthipuzha, and after traversing a distance of about 121 km (75 mi) through virgin forests finally debouches into the Ashtamudi wetland at Peringalam (Koivilai) located to the west of Munroe Island. The Kallada River has a length of 121 km and a catchment area of 1,699 km^{2}. The annual run-off is estimated at 2,140.8 million meter^{3}. The river's tributaries originate independently in the highlands at an altitude of 1,200 meters and converge at about 300 meters to form the Kallada River. The river reaches the coast at an altitude of 0–10 meters before emptying into Ashtamudi Lake. From the east, the estuary comprises eight arms: Thevally, Kureepuzha, Kandachira, Thekkumbhagam, Peruman, Kanjirottu, Kallada, and Kumbaluthu, giving it the name "Ashtamudi" which means "eight-coned." The estuary also encompasses four major islands: Munroturuttu, Thekkumbhagam, Trikkaruva, and Trikakkadavur. With a maximum depth of 21 ft (6.4 m) at the confluence, it is Kerala's deepest estuary. Ashtamudi Estuary exhibits a shallow characteristic, with an average depth of 1.8 meters and a maximum depth of 9 meters. The central area of the estuary typically ranges in depth from 1 to 2 meters, featuring a deep, funnel-shaped depression along its eastern margins.

Ashtamudi Lake receives water from numerous minor streams draining from the south and east. It is connected to Paravur Kayal (Kollam Thodu) in the south and to Kayamkulam Kayal (Chavara - Panmana Thodu) in the north via canals. Other streams like manichithodu drains into the lake. The presence of several islands (known as thruths) indicates a high rate of siltation in the estuary.

=== Neendakara ===
The mouth of the Ashtamudi Estuary has been developed into Neendakara Harbour, which serves over 3,000 marine fishing boats and trawlers. The harbour features breakwaters extending 610 meters seaward and 380 meters leeward, creating a sheltered basin and a navigable approach for the vessels.

Littoral drift, which involves the movement of sediments in near-shore zones by waves and currents, significantly influences the shaping and orientation of coastal landforms and the overall evolution of the coast. The Neendakara inlet serves as a confluence zone between the sea and the estuary. The tidal amplitude at this location reaches a maximum of 1.12 meters, with an average of 0.5 meters according to tide-forecast.com.

In natural conditions, high drift rates are likely to lead to the formation of shoals and bars at the mouth of the estuary, which may be periodically cut open by high-velocity river flows. With the reduction in inflows from the Kallada River, the mouth of the estuary requires periodic dredging to maintain sufficient depth for port operations.

=== Islands in the lake ===
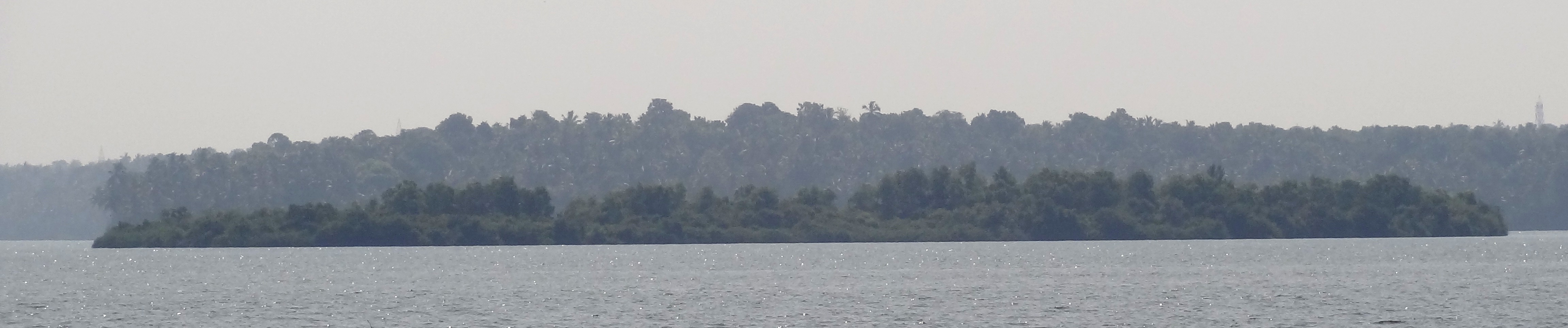
An uninhabited island in Munroe Island cluster, situated at Lake Ashtamudi

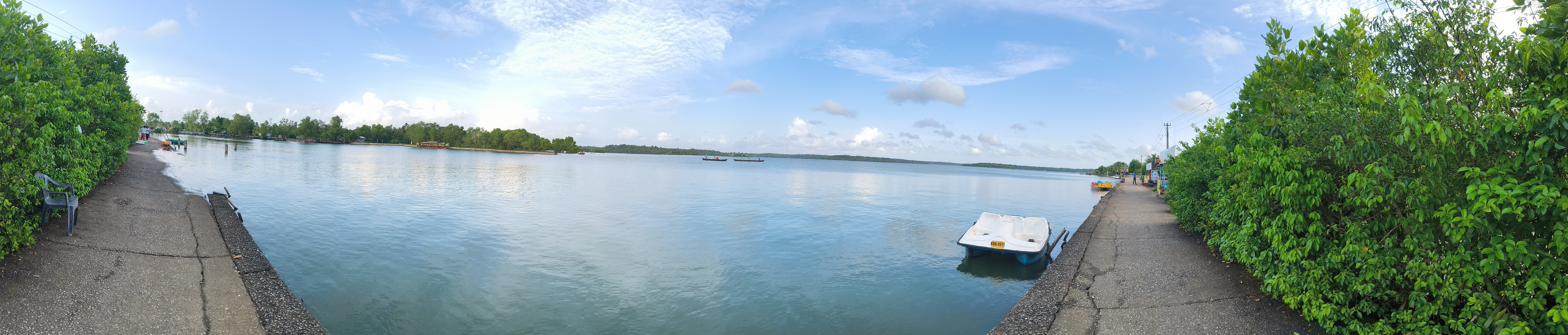
Panoramic view of Mundro Island

Munroe Island (Munroethuruth) is a cluster of eight tiny islands in Ashtamudi Lake.

Thekkumbhagom island, situated on the bank of the Ashtamudi Lake, provides the feel of rustic life of a village. The significance of this village is because the first epic poetry in the Malayalam language, Ramachandravilasam, was composed by the poet Azhakath Padmanabha Kurup in this village. An ancient 1000-year-old temple and a 200-year-old church are located here.

List of major islands in Ashtamudi:

Bishop Thuruthu	Kochu Thuruthu	Palliyam Thuruthu
Cheekan Thuruthu	Koyivila Thuruthu	Pannakka Thuruthu
IInd Thuruthu	Mantro Thuruthu	Pathumma Thuruthu
Kallumpuram Puthen Thuruth	Neelaswaram Thuruthu	Peringalam
Neettum Thuruthu	Pezhumthuruthu	Poothuruthu
Padappakkara	Pattamthuruthu	Puthen Thuruthu
St. Joseph Island	St. Sabastian Thuruthu	Velu Thuruthu
Sambranikodi Island		

=== Bridges in the lake ===
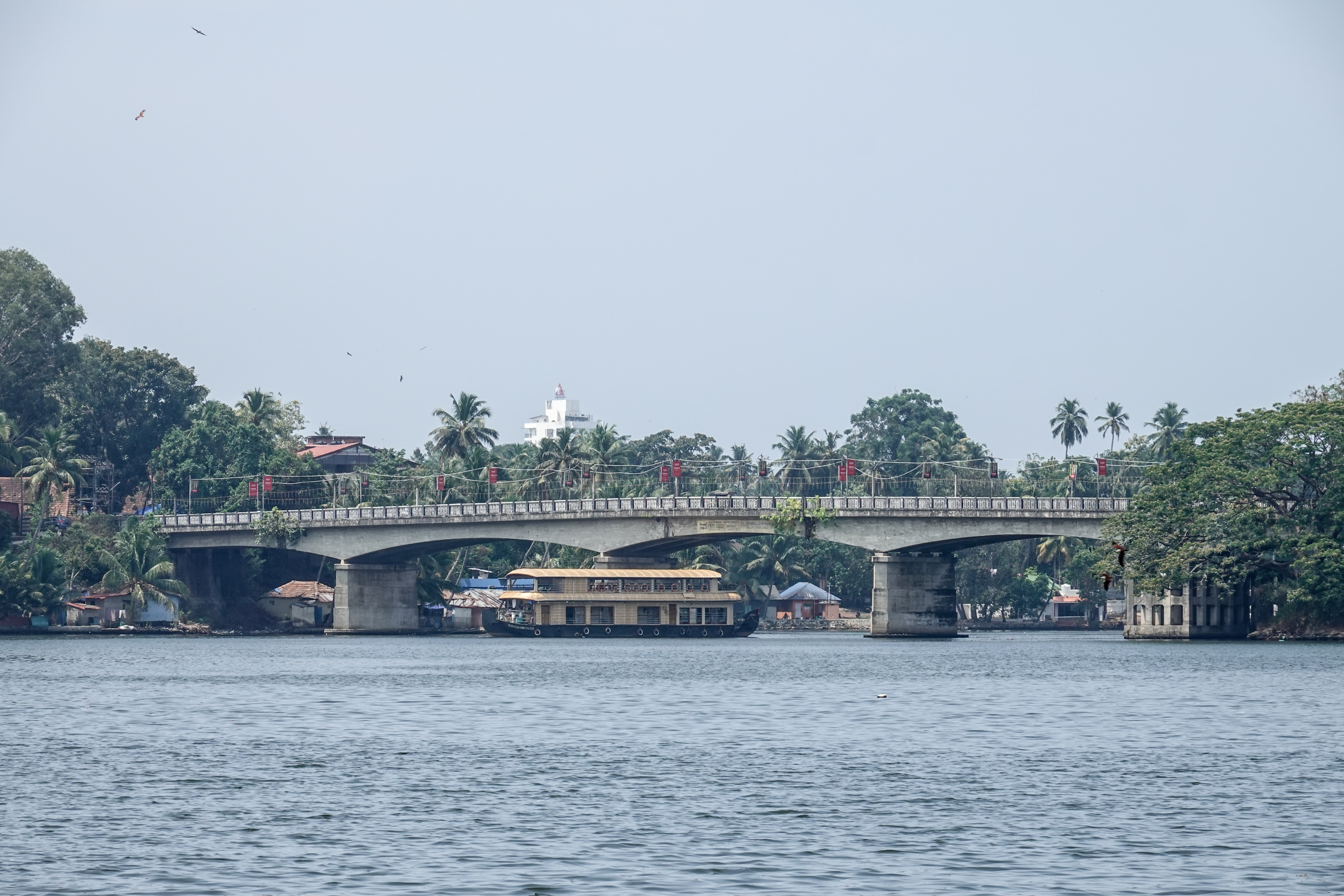
Houseboat passes under Thevally Bridge

Below are the major bridges in the lake

Bridges	Connects
Thevally Bridge	Thevally - Mathilil (NH 183)
Perumon Bridge	Perumon - Pezhumthuruthu (Kollam - Kayamkulam railway)
Delavapuram Bridge	Thekkumbhagom - Dalawapuram
Neendakara Bridge	Neendakara - Sakthikulangara (NH 66)
Edachal Bridge	Pezhunthuruthu - Pattomthuruthu
Puthenthuruthu Bridge	
Kavanad Bridge	Sakthikulngara - Kureeppuzha (NH 66)
Mangad Bridge	Mangadu - Kadavoor (NH 66)

== Geology ==
Quaternary and Tertiary sediments and sedimentary rocks are the formations in the lake basin and environs. The Quaternary sediments are of marine and fluvial alluvium of recent age. Tertiary sediments comprise laterite, sandstones and clays of Warkalai formation.

The tertiary Warkalli Formation and Quilon Formation are prominently exposed around the Ashtamudi Estuary. The Warkalli Formation consists of sandstone and clay with lignite intercalations, which overlay fossiliferous limestone and calcareous clay of the Quilon Formation. The latter formation is extensively exploited, contributing significantly to the region's mineral output. Kollam District is responsible for producing 36% of the state's crude clay and 43.5% of its processed clay, which collectively account for 9.08% of India's total China Clay production. The coastal side of the basin exposes the Guruvayur Formation from the quaternary period, characterized by a sand-silt-clay admixture of marine origin.

== Hydrology ==
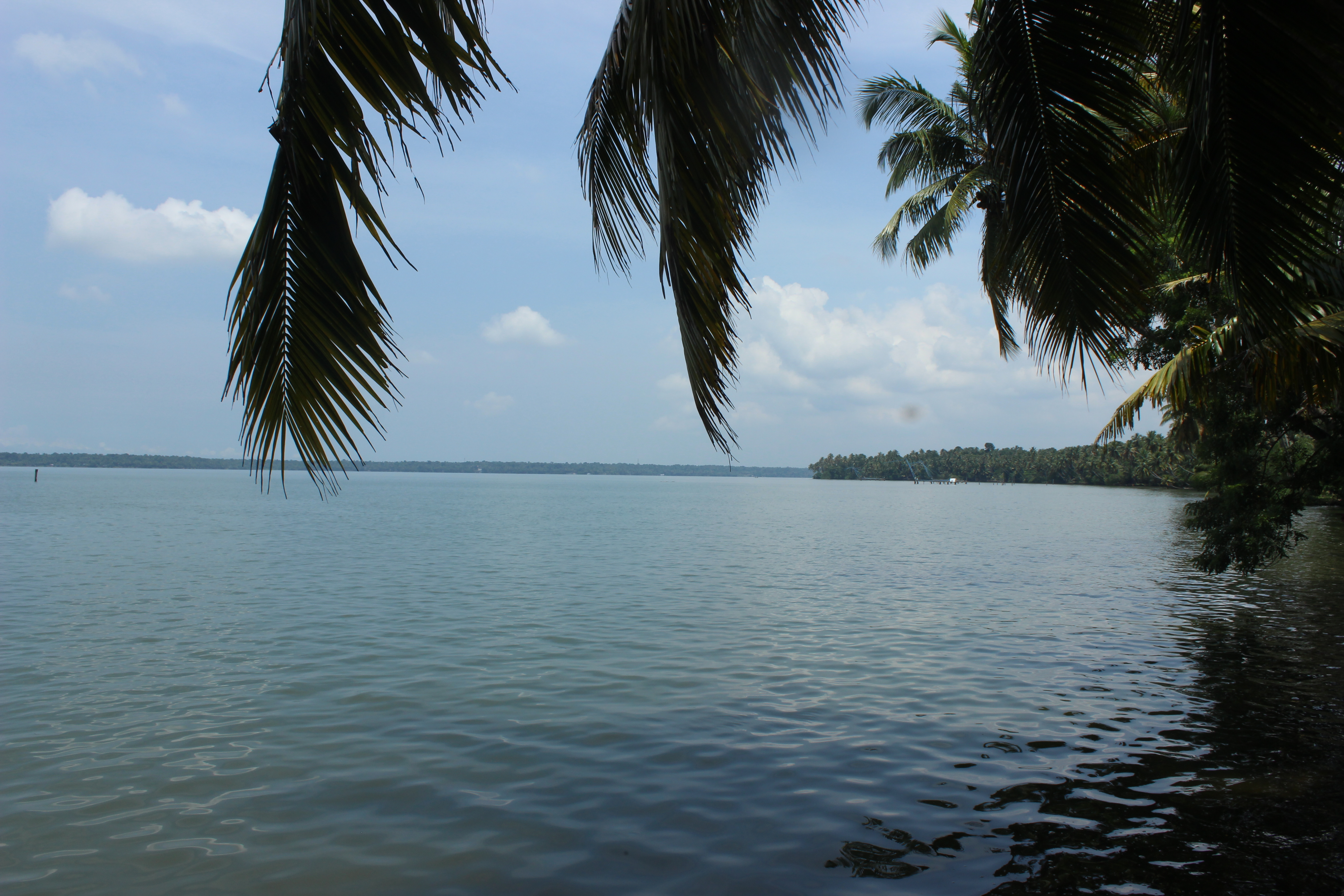
Astamudi Lake Near Veerabhadra Swami Temple

Ashtamudi Estuary remains an open system year-round, characterized by the absence of sandbar formations regardless of the season. Consequently, tidal action persists strongly throughout the year, extending even to the interior parts of the estuary. There is a net tidal exchange of 4968 m^{3}. The average annual runoff from the river system into the estuary is reported to be 76 km^{3} of freshwater. The basin drainage area is 1,700 km^{2} (660 mi^{2}) and with an average annual rainfall of 2400 mm (94 in) it discharges 3.375 km^{3} (2,740,000 ac·ft) of flow annually. It acts as a flood storage lake thus protecting the thickly populated city of Quilon (Kollam) and the coastal land. The Thenmala Dam built across the Kallada river is 85.3 m high by 35 m long (280 ft by 115 ft) with a reservoir area of 23 km^{2} (8.9 mi^{2}) with a storage volume of 0.505 km^{3} (409,000 ac·ft). Though it provides irrigation to 61630 ha for paddy and upland crops, it has aggravated the salinity ingress into the wetland and the river due to reduced outflows during summer months. 88% of the inflow contributed by Kallada and 12% through rainfall. During peak monsoon, the inundation of the Ashtamudi Estuary reaches 5,700 hectares, with a maximum length of 10.6 km and a width of 8 km. This seasonal transition is a significant aspect of the wetland's ecological character, particularly influencing its ecological productivity.

Ashtamudi is a brackish system, so the salinity values are high. It ranges between 13 and 33.5 ppt. The creek areas are normally remain fresh during the monsoon and post monsoon.

The commissioning of the Kallada Dam has resulted in a significant reduction in freshwater inflow into the estuary. This, coupled with decreasing rainfall and rising sea levels, has led to an increase in salinity levels. However, the decline in water quality within the estuary has been notable due to the continuous discharge of untreated waste from various sources, including Kollam City, tourist resorts, industrial units, slaughterhouses, and houseboats.

== Climate ==
The estuary and its drainage basin are situated in a warm, humid tropical climate. The average annual rainfall amounts to 2251.57 mm, primarily received in two distinct spells of the south-west and north-east monsoons. Rainfall during the south-west monsoon constitutes the predominant component, contributing 48% of the total rainfall. Temperature typically ranges between 22 and 33 °C. Evaporation rates peak during January (207 mm) and reach a minimum in July (89 mm). Relative humidity varies from 63% in January to 87% in June–July. Wind speeds range from 1.3 to 2.1 km/hour, with higher speeds observed during March–June and lower speeds during September–December.

== Flora ==
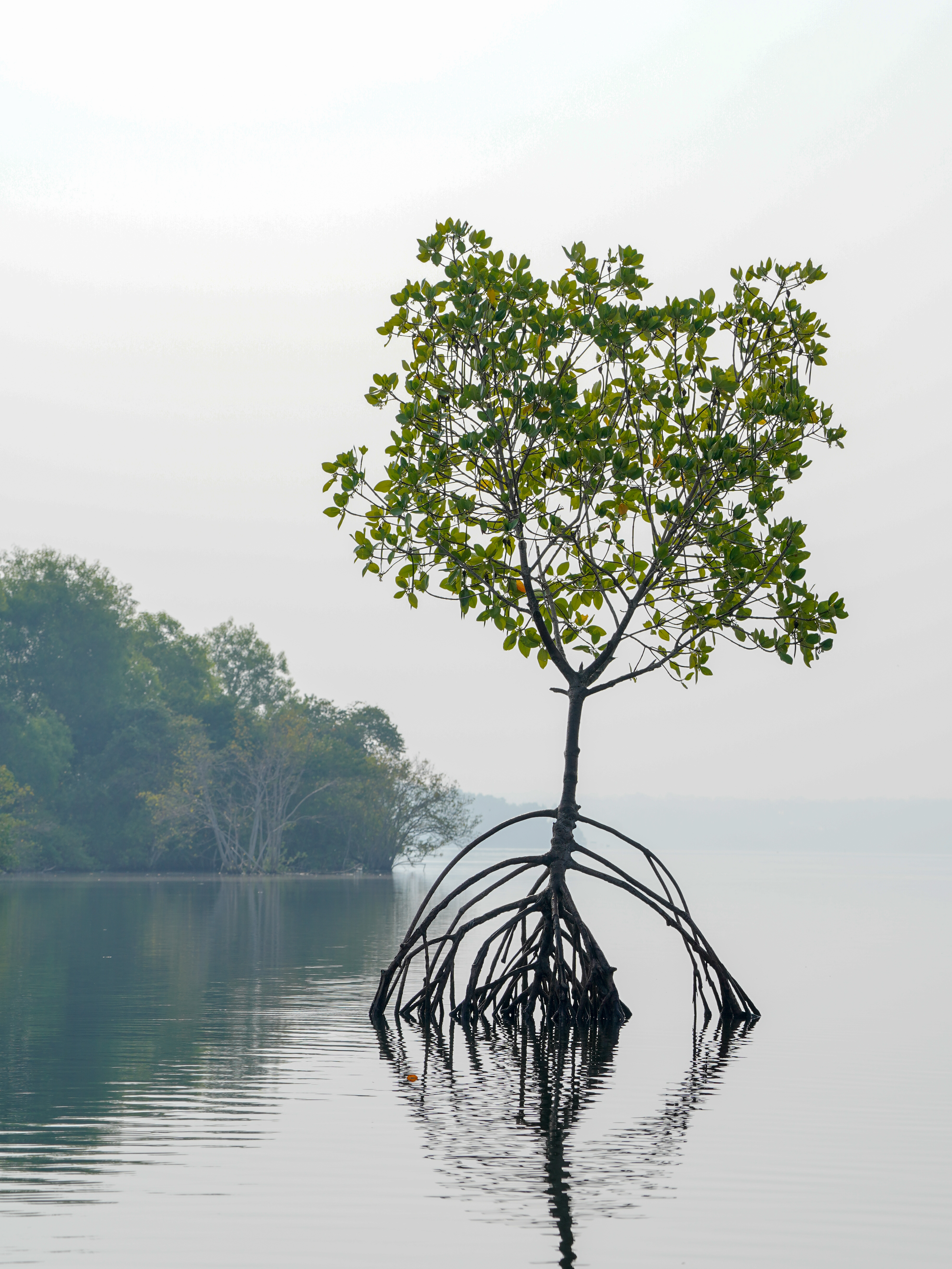
Lone mangrove in Ashtamudi Lake

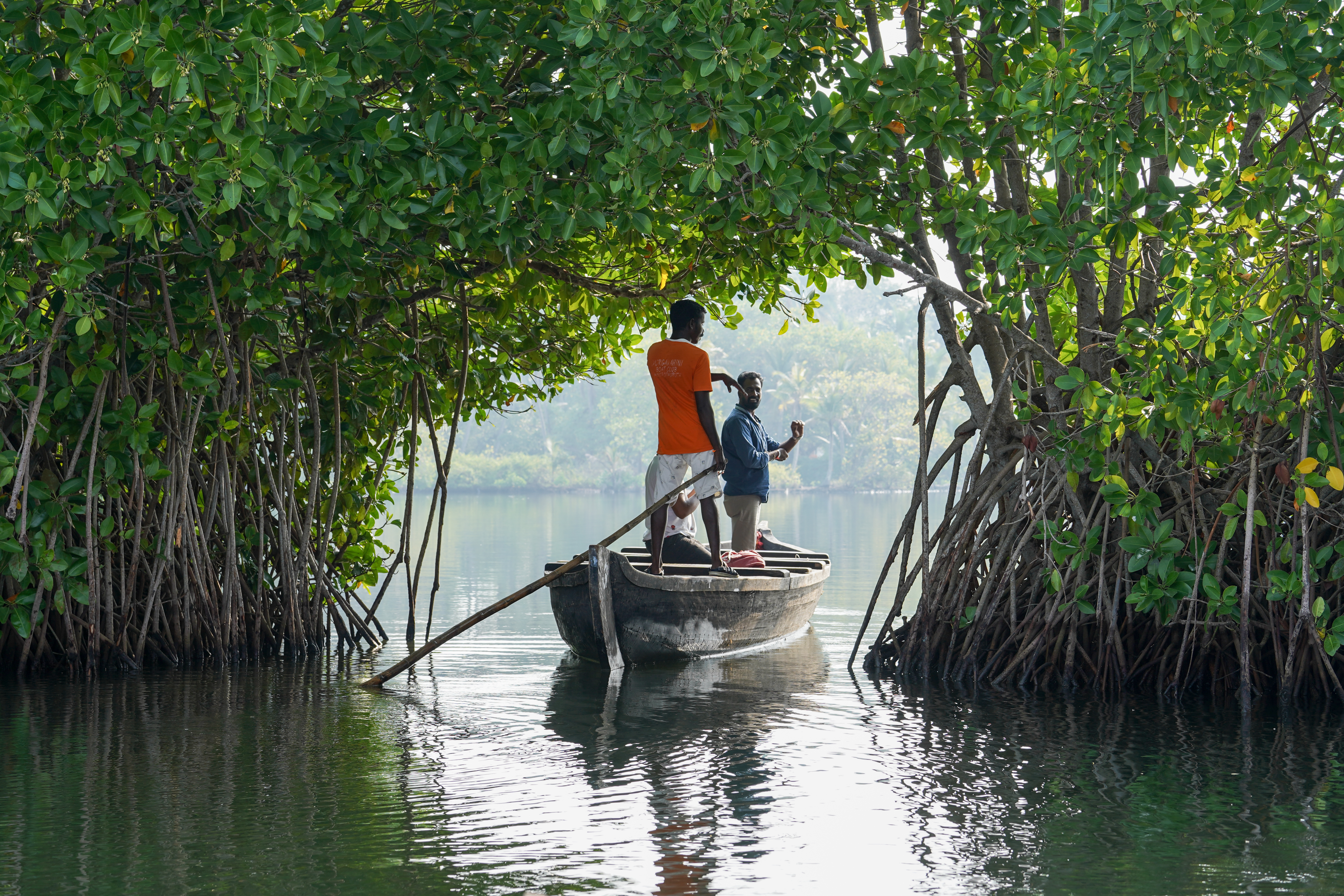
Boat passes under arch of mangrove trees

Ashtamudi Estuary has mangroves Avicennia officinalis, Brugiera gymnorrhiza and Sonneratia caseolaris as also 43 species of marshy and mangrove associates including two endangered species Syzygium travancoricum (endangered species according to the Red Data Book of Indian Plants) and Calamus rotang in the Terrestrial system. These species offer excellent scope for development of marine bioreserve to promote eco-tourism in the estuarine of the lake. IUCN lists the two endangered species in IUCN 2008. The total number of Syzygium travancoricum is reported to be very small, not more than 200. The major threats to the endangered species are reportedly draining of the wet lands and conversion into paddy fields. A total of 52 species of phytoplankton have been documented in the estuary, representing 35 families and 10 classes.

The mangroves seen in Ashtamudi ecosystem are

True Mangrove Species

- Acanthus ilicifolius L. (Family: Acanthaceae)
- Avicennia marina (Forsk.) Vierh. (Family: Avicenniaceae)
- Avicennia officinalis L. (Family: Avicenniaceae)
- Lumnitzera racemosa Willd. (Family: Combretaceae)
- Excoecaria agallocha L. (Family: Euphorbiaceae)
- Derris trifoliata Lour. (Family: Fabaceae)
- Sonneratia caseolaris (L.) Engl. (Family: Lythraceae)
- Acrostichum aureum L. (Family: Pteridaceae)
- Bruguiera gymnorhiza (L.) Lam. (Family: Rhizophoraceae)
- Ceriops tagal (Perr) CB.Rob. (Family: Rhizophoraceae)
- Rhizophora apiculata Blume (Family: Rhizophoraceae)

Associate Mangrove Species

- Alstonia scholaris (L.) R.Br. (Family: Apocynaceae)
- Cerbera odollam Gaertn. (Family: Apocynaceae)
- Calophyllum inophyllum L. (Family: Guttiferae)
- Hibiscus tiliaceus L. (Family: Malvaceae)
- Thespesia populnea (L.) Soland. ex Correa (Family: Malvaceae)
- Syzygium travancoricum Gamble (Family: Myrtaceae)
- Pandanus fascicularis Lam. (Family: Pandanaceae)

=== Ashramam Biodoversity Heritagesite ===
Ashramam Biodiversity Heritage Site is the first biodiversity heritage site in the Kerala state that came up at Asramam in the banks of Ashtamudi lake. This heritage site encompasses more than 50 hectares, including the Government Guest House complex, the mangrove area, and the creek of Ashtamudi Lake.

== Wildlife ==
The lake supports 57 species of avifauna, of which 6 are migratory and 51 resident species. It is also reported that about 40 species of wetland-dependent birds are recorded in the lake, out of which 45% are long-distance migrants. Terns, plovers, cormorants, and herons are most abundant birds in the lake. A study report has identified 45 insect species, including 26 species of butterfly, 5 odonates, 9 hymenopteras, and 2 orthopterans, 1 hemipteran and 2 coleopterans. About 29 zooplankton species have also been identified. The water body is the habitat for phytoplankton from the genera Amphora, Borosigma, Cyclotella, Cymbella, Gyrozigma, Meloziva, Navicula and Nitzschi. More than 20,000 waterfowl visit Ashtamudi Lake annually. Additionally, the lake serves as a nursery ground for commercially important shrimp species that are harvested off the Kollam coast. The zooplankton fauna in Ashtamudi Lake primarily comprises Copepoda, fish larvae, Oligochaeta, fish eggs, Ostracoda, Polychaeta, Coelenterata, and Rotifer.

=== Fishes ===
The composition of the fish fauna in Ashtamudi Lake comprises a total of 87 species under 64 genera, belonging to 38 families within 14 orders. Among the recorded species, 8 are classified as highly commercial, 45 as commercial, 27 as minor commercial, and 7 have no fisheries interest.

The taxonomic distribution of fish species in Ashtamudi Lake reveals the following order composition:

- Perciformes: 46 species
- Clupeiformes: 12 species
- Mugiliformes: 6 species
- Cypriniformes: 4 species
- Siluriformes: 4 species
- Pleuronectiformes: 3 species
- Tetraodontiformes: 3 species
- Beloniformes: 3 species
- Scorpaeniformes: 1 species
- Elopiformes: 1 species
- Atheriniformes: 1 species
- Cyprinidontiformes: 1 species
- Gonorynchiformes: 1 species
- Anguilliformes: 1 species

In terms of percentage distribution, Perciformes is the most dominant order, constituting 52.87% of the total fish species, followed by Clupeiformes (13.79%), Mugiliformes (6.89%), Cypriniformes and Siluriformes (4.59% each), Pleuronectiformes, Beloniformes, and Tetradontiformes (3.45% each), and the remaining orders each constituting 1.15% of the total fish species.

World Wildlife Fund (WWF) reports

97 species of fish (42 are typically marine, 3 estuarine, 9 estuarine-riverine, 15 marine-estuarine) and unique copepod species. It is also a congenial habitat for all species of penaeid and palaemonid Prawns, edible crabs, paphia malabarica (short neck Clams) and a variety of fish. A comparative shell morphology study of short-neck clam Paphia malabarica, the main clam fishery resources in the Ashtamudi Lake re-assigned to the genus Marcia recens (Venus Clams) and this study found it was wrongly identified as short-neck clam in previous studies. Clams found in the estuary are exported. The estuary is the source of livelihood for thousands of fishermen and is stated to be the second biggest fish-landing centre after the Vembanad estuary.

== Households in and around Ashtamudi lake ==
S.No	Settlement	Name	Household	Population
1	Rural	Thevalakkara	10473	42977
2	Rural	Thekkumbhagom	4388	16937
3	Urban	Neendakara	4087	16976
4	Rural	Mundrothuruth	2407	9054
5	Rural	Kizhakkekallada	5603	21820
6	Rural	Mulavana	9289	35887
7	Urban	Thrikkaruva	6307	25432
8	Urban	Panayam	6415	25607
9	Urban	Perinad	8719	35173
10	Urban	Thrikkadavoor	9845	39285
11	Rural	Chavara	1689	6857
12	Rural	West Kallada	310	1167
Total			69532	277172

== Economic evaluation of the lake's resources ==
An evaluation of the marketed use benefits of Ashtamudi estuary (valued using market valuation approach) has assessed the total direct use value at Rs.66.8 million per annum; coconut husk retting accounts for Rs.5.1 million, Inland navigation service accounts for Rs.3.7 million and the recreation benefit is assessed at Rs.1.5 million (using the standard travel cost method). But this is reported to be showing a downward trend, particularly in fish resources in the estuary. This evaluation provides an insight into the economic importance of conserving Ashtamudi estuary. Ferry services, both public and private, are operational in various parts of the estuary. Local fishermen utilize Chinese fishing nets, known as 'Cheenavala' in Malayalam, which are a common sight along the waterway. The lake, along with Quilon Town on its banks and Neendakara Port at the confluence point, serves as transportation hubs for the state's trade and commerce, particularly in the cashew trading and processing industry and marine products industry.

=== Fishing ===
Ashtamudi yields an annual landing of 28,611 metric tons of biomass, based on five years of catch assessments conducted at five sites. This biomass has an estimated market value of 970 million, according to market price data from 2014. The catch is composed predominantly of clams, accounting for 83% of the total, with the remainder being fish (7%), crab (6%), and prawn (4%). In terms of market value in 2014, the catch was valued at Rs. 985 million, with clams contributing the largest share (51%), followed by crab (19%), fish (18%), and prawn (12%).

Trends in the landing of fish, prawn, crab, and clams over the years are depicted in Figure 2.11. The finfish catch includes mullets, pearl spot, catfishes, estuarine sprat, gerrieds, Glossogobius giuris (goby), ambassids, Chanos chanos, and Caranx sp. Among shellfish, Fenneropeanaeus indicus, Metapenaeus dobsoni, Macrobachium rosenbergii, Scylla tranquebarica, S. serrata, and Portunus pelagicus are dominant species in fish landing (Harikishnan, 2015).

Three major types of fisheries are practiced in the estuary: capture, culture, and clam fishing.

=== Coir retting ===
During surveys conducted in 2015, at least 25 retting units were found to be operational around Ashtamudi. The majority of these retting operations are concentrated around Trikkaruva, Thekkumbhagam, and Chavara. The coir thus retted serves as a crucial input for cottage to medium-scale industries, producing ropes, mats, baskets, and wall hangings. Much of the employment in coir processing is provided to womenfolk.

=== Tourism ===
Ashtamudi lake is considered as the entrance to backwaters of Kerala. According to information provided by the District Tourism Promotion Councils (DTPC), the estuary hosts over 50 houseboats. The presence of these houseboats, along with associated tourism activities, supports the livelihoods of hundreds of households within the estuary shore community. A variety of tourism packages are available, connecting all the backwater cities of Kerala, including Kollam, Alappuzha, Kumarakam, Kottayam, and Kochi. Houseboats typically follow a specific navigation path, starting from the Kollam KSWTD boat jetty via National Waterway 3 to Munroe Island. Munroe island in an ideal spot where one can see the coir retting process, coir weaving, fishing, prawns feeding, migratory bird watch, narrow canals and waterways, coconut farms on the lake shore, lagoons, mangrove plants. Sambranikodi Island at the southern tip of Ashtamudi Lake in Kollam has been seeing a rise in tourist flow of late. This is a narrow patch of land popped up a few years ago in the Ashtamudi Lake about 350m away from the Sambranikodi coast and it became a complete isle after soil dredged for the construction of the national highway was dumped in the backwaters.

Currently, it is estimated that nearly 25,000 tourists visit the estuary each year. The prestigious President Trophy Boat Race (Vallam kali), held annually on November 1 in the Estuary, commemorating the day Kerala State was created, serves as a major attraction.

== Deterioration of the lake environment ==
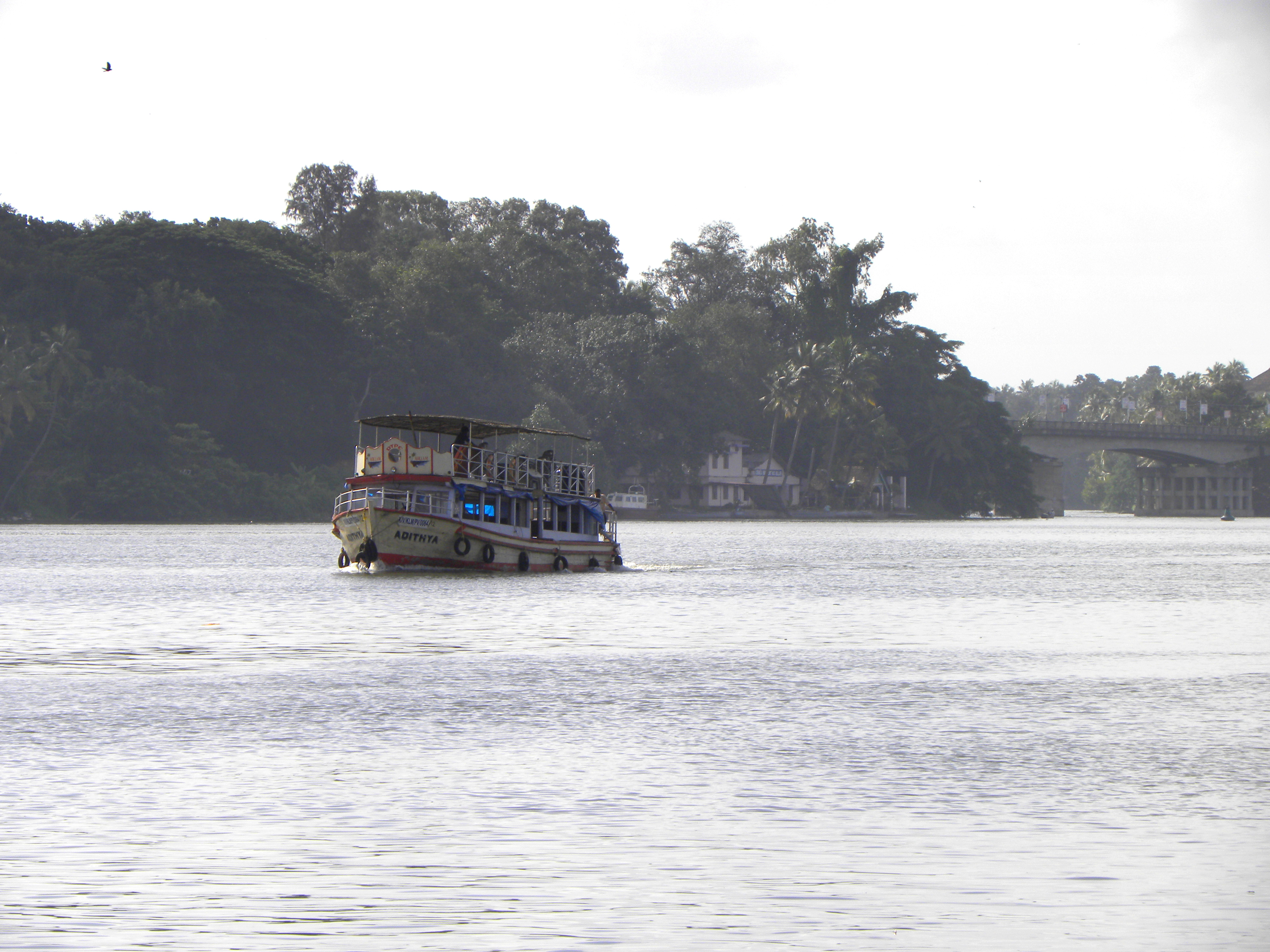
A moving ferry on Lake Ashtamudi at Kollam city

The following are reported to be the reasons for deterioration of the lake environment:

1. Intense anthropogenic pressure.
2. Oil spills from thousands of fishing boats and from industries in the surrounding area.
3. Dwindling of the fragile lake zone due to conversion/destruction of natural habitats for development purposes (reported that the lake which had an area of 54 km^{2} [21 mi^{2}] according to old survey reports has shrunk to 34 km^{2} [13 mi^{2}] due to encroachments)
4. Large quantities of untreated sewage, disposal of human excreta, and the pollution from paper mills, industries (aluminum, ceramics, seafood), as well as from coconut husk retting.
5. Many fish species may have become extinct due to lack of spawning facilities on the banks of the lake due to canalization of the lake's banks by walls built of laterite and granite stones (these walls reportedly cover 80 per cent of the lake's banks)

An analysis of the water quality of the lake from 2019 to 2021 under the State Water Quality Monitoring Programme revealed that the maximum total coliform count, indicating faecal contamination, was in the range of 540 MPN/100 ml to 920 MPN/100 ml. A major contributor to the pollution of the lake is sewage from households and establishments, said a report submitted by the board on the ecological condition of the Ashtamudi Lake before the National Green Tribunal on August 17, 2022. A survey conducted by the Kerala State Pollution Control Board (PCB) revealed that Ashtamudi Lake is facing pollution stress caused by various factors, such as solid waste dumping and sewage discharge. With numerous drainage channels from households and businesses flowing into the lake, local authorities have been directed to implement urgent remedial actions.Garbage covers many areas, including Link Road, Pullikada, Thoppil Kadav, and Manichithodu. The area opposite the KSRTC bus stand in the city center is heavily littered with various types of waste.

=== Extinction of Kanjiracode creek ===
Kanjiracode creek on the south-east end of the lake, one arm of the Ashtamudi, has suffered extinction due to the dumping of waste earth and clay into the lake by the Kerala Ceramics Limited (KCL) at Kundara, a state government-owned public sector unit. A university professor who has studied this aspect wonders

whether the lake would have to be soon rechristened "Sapthamudi" or the lake with seven locks of hair.

The loss to people due to destruction of the creek is stated to be:

a) "Karimeen" (pearl spot) and "kanambu" (mullet) fish varieties once the livelihood of fishermen have disappeared and resulting in the migration of the fishermen to Paravur and Varkala in the south and even Kannur in the north.

b) People dependent on coir for a livelihood used the lake to soak husks but now the Kanjiracode coir industry is non-existent due to closure of the creek resulting in migration of coir workers to other places for a living.

=== Microplastic pollution ===
A recent study has revealed the extent of microplastic pollution in Ashtamudi Lake, a Ramsar wetland in Kollam district, highlighting the necessity for ongoing monitoring and addressing "potential public health concerns."

The study discovered microplastics in the lake's fish, shellfish, sediment, and water. The highest percentage of microplastics was found in the macrofauna, with fish containing 19.6% and shellfish 40.9%. Fibers made up 35.6% of the microplastics found in the collected samples, followed closely by fragments at 33.3% and films at 28%. "Notably, the majority of particles were in the smaller size range, suggesting their potential bioavailability to aquatic organisms," the study noted.

Hazardous heavy metals, including molybdenum, iron, and barium, were detected in the microplastics, potentially adsorbed from the surroundings. These findings pose potential risks to aquatic organisms and human beings.

== Restoration plans ==
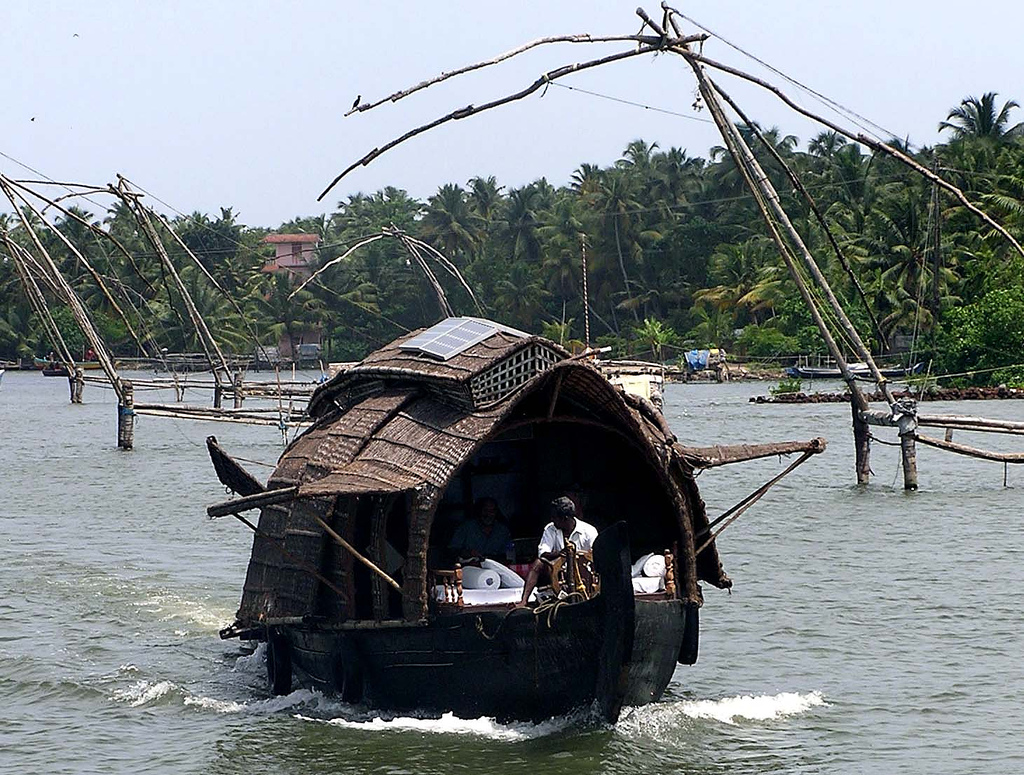
A house boat seen in Ashtamudi lake with Chinese nets in the background

The Asia Development Assistance Facility of the New Zealand Government has carried out a study with the objective of evolving a management plan for sustainable management of the estuary for ecosystem development. The shores of the lake are home to important species of rare birds and animals. Any decisions made concerning the Ashtamudi Estuary's resources and its sustainable management significance is dictated by about a million people who live on its shores and the large species of rare birds and animals which provide the equally important biodiversity to the lake's environs. The Plan envisages:

- Identify and phase out of the pollution sources
- Better sanitation, reduction of industrial growth and reduction of urban waste to ensure the maintainable water quality of the estuary.
- Address the declining fish stock production through concerted efforts to conserve the fish stock of the estuary in a sustainable manner and with community participation
- Product diversification of coir to ensure better economic returns to people with the coordination of self-help groups
- Improved shore protection through mangrove afforestation for ecosystem development on the banks of the estuary
- Mining to be allowed selectively at village level, away from the banks of the lake
- Discontinue estuary reclamation
- Set defined navigation routes undisturbed by fishing nets
- Neendakara port to be provided with improved sanitation facilities, enhanced boat-fuelling terminals and drainage terminals.
- Promote ecotourism with better facilities of inland navigation and services in the form of:
  - developing of marine bio-reserve, nature island and mangrove conservation area
  - visits to temples nearby and other places of cultural and archeological importance
  - visits to coir-producing villages, rubber-producing villages, rice fields, fish hatcheries and other biodiversity hot spots

The above activities have been suggested for implementation in the Vellimon Kayal, a relatively unspoiled part of the estuary.

With funds provided by the Union Ministry of Environment and Forests, revival of mangrove forests was done which is reported to be partially successful (out of 2,40,000 mangrove saplings planted over a period of two years 30,000 are reported to be surviving).

== Perumon Disaster ==
The Perumon Disaster was a catastrophic railway accident that occurred on July 8, 1988, near Perumon in the Kollam district of Kerala, India. The accident involved the derailment of the Island Express train, which was traveling from Bangalore to Thiruvananthapuram, while it was crossing the Perumon bridge over Ashtamudi Lake. The Island Express derailed while crossing the Perumon bridge, causing eight of its coaches to fall into the Ashtamudi Lake. The disaster resulted in the deaths of 105 passengers, with many others injured.

== Recent cultural implications ==
There is a 1978 Indian Malayalam-language film Ashtamudikkaayal with Prem Nazir, Jayabharathi, Adoor Bhasi and Sreelatha Namboothiri in the lead roles. Various poems of Thirunellur Karunakaran including Rani has the lake as centre theme.

== Gallery ==
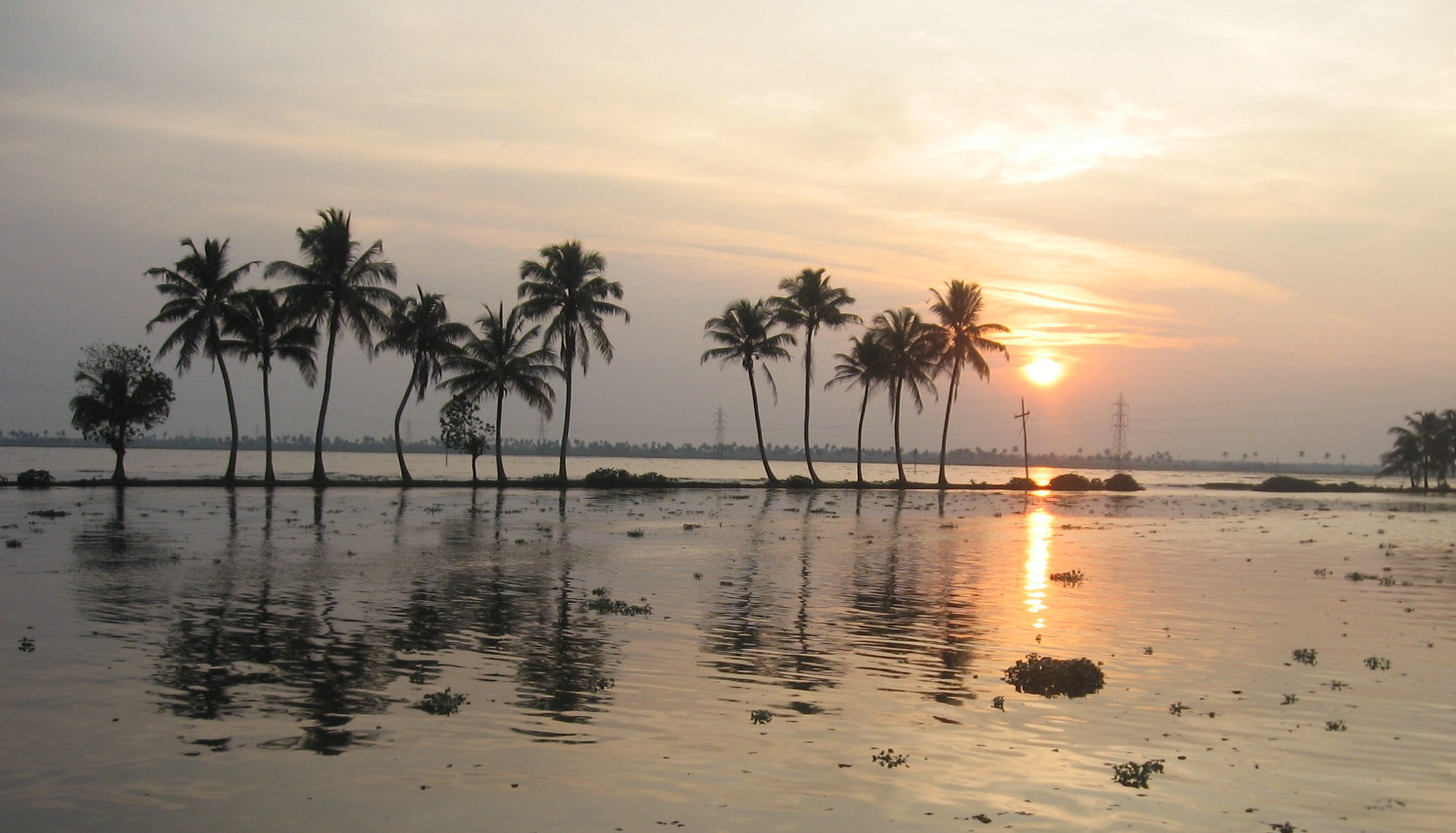
Backwaters at sunset

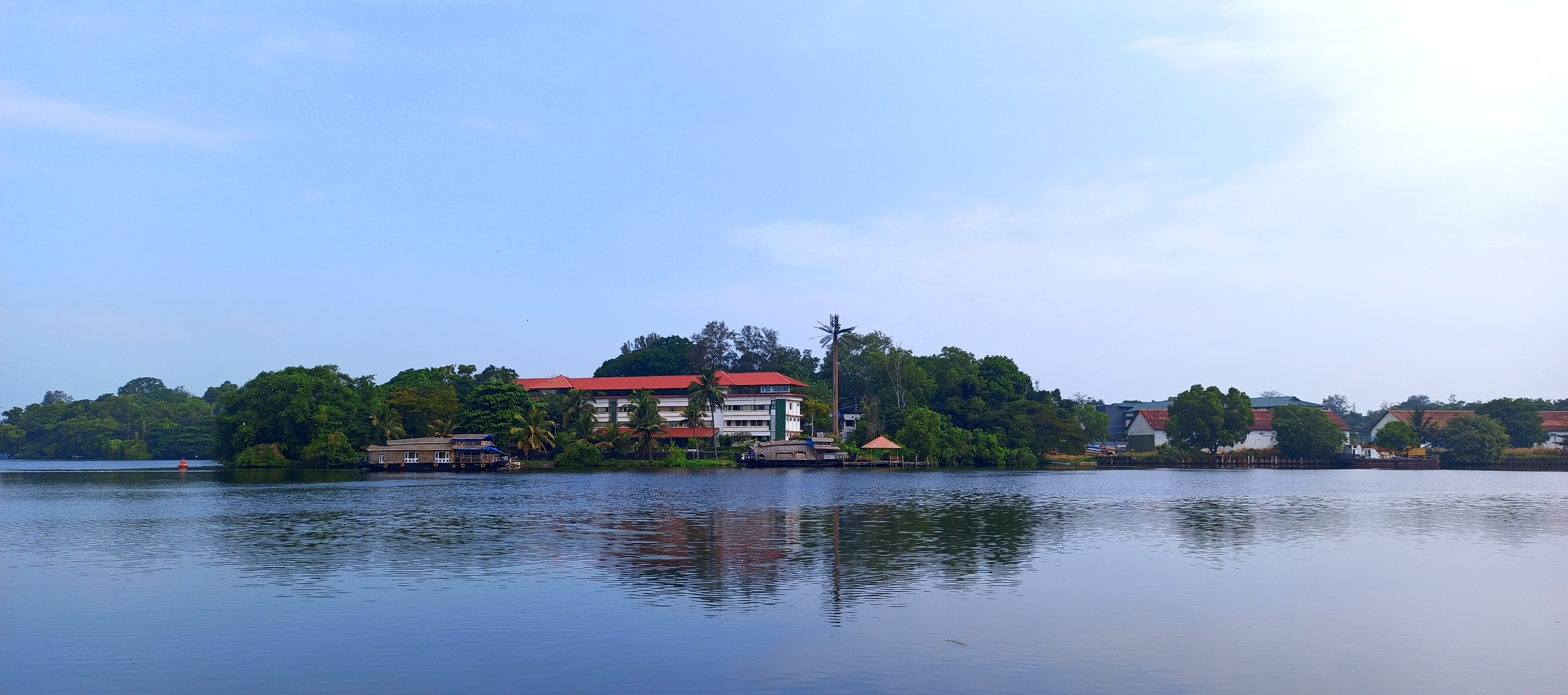
Lake near Kollam KSRTC Depot

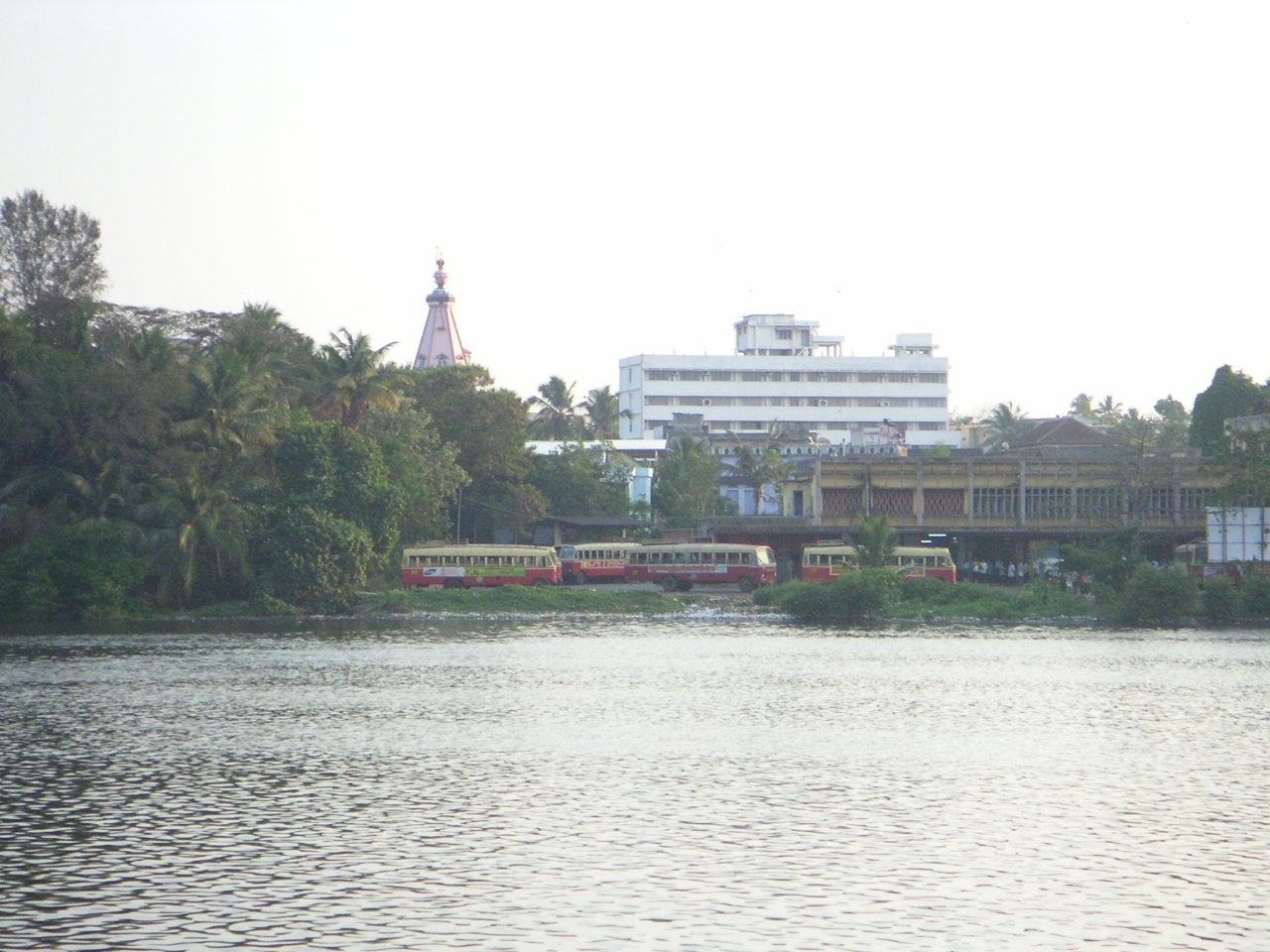
Ashtamudi Lake with Quilon on its banks

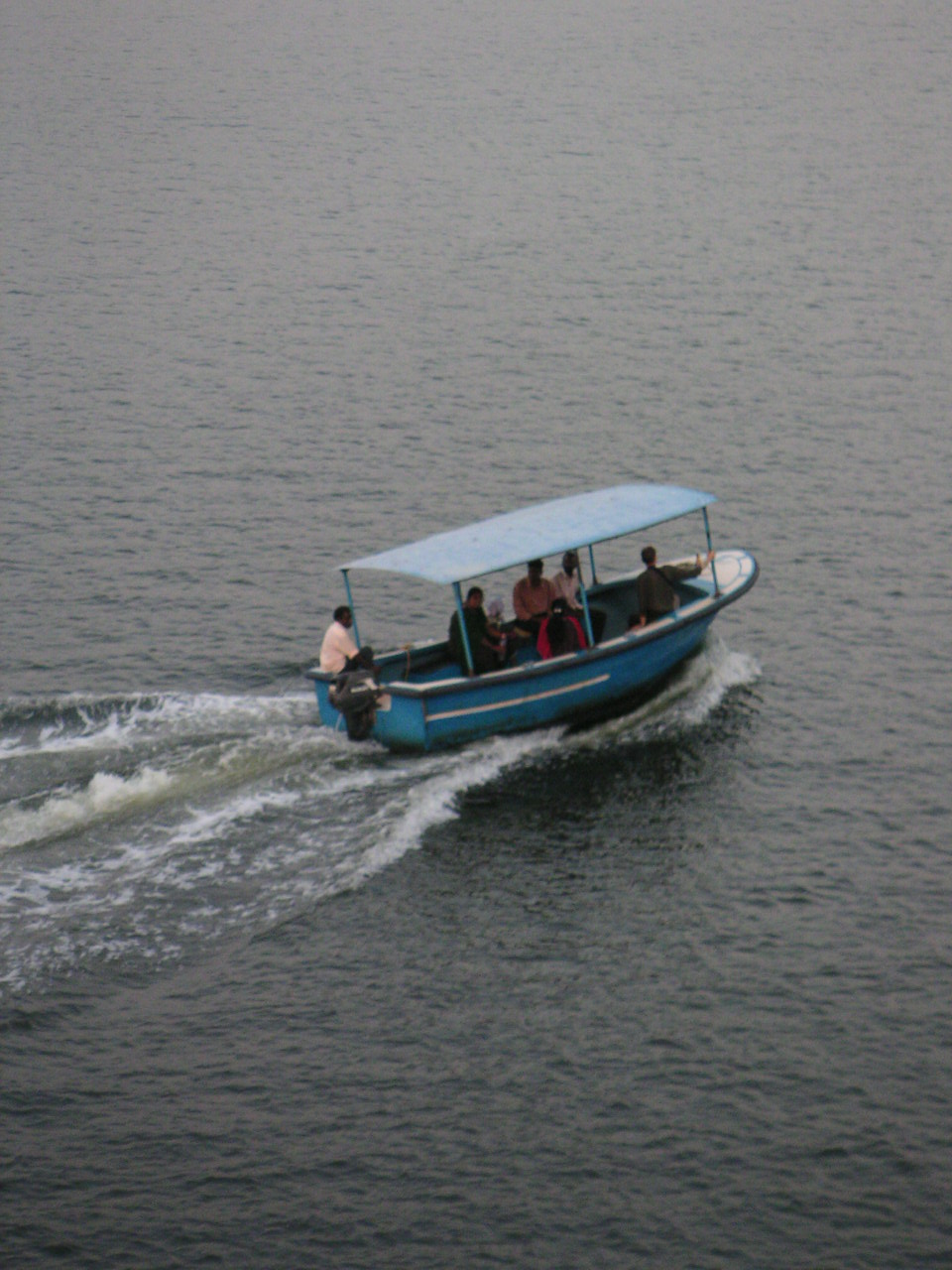
Mechanised boats plying in the backwater

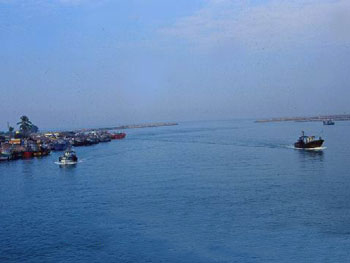
As the lake joins the sea

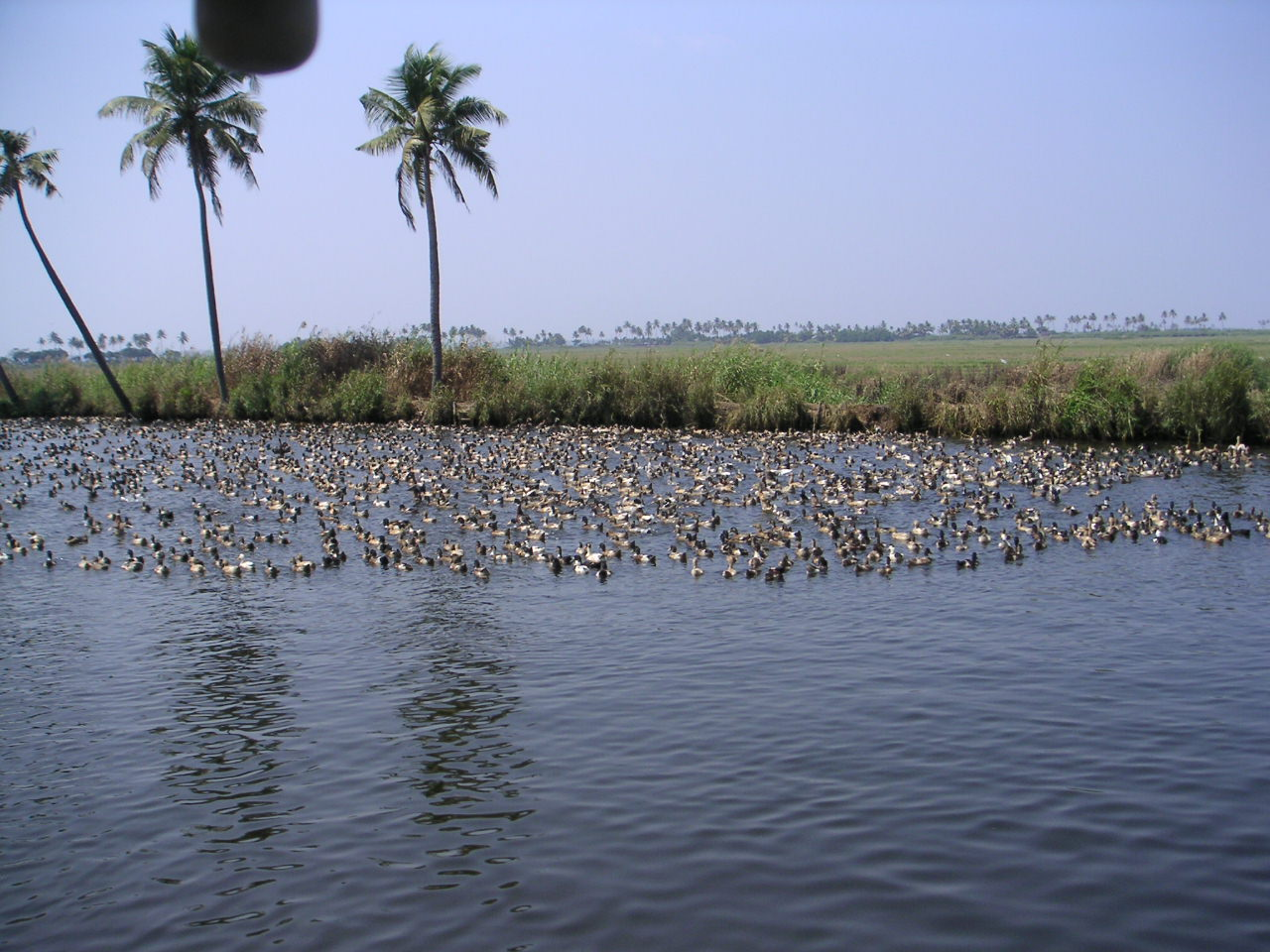
Ducks in the lake

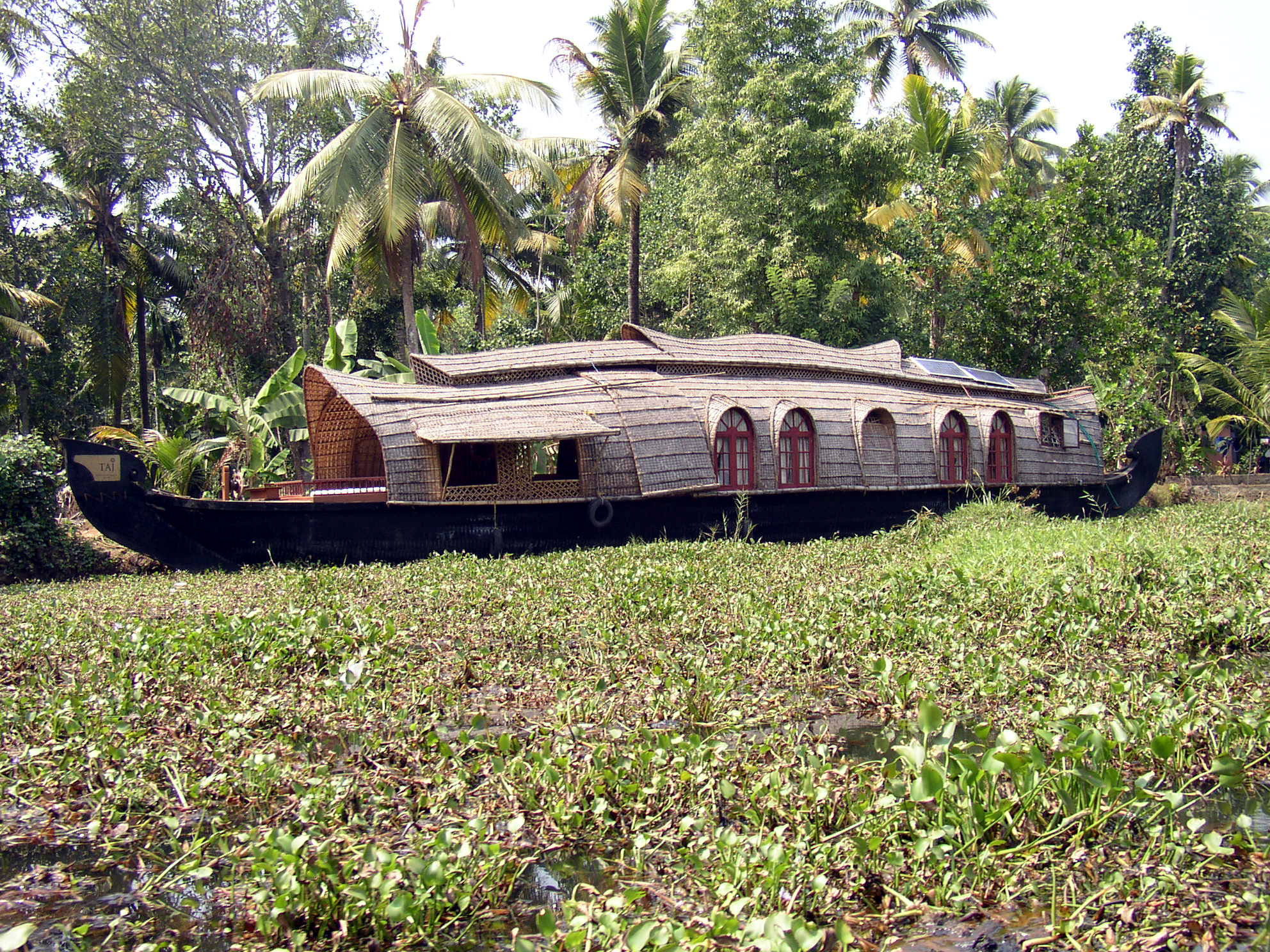
Houseboat in the midst of weeds in the backwaters

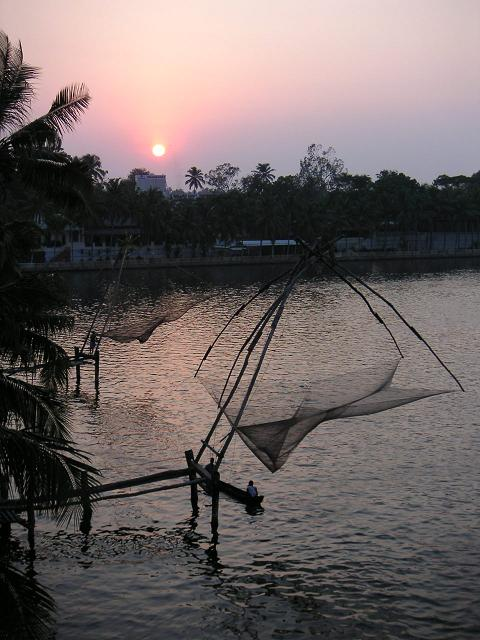
Traditional Chinese fishing net in Ashtamudi Lake

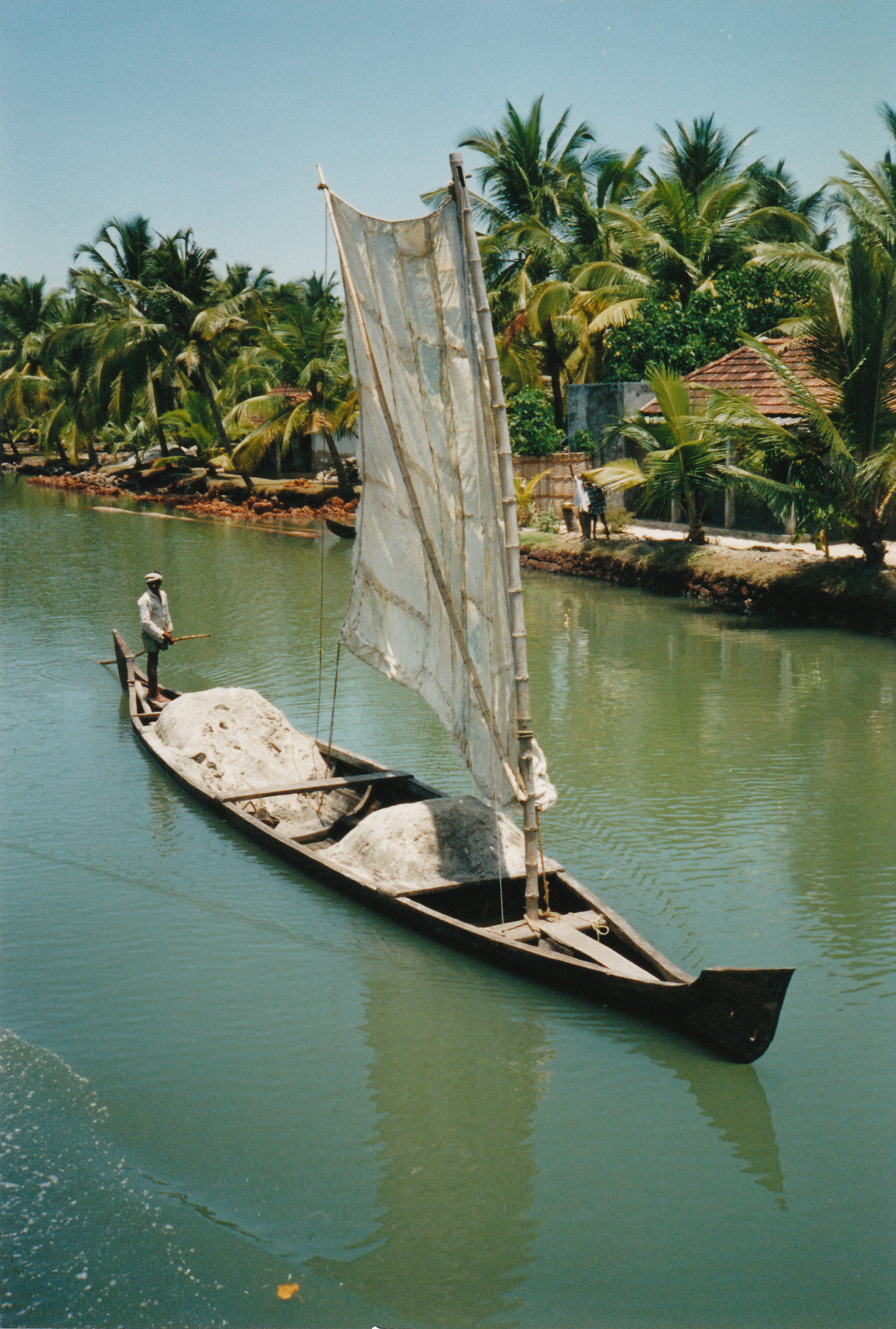
Traditional merchant boat on the backwaters (Kerala)

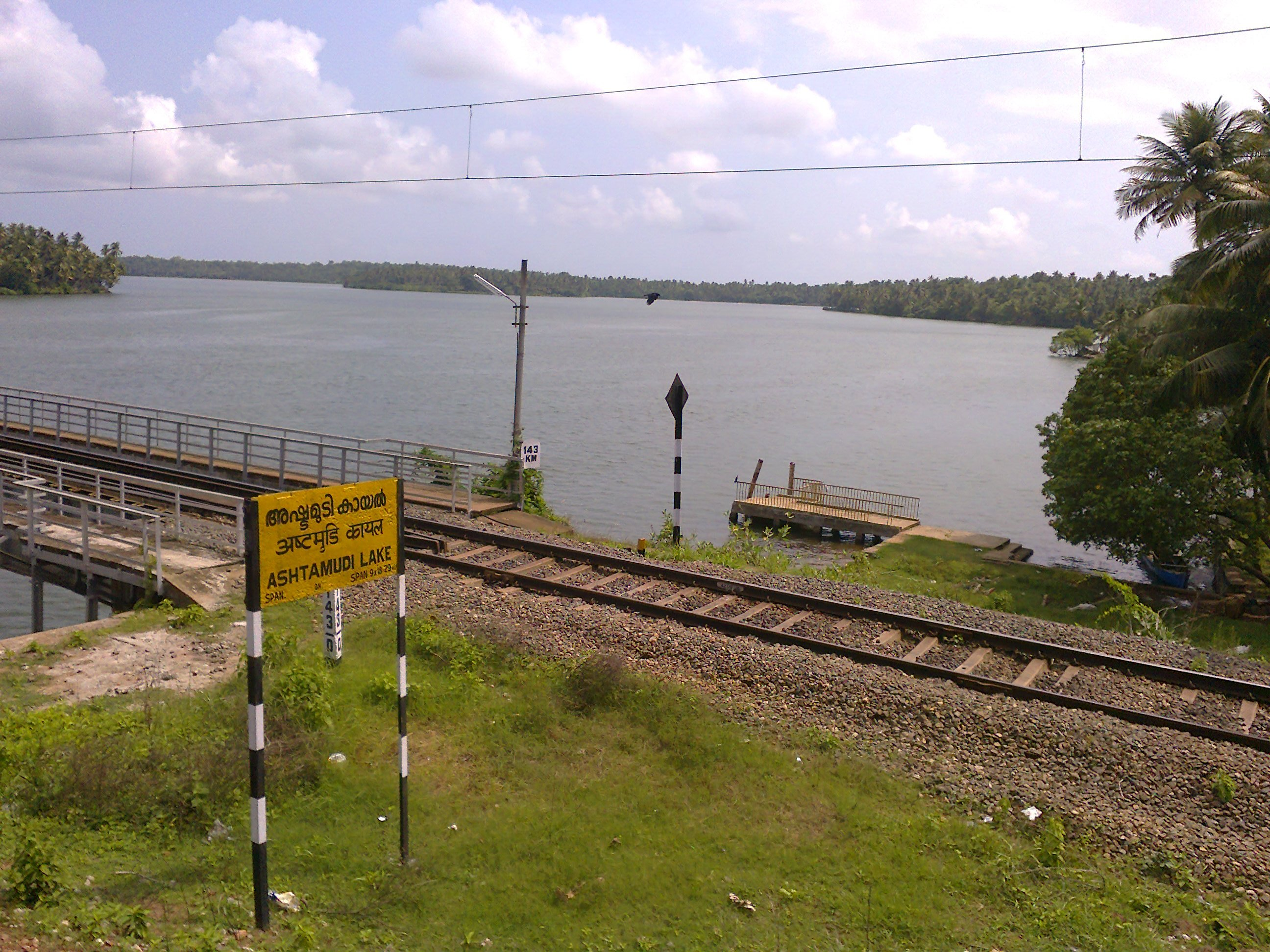
Ashtamudi Lake

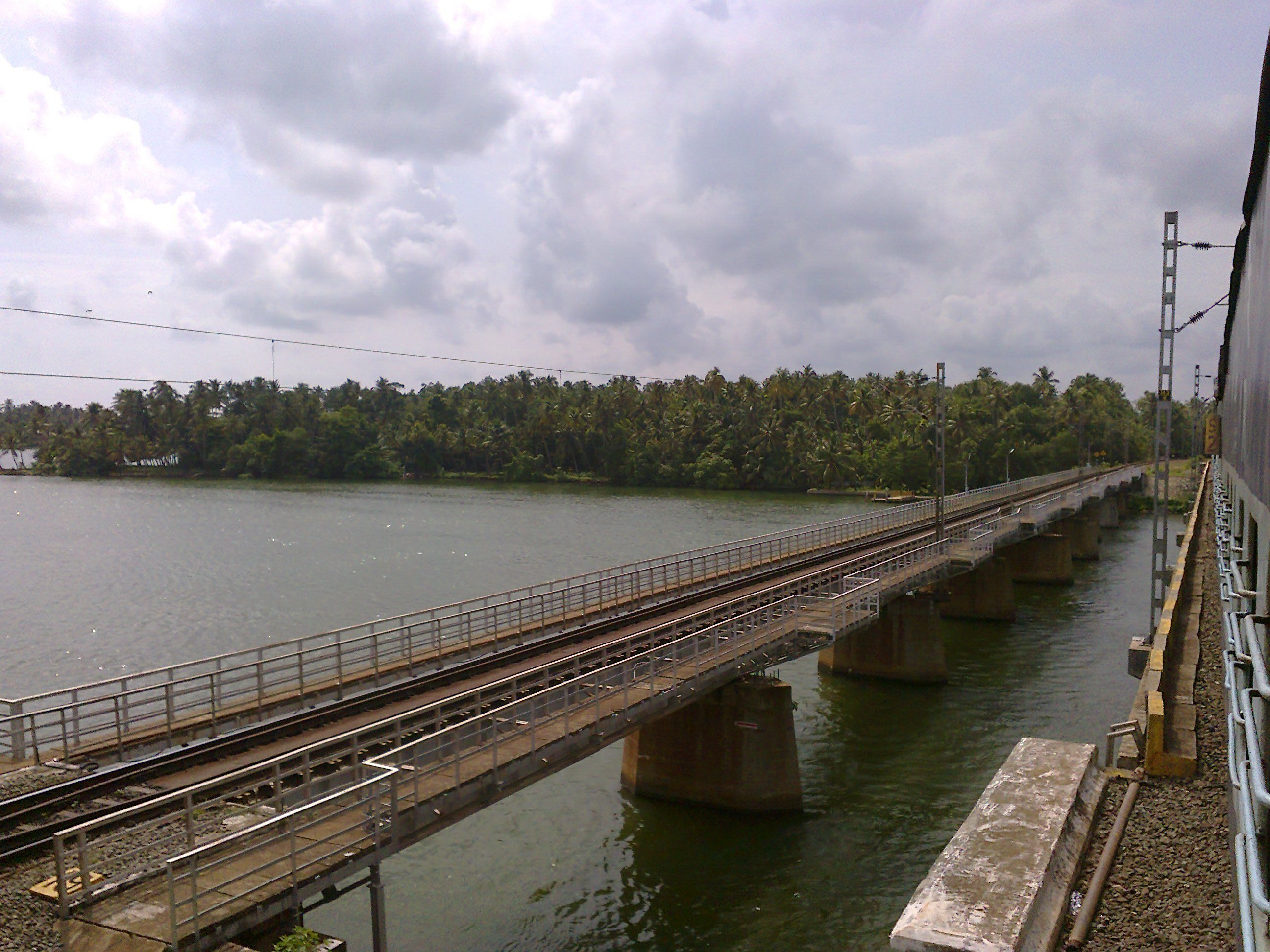
Ashtamudi Lake 2
