= Perayam, Kollam =

Perayam Perayam
- village
- Location in Kerala, India Perayam (India)
- Coordinates: 8.990888°N 76.666718°E
- Country: India
- State: Kerala
- District: Kollam
- Elevation: 30 m (98 ft)

Languages
  - Official: Malayalam, English
- Time zone: UTC+5:30 (IST)
- PIN: 691 503
- Telephone code: 0474
- ISO 3166 code: IN-KL-2 XXXX
- Vehicle registration: KL-02
- Nearest city: Kollam City (22 km)
- Sex ratio: 55:45 ♂/♀
- Literacy: 90%
- Lok Sabha constituency: Kollam
- Climate: Tropical monsoon (Köppen)
- Avg. summer temperature: 35 °C (95 °F)
- Avg. winter temperature: 20 °C (68 °F)
- Website: www.perayam.com

Perayam is a panchayat in the Kollam district of Kerala, India. The nearest town is Kundara, a major industry hub of Kollam district.

== Economy ==
The main sources of income for inhabitants are private employment, government employment, cultivation (mainly of coconut and paddy), fishing, and some overseas employment.
