= Suresh Pillai =

Indian chef and restaurateur

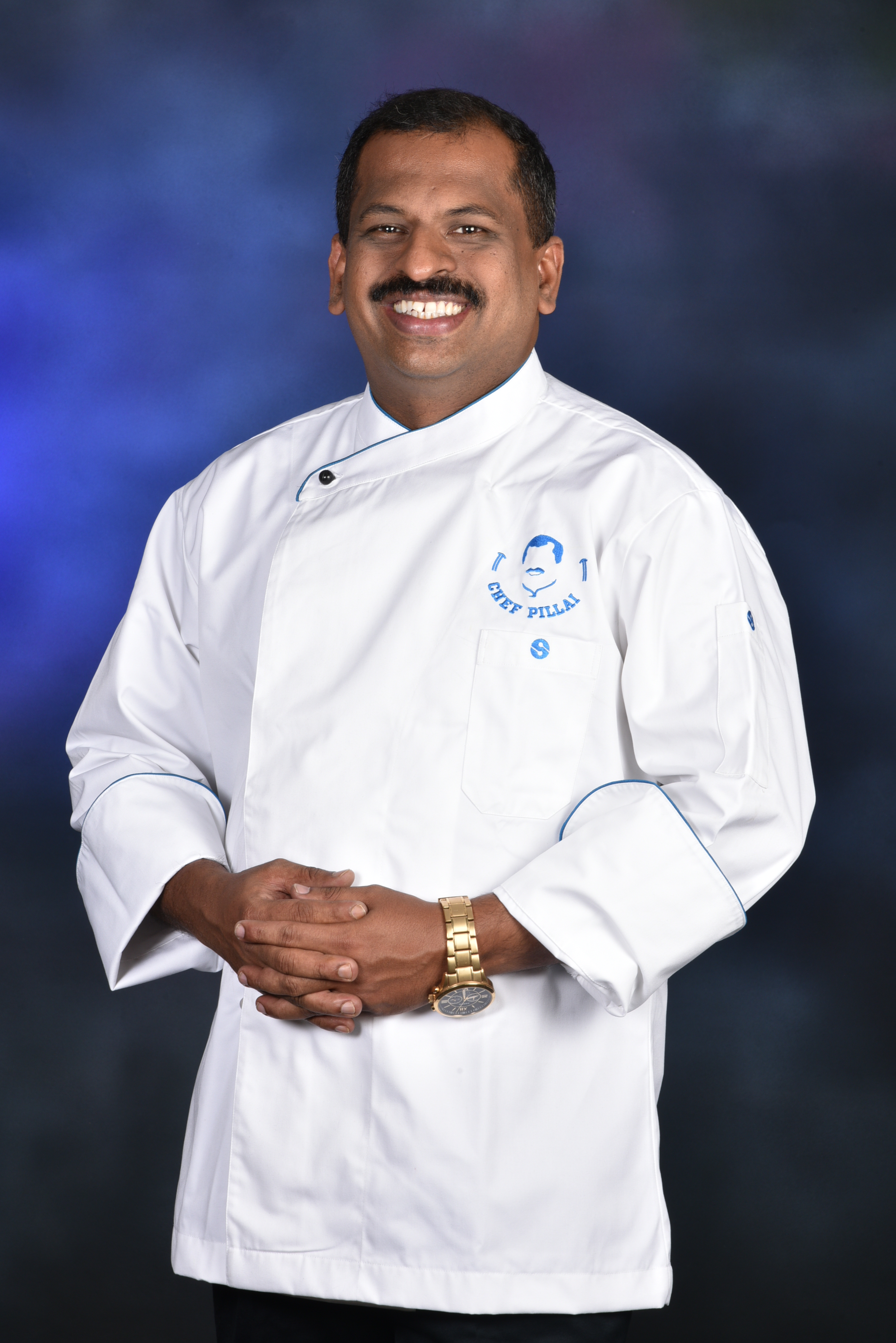
- Born: Suresh Sasidharan Pillai; Thekkumbhagom, Kollam, Kerala
- Citizenship: British
- Spouse: Remya Suresh
- Children: 2
- Culinary career
- Cooking style: Kerala cuisine
- Current restaurants: Restaurant Chef Pillai; The Raviz
- Television show: MasterChef: The Professionals
- Website: chefpillai.com

Suresh Pillai is an Indian-born British chef and restaurateur. He worked as chef de partie, sous-chef, and chef de cuisine at various restaurants in London for 14 years, including Veeraswamy and Gymkhana. He holds British citizenship. In 2017, he contested in the British reality TV show MasterChef: The Professionals on BBC Two. He returned to India to become the corporate chef and culinary director of The Raviz. He also started his own restaurant chain branded Restaurant Chef Pillai.

== Early life ==
Suresh Pillai was born in Thekkumbhagom, Kollam, Kerala to Sasidharan Pillai and Radhamma who were coir labourers. He completed his schooling from GPHSS, Chavara South. He was a chess player, and participated at the state and national level. He was the under-18 champion of Kollam district.

== Career ==
Suresh started his career in 1993 at the age of 17 as waiter at a restaurant Chef King in Kollam, Kerala after his high school education. He assisted the chef part-time, and later joined the kitchen where he learnt basic cooking skills. Three years later he moved to Casino Hotel in Calicut (now Kozhikode), where he learnt Malabar cuisine. Four years later, in 1998 he moved to Coconut Grove, Bangalore. He worked for six years and was promoted to head chef. He learnt cooking in South Indian cuisines such as Coorgi, Chettinad and Konkani. He then joined his first five star hotel The Leela Palace at Bangalore, at the starting position of management trainee, as without a culinary degree the position didn't consider his previous experience.

In 2005, he joined the Veeraswamy restaurant at London. He then joined as sous-chef at Purple Poppadom in Cardiff and later as head chef at Cinnamon Culture in London and again as sous-chef at Gymkhana and later as head chef at Darbaar Restaurant and later at Hoppers. He became the corporate chef and Culinary Director at The Raviz Hotel, Kollam. He has been a guest lecturer and guest chef at University of the Bahamas in its Culinary and Hospitality Management Institute.

In 2021, he started his own restaurant branded Restaurant Chef Pillai in Bangalore and another one in 2022 at hotel Le Meridien, Kochi.

== In the media ==
In 2017, he contested in the British reality TV show MasterChef: The Professionals (series 10) on BBC Two. He prepared a soufflé in the first round and a traditional Kerala fish curry and a twist of mashed potato and pachadi in the second round. In 2021, he made a guest appearance in the Malayalam TV serial Mounaragam in the role of a cookery show judge. In 2022, he contested in the game show Flowers Oru Kodi hosted by Sreekandan Nair on Flowers. That year, he also joined the cooking game show Kutti Kalavara Seniors on Flowers as a judge. He also made his film debut in 2022 with a guest appearance as himself in the Malayalam film Cheena Trophy. He had a role in the film Neru directed by Jeethu Joseph in 2023.

== Personal life ==
In mid-2005, he was living in London and received British citizenship. He is married to Remya Suresh and they have two children. He moved to India with his family in 2020.
