= Panakkattodil Devi Temple =

Hindu temple in Kerala, India

- Panakkattodil Devi Temple, Chavara Thekkumbhagom, Kollam, Kerala

Religion
- Affiliation: Hinduism
- District: Kollam
- Deity: Durga (The idol is that of a serene form) and Kali (with equal importance) along with Ganapathy, Dharma Sastha, Brahma Rakshas, Nagadevar
- Festival: Thalappoli
- Governing body: Travancore Devaswom Board, Kerala

Location
- Location: Chavara Thekkumbhagom
- State: Kerala
- Country: India
- Interactive map of Panakkattodil Devi Temple
- Coordinates: 8°57′13.2″N 76°33′36.0″E

Architecture
- Type: Traditional Kerala style
- Completed: Not known (Before 1000 years)

Specifications
- Temple: One
- Elevation: 37.75 m (124 ft)

Panakkattodil Devi Temple (Malayalam: പനയ്ക്കറ്റോടില്‍ ദേവീ ക്ഷേത്രം) is a Hindu temple in Chavara Thekkumbhagom village in Kollam district of the Indian state of Kerala. Primary deity of this temple is Durga. The temple is managed by the Travancore Devaswom Board, Kerala. The Thalappoli in 'Meda Bharani' and the annual festival during the months of April and May are popular.

== History ==
Panakkattodil devi temple is an ancient and famous Hindu devi temple in South Kerala, located in Chavara Thekkumbhagom in Kollam District. There is no historical evidence available for the origin of this temple. But believe it as 1000 years old. Once a rover Brahmin youngster reached at Chavara Thekkumbhagom. He met a skilled carpenter called 'Koyippurathu Nambeesan Aasari'. They planned to build a temple in Chavara Thekkumbhagom. Nambeesan Aasari built base structure of the temple, then the Brahmin youngster evoke 'Bhadrakali' to this temple and adored. After that various parts of the temples had built and numerous devotees reach to the temple. Temple built in Valayaappallil Family' property. According to some records, temple build under the supervision of 'Manjippuzha Thamburan'. In 1946 (Malayalam Era or Kollavarsham 1121) temple undertaken by Travancore Government.

== Location and transport ==
Panakkattodil Devi temple is located with the geographic coordinates of 8°57′13.2″N 76°33′36.0″E at an altitude of about 37.75 m above the mean sea level.

=== Air ===
Trivandrum International airport (92 km) is the nearest airport.

=== Rail ===
Nearest and main railway station is Kollam railway station (18 km). Kollam railway station is well-connected by regular trains with Thiruvananthapuram and some major places in India. Another nearby station is Karunagappally railway station (21 km).

=== Roads ===
Chavara Thekkumbhagom is well connected to other parts of Kerala through roads. The main roads in the Panchayath meet National Highway 66 at Vettuthara Jn. in Neendakara Panchayath, Kuttivattom Junction in Karunagappally Municipality, Kottamkulangara Junction in Chavara Panchayath. There is a KSRTC bus station in the temple complex. Buses ply from the nearest bus depot in Kollam (15 km) and Karunagappally (19 km). Transport is provided by the Kerala State Road Transport Corporation and private transport bus operators from Thekkumbhagom to Karunagappally via Pavumba bridge and Karunagappally to Kollam via Thekkumbhagom and Pallikkodi-Dalavapuram bridge (Inaugurated in 2007). The first trip starts at 5.00 AM to Kayamkulam and the last trip at 9.50 PM from Karunagappally to Thekkumbhagom. Road transport is also supported by private taxis and autorickshaws.

=== Water ===
The State water Transport Department operates boat services from Kollam to West Kallada, Muthirapparambu, Munroe Island and Alappuzha. The main boat jetty near the temple is Pallikkodi.

== See also ==
- Chavara Thekkumbhagom
- Kollam
