= Islands of Kollam =

City of Kollam or Quilon is known as Prince of Arabian Sea, situated on the banks of Arabian Sea and Ashtamudi Lake. A major portion of Kollam Municipal Corporation area is occupied by Ashtamudi Lake. It is the most visited backwater and lake of Kerala, with a unique wetland ecosystem, a palm-shaped (also called octopus-shaped) large water body, next only to the Vembanad estuary ecosystem of the state. Ashtamudi means 'eight coned'(Ashta = 'eight'; mudi = 'coned') in the local language of Malayalam. This name is indicative of the lake's topography: a lake with multiple branches. The lake is also called the gateway to the backwaters of Kerala. This lake is extremely famous for House Boat and Backwater Resorts.

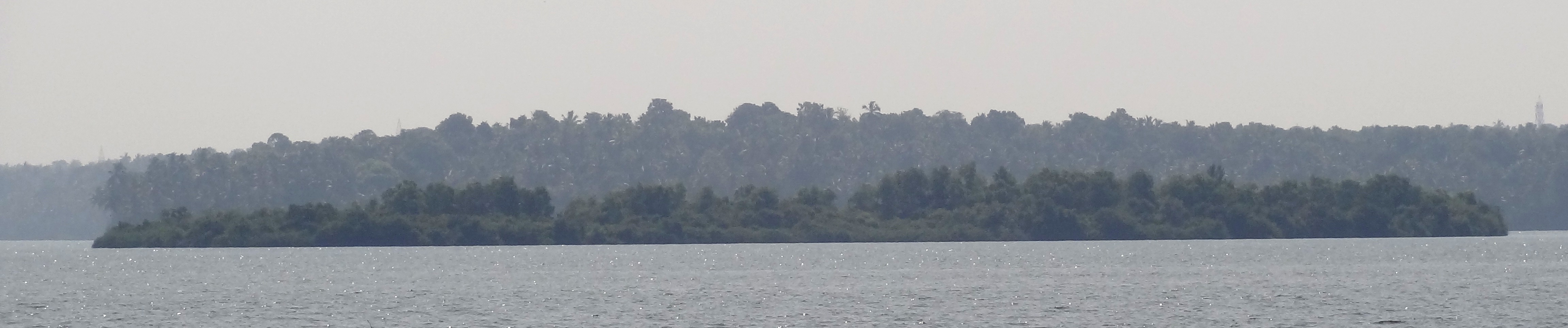
Uninhabited island in Munroe

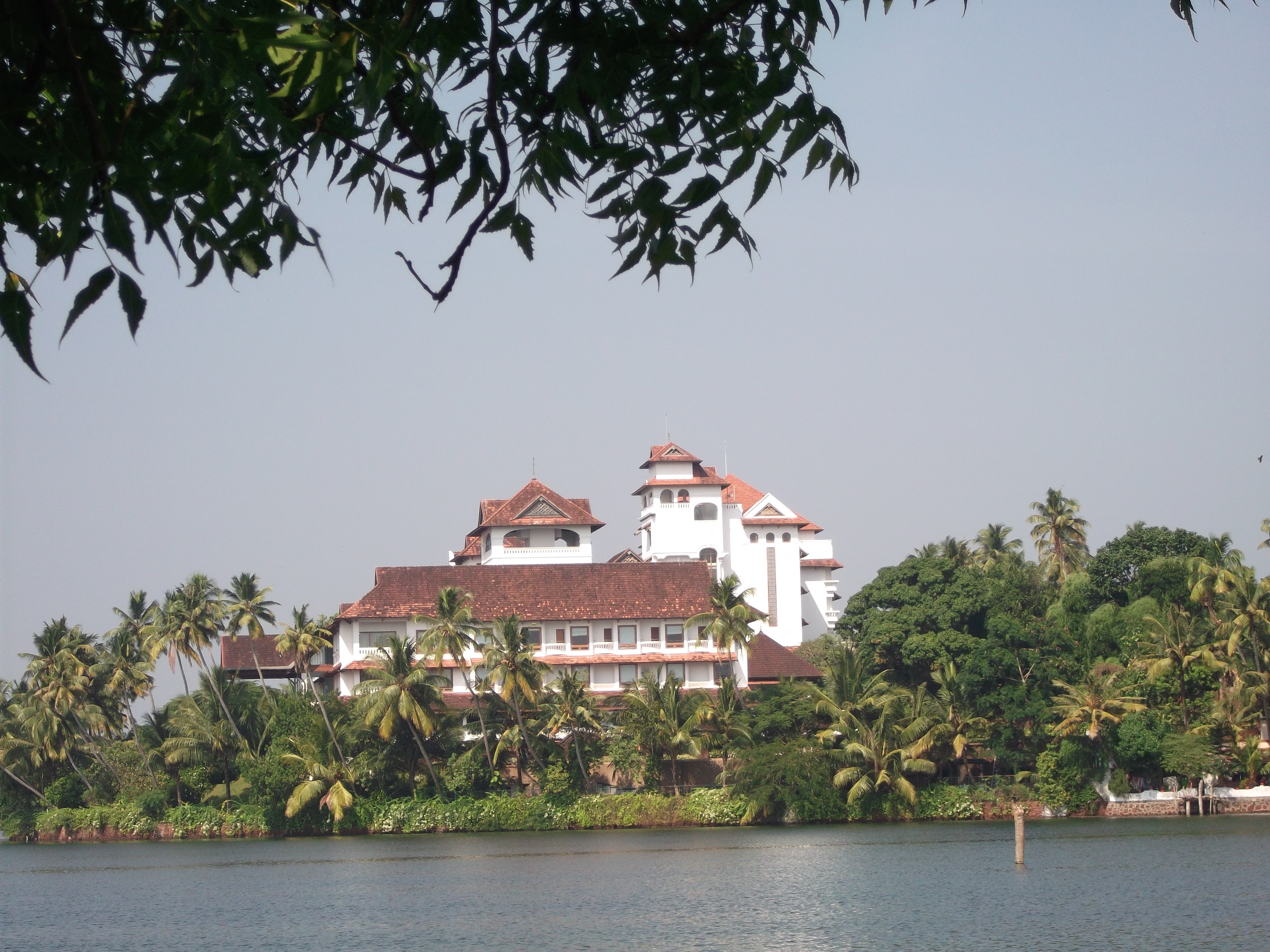
Five star hotel 'The Raviz' in Kollam is situated at one of the island like structure near Thevally

All the islands in Kollam are situated in Ashtamudi Lake. There are so many islands in Ashtamudi Lake. Munroe Island and Chavara Thekkumbhagom are the most important among these islands. Islands are the eye-catching factors as well as the beauty of Lake Ashtamudi. Most of these islands are potential tourism spots in the state. Even Indian Railways also planning to develop one of the islands in Kollam, Pallanthurthi, for a tourism project. There are big as well as small islands which are inhabited and uninhabited by human beings. The important islands in Kollam are:

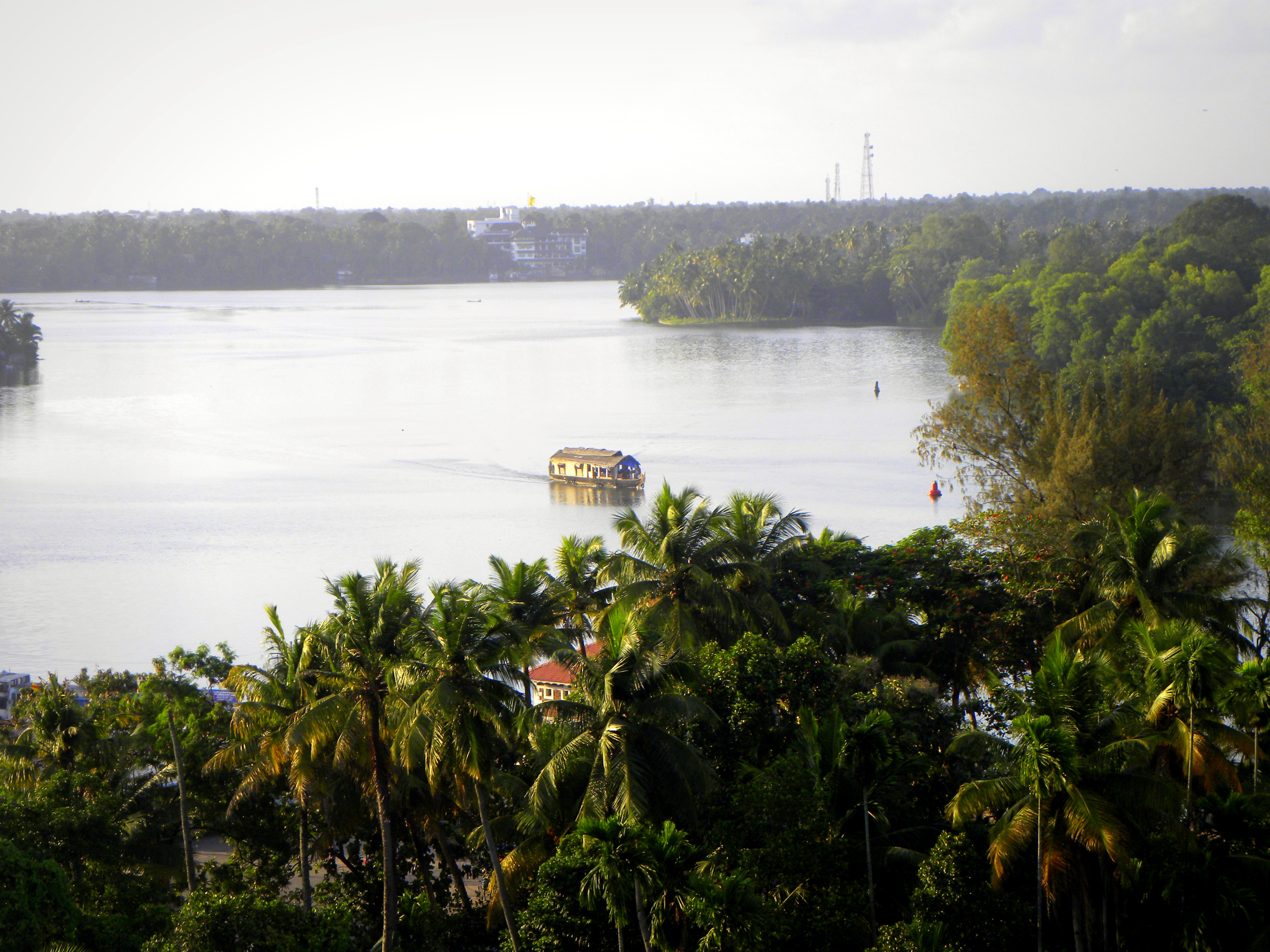
Aerial view of Ashtamudi backwaters

- Munroe Island
- Chavara Thekkumbhagom
- Pallanthurthi
- St. Sebastian Island
- San Thome Island (Thomasthuruth)
- Vincent Island
- Our Lady of Fatima Island (Fatimathuruth)
- Pezhumthuruth
- Kakkathuruth
- Pattamthuruth
- Paliyanthuruthu (Palliyamthuruthu)
- Neettum thuruth
- Puthenthuruth
- Poothuruth
- Pannaykkathuruth
- Veluthuruth
- Neeleswaram thuruth
- Cheekenthuruth
- Kerolithuruth
- Kanakkanthurth
- Pushpamangalamthuruth
- Josephthuruth

== Impact of Coastal Regulation Zone(CRZ) act ==
Being one of the coastal cities in India, the Coastal Regulation Zone Act(CRZ) has relevance in the development of Kollam city and nearby islands. As per the third report submitted by the Coastal district committees (CDC), constituted by the government following the directive of the Supreme Court of India, Kollam topped the list with 4,868 violations whereas the total violations identified are 26,259 in the state. In February 2020, 184 islands in Kollam have been brought under the CRZ regime. New construction in these islands would be permitted within areas between High Tide Line (HTL) and 50 meters towards the landward side.

== See also ==
- Kollam Parappu (Quilon bank)
