= Dutch Church, Munroe Island =

Dutch Church
- Dutch Church, Munroe Island, Kollam
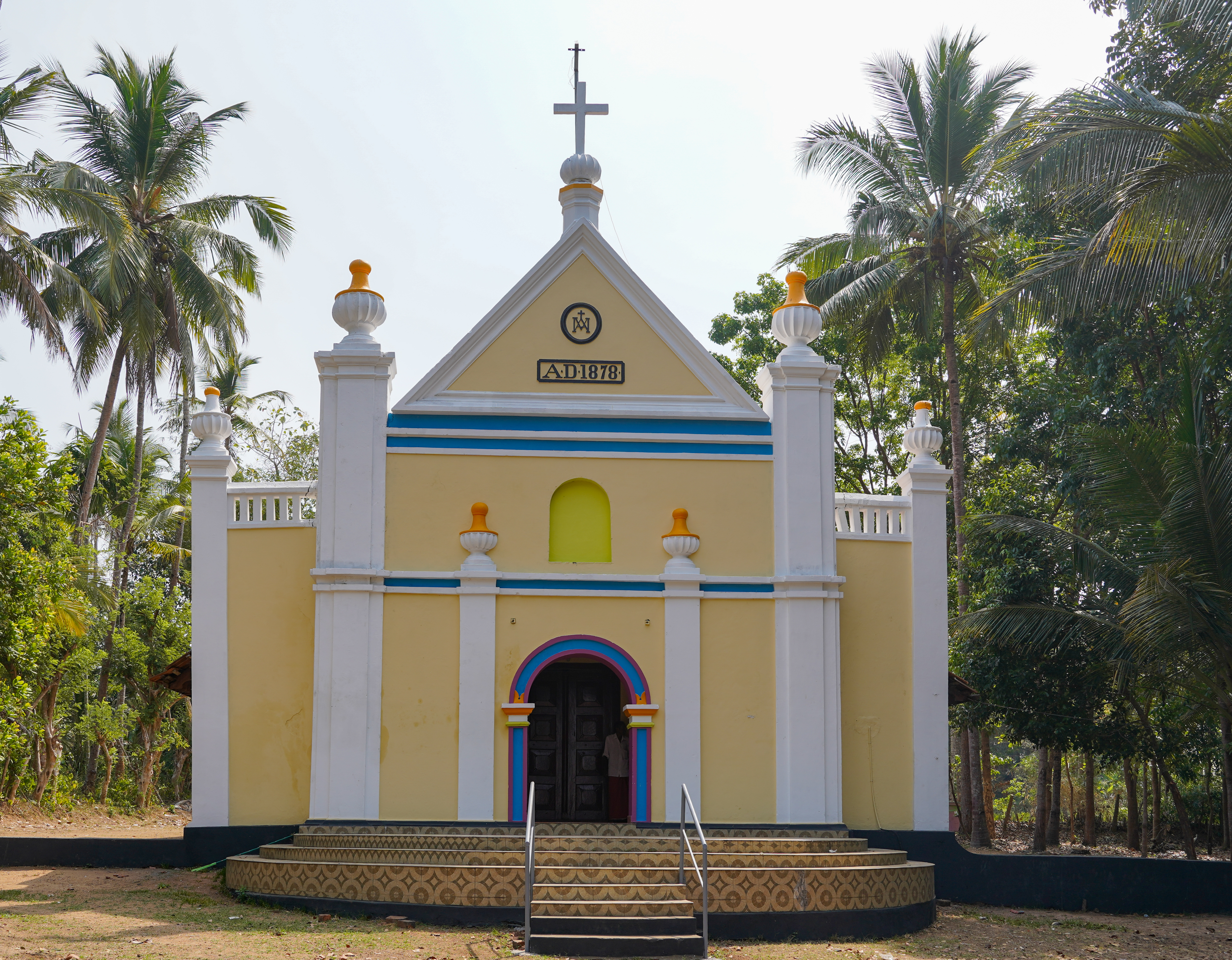
- Church building in Munroe Island
- Dutch Church
- 8.9815°N 76.60858°E
- Location: Munroe Island, Kollam (Quilon)
- Country: India

History
- Status: Church
- Founded: 1878

Architecture
- Functional status: Inactive
- Style: Dutch
- Completed: 1878

Specifications
- Materials: Red Brick

The Dutch Church in Munroe Island, Kollam is one of the old churches in Kerala. The church was built by the Dutch in 1878. The red brick church on the scenic banks of Lake Ashtamudi is a blend of Dutch-Kerala architecture. The only Christian family in the locality is looking after the affairs of this Church. The annual church festival is conducted with the help of the Hindu population residing in the area. It is a good example for the communal harmony existing in Munroe Island in God's own Country (Kerala).

== Gallery ==
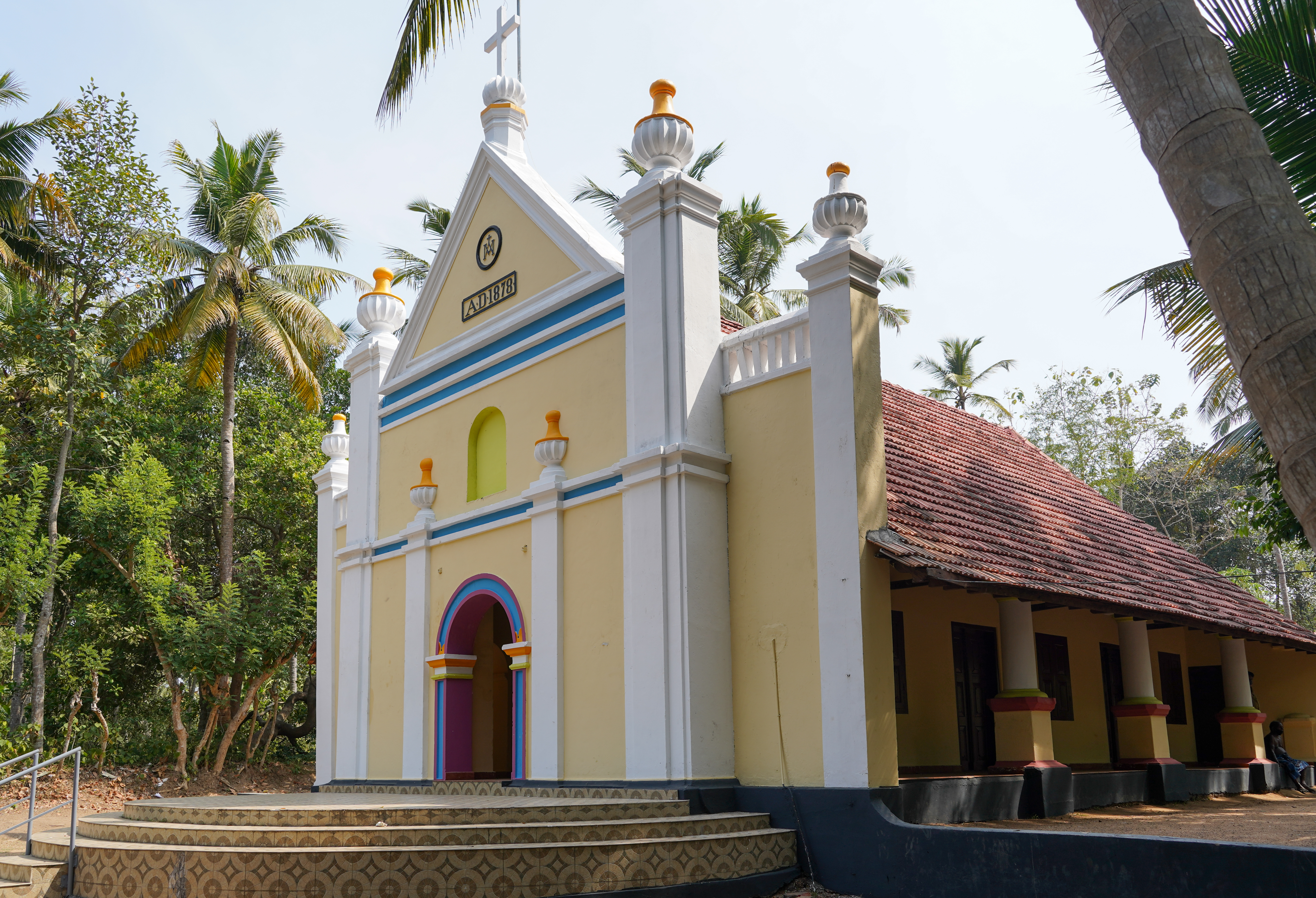
Front and right side

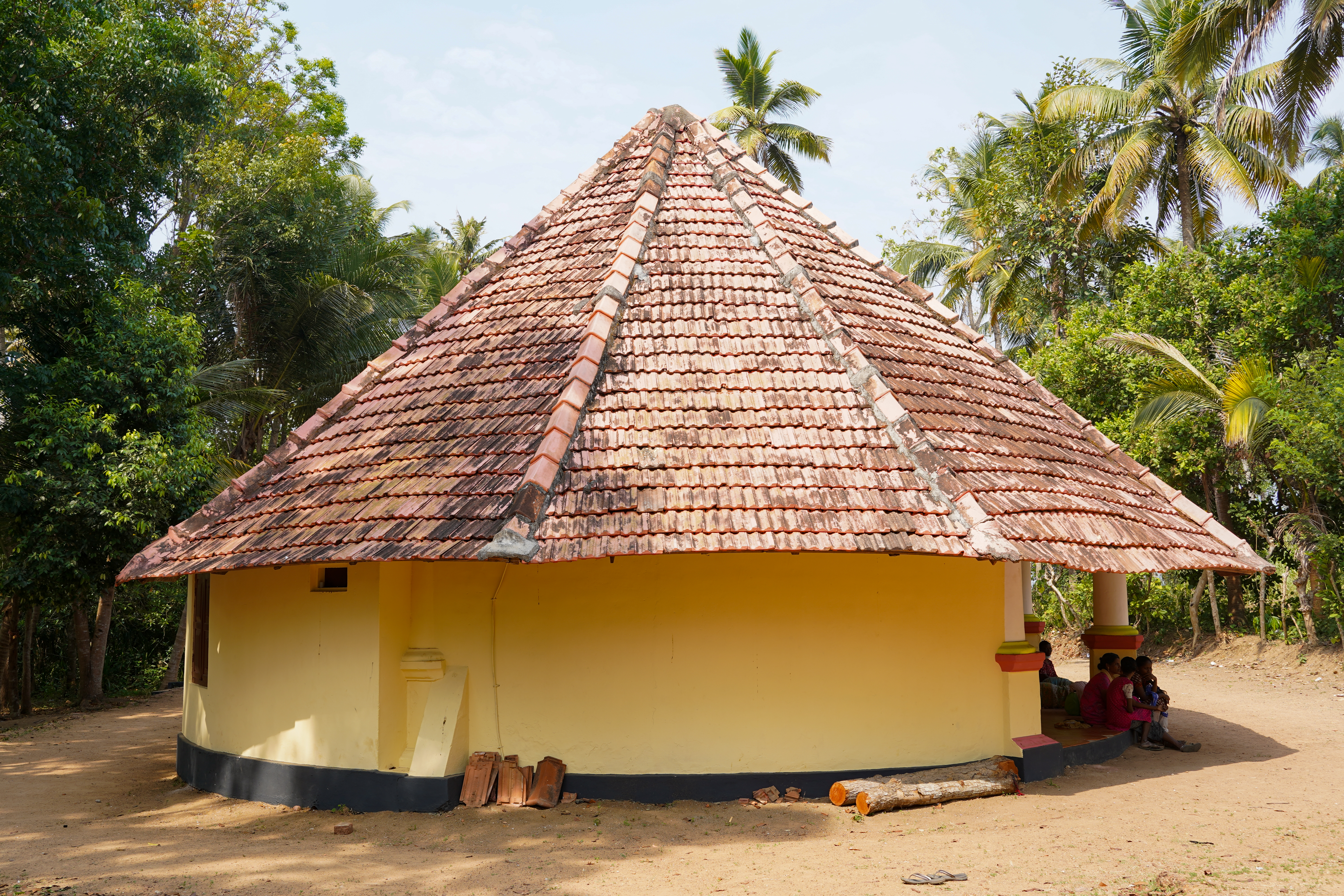
Rear of the church
