= Thevally Palace =

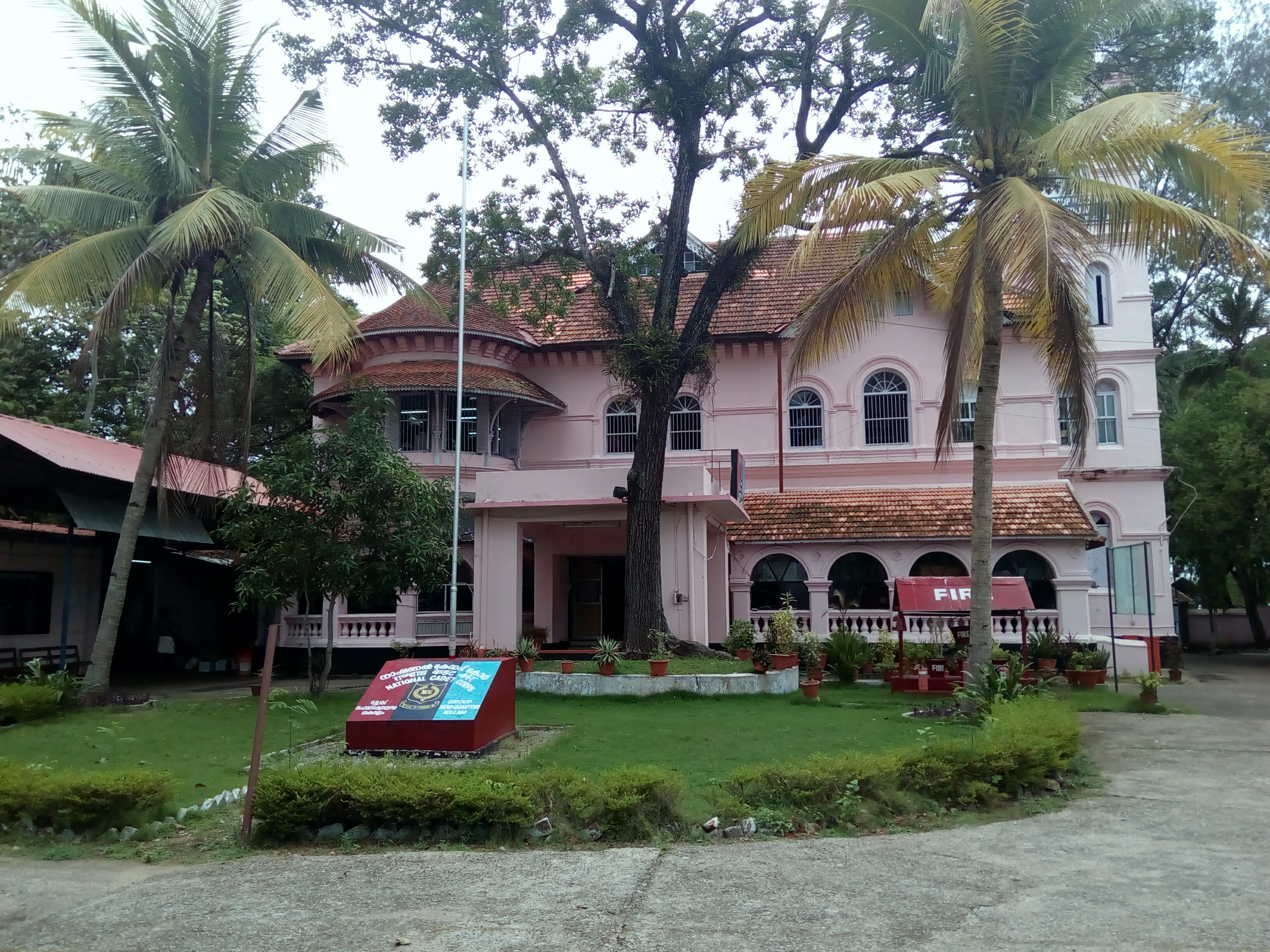
- Thevally Palace
- Interactive map of the Thevally Palace area

General information
- Architectural style: British-Dutch-Portuguese
- Location: Thevally, Kollam city, India
- Coordinates: 8.902911°N 76.579546°E
- Construction started: 1811
- Completed: 1819
- Client: Gowri Parvati Bayi

Thevally Palace or Thevalli Palace is a popular heritage Palace situated at the banks of Ashtamudi lake, in Thevally, Kollam city. It is an important historic monument in the state of Kerala in India. Thevally Palace was built in between 1811 and 1819 the reign of Gowri Parvati Bayi. It is considered as a Hallmark of Kollam City. Now the palace is used as the NCC Group Headquarters of Kollam district. The palace and its premises are now owned by PWD

== History ==
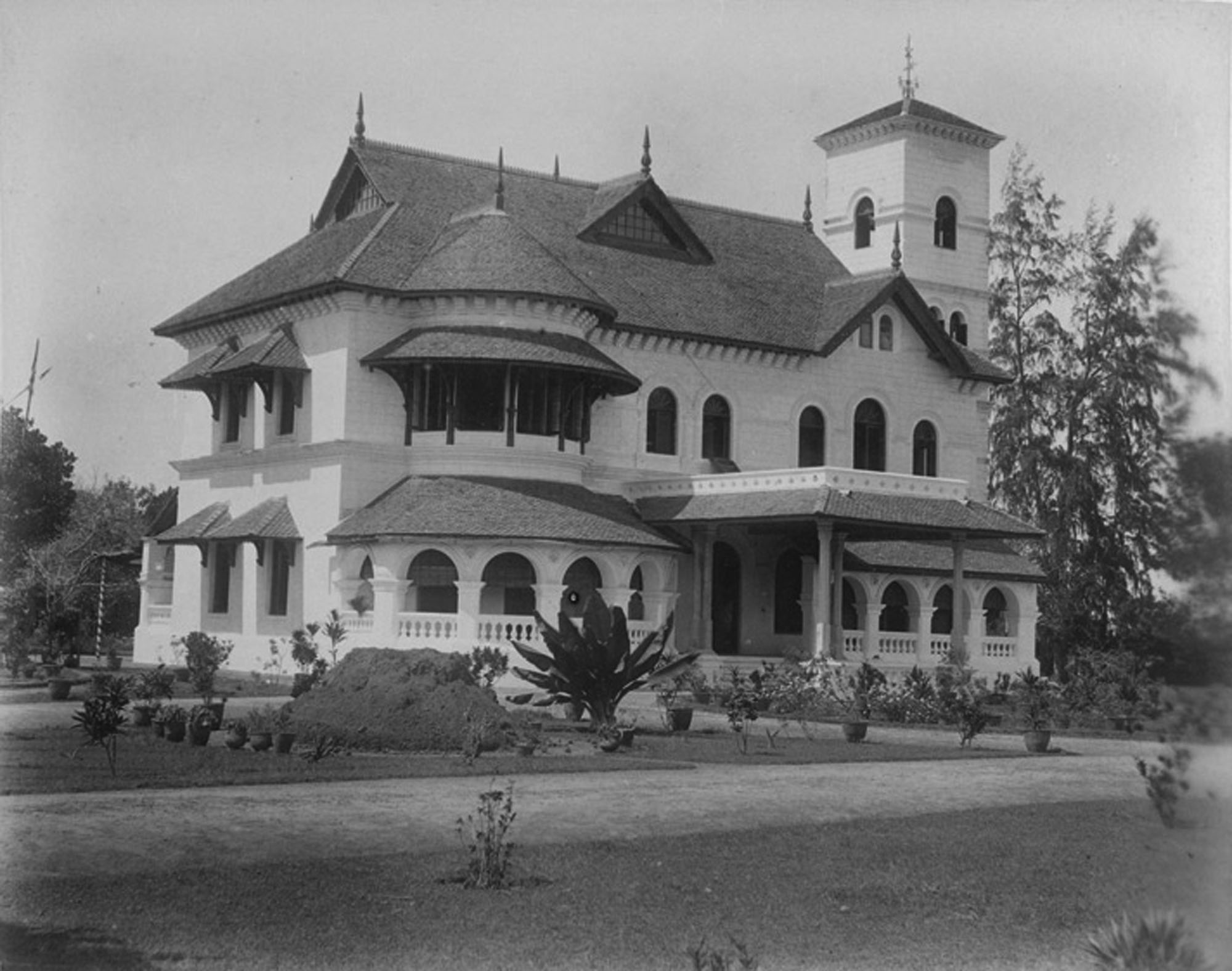
Thevally Palace circa 1900

Thevally Palace is a kind of architectural marvel situated at Kollam city. It was built in between 1811 and 1819, during the reign of Gowri Parvati Bayi. The Kings of Travancore had used Thevally Palace during their visits to Kollam in order to meet the British Residents and to discuss with the officials. The architecture of the palace is a mixture of British, Dutch and Portuguese. The palace was once used for the administrative purposes. Kollam was the capital of Travancore kingdom then. The total skeleton of the palace, made of materials like laterite and lime plaster. The main attraction of the palace is that, it is situated on the banks of Ashtamudi Lake. The palace includes a temple of Lord Sastha.
