= Azhakathu Padmanabha Kurup =

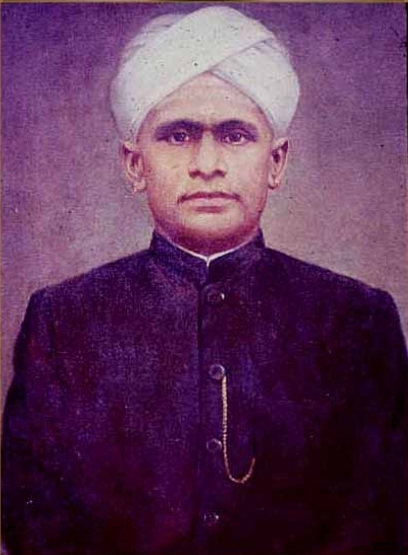
- Born: 15 February 1869; Chavara Thekkumbhagom, Quilon, Travancore (present-day Kollam, Kerala)
- Died: 6 November 1931 (aged 62)
- Citizenship: Indian
- Notable work: Ramachandravilasam, Gandharvavijayam, Prabhushakti
- Spouse: Bhaageeradhi Kunjamma
- Parent(s): Kochukunju Kunjamma, Narayanan Embraadhiri

Azhakathu Padmanabha Kurup (15 February 1869 – 6 November 1931), was a renowned scholar in Sanskrit and Malayalam, who composed the first Malayalam epic poem Ramachandravilasam.

== Biography ==
He was matrilineally born in Azhakathu family as the son of Narayanan Embraadhiri and Kochukunju Kunjamma and was named as Azhakathu Palliyaadi Eashwaren Padmanabhan.

He was also trained in Hindi language from his father. Azhakathu Padmanabhan Kurup became great devotee of Rama after reading Ramacharitamanasa of Tulasidas . His devotion influenced him to compose the epic Ramachandravilasam.

Ramachandravilasam is the first epic in Malayalam that strictly adheres to all the rules of composition, which has 21 sargas, 1832 slokas and 'chitrasargam'. The theme of the poem is based on Ramayana, except the part called 'utharakandam', which has been omitted in the epic poetry.

Ramachandravilasam became a milestone in Malayalam literature, especially in Mahakavya, for this author has made a maiden attempt. Till then Mahakavya were written in Sanskrit on the belief that Malayalam doesn't have the essence for epic composition. Azhakathu started this work in 1894 but took few years to complete it.

During the composition, in order to understand the opinion of readers on an entirely new piece of work, he published his initial draft of Ramachandravilasam, which had 8 sargas, anonymously on a famous newspaper 'Malayalee' of that time. Disappointingly, he didn't receive any response from the readers. So Azhakathu send a letter to Kerala Varma Valiya Koil Thampuran seeking his opinion and also informed that Ramachandravilasam that was published on the newspaper is composed by him. Kerala Varma Valiya Koil Thampuran responded by appreciating his work and also encouraged Azhakathu to complete his remaining work as it would be a turning point in Malayalam literature.

In 1905, Azhakathu completed the composition of Ramchandravilasam and published it on 'Malayalee' newspaper. He then approached his well-wisher A. R. Raja Raja Varma to review his work and provide suggestions. After including the suggestions from A. R. Raja Raja Varma, the final draft of Ramachandravilasam was published in 'Avatharika' in 1907.

Ramachandravilasam has all the features of a neo-classical epic. In the preface to the poem, the poet has declared Bhojachambu as his model. He has also stated that the ideas of many Sanskrit scholars have been adapted by him. Nevertheless, Ramchandravilasam has its own place in the history of Malayalam literature.

Azhakathu Padmanabha Kurup has also made notable contributions in Aattakatha, drama, Kilippattu, Khandakavyam and Balasahityam. Some of his best known works were 'Gandharvavijayam' (Aattakatha), 'Meenakethana Charitham' (Drama), 'Prabhushakthi' (Khandakavyam), kuvalayaasweeyam' (Kilippattu). He has also made translations of Sanskrit classics into Malayalam. In 1894 Azhakathu married 'Pallickal Puthiyaveethil Bhaageeradhi Kunjamma' and the couple had 8 children. He was a Sanskrit teacher in Chavara Govt. High School, Kollam and later retired as 'Munshi' from service.

Even though his work was notable in Malayalam literature unfortunately there aren't much details recorded in history about the life of this poet.
