= The Leela Ashtamudi =

5 Star hotel in Kollam, Kerala

The Leela Ashtamudi, a Raviz hotel
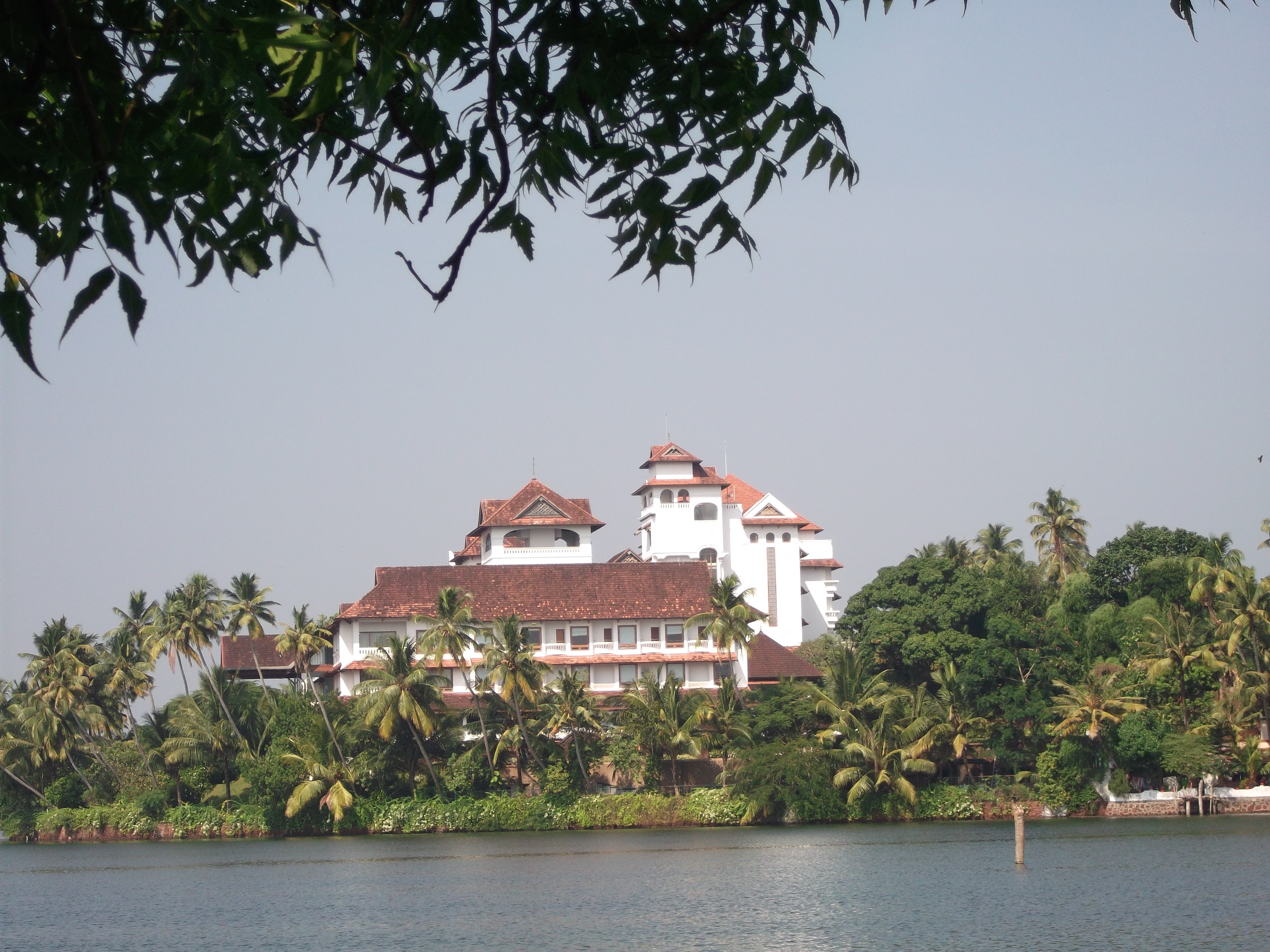
- The Raviz Kollam
- Interactive map of the The Leela Ashtamudi, a Raviz hotel area
- Hotel chain: Raviz Hotels & Resorts

General information
- Location: Kollam, India, Thevally, Mathilil P.O, Kollam, Kerala
- Coordinates: 8.907177°N 76.577858°E
- Opening: 19 August 2011
- Owner: RP Group
- Management: RP Group and Leela Palaces

Technical details
- Floor area: 200,000 sq ft (19,000 m^{2})

Design and construction
- Architect: Eugene Pandala

Other information
- Number of rooms: 90
- Number of suites: 9
- Number of restaurants: 4

Website
- https://www.theleela.com/the-leela-ashtamudi-a-raviz-hotel

The Leela Ashtamudi, also known as The Raviz Kollam and The Raviz Ashtamudi, is a five-star hotel on the banks of the Ashtamudi lake in the city of Kollam, Kerala, India. It was designed by the Indian architect Eugene Pandala. Actors Mohanlal and Shahrukh Khan inaugurated the hotel on 19 August 2011.

== See also ==
- Kollam
- Islands of Kollam
