= Thevally =

Thevally Thevalli
- Neighbourhood
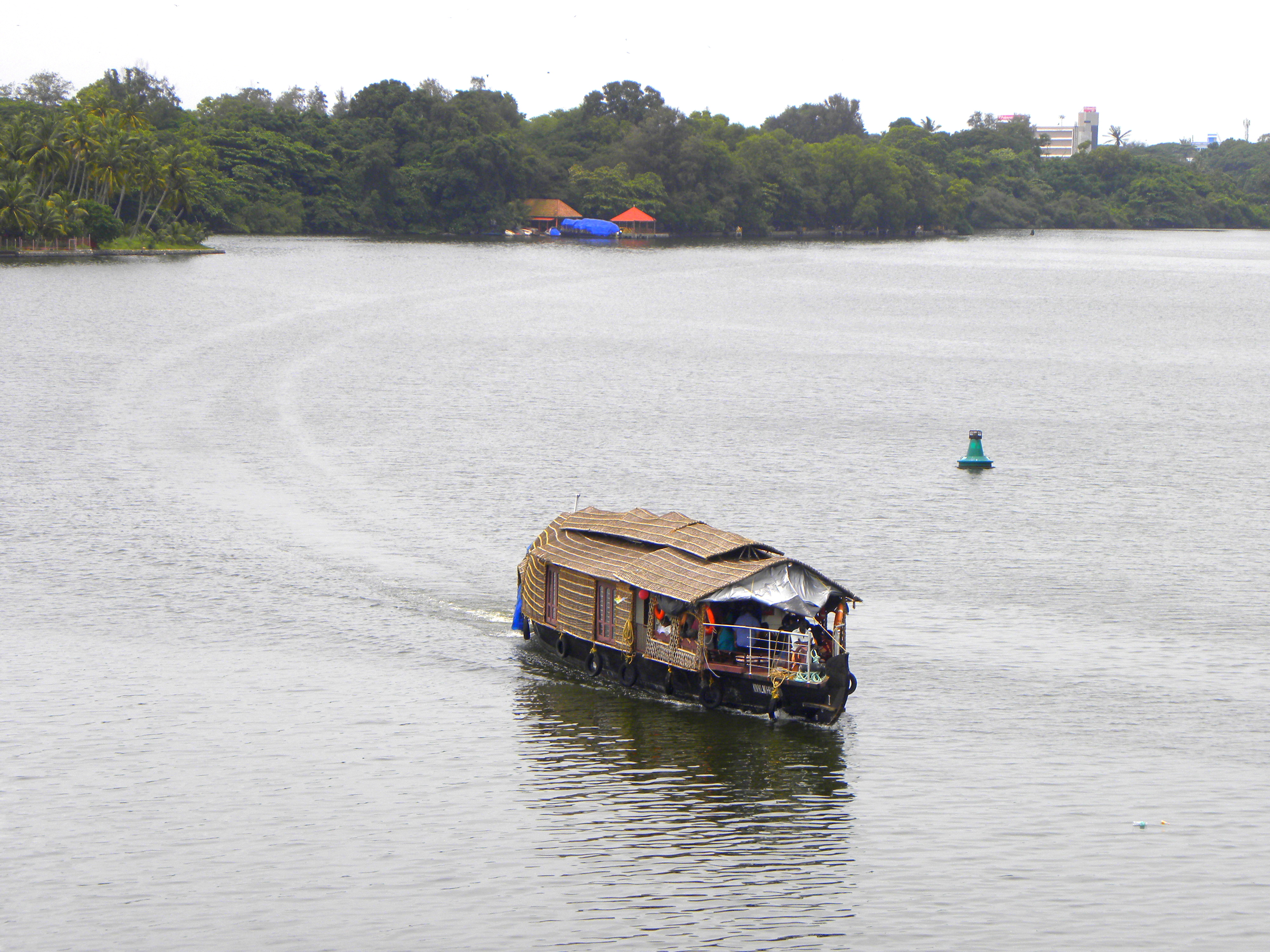
- A House boat floating on Ashtamudi Lake- Scene from Thevally

- Location in Kollam, India
- Coordinates: 8°53′45″N 76°34′40″E
- Country: India
- State: Kerala
- District: Kollam

Government
  - Body: Kollam Municipal Corporation(KMC)

Languages
  - Official: Malayalam, English
- Time zone: UTC+5:30 (IST)
- PIN: 691009
- Vehicle registration: KL-02
- Lok Sabha constituency: Kollam
- Civic agency: Kollam Municipal Corporation
- Avg. summer temperature: 34 °C (93 °F)
- Avg. winter temperature: 22 °C (72 °F)
- Website: http://www.kollam.nic.in

Thevally is located in the city of Kollam, in the state of Kerala, India. Ashtamudi Lake is situated in the vicinity. National Highway-183 (formerly NH 220) passes through the neighbourhood.

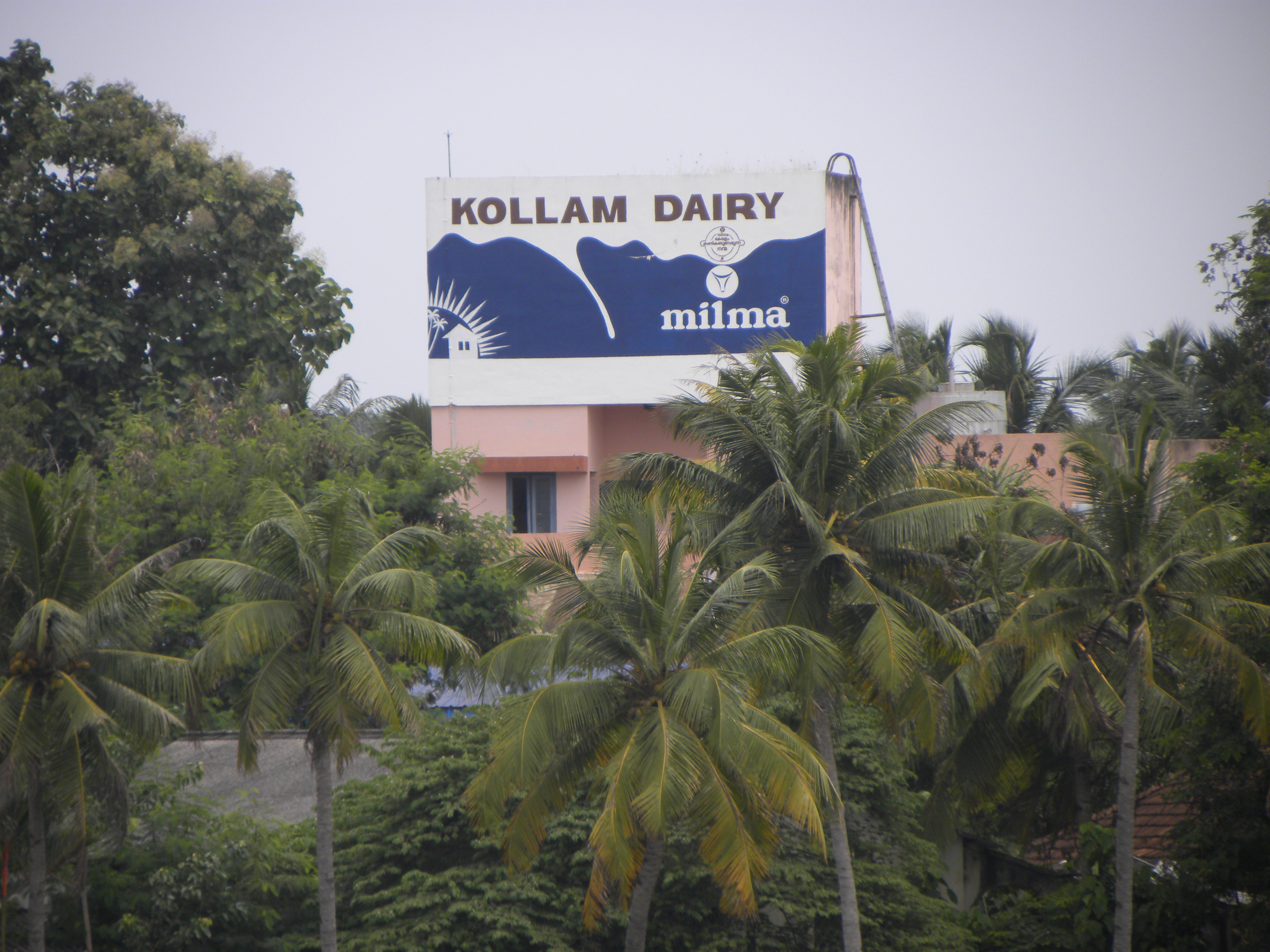
Milma Dairy in Thevally

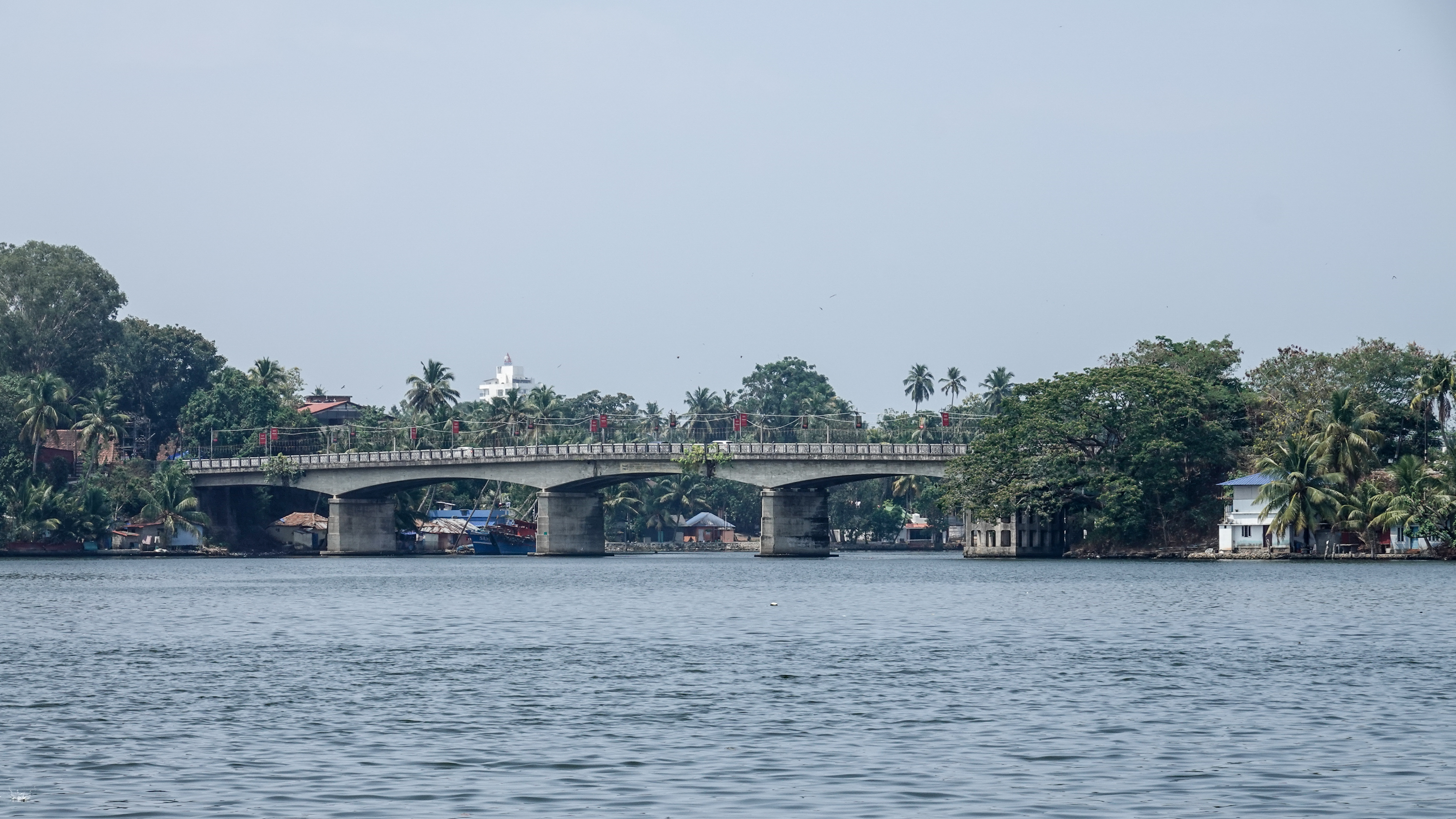
Thevally Bridge from Mathilil across the Ashtamudi Lake

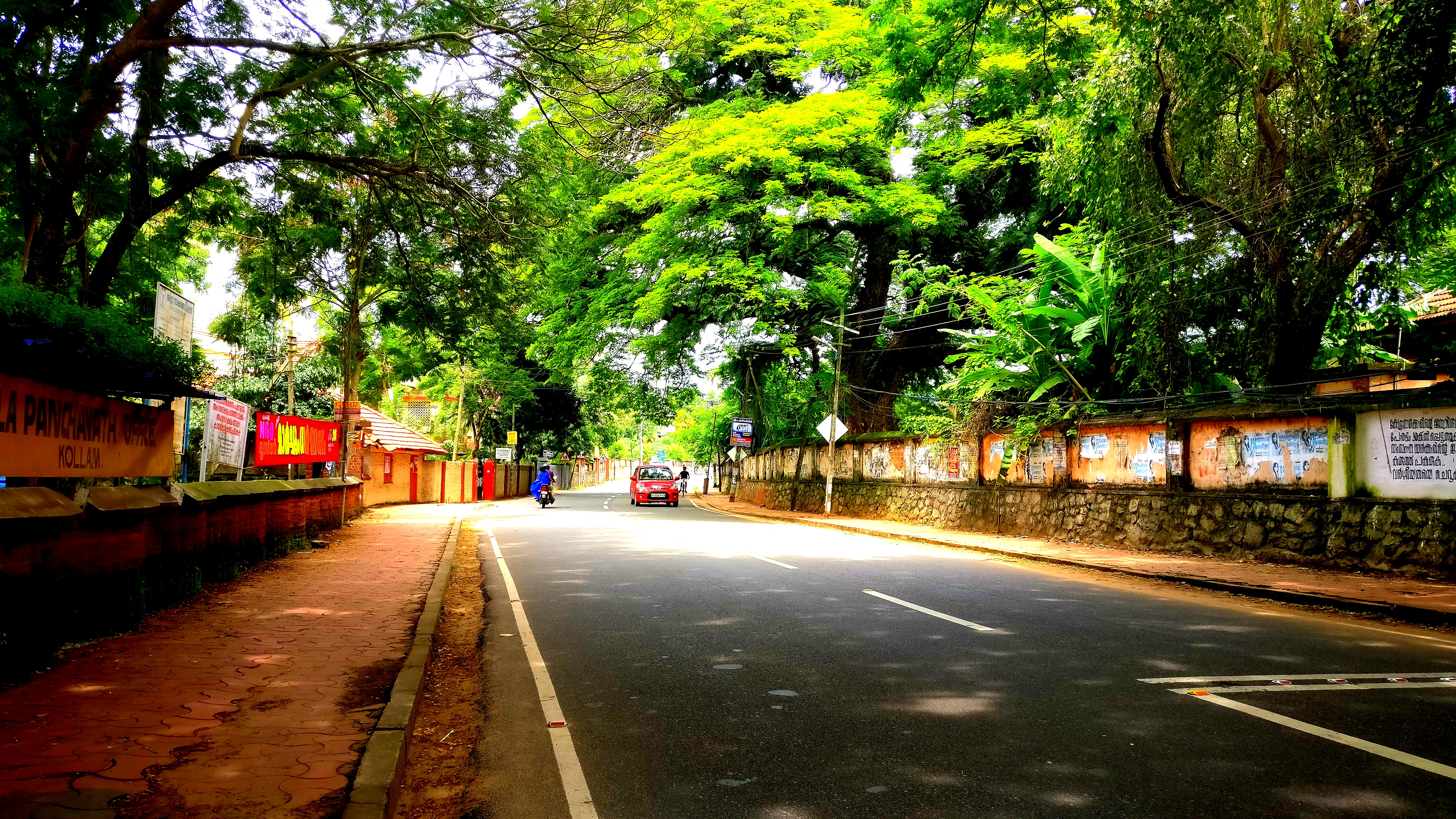
NH-183 near Thevally Palace

== History ==
Thereesapalli (Thevally) sasanam, the first available documented history of Kerala dated AD 849-50, a copper plate with inscription gave tax free benefits to the Christian settlers of Manigramam in Thevally, by the then rulers of Venad.

Thevally had an ancient fort area, at present day Kottayathukadavu area. This area was one strategically located area. It was so because till the roadways developed and places became more accessible by road waterway was major mode of transport of goods, people, army etc. The major waterway Thiruvananthapuram–Shoranur canal that connects Vallakkadavu in Travancore with Alappuzha, Kottayam and other northern parts of Travancore was through a narrow stretch in this part. On olden times Kottayathukadavu was connected to Thevally by a pedestrian wooden bridge. In modern times Kottayathukadavu, was a prominent local boat jetty with a connecting ferry to Thevally. It was so till the Thevally Bridge was built in 1966.

The historic fort in the area had a palace build with laterite and roofed with tile (The traces of Archaeological remains of these structures and remains were available till around 1960's) these were occupied by Venad rulers at those times.

During the time of Colonel John Munro the resident of British India in Travancore, a palace for the king was built in Thevally, and a residency build for the British resident in Ashramam. The Thevally Palace is today used by National Cadet Corps (India).

== Significance of the Place ==
- The dairy plant of Milma in Kollam District is situated at Thevally. The Dairy was commissioned in 1986 with a capacity to handle 60,000 litres per day and subsequently expanded to handle 1.5 lakh litres per day with 169 societies under it.
- One of the major 5 star hotels in South Kerala, The Raviz Hotel is situated at Kottayathukadavu side of Thevally.
- The district Panchayath headquarters of Kollam is situated at Thevally.
- The Malayalam film actor Late. Jayan was born at Olayil, Thevally.

== Amenities ==
Thevally is a tourist destination within Kollam. Attractions include Thevally Palace, a heritage building of architectural merit that was once the residences of the King of Travancore. The four-star Hotel AllSeason is also situated at Thevally. The National Cadet Corps's Kollam District headquarters is situated in Thevally.

== Nearby institutions ==
- National Cadet Corps
- Milma Kollam Dairy
- Fish Seed Hatchery
- ICD bank coaching centre
- Hotel Raviz
- Hotel All Season
- SPCA Kollam
- The Elephant Squad & Kennel club of Kerala
- District Medical Store
- NGO Quarters
- Wrenchboy Customs

== See also ==
- Downtown Kollam
- Kollam
- Kollam district
- Quilon Aerodrome
