= Kollam Parappu =

Kollam Parappu, widely known as Quilon Bank, is one of the most productive fishing grounds on the south-west coast of India.

The bank has been defined as that part of the sea bed between 08 'N and 09 'N latitude in the depth range of 275–375 meters. It covers an area of 3,300 km^{2} off the coast of Kollam and Alappuzha districts. The region is a fertile fishing ground with rich marine biological diversity, including deep sea prawns, shrimps and lobsters.

The temperature of the Quilon Bank waters is mild (between 21 and 26 degrees Celsius), and the salinity ranges between 34 and 34.6 parts per thousand.

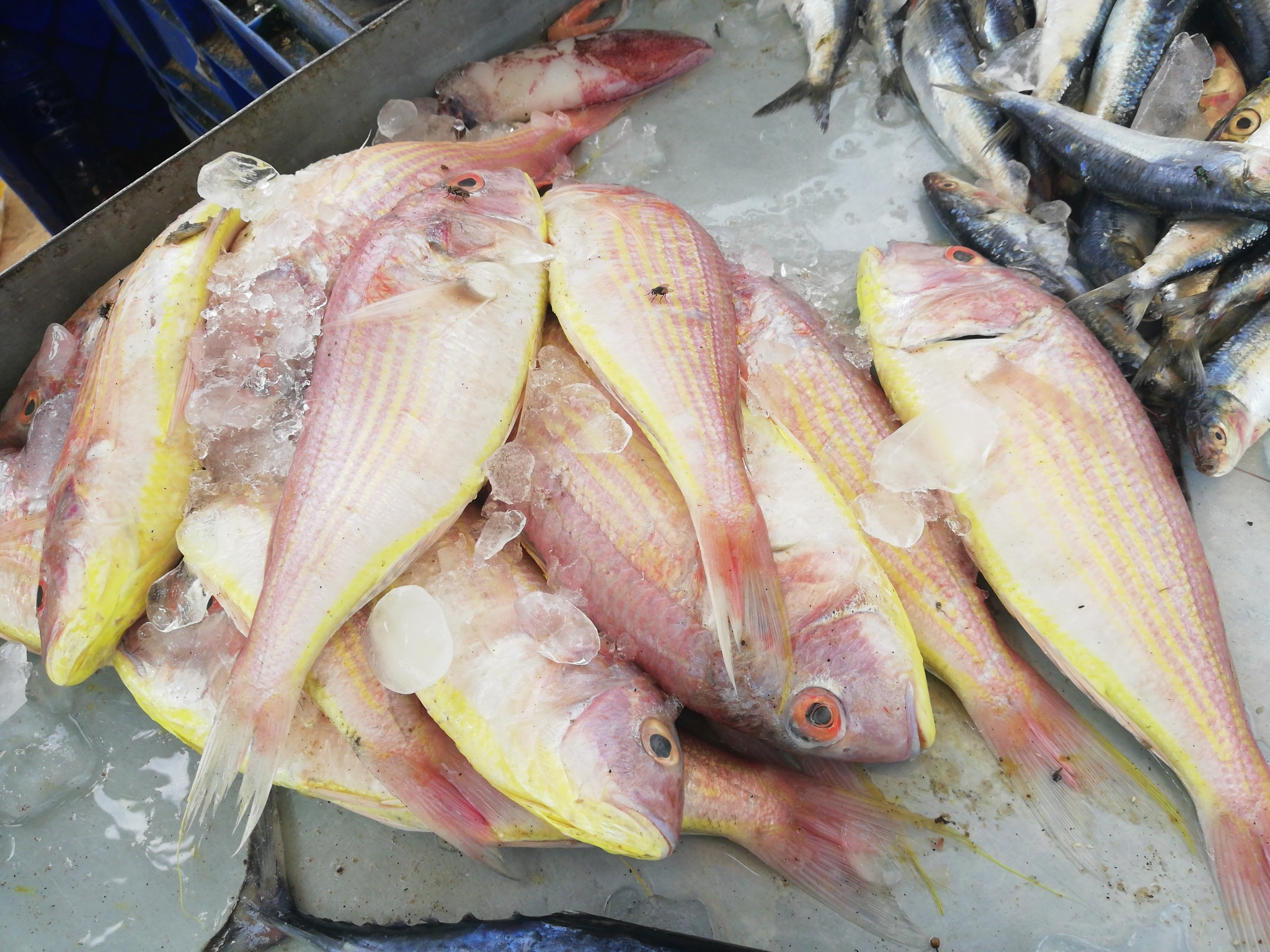
The Threadfin Bream is a commonly found nemipterid in Quilon Bank.

The peak season for this fishing ground is from July to October. The fish fauna of the Quilon Bank has a dominant population of Nemipterids and is also demarcated as the most important ground for pandalid shrimp. The bank attracts many fisheries scientists for conducting scientific research, oceanographic studies, ecological studies, etc.

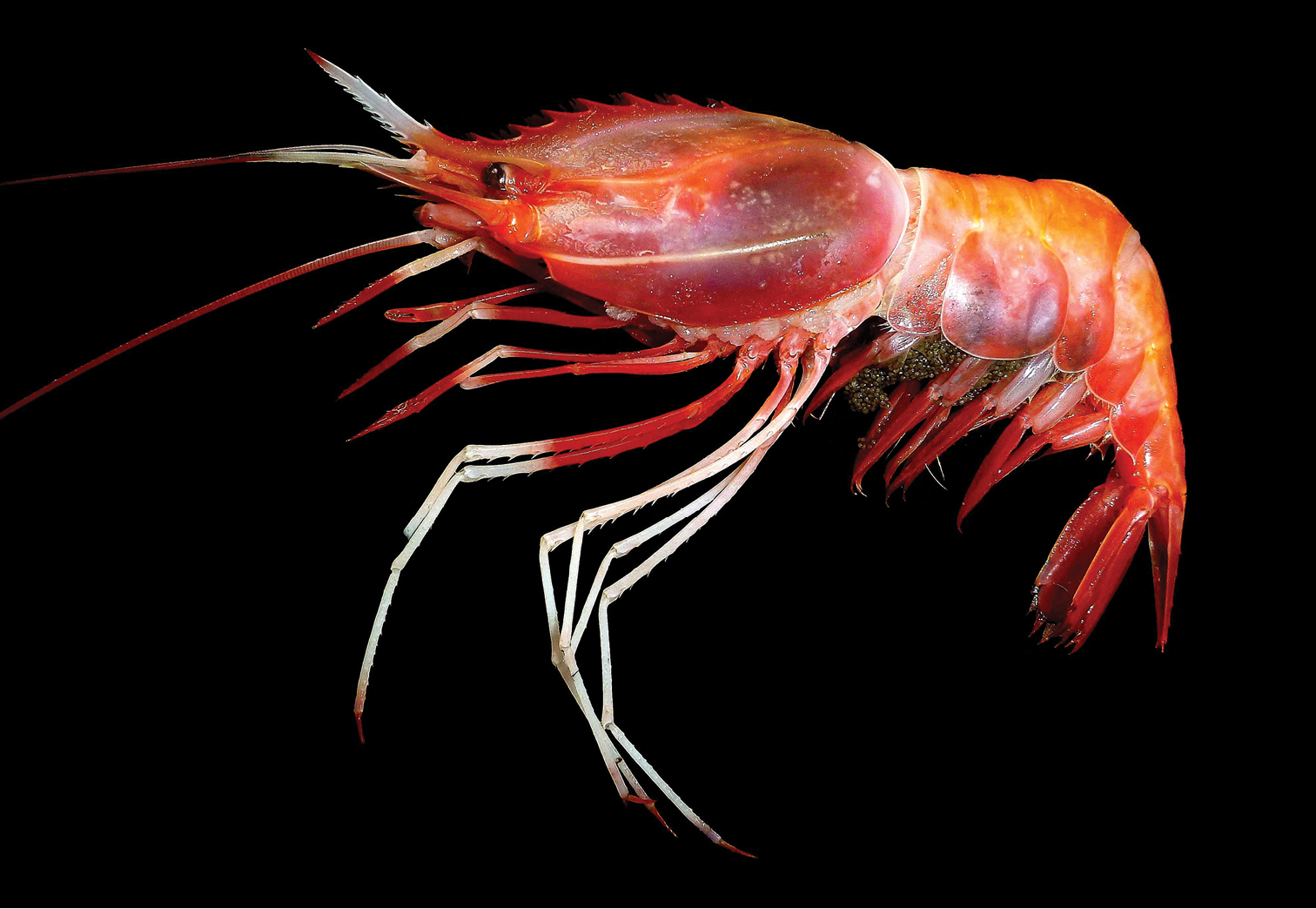
A deep sea shrimp that was caught at the Shakthikulangara fishing harbour in the Quilon bank region.
