= Munroe Island =

Inland island group in Kollam

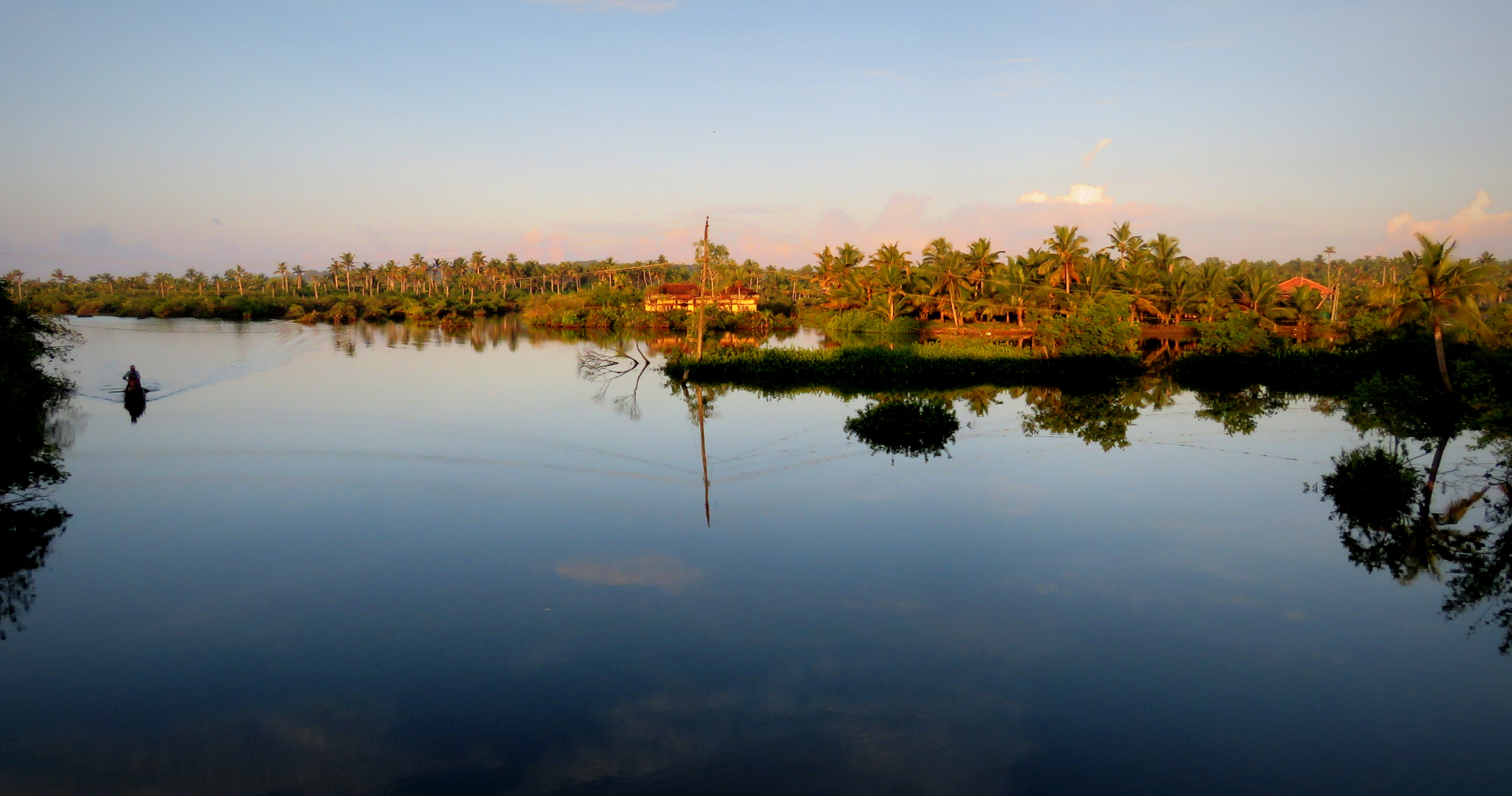
- Lake Ashtamudi at Munroe Island

- Location within Kerala
- Etymology: In honour of Col. John Munro

Geography
- Location: Ashtamudi Lake in India
- Coordinates: 9°0′0″N 76°37′0″E
- Archipelago: Islands of Kollam
- Adjacent to: Lake Ashtamudi
- Total islands: 8
- Major islands: Munroe Island, Perungalam, Pattamthuruth, Pezhumthuruth
- Area: 13.37 km^{2} (5.16 sq mi)

Administration
- India
- Largest Metropolis: Kollam (Quilon) (pop. 397419)

Demographics
- Population: 9054 (2011)
- Pop. density: 776/km^{2} (2010/sq mi)
- Ethnic groups: Malayali

Additional information
- Time zone: IST (UTC+5.30)
- Official website: www.munroeisland.co.in
- The nearest Railway Station is Munroturuttu railway station.

Munroe Island is an inland island group located at the confluence of Ashtamudi Lake and the Kallada River, in Kollam district, Kerala, South India. It is a group of eight small islets comprising a total area of about 13.4 km^{2}. The island, accessible by road, rail and inland water navigation, is about 25 kilometres (16 mi) from Kollam by road, 38 kilometres (24 mi) north from Paravur, 12 kilometres (7.5 mi) west from Kundara and about 25 kilometres (16 mi) from Karunagapally. As of the 2011 Indian census, the administrative village of Mundrothuruth (which includes nearby small villages as well) has a total population of 9054, consisting of 4318 males and 4736 females. This island is also known as "Sinking Island of Kerala".

The place is named in honour of Resident Colonel John Munro of the former Princely State of Travancore. The islands measure 13.4 square kilometres (5.2 sq mi) in area.

== History ==
In 1795 the British established their supremacy in South India and the princely state of Travancore came under their governance. From 1800 onwards, a Resident was appointed by East India Company as administrative head of Travancore. The first Resident was Colonel Colin Macaulay, followed by Colonel John Munro. During his tenure Munro oversaw the land reclamation efforts in the delta where Kallada River joins Ashtamudi Lake and the reclaimed island was named after him as Munroe Island. The Dutch Church here in Munroe Island is one of the ancient churches in Kerala. It was built by the Dutch in 1878. The red brick church is a blend of Dutch-Kerala architecture on the scenic banks of Lake Ashtamudi.

The villagers depended on coconut coir manufacturing as livelihood, however, post Indian Ocean tsunami, things have changed.

== Tourism ==
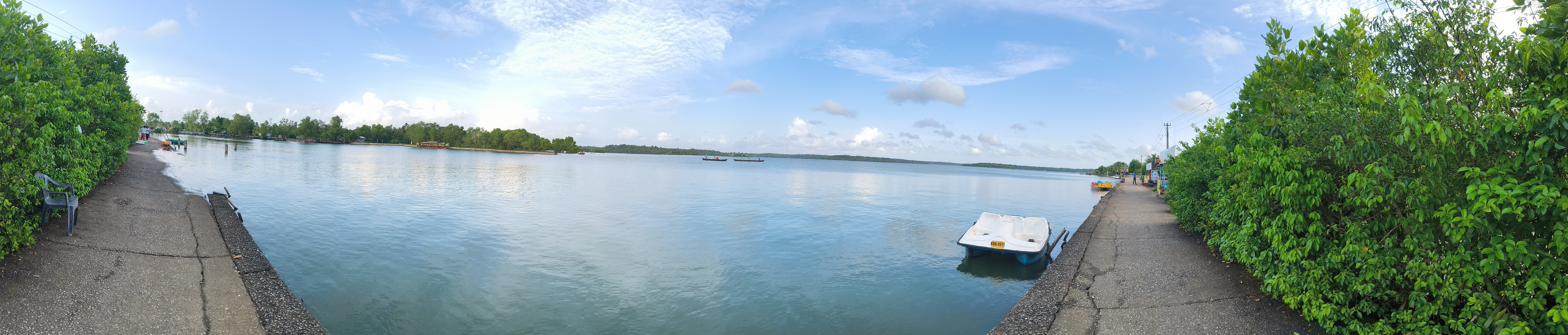
Panoramic view of Mundro Island

The island village is a tourism destination where one can see the coir retting process, coir weaving, fishing, prawns feeding, migratory bird watch, narrow canals and waterways, coconut farms on the lake shore, lagoons, mangrove plants and the tiny islands of Pathupara.

Kallada Boat Race, which is one of the famous boat races in Kerala, is at Karuvathrakadavu- Muthiraparambu nettayam in Munroe Island.

== Threat of submergence ==
Low-lying areas of the Island are reportedly under a threat of submerging in high tides. In 2016, an expert team from the Thangal Kunju Musaliar College of Engineering, Kollam had started a study into the phenomena at the request of the Munroethuruthu grama panchayat. The team headed by Prof. Gouri Antharjanam, Head, Department of Civil Engineering, visited the Island. Subsequently, geo-scientists from the National Centre for Earth Science Studies (NCESS) conducted a two-year study from 2017 to 2019. They used observations from the satellite microwave interferometric technique and from an array of local GPS stations. They tentatively concluded that the Island is not subsiding. They found that only very heavy buildings that do not follow proper design standards have subsided up to 1.5 ft (0.46 m). The double railway line, with up to 150 trains per day, and station platforms are also subsiding. The NCESS scientists found that a tide of 1 m (3.3 ft) at the coast translates to less than 0.5 m (1.6 ft) at Munroe Island. Hence, global warming is also not a key problem. In 2022, a team from Sree Narayana Public School, Vadakkevila, Kollam had conducted a preliminary study on the impact of Kallada Dam on the ecology of Munroe Island. The team conducted a survey among the residents of Munroe island and handed over the report to the District Collector of Kollam district.

The island's population has been steadily declining due to an exodus of people unable to cope with the living conditions. The death of Lance Naik B. Sudheesh of this island in the Border area at Siachen Glacier spurred interest of the outer world in the problems of this place. Villagers fear subsiding of the land, and they suffer due to the lack of transport and other amenities. Land prices have fallen as they migrate elsewhere for better opportunities. The problems may have been exacerbated by the Indian Ocean tsunami in 2004 that changed the backwater system and resulted in increased salinity of the soil.

== Gallery ==
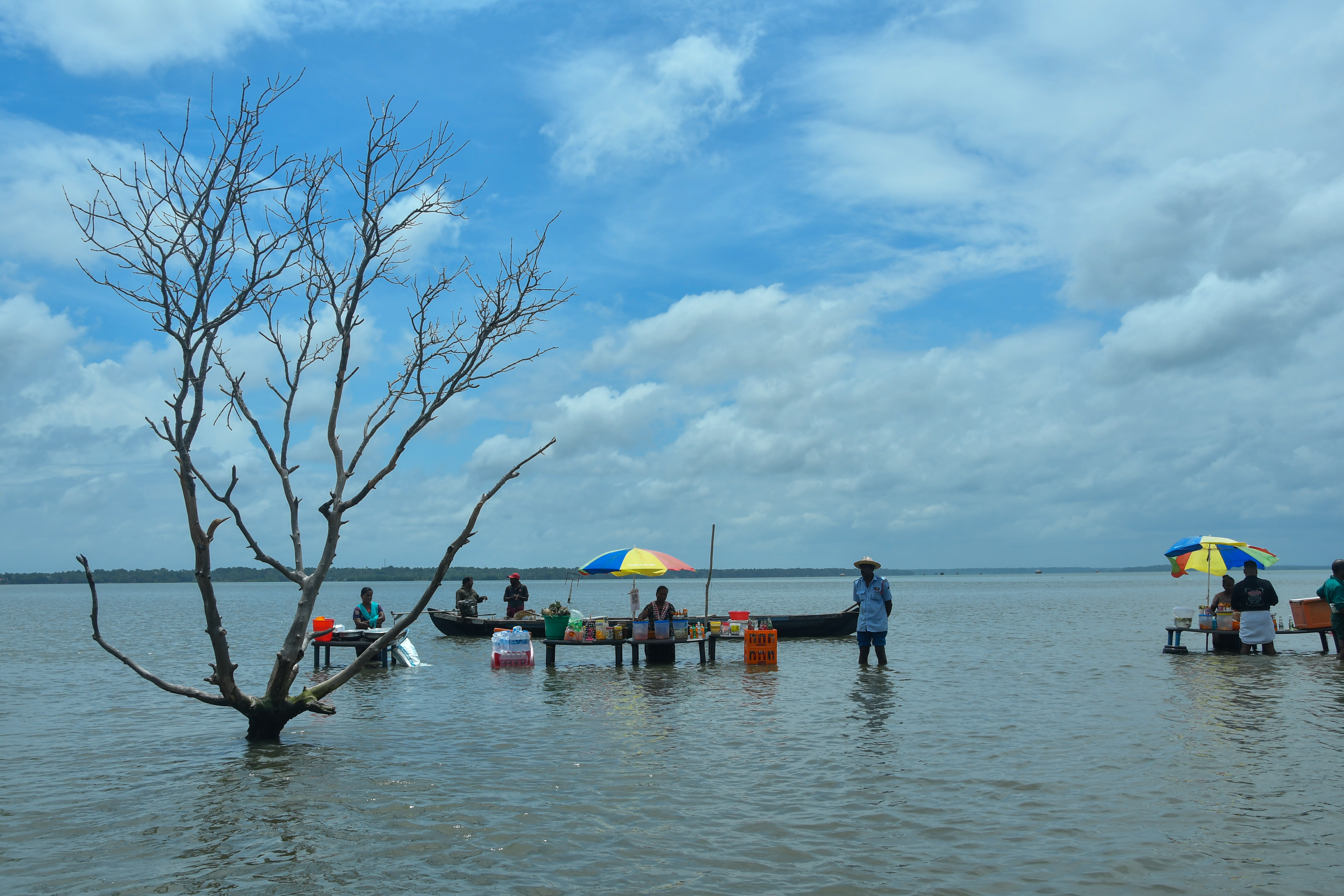
Saambranikkodi of Munroe Island

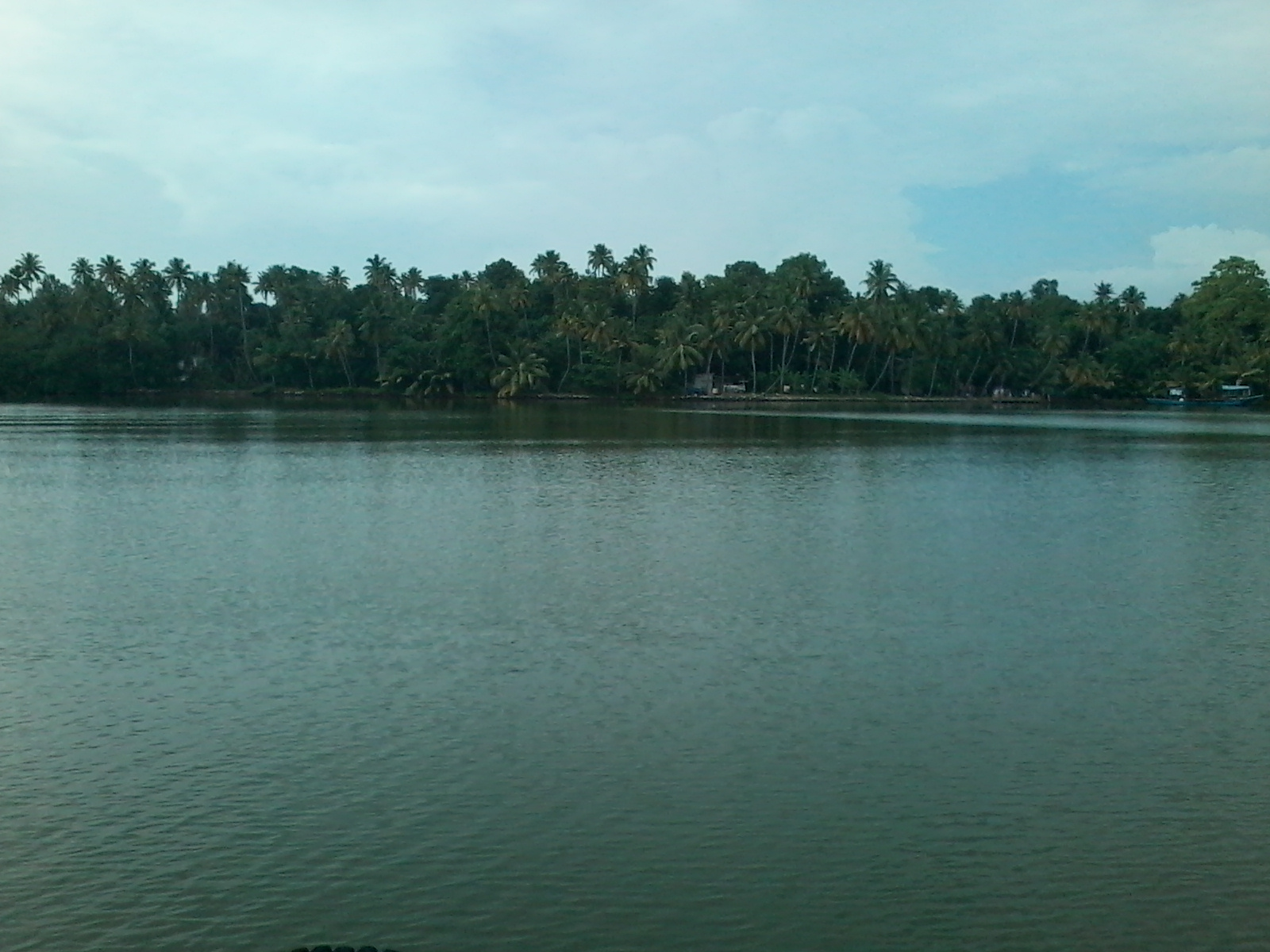
Munroe island in Ashtamudi Lake

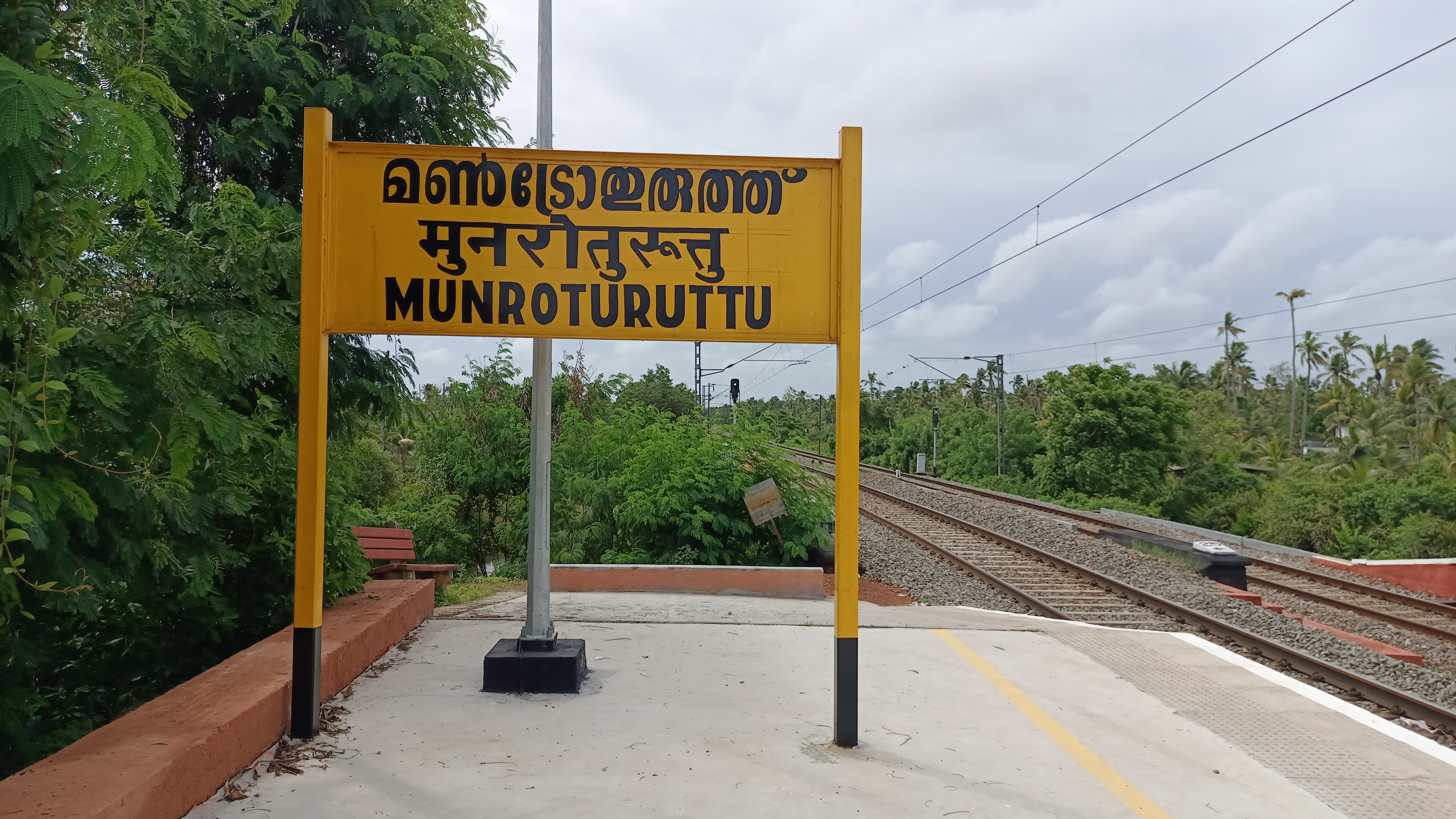
Munroe island railway station

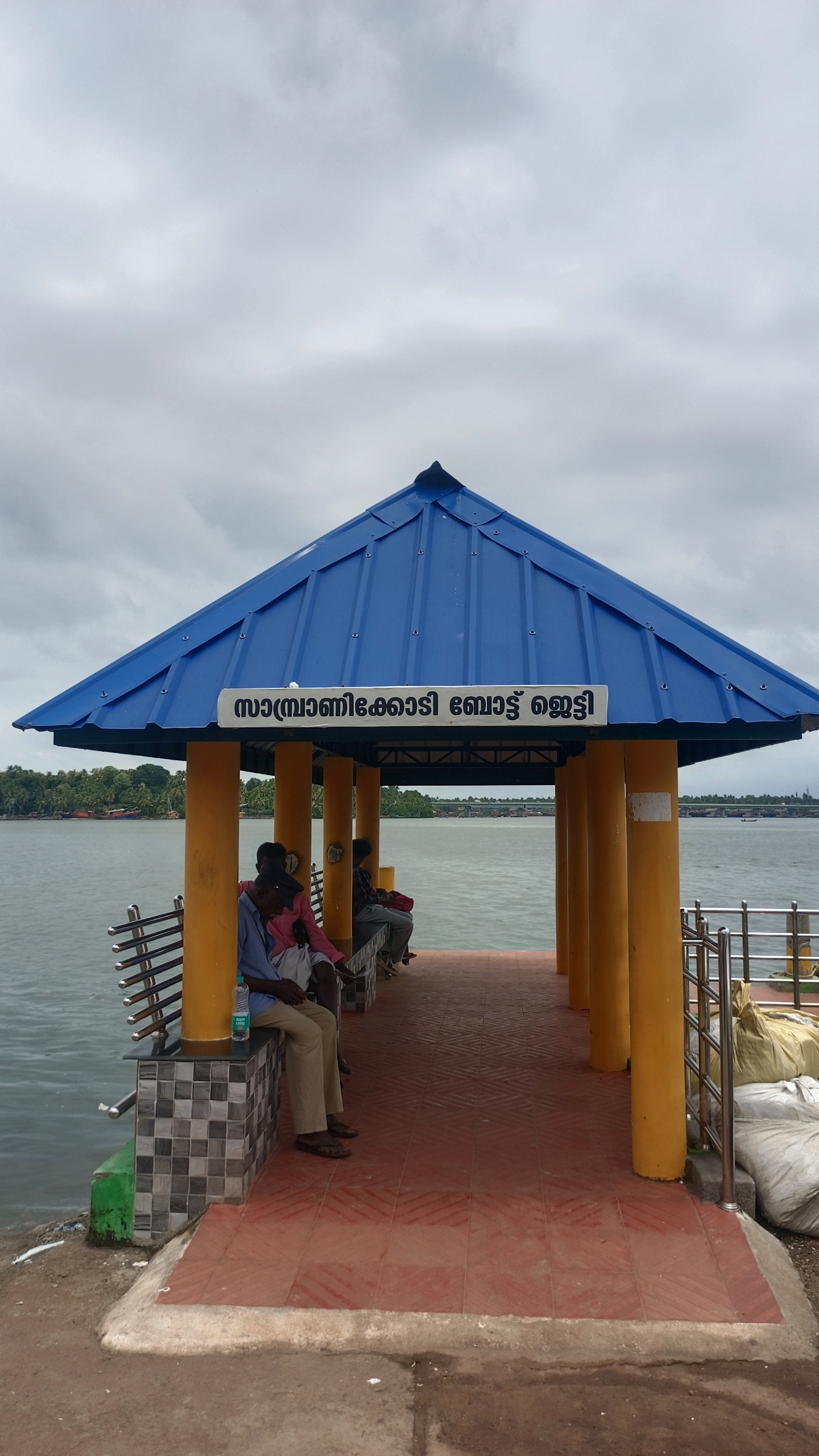
Saambranikkodi boat jetty

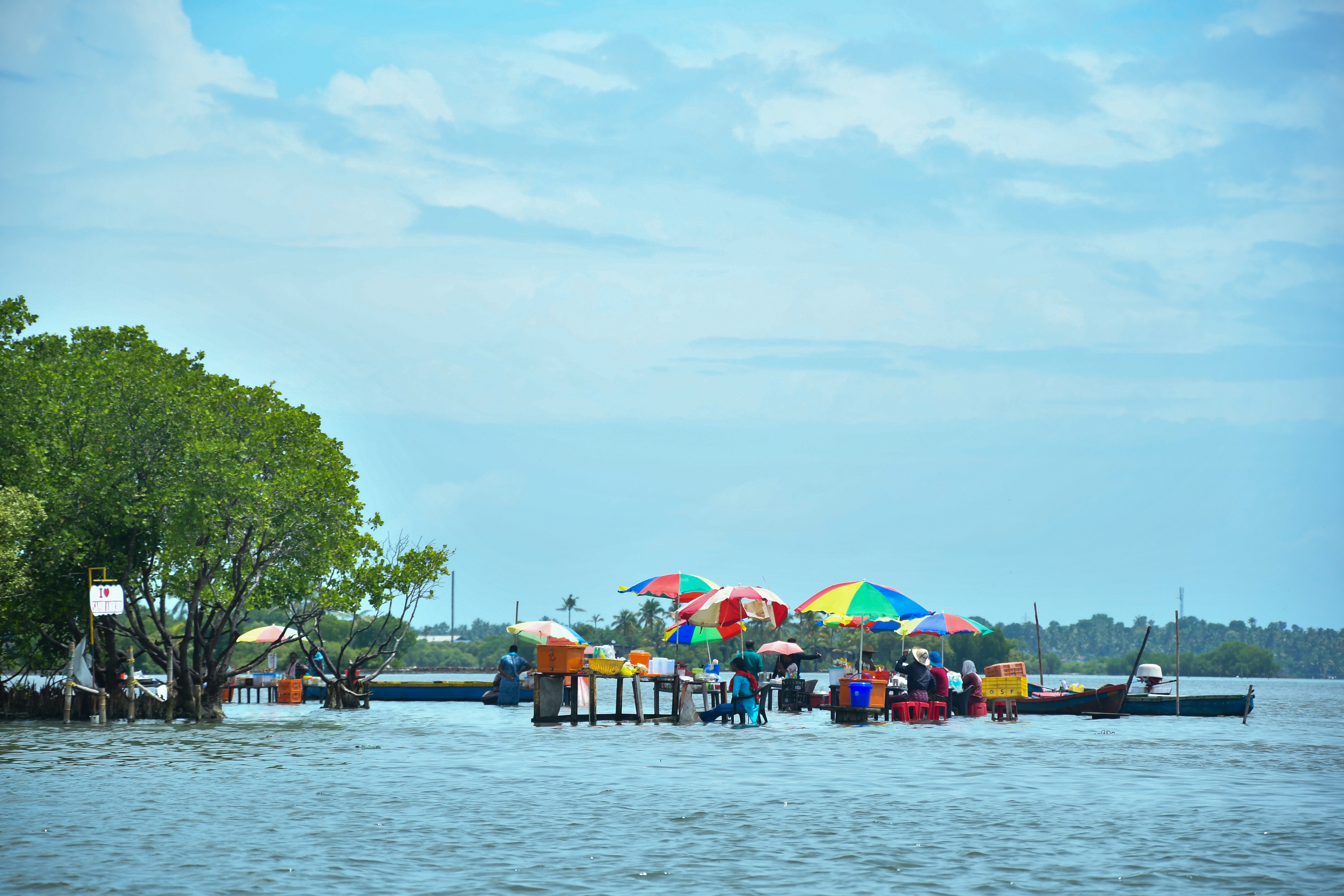
Saambranikkodi at Munroe Island

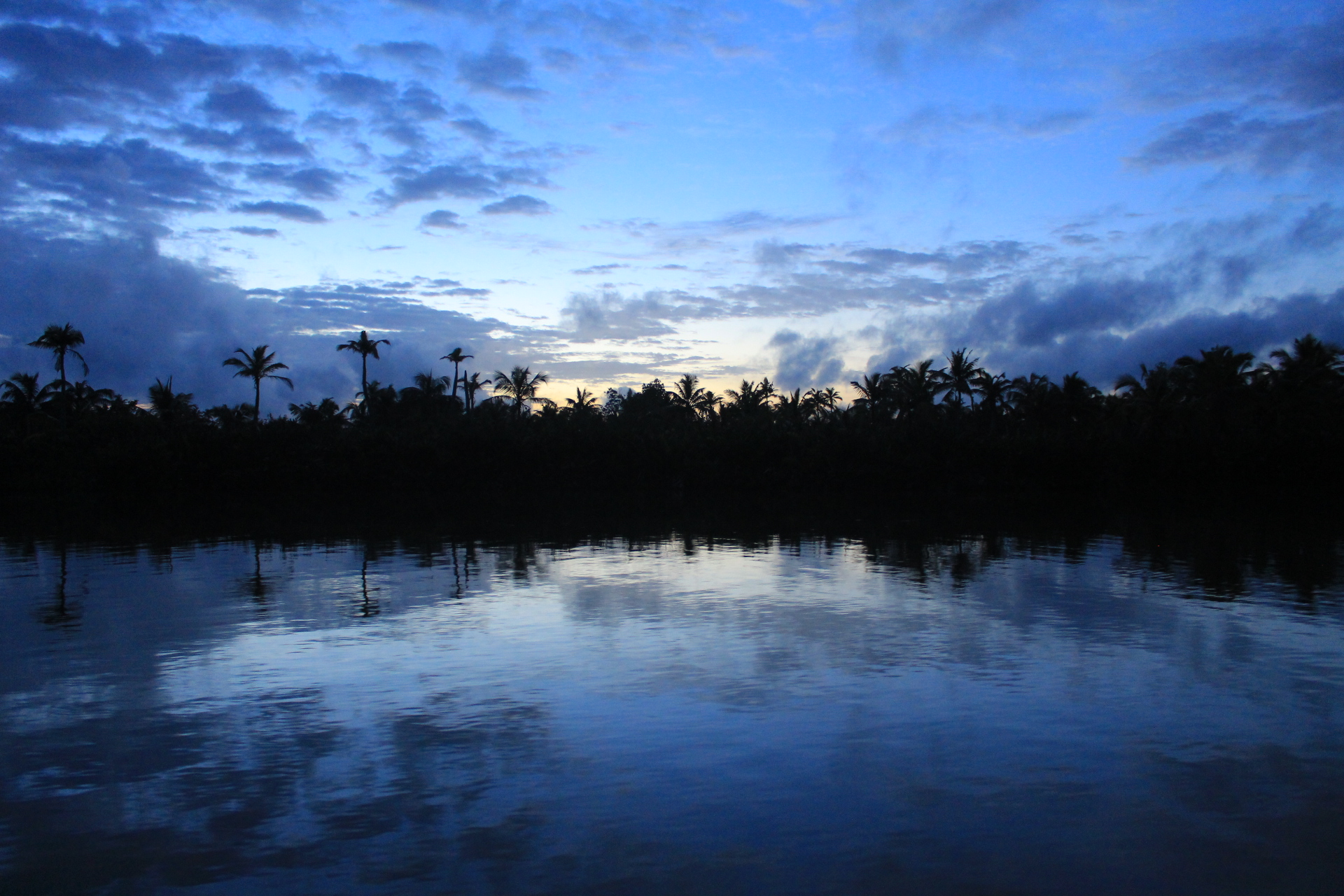

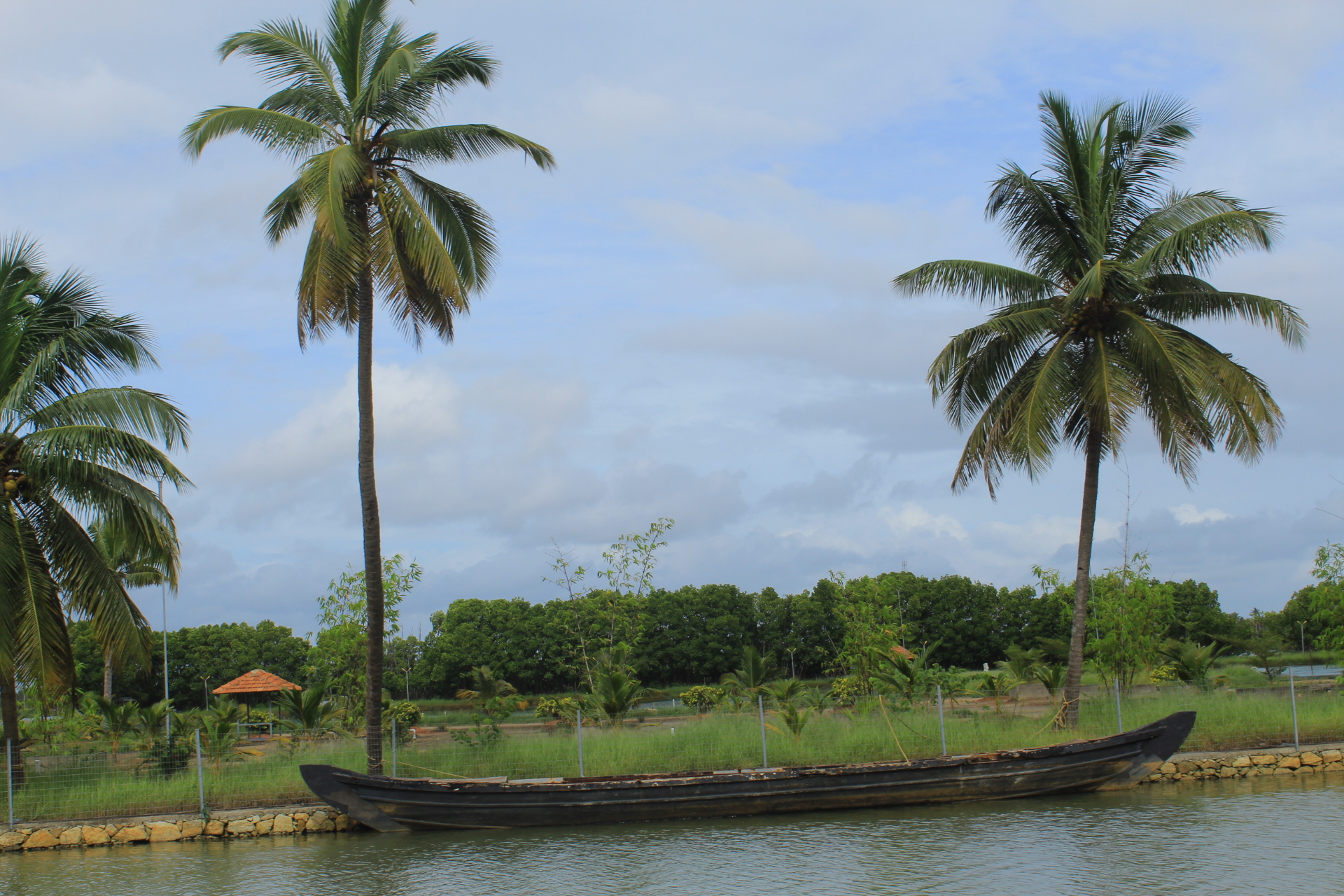

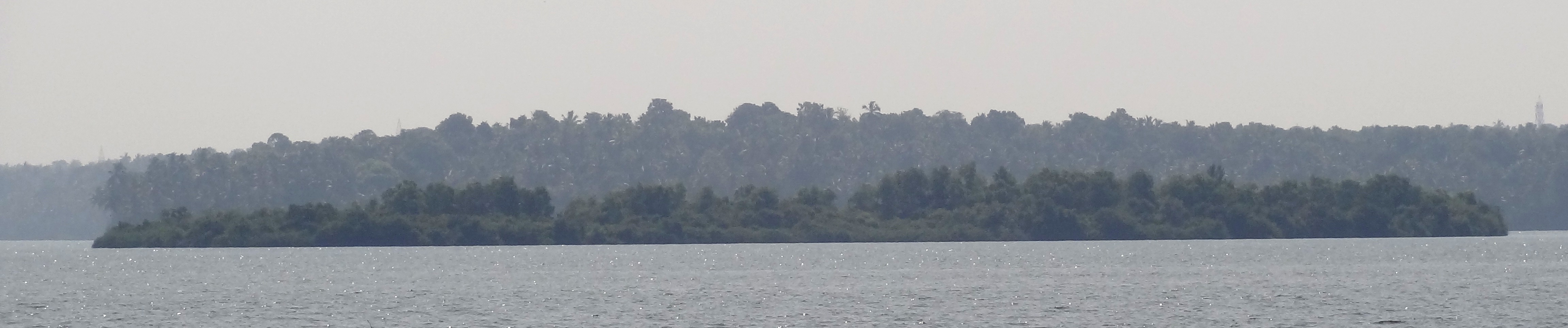
Uninhabited island in Munroe

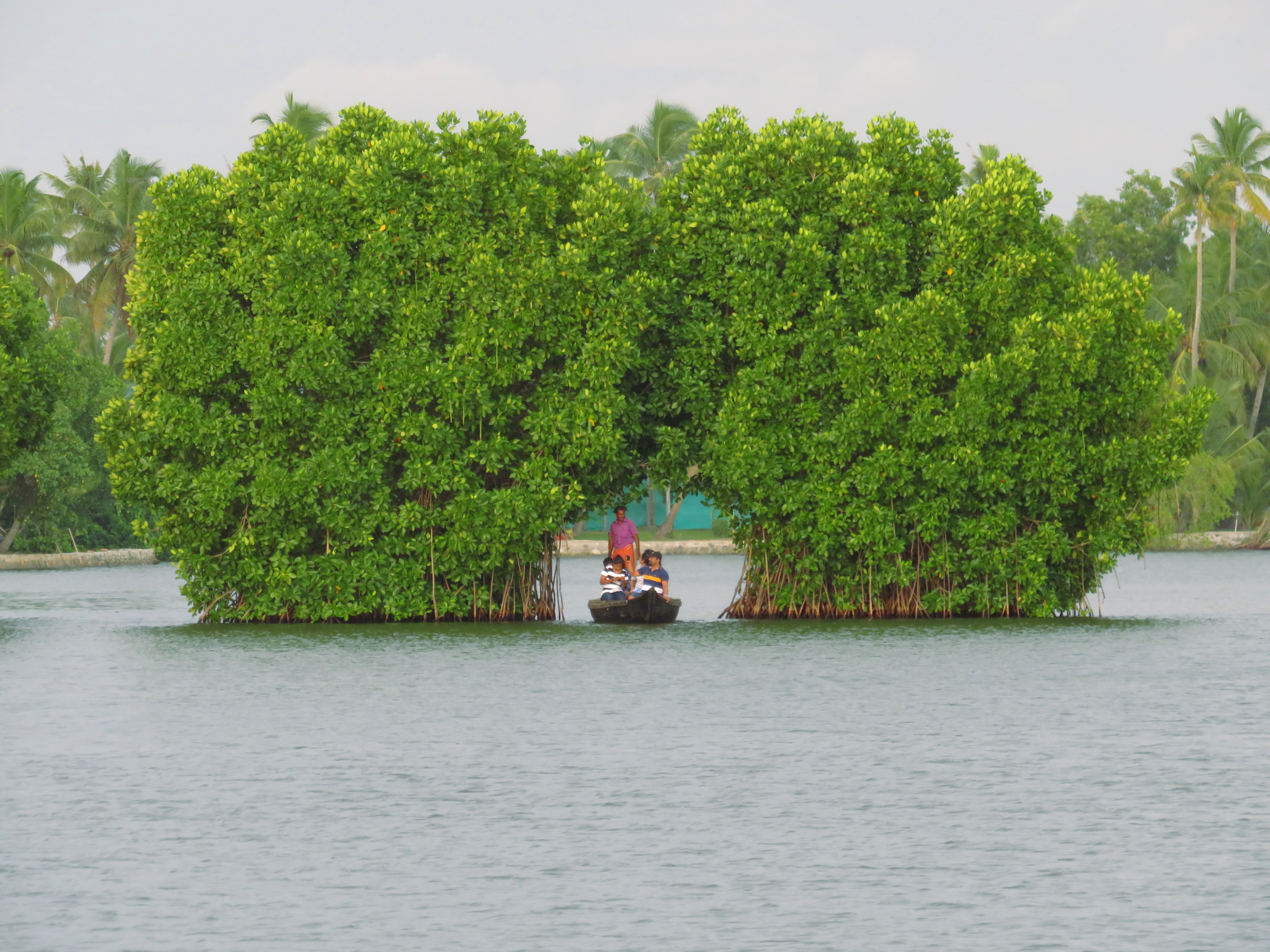
Tourism in Munroe Island

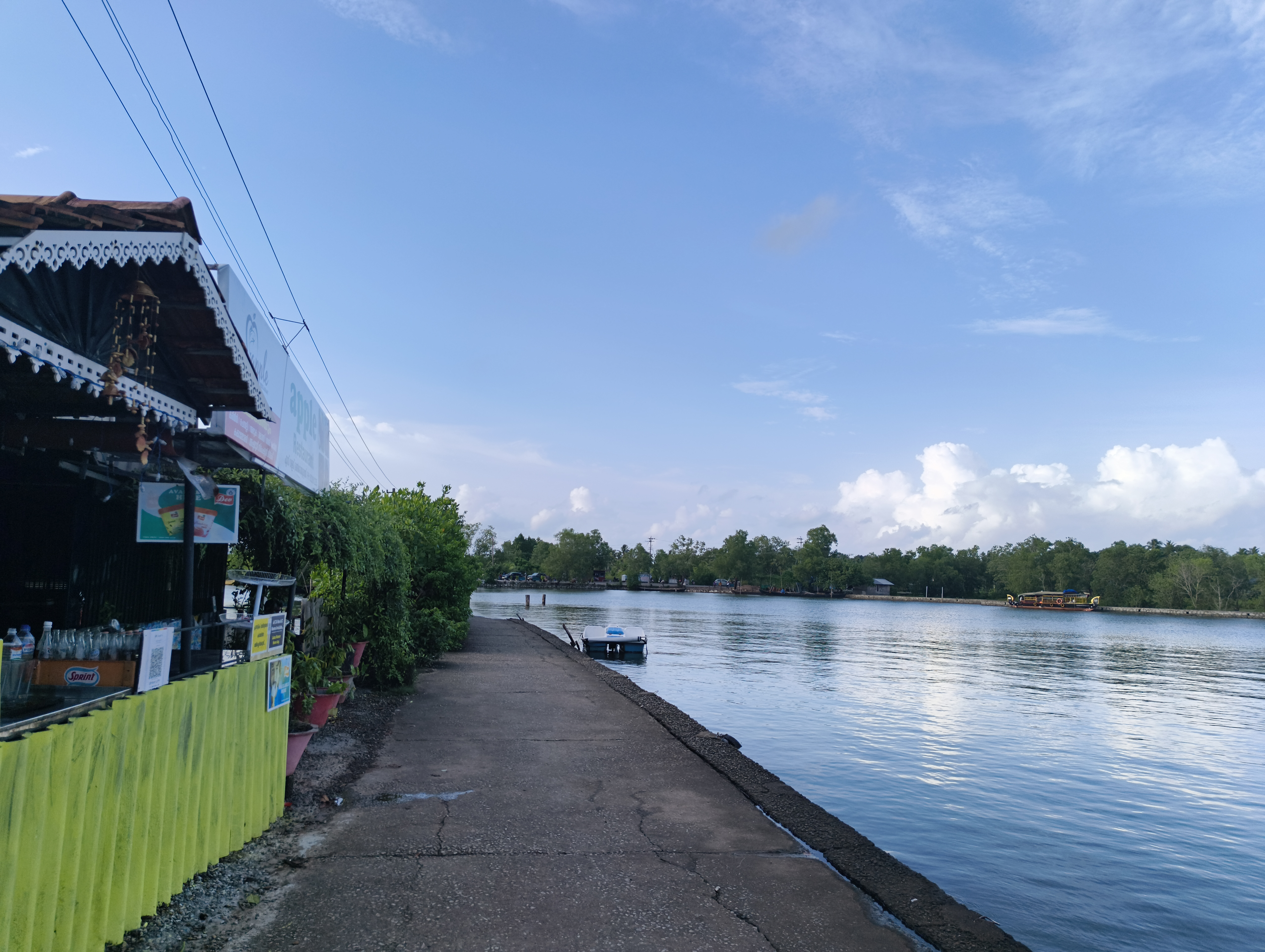
Evening View of Mundro Island

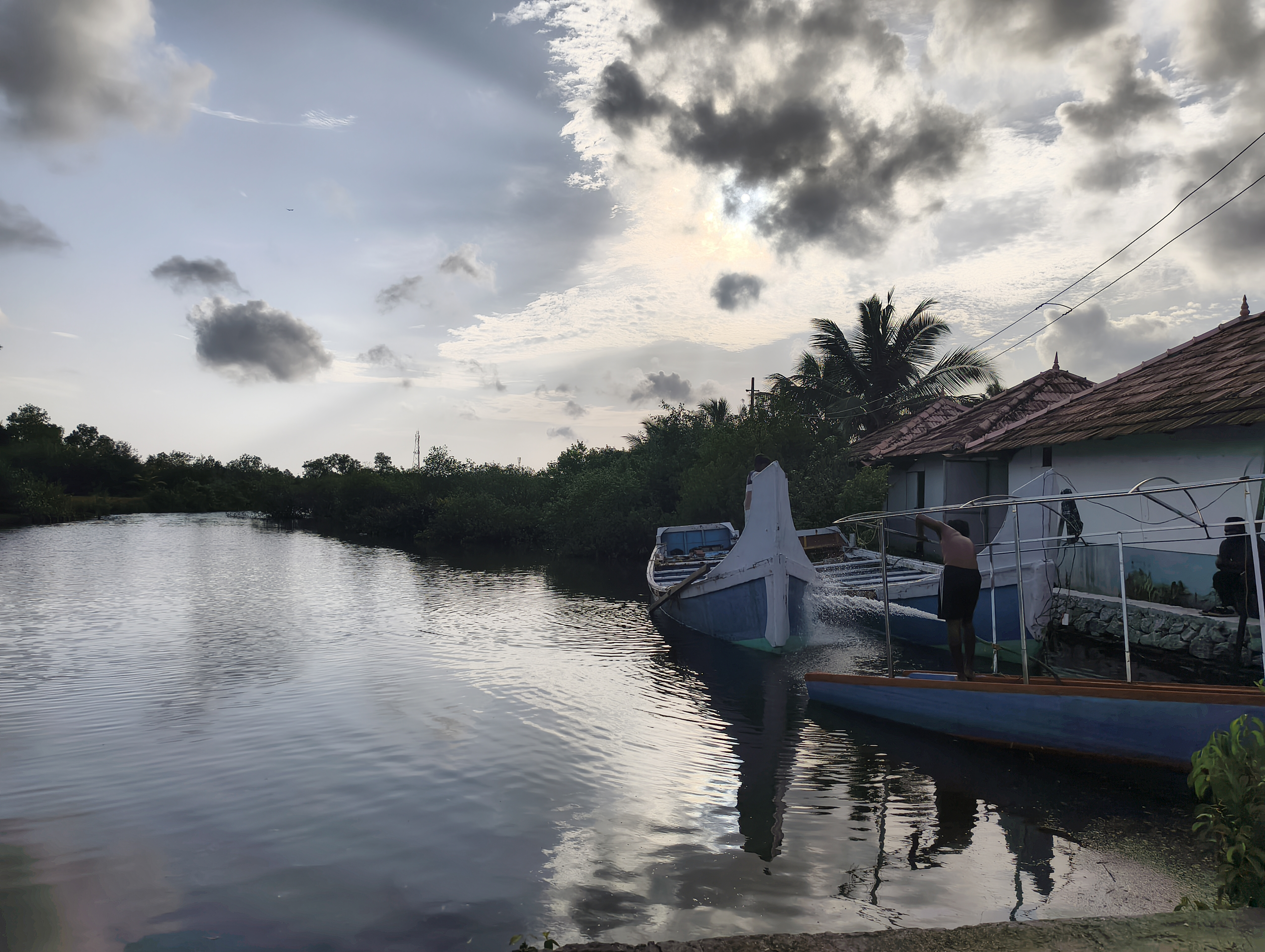
Boat Service of Mundro Island

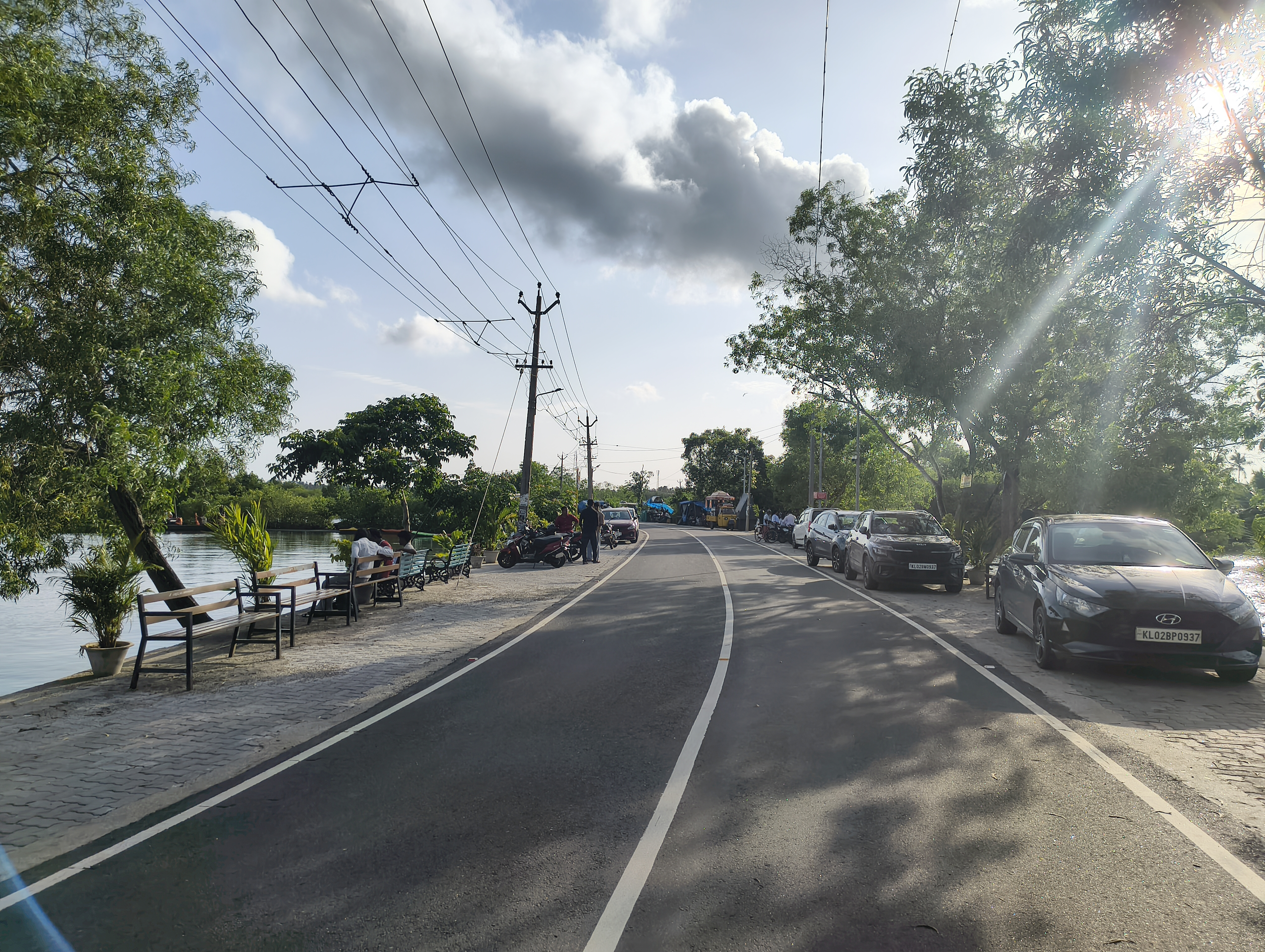
Street View of Mundro Island

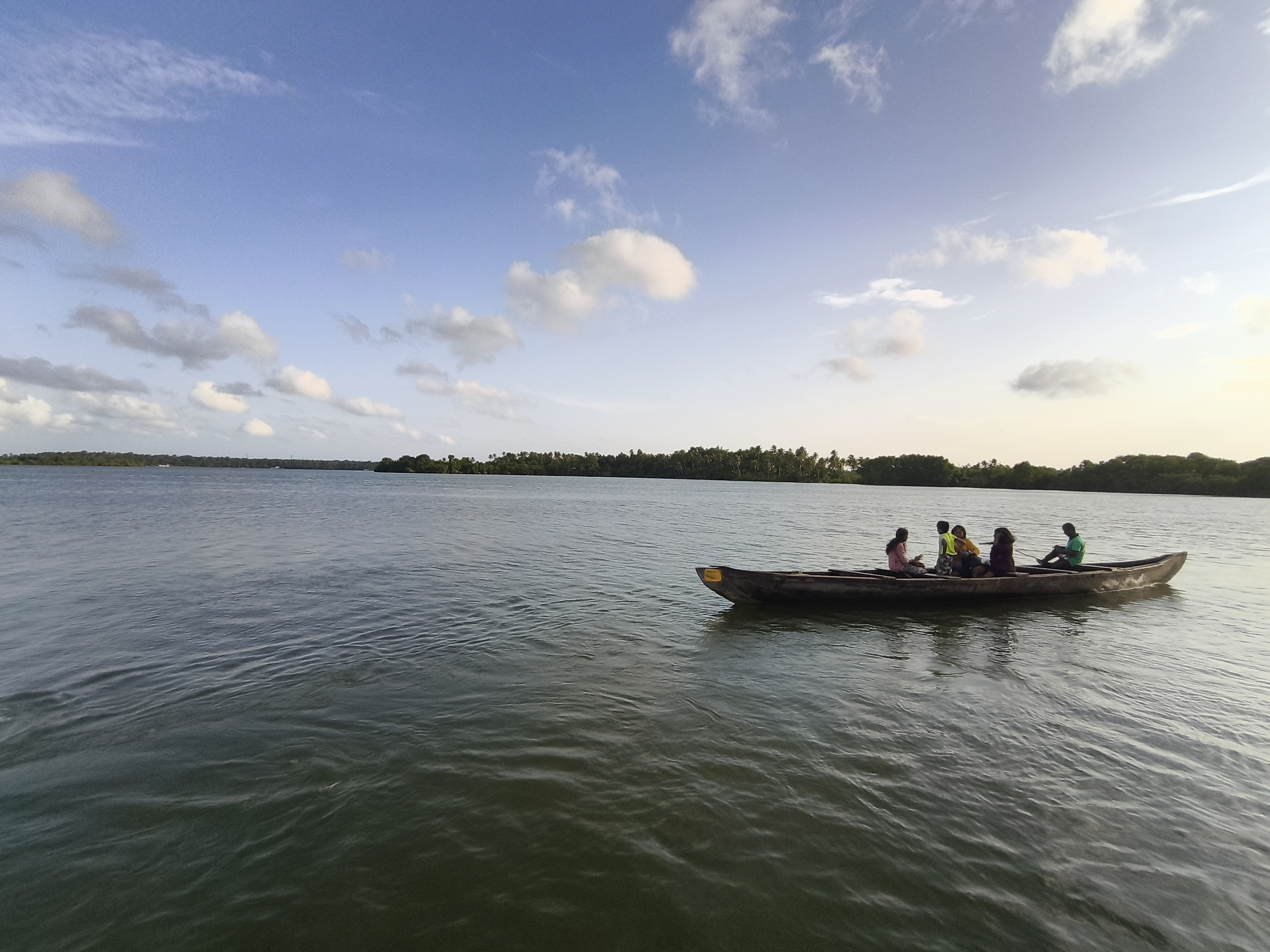
Boat Service of Mundro Island

== See also ==
- Mundrothuruth (Movie)
- Kakkathuruth
