= Chavara Thekkumbhagom =

Chavara Thekkumbhagom Mamukil
- island village
- Chavara South
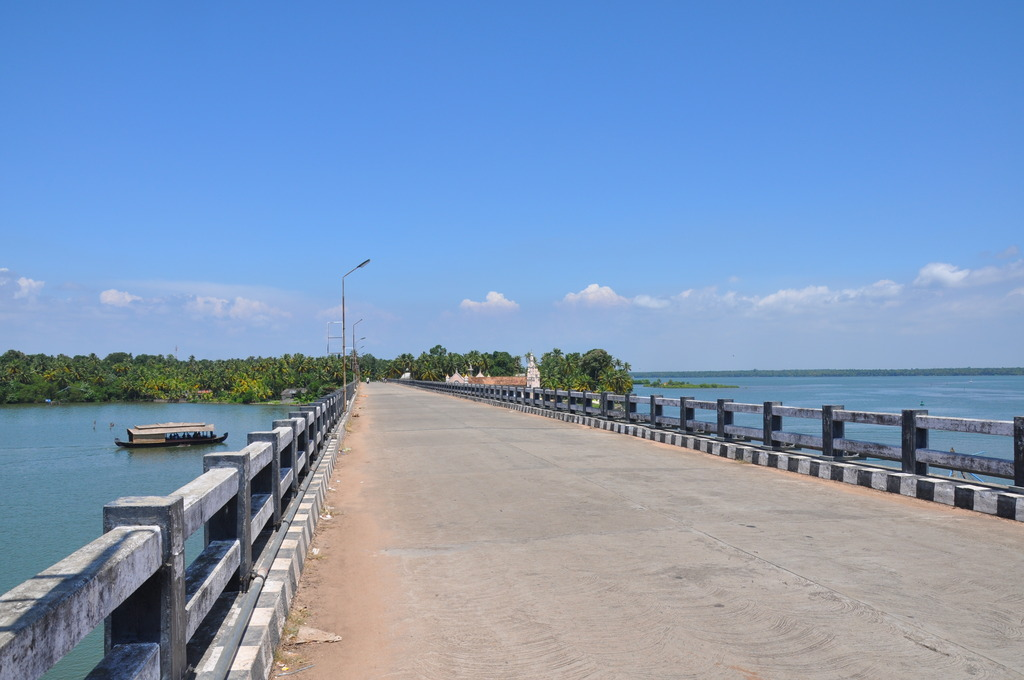
- Dalavapuram-Pallikodi Bridge in Thekkumbhagom which is one of the Biggest Bridges of Kollam

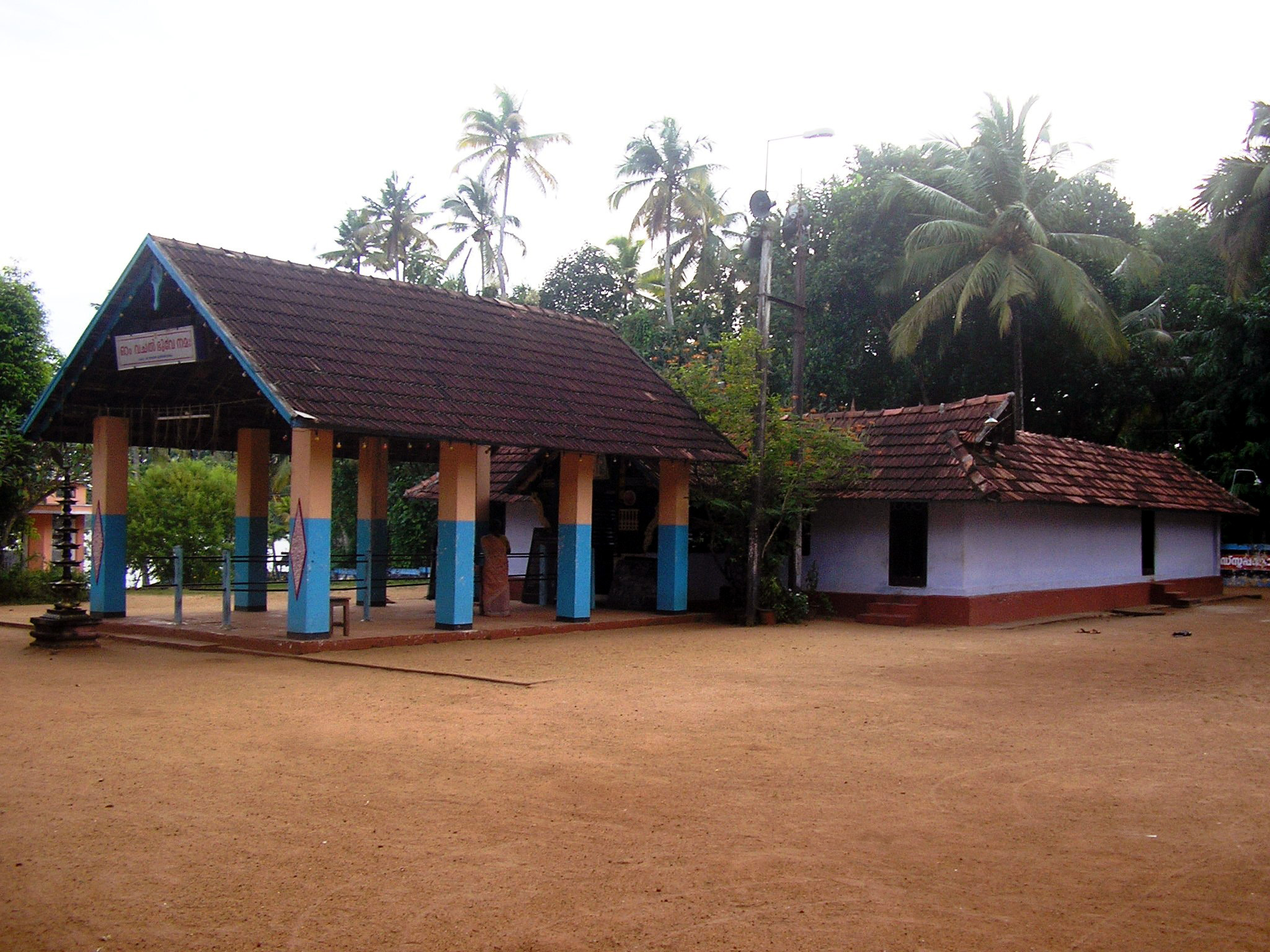
- Guhanandapuram Subramanya Swami Temple

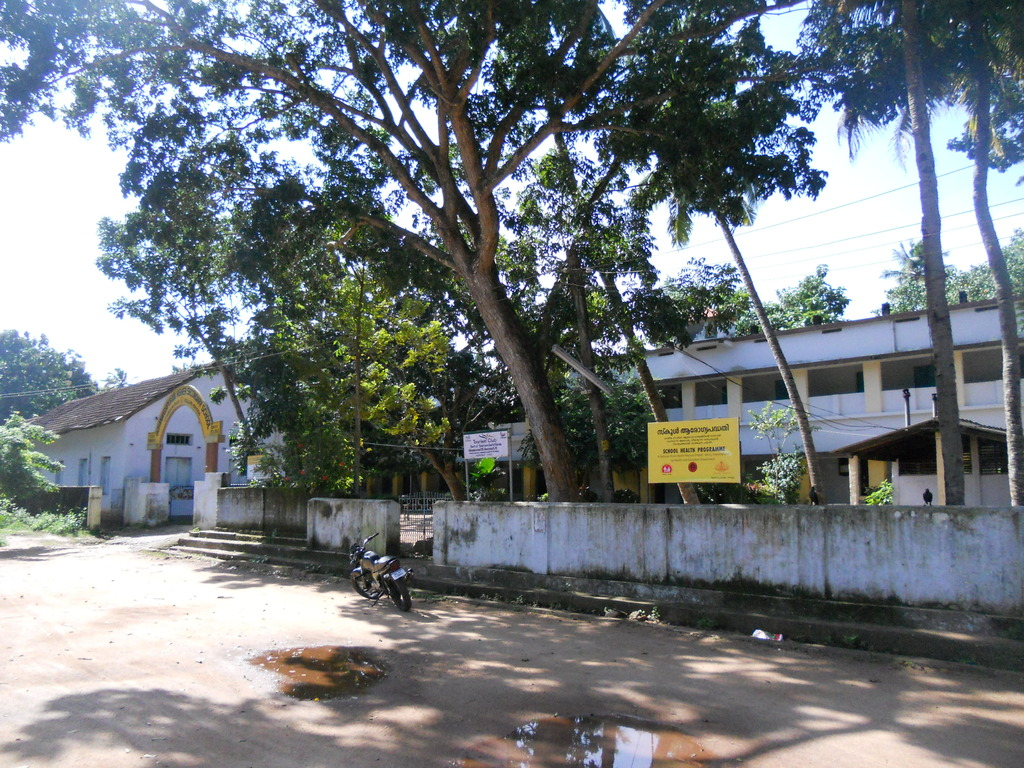
- Guhanandapuram Higher Secondary School (Only Higher Secondary School In The Village)

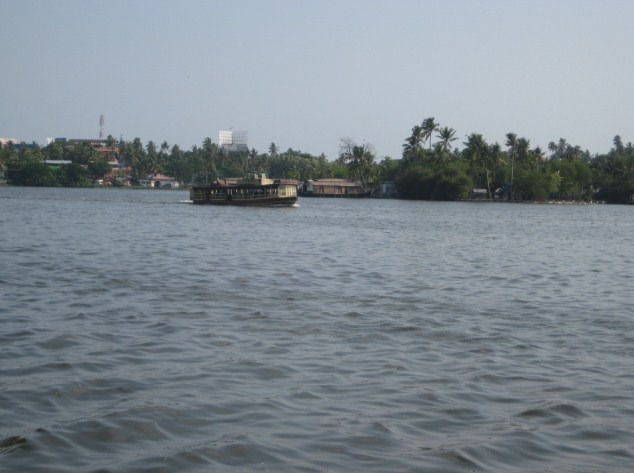
- Kollam-Guhanandapuram Boat service

- Location in Kerala, India Chavara Thekkumbhagom (India)
- Coordinates: 8°57′48″N 76°33′43″E
- Country: India
- State: Kerala
- District: Kollam

Government
  - Type: Gram panchayat
  - Body: Thekkumbhagom Gram panchayat
  - Panchayath President: Thankachi Prabhakaran
  - Vice President: Prabhakaran Pillai

Area
  - Total: 8 km^{2} (3.1 sq mi)

Population As per 2011 census
  - Total: 16,937
  - Density: 2,100/km^{2} (5,500/sq mi)

Languages
- Time zone: UTC+5:30 (IST)
- PIN: 691584
- STD code: 0476
- Vehicle registration: KL-02,KL-23
- Nearest City: Kollam - 10 km (20 minutes)
- Nearest Railway Station: Kollam Junction railway station (QLN)
- Neighbourhoods: Kollam Municipal Corporation, Neendakara, Chavara, Thevalakkara
- Public transport Service is Operated between Kollam and Karunagappally Via Thekkumbhagom by KSRTC from 5.00 am to 8.10pm running every 30 minutes . LAST BUS from Kollam is at 8.10 from kollam KSRTC bus stand. YOU CAN BOARD AT 8.15 PM FROM CHINNAKADA ALSO

Chavara Thekkumbhagom or Chavara South is an Island village in Kollam District of the state of kerala, India. It is located 10 km from the Kollam City. It is covered by Ashtamudi Lake and located near the coast of Indian Ocean.It contains a famous Devi temple and Subramanya temple along with St Joseph's Church. It has only 2 outer connections via Dalavapuram pallikodi Bridge and Pavumba Bridge.

== Notable people ==
- V.Sambasivan - From Guhanandapuram-NaduvathuCherry, Thekkumbhagom, A performer of the art Kadhaprasangam. written by himself and Othello by Shakespeare.
- Azhakathu Padmanabha Kurup-From Azhakathu-NaduvathuCherry, Thekkumbhagom, A renowned scholar in Sanskrit and Malayalam, who composed the first Malayalam epic poem Ramachandravilasam.
