= Asramam Maidan =

Park in Kollam city, Kerala, India

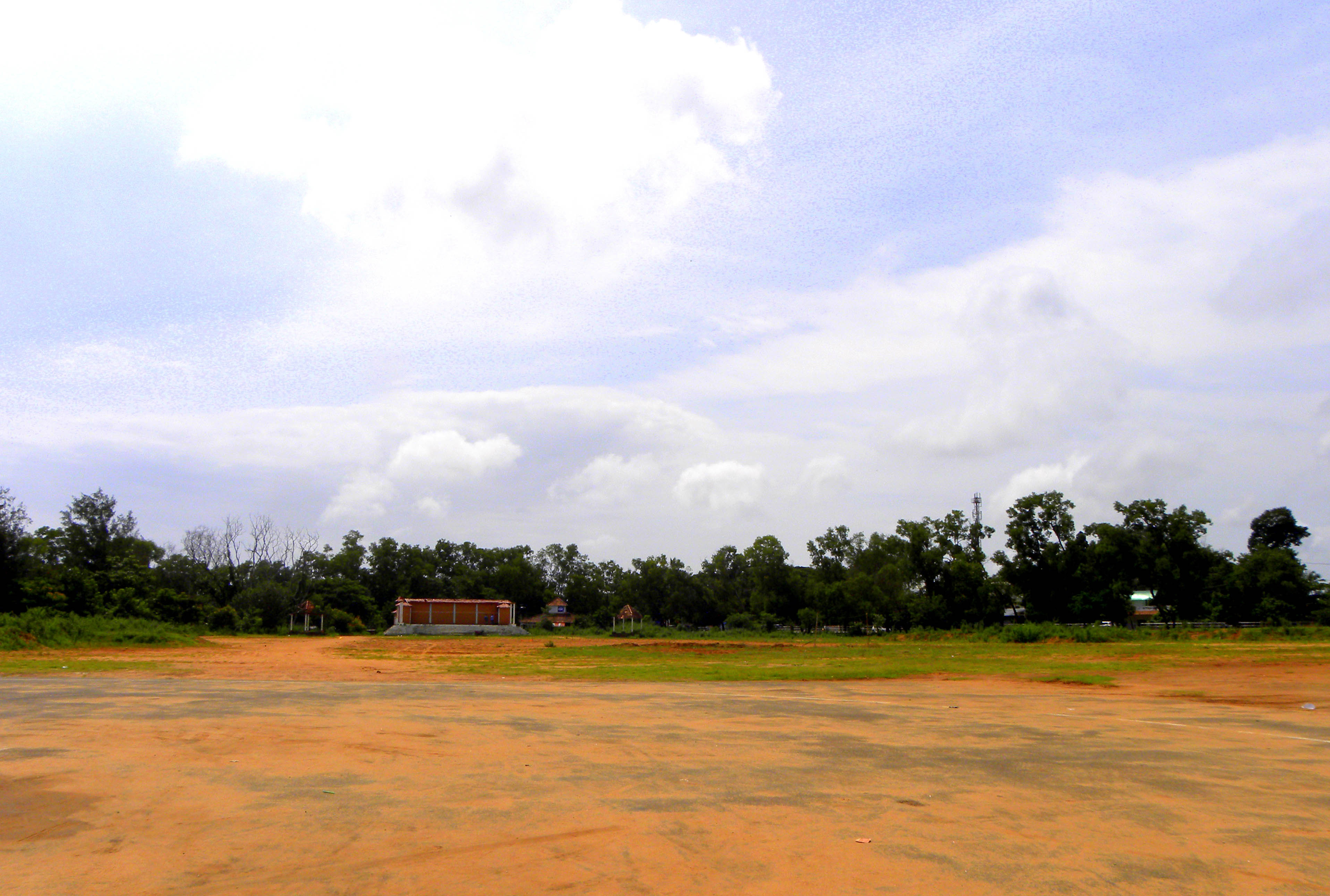
- Asramam Maidan, Kollam

- Location within Kollam Location within Kerala Location within India
- Location: Asramam
- Nearest city: Kollam, Kerala
- Coordinates: 8°53′36.8″N 76°35′36.7″E
- Area: 71 acres (29 ha)
- Founder: East India Company
- Operator: DTPC, Kollam
- Open: All year
- Public transit: Bus Station - 1.6 km Rail Station - 2.2 km Ferries - 1.6 km

The Asramam Maidanam or Ashramam Maithanam is an urban park, or maidhanam, in the city of Kollam, in Kerala, India. At 72 acres (29 ha), it is the largest open space within Kerala Municipal Corporation limits. The maidan is considered one of the green lungs of the city and regularly hosts the city's main cultural and sports events. It holds an adventure park children's park, picnic village, British Residency and mangrove forests making it an important tourism spot in the city.

The Asramam maidan is the major training hub of all the driving school operators in Kollam city.

== History ==
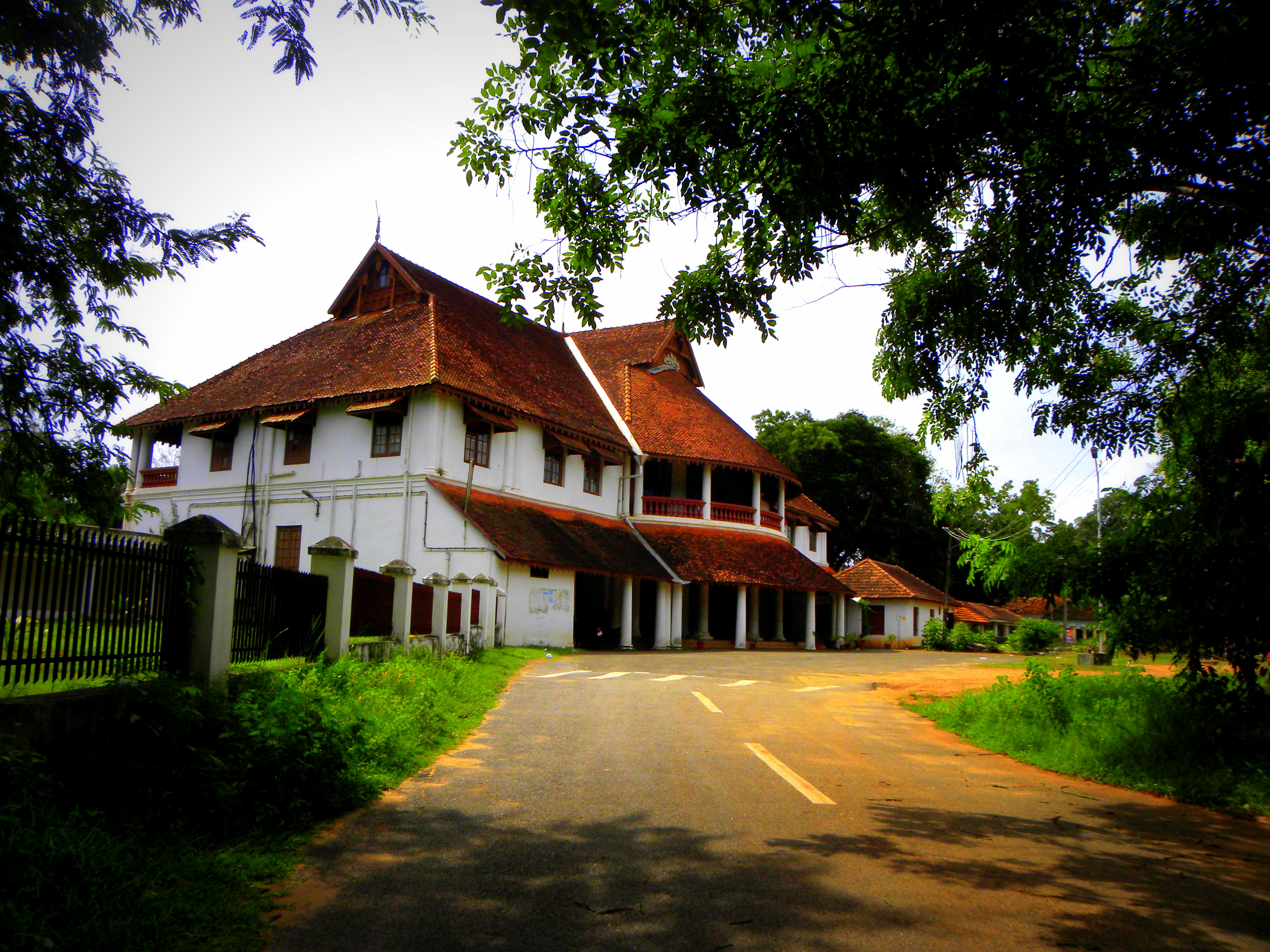
British Residency in Asramam, Kollam - Till 1829, Quilon was the capital of the Travancore State and the quarters of the British Residency.

Asramam Maidan was used as an aerodrome during the British Raj. At that time there were no civil aerodromes either in Thiruvananthapuram or anywhere else in the erstwhile kingdoms of Travancore and Kochi nor in the British-ruled Malabar area of the Madras Presidency. Chartered flights, mainly using Avro aircraft, would land and take off from Quilon Aerodrome. The aerodrome was primarily used by VIPs from Madras en route to Thiruvananthapuram, who after landing at Quilon, would proceed to Thiruvananthapuram by car. Quilon Aerodrome was also used for flying training. During one such training exercise, an aircraft hit a tree on the boundary of the aerodrome, killing the pilot and the trainee. Training operations were stopped after the accident, but civilian aircraft continued to use the aerodrome.

Because of the loose soil in the Asramam area, the landing and take-off areas were prepared by bringing huge quantities of red laterite soil from the hilly areas. The aerodrome had strong barbed wire fencing round it, with two entry points, one at the south and the other at the north. There were no buildings in the aerodrome, not even a shed, although there was a concrete area in the shape of a ring where the planes stopped after landing. It was here that the passengers alighted and boarded the plane. Planes used to land sometimes once in two months. The airport then came under the control of Kerala Public Works Department (PWD). Residents of Asramam knew in advance about the arrival of planes, because the PWD authorities, on getting information about a coming arrival, hoisted a windsock on a tall wooden mast.

After the commissioning of Thiruvananthapuram airport and its development, Quilon Aerodrome went into decline, and finally, planes stopped arriving there. The aerodrome remained fenced off for a long time. Later, the fence was destroyed and its granite stumps pilfered. The only reason the maidan was not encroached upon was that it was a central government property. Now there are two large helipads at the maidan.

== Walkway ==
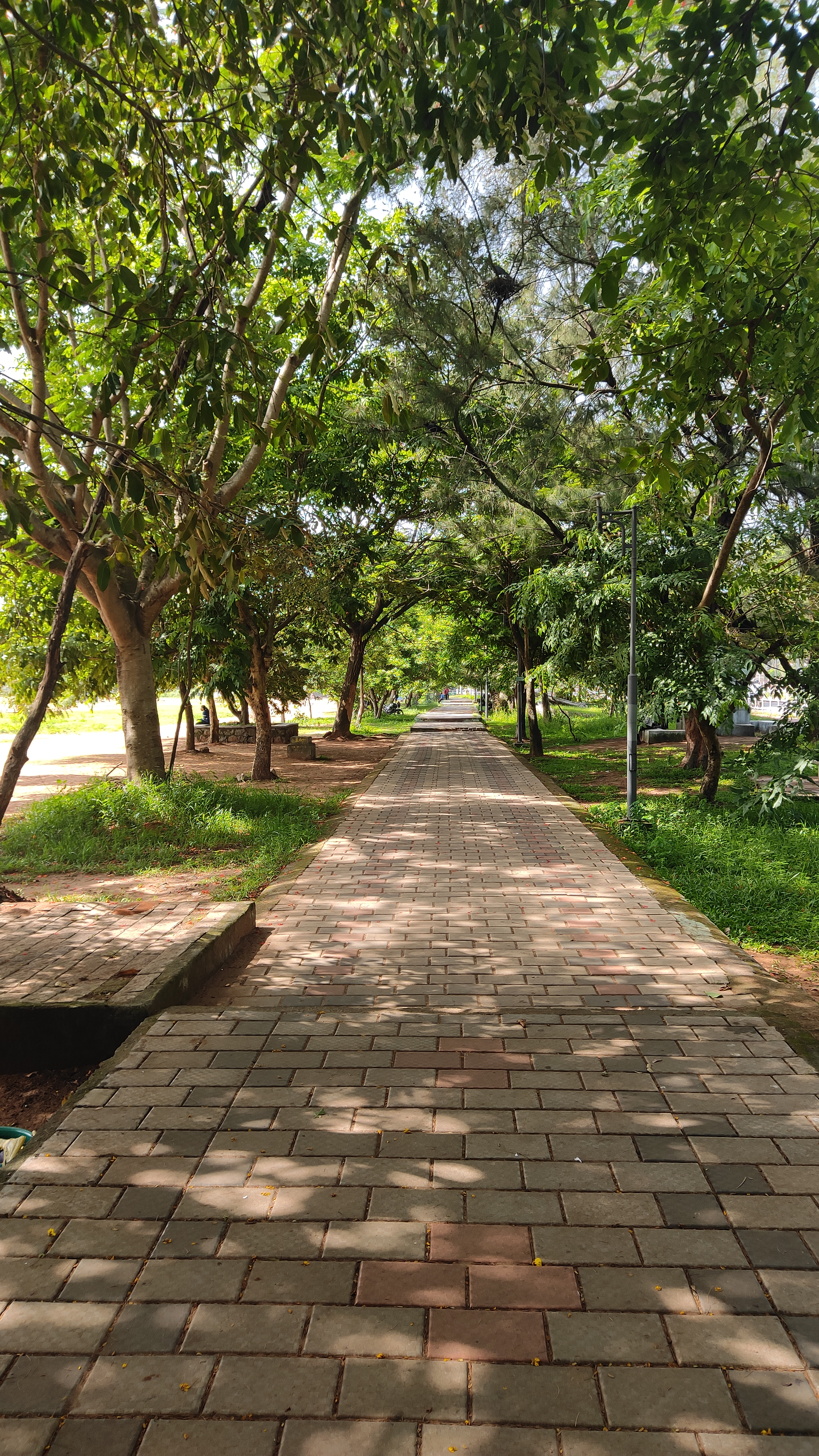
Walkway

A walkway of about 2.3 km is constructed around the ground, facilitating jogging and exercises.

== Events ==
Underwater Oceanos expo held at Asramam Maidan in Oct 2018

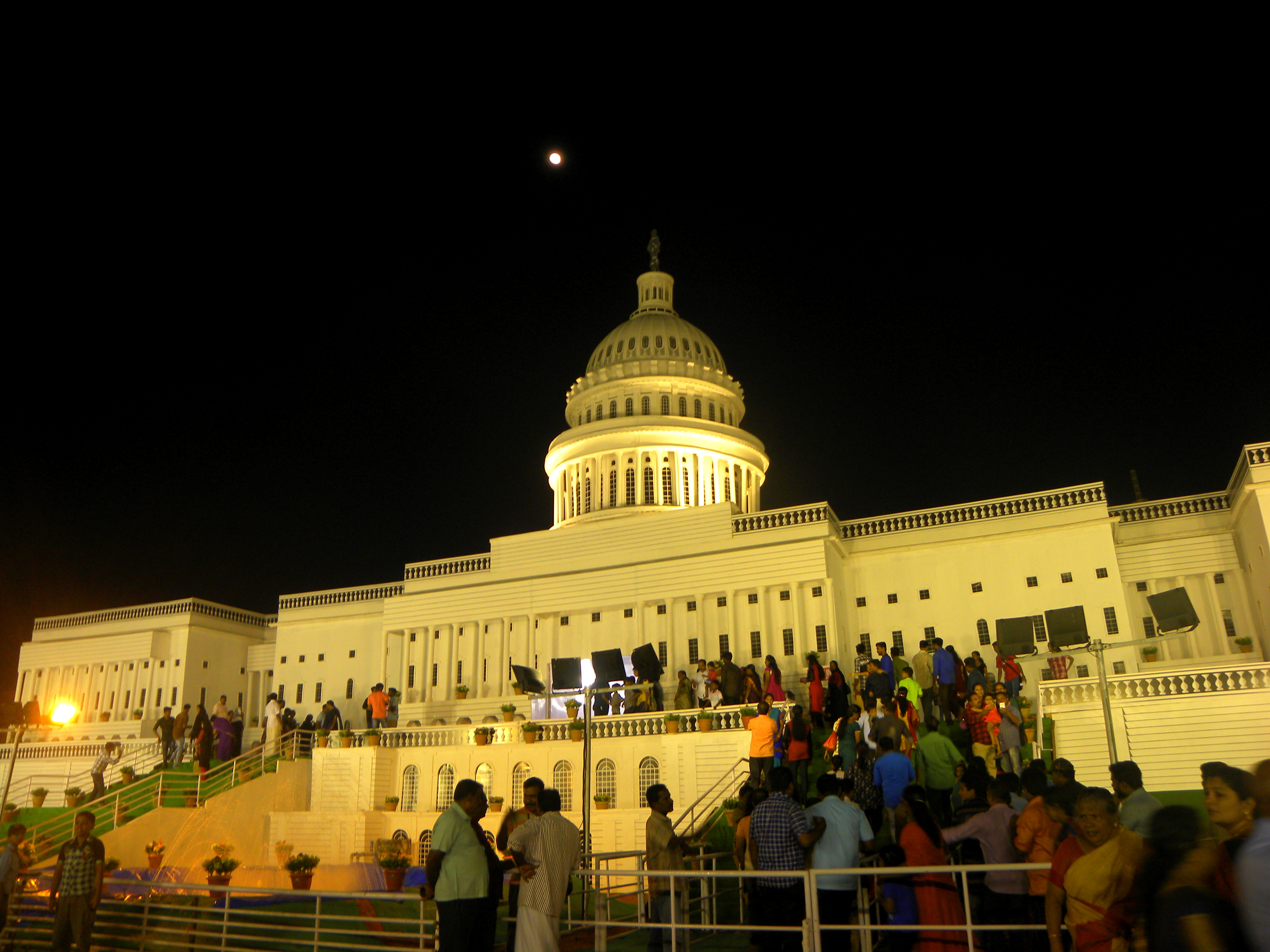
United States Capitol model entrance of Kollam Fest-2016, held at Asramam Maidan

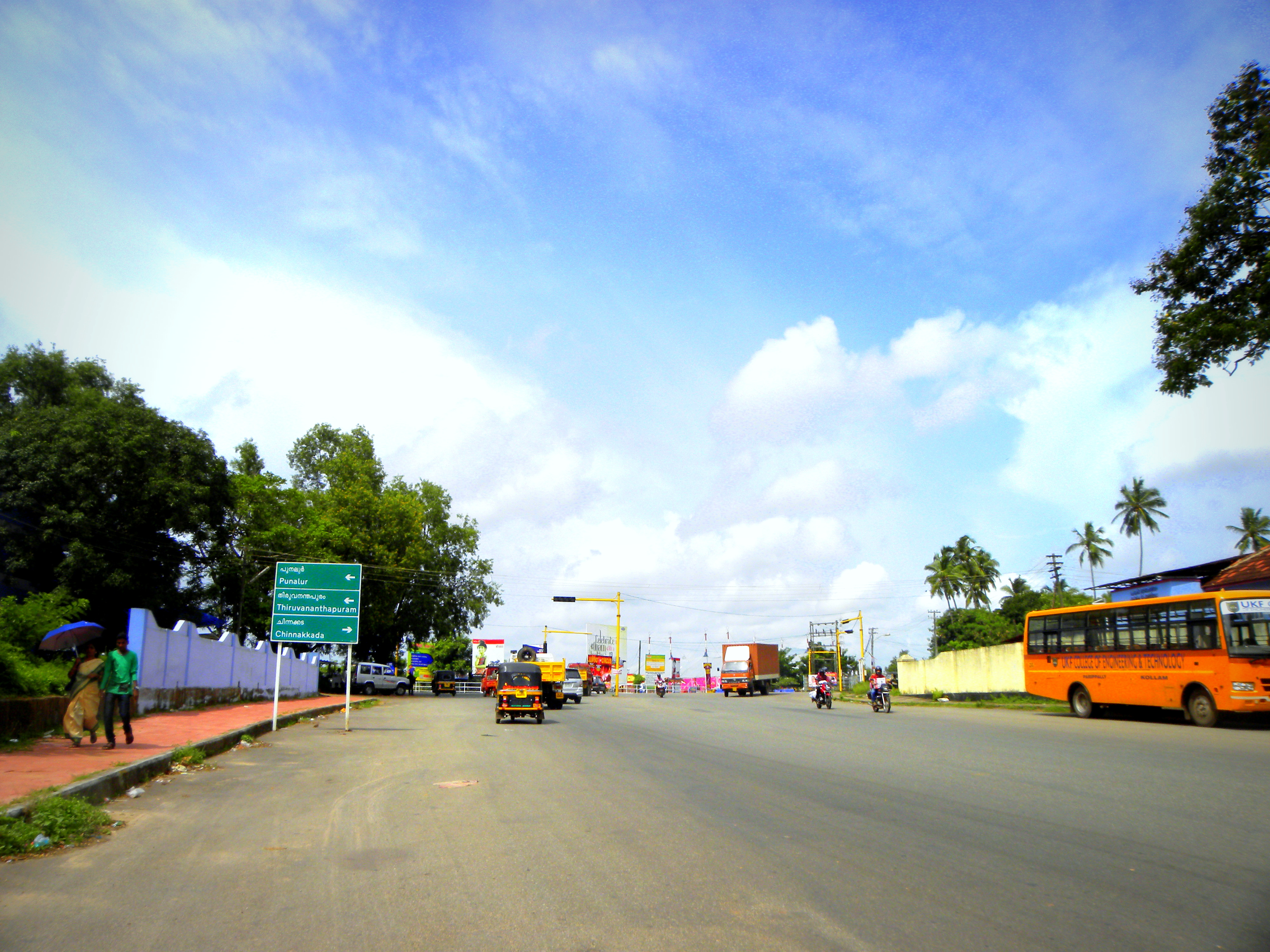
Link Road at Asramam

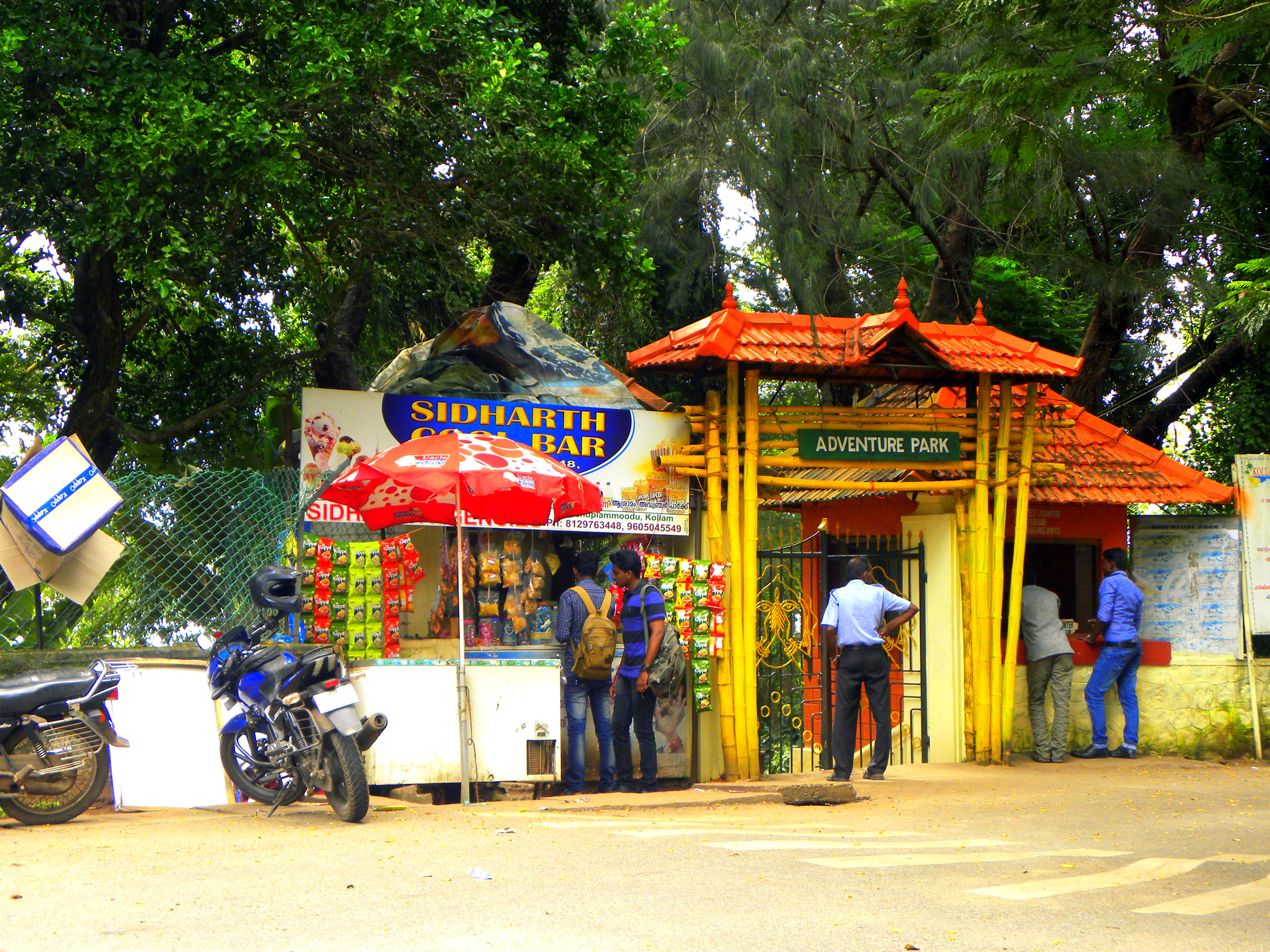
Entrance of Asramam Adventure Park, Kollam

Asramam Maidan is the regular venue for many events including recruitment rallies for the Indian Army, Kollam Pooram, Kollam Fest, cricket tournaments, large weddings and various events of a political or non-political nature.

Kollam Fest

Kollam Fest is an international event with focus on art, culture, trade, and tourism. The event, organised by the Kollam City Corporation, was aimed at presenting the history and culture of Kollam to the world.

Kollam Pooram

Kollam Pooram is one of the most colorful festivals of Kerala, attracting a large number of people from all parts of the state. The Kollam Pooram, organised in connection with the annual festival of the Asramam Sri Krishnaswamy Temple, is held annually at the Asramam Maidan in the month of April. The festival has now assumed the status of a national festival, and gets the biggest government allocation for such an event after Thrissur Pooram.

Cricket matches

Asramam Maidan is a regular ground for the Kerala Cricket Association's matches, which are held almost all year round.

== Future development proposals ==
- Following a preliminary inspection by a team of experts, in 2009 plans were drawn up for the construction of an airstrip and an aviation school at Asramam Maidan. Supporters of the project said that the school would increase the importance of the city. However, after an inspection, the team reported that the maidan was not suitable for the project because of the presence of several high-rise structures in the vicinity and local protests against the project.
- The government of Kerala has decided to preserve the Asramam Maidan and the adjacent guest house complex in Kollam city as a heritage complex.
- The Corporation of Kollam has been sanctioned Rs. 52 lakhs in the 2017-18 financial year's budget for constructing cycle track around the Asramam maidan.

== Ashtashilpas ==
Kerala Lalitha Kala Akademi Kollam in association with District Tourism Promotion Councils (DTPC) conducted 'Ashtashilpa' ten day sculpture camp organized at Kollam Ashram grounds as part of 'Walkway'. Sculptures in concrete medium were made in the camp. It was decided to make eight sculptures based on the eight directions of Ashtamudi lake. As it is a part of the heritage road project which is a reenactment of the history and tradition of Kollam. The sculptors are prominent from different parts of Kerala.

Sculptures and sculptors

- Kuravanum Kurathiyum - Guruprasad Ayyappan (Kollam)
- Mother and Child - KV Jyothilal (Kollam)
- Winter Morning- V. Satheesan (Thiruvananthapuram)
- Two Horses - KRT Tinu (Kannur)
- One of Us - Pramod Gopalakrishnan (Thrissur)
- Peache Ki Or - Sanu Ramakrishnan (Vaikkam)
- Imagining Human - Giri Vasudevan (Idukki)
- From The Margin - Schenley (Collam)
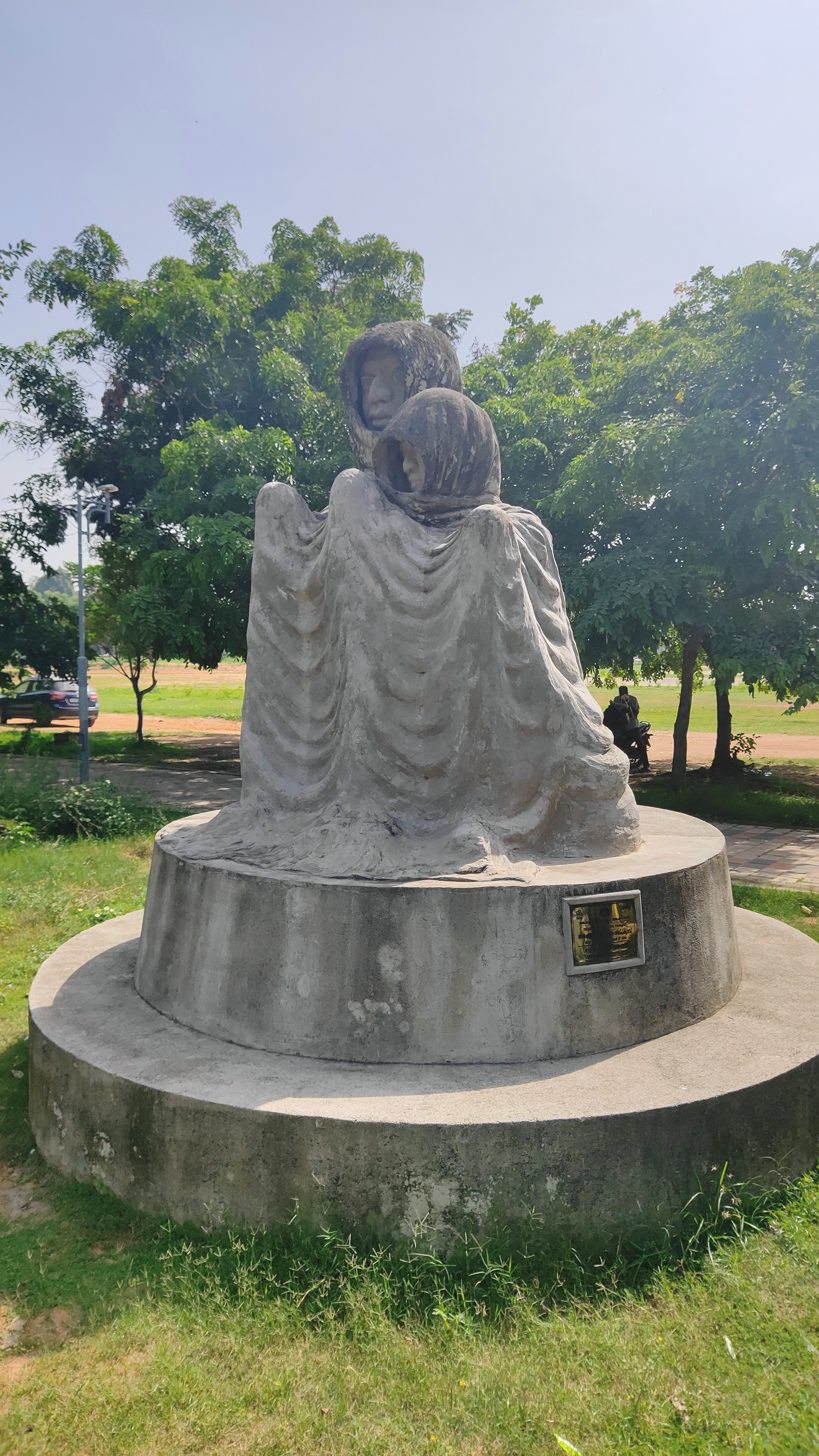
Winter Morning

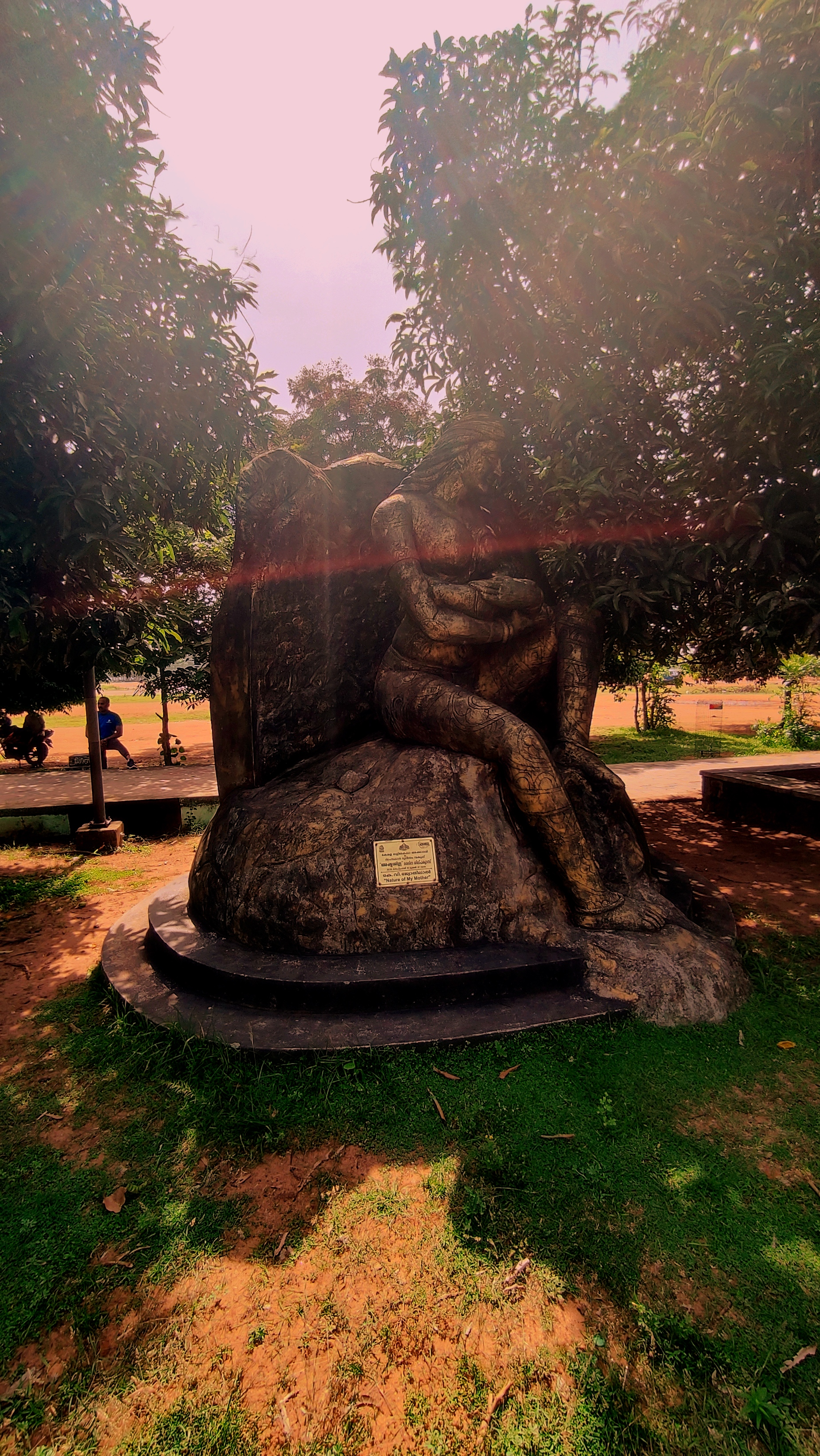
Nature of my Mother

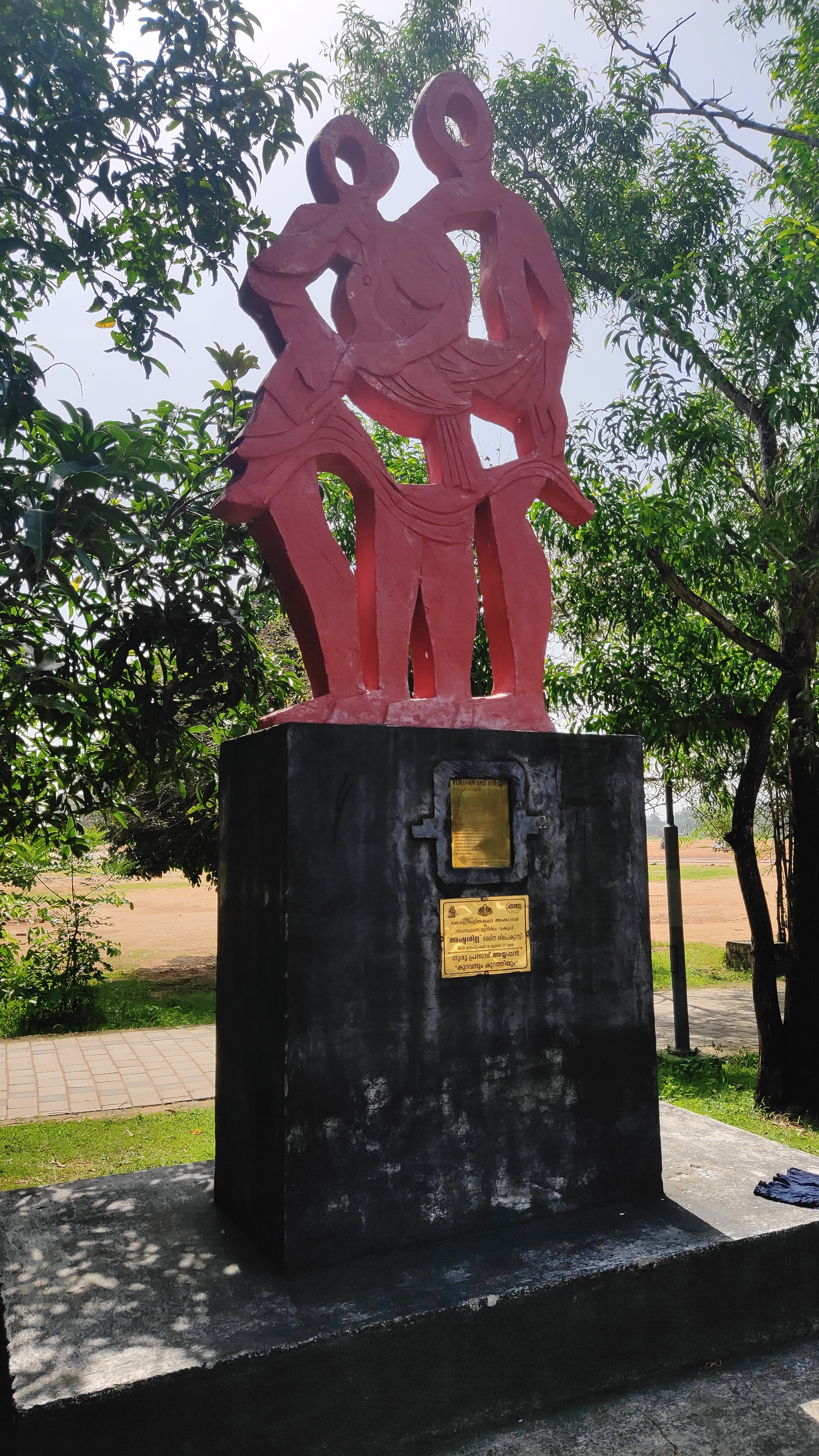
Kuravanum Kurathiyum

== Local public and private institutions ==
- ESIC Model & Super Speciality Hospital
- Traffic control room, Kerala Police
- International Astro Turf Hockey Stadium
- Dr. Nair's Hospital
- KTDC Tamarind Hotel
- Kerala Cricket Association, Kollam branch
- Kadappakada Sports Club
- Office of the Deputy Superintendent of Police, Kollam

== See also ==
- Kollam Airport
- Kadappakada
- Chinnakada
- List of cricket grounds in India
