= Manichithodu =

Manichithodu (Malayalam: മണിച്ചിത്തോട്) is a prominent urban water stream and canal located in Kollam, Kerala, India. It serves as a vital natural stormwater drainage system for parts of the Kollam municipal corporation areas like Kadappakkada, Kuravanpalam, Ashramam before draining into the ecologically sensitive Ashtamudi Lake, a designated Ramsar wetland site.

Manichithodu plays a crucial role in preventing urban flooding in Kollam by channeling heavy monsoon runoff out of the city. However, in recent decades, the canal has faced severe environmental degradation due to rapid urbanization.
