= Children's Park, Kollam =

Park in Kollam, India

Children's Park, Asramam
- Children’s Park, Kollam; Children’s Traffic Park
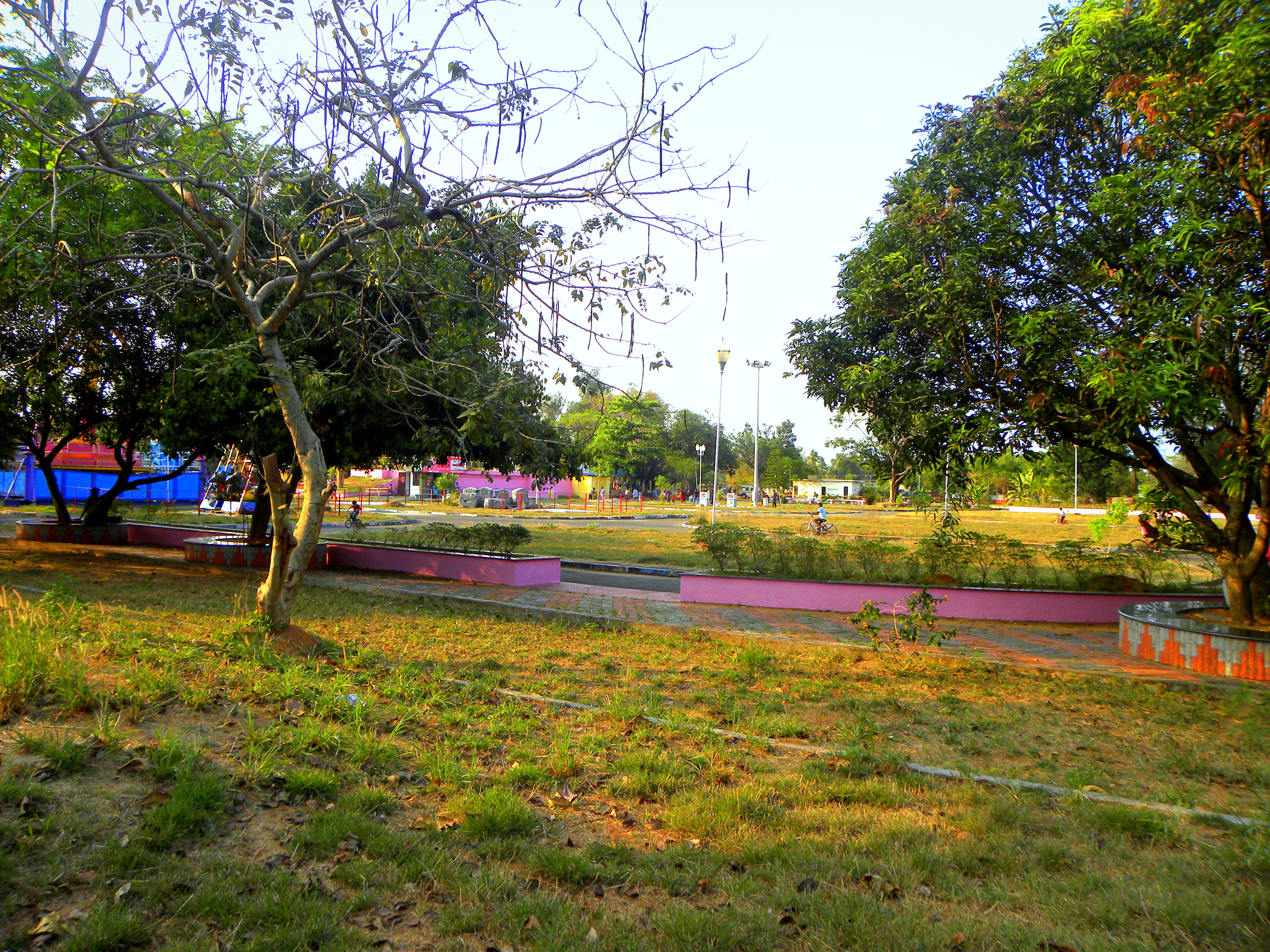
- Children's Park at Asramam, Kollam city
- Interactive map of Children's Park, Asramam
- Type: Children's park
- Location: Kollam City, India
- Coordinates: 8.896385°N 76.587999°E
- Operator: Kollam Municipal Corporation
- Status: Open all year

Asramam Children's Park (also known as Children's Park, Kollam) is a park for children, situated at Asramam in Kollam city, Kerala. The park is owned by Kollam Municipal Corporation, India. It is also called Children’s Traffic Park. This park is considered as a part of Asramam Picnic Village, main centre for recreational activities in Kollam city. A model Adventure Park and a 200-year-old British Residency (which is considered as a Government Guest House) are situated very close to this park.

== Location ==
- Kollam KSRTC Bus Station – 1.2 km
- Kollam Junction railway station – 3.8 km
- Chinnakada – 1.2 km
- Kollam Port – 3.4 km
- Kollam Ferry Terminal – 1.2 km
- Andamukkam City Bus Stand – 2.6 km

== Facilities and attractions ==
The Children's Park in Asramam is one of the major attractions of Kollam city. The Government of Kerala modernized the park with Central Government aid in 2009–2010. It got another facelift in 2014, with the addition of a swimming pool and new rides.

- Gateway
- Compound wall
- Mandapams
- Restroom complex
- Open-air auditorium
- Toilet block
- Swimming pool
- Restaurant
- Shopping stalls
- 250kv Transformer
- Multi-purpose Gymnasium
- Video Games

=== Rides ===
- Air Balloon ride
- Battery cars
- Break Dance ride
- Dashing/Bombing Cars
- Cycles
- Duck boat
- Flying singer rider
- Giraffe Train ride
- Sun-Moon wheel

Nowadays, this children's park is a regular exhibition ground for the Kollam Flower Show.
