= Adventure Park, Kollam =

Park in Kollam, Kerala

Adventure Park Asramam Adventure Park
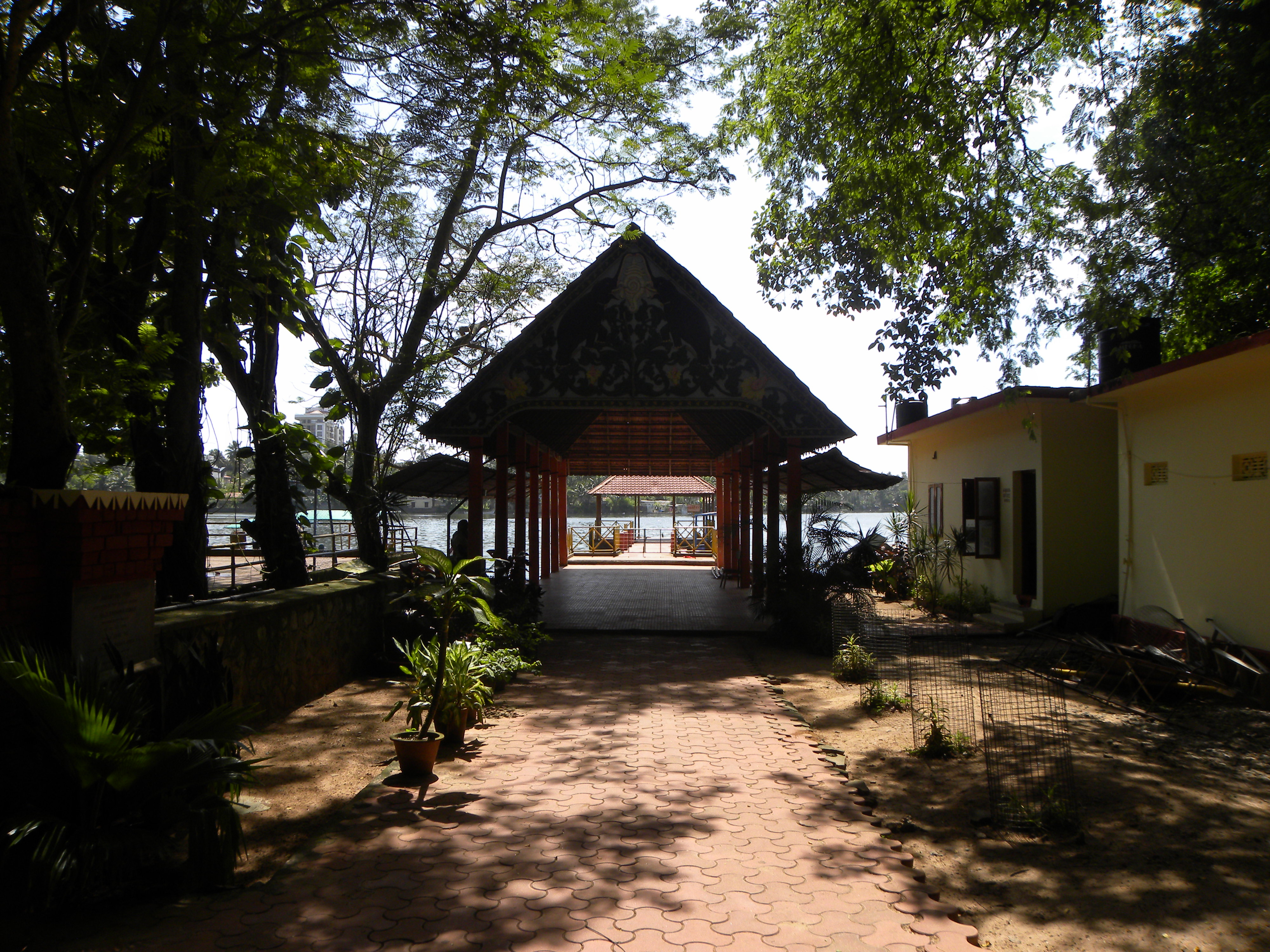

- Location within Kollam Location within Kerala Location within India
- Type: Urban park
- Location: Asramam in Kollam city, India
- Coordinates: 8°53′50″N 76°35′06″E
- Area: 48 acres (0.19 km^{2})
- Created: 1980
- Owner: Kollam Municipal Corporation (KMC)
- Operator: DTPC, Kollam
- Status: Open all year

Asramam Adventure Park is an urban park in the core Kollam city of Kerala state. It was opened after 1980, on 48 acres (19 ha) of city-owned land. Located beside the Kerala's pride, backwaters of Ashtamudi, this place popularly known as Asramam Picnic Village. It is the main centre of recreational activities in Kollam city. The Kollam District Tourism Promotion Councils (DTPC) conducts regular backwater cruises in houseboats, luxury boats and speedboats from the Boat Club. The mangroves near this park is very famous in all over India. So many endangered species of trees are surviving in the park.

== Major attractions ==
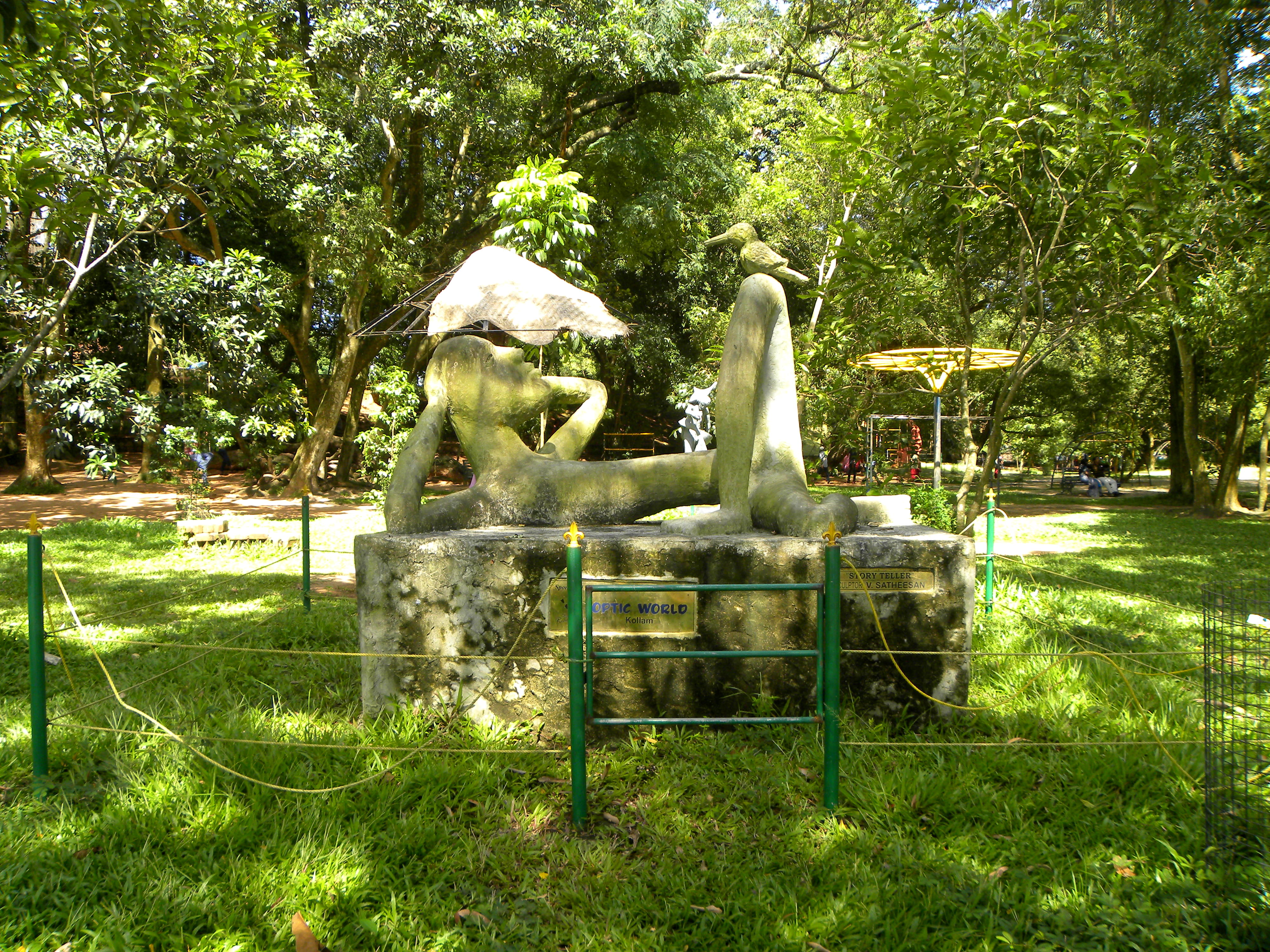
"Story Teller" sculpture in Adventure Park

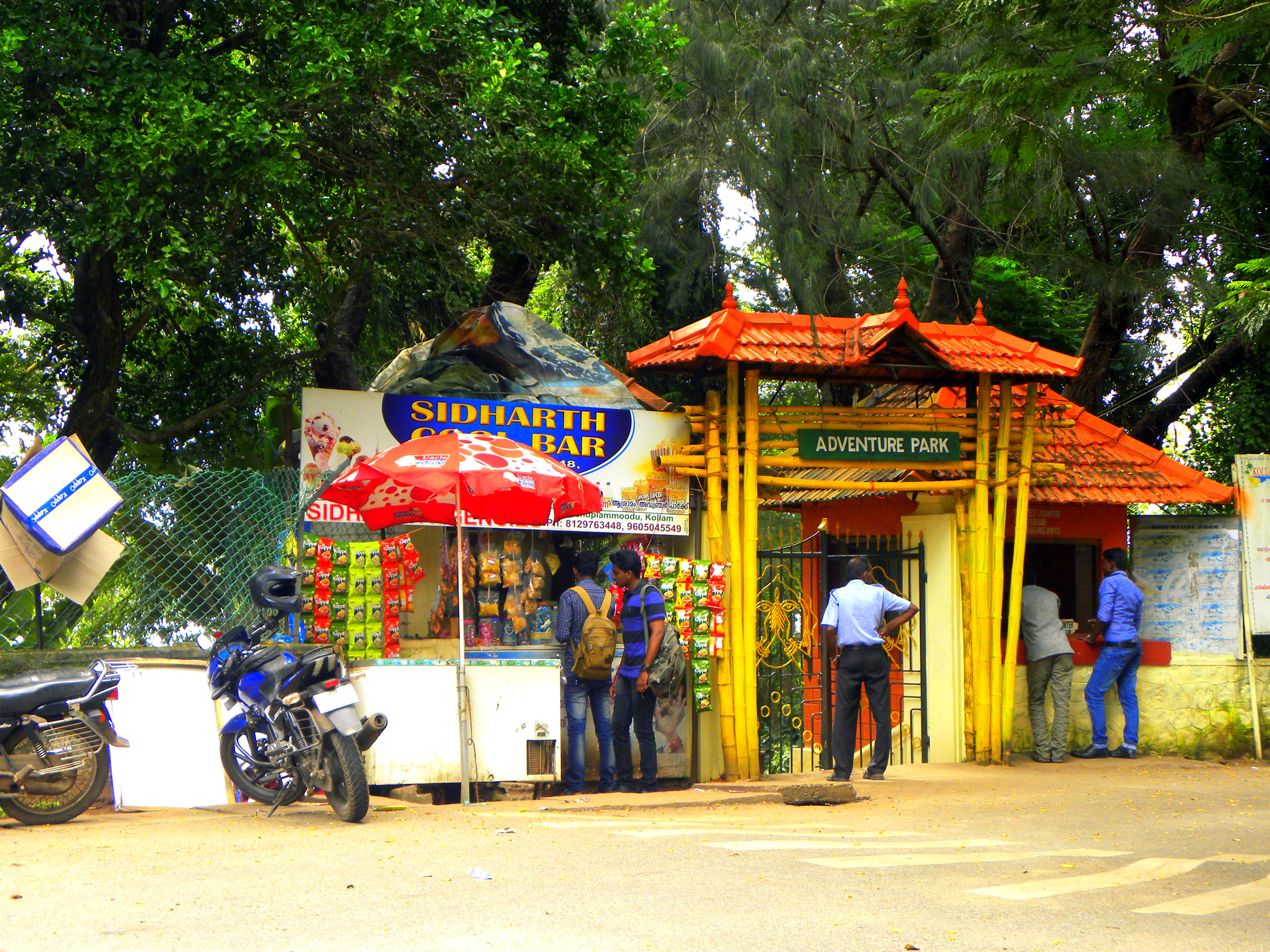
Entrance of Asramam Adventure Park, Kollam

There are so many attractions in and around Asramam Adventure Park. They are,

=== Sculptures ===
In 2012, the then Tourism Minister of Kerala, A.P. Anil Kumar had inaugurated 10 sculptors at Asramam Adventure Park. This had happened as part of a 10-day State-level sculpture camp named ‘Monsoon Sculptures’ at an estimated expenditure of Rs. 8 lakh sponsored by various Kollam-based business groups. Aryanad Rajendran's Meditation, V. Satheesan's Story Teller, Sivan's Bundle of slogans, Shenlay's Do not disturb, Saju Mannathur's She, Guruprasad's Love without heart and brain, Chavara Vijayan's Buddha 99 and Biju Bharatan's Victim are the major sculptors that makes adventure park one of the major eye-catching attractions in Kollam city.

=== Open gym ===
The first open gym of the state is coming-up at Asramam Adventure park at a cost of Rs.15 lakh. Morning walkers in Kollam city, arriving at the Asramam Maidan area, will be the biggest beneficiaries of this facility. Former Kollam Rajyasabha M.P K.N. Balagopal allocated the money for it from his Local Area Development (LAD) Fund. 19 fitness equipments have been installed and it would be open for the people by October end.

=== Asramam mangrove forest ===
The thick mangroves that grow on the shore of Ashtamudi Lake along the side of Asramam Adventure Park is another significant attraction in this spot. The Kerala State Biodiversity Board (KSBB) has provided the Asramam mangrove forest with a biodiversity heritage tag. Asramam mangrove spread was habitat to the highly endangered Syzygium travancoricum species of mangroves. Several species of mangroves and mangrove associates thrived there. The belt had all the characteristics of a coastal rainforest and was habitat to several species of wild animals and diversified flora. In addition to being a major spawning ground for several edible marine species, the Asramam mangroves in the past was also home to otters and migratory birds.

=== Boating ===
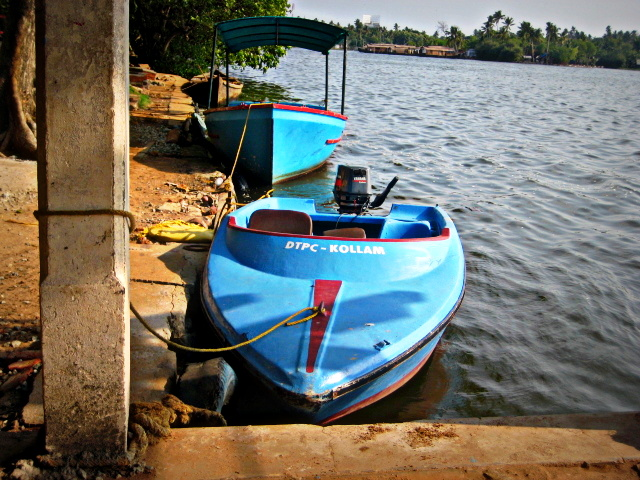
Kollam DTPC Boat yard in Adventure Park

The boating program conducted by Kollam District Tourism Promotion Councils (DTPC) from Asramam Adventure Park is one of the crowd pulling tourism programs in Kollam district. Regular backwater cruises in houseboats, luxury boats and speedboats are being operated from the Boat Club attached with the park. Different kinds of boats like luxury cruise boats, power boats and motor boats can be taken on hire from the boat jetty.

=== British Residency and Picnic Village ===
The British Residency in Asramam is also known as Government Guest House and Residency Bungalow. It is a two-storeyed palace situated at the picnic village campus. It was actually built by Col. John Munro during 1811 and 1819. It is now known as Government Guest House. It stands as a Hallmark of Quilon, like Chinnakada Clock Tower. It is a famous cine location in Kerala. Almost 90% of the Malayalam movie Manu Uncle was shot at British Residency and Adventure Park campus.

== See also ==
- Asramam
- Asramam Maidan
- Kollam
- Ashtamudi Lake
