= Asramam =

Asramam Asromom
- Neighbourhood
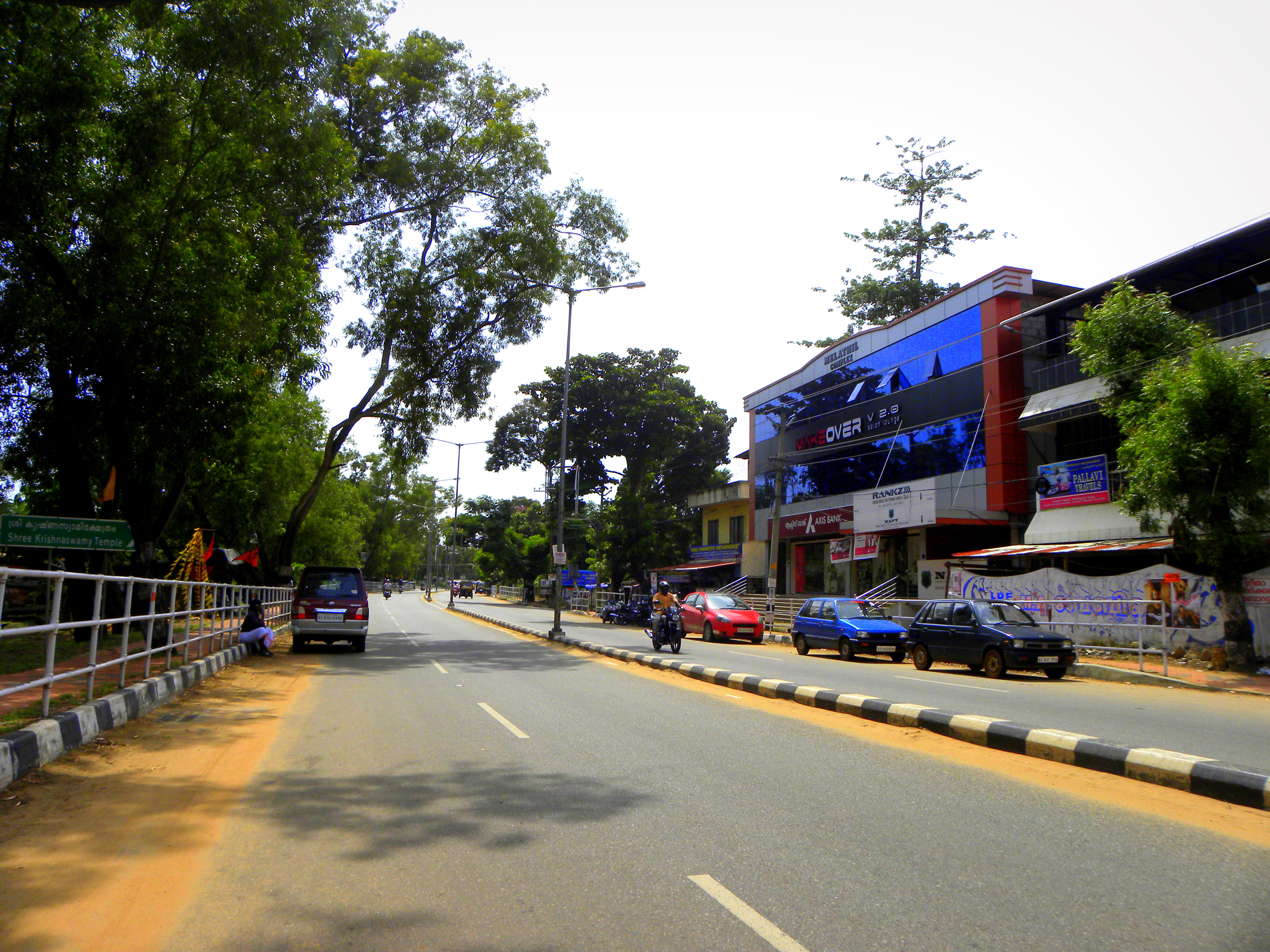
- Asramam Link Road

- Location in Kollam, India Asramam (Kerala) Asramam (India)
- Coordinates: 8.895888°N 76.592092°E
- Country: India
- State: Kerala
- District: Kollam

Government
  - Body: Kollam Municipal Corporation(KMC)

Languages
  - Official: Malayalam, English
- Time zone: UTC+5:30 (IST)
- PIN: 691002
- Vehicle registration: KL-02
- Lok Sabha constituency: Kollam
- Civic agency: Kollam Municipal Corporation
- Avg. summer temperature: 34 °C (93 °F)
- Avg. winter temperature: 22 °C (72 °F)
- Website: http://www.kollam.nic.in

Asramam or Ashramam is one of the prime locations in Kollam city of Kerala, India. It is one among the 55 wards of Kollam Municipal Corporation. Asramam is a notable place in the city because of the presence of old airport, public/private institutions, tourism destinations, parks, hospitals, maidan etc. Asramam Maidan, the biggest open space now existing in any of the Kerala Municipal Corporation limits is situated at Asramam. The first airport in the state of Kerala, Kollam Airport, was functioned in this maidan. Asramam is the headquarters of the Kollam branches of Indian Medical Association and Sports Authority of India. Link Road, one of the important roads in the city, passing through Asramam. The one and only International Hockey Stadium in the state is at Asramam.

== Importance ==
Asramam is one of the most important places of Kollam city. The city's biggest attractions like Adventure park, Children's park, Picnic Village and British Residency are situated at. The thick Mangrove forests in this area are very popular all over the state. 10 So many renowned hospitals in the city are situated near Asramam. Sankar's Institute of Medical Science[SIMS], Dr. Nair's Hospital, ESIC Model & Super Speciality Hospital etc. are the famous hospitals near Asramam.

Biodiversity Heritage Site

Asramam is going to become the first Biodiversity Heritage Site(BHS) in Kerala state. The 190 years old British Residency, rare varieties of mangrove spread on residency complex and the creek of Ashtamudi Lake would come under this heritage site.

== Public/private institutions nearby ==
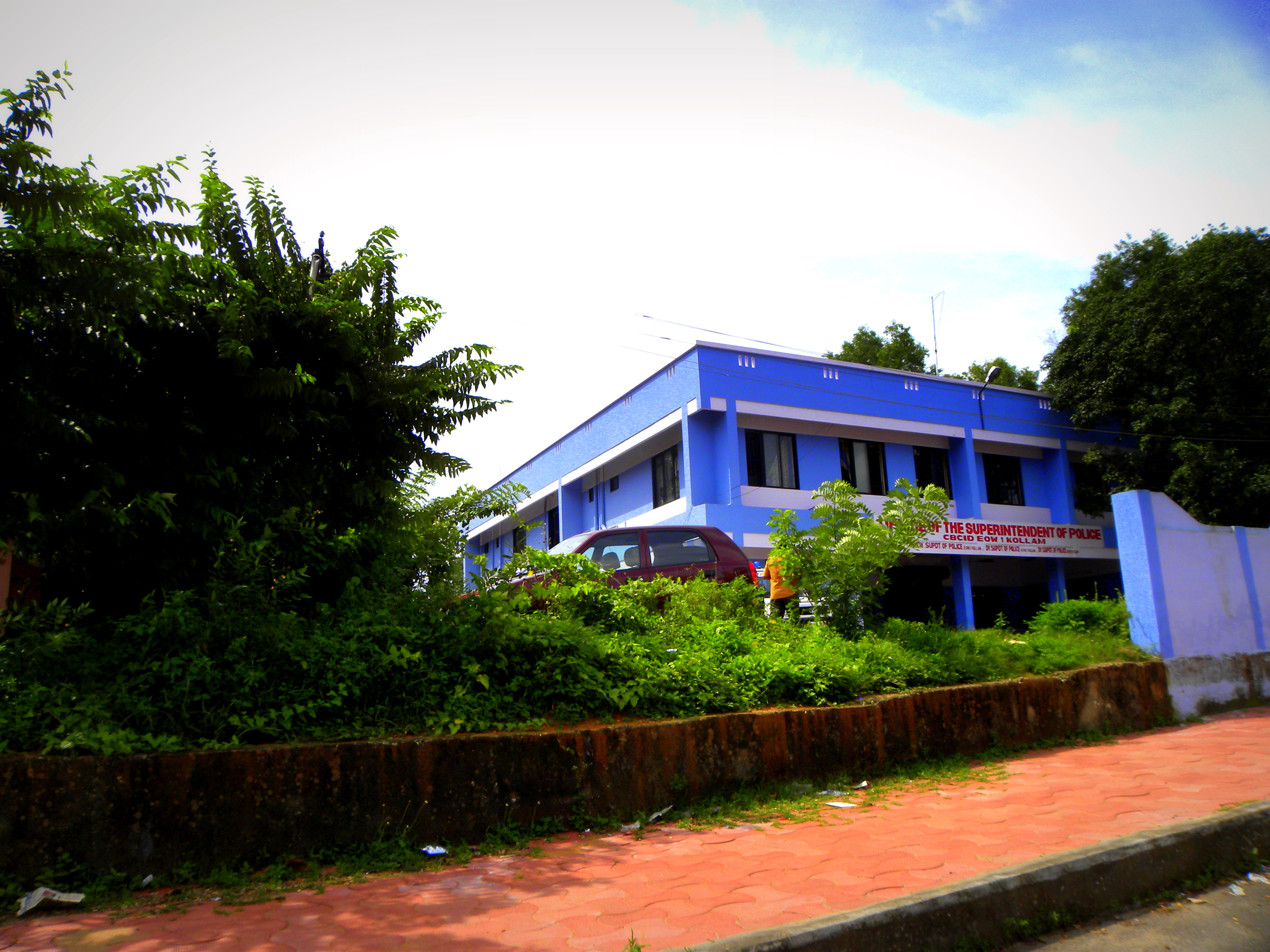
Office of the Superintendent of Police, Kollam

- International Hockey Stadium, Kollam
- KTDC Tamarind Hotel
- Factories & Boilers Department - Kerala Headquarters
- Occupational Health and Research Centre (OHRC)
- Office of the Asst. Executive Engineer - Harbour Engineering Department
- Office of the Marine Surveyor - Southern Zonal Office
- Asramam Adventure Park
- Children's Park
- ESIC Model & Super Speciality Hospital
- Kerala Cricket Association
- Apparel Training and Design Centre
- Dr. Nair's Hospital
- Office of the Deputy Superintendent of Police, Kollam
- Asramam Picnic Village
- Traffic control room, Kerala Police
- Nabeel Yousuf- professional procrastinator and ambivert

== See also ==
- Kollam Airport
- Asramam Maidan
- International Hockey Stadium, Kollam
- Asramam Link Road
- Kadappakada
- Chinnakada
- Kollam KSRTC Bus Station
