= Cheena Kottaram =

Building in India

Cheena Kottaram China Palace
- Interactive map of the Cheena Kottaram; China Palace area

General information
- Architectural style: Indo-Saracenic
- Location: Chinnakada, Kollam city, India
- Coordinates: 8.885402°N 76.591475°E
- Completed: 1904
- Client: Sri Mulam Tirunal Rama Varma

Cheena Kottaram or China Palace is a rest house that was constructed in 1904 for Sri Mulam Tirunal Rama Varma, the then-King of Travancore in Kollam district, Keralam. The palace was completed along with the commissioning of Quilon-Madras rail line. It is a single-storied, red-brick building with seven rooms. The architecture of Cheena Kottaram is Indo-Saracenic—generally a blend of Indian architecture, European, Islamic, and Moorish architecture. Cheena Kottaram is yet to get the 'National Heritage Monument' accreditation.

== Etymology ==
Kollamites called this rest house Cheena Kottaram (China Palace) because of its resemblance to the ancient Chinese buildings.

== History ==
Before the independence of India, the commercial capital of Travancore kingdom was Quilon (Kollam) - the city with the best business and commercial reputation in the Travancore-Malabar Coast, with high level of export-import operations through the flourishing Quilon Port. Kollam was known as Palace City that time as there were so many palaces in the city then. Quilon Aerodrome, serving the Travancore-Malabar Coast, was the only airport in Kollam city at that time. During that time, there was no rail-air connectivity to Thiruvananthapuram. Kings of Travancore used to travel from Kollam. Rail connections arrived with the construction of the Cheena Kottaram, close to the Quilon Junction railway station.
