= Kollam International Hockey Stadium =

Hockey stadium in Kollam, India

International Hockey Stadium, Kollam
- Synthetic Turf Hockey Stadium, Kollam
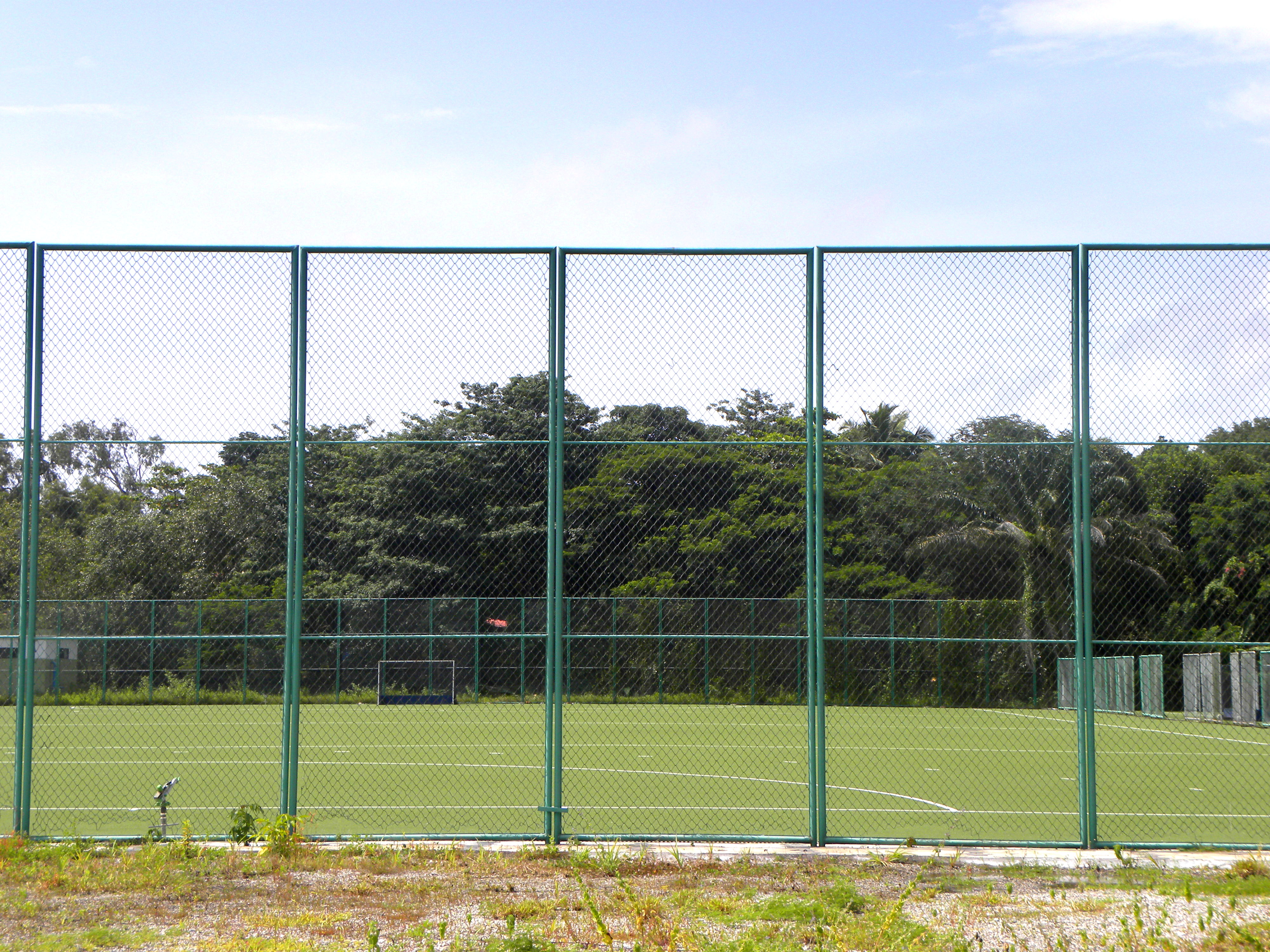

- Location of stadium in Kollam city International Hockey Stadium, Kollam (Kerala) International Hockey Stadium, Kollam (India)
- Full name: International Astro Turf Hockey Stadium and Sports Complex, Asramam, Kollam
- Location: Asramam, City of Kollam(Quilon)
- Coordinates: 8.894259°N 76.587831°E
- Owner: [Kerala State Sports Council, Trivandrum]
- Capacity: 3,000
- Surface: Synthetic Turf

Construction
- Opened: 27 January 2015
- Cost: Rs. 17.55 Crores (US$ 2.84 Million)
- Architect: C T Ramanathan Infrastructure Private Ltd.

The International Synthetic Turf Hockey Stadium is a hockey stadium situated at the city of Kollam, first of its kind in Kerala state, with a nominal capacity of around 5,000 seats.

The stadium is located at an area which was formerly known as Depot Maidan within the Asramam Government property complex, less than 700 meters from the Chinnakada traffic circle. The Depot Maidan lies on the way to the Yatri Nivas Hotel from Chinnakada and was serving as a timber depot of the Forest Department before.

The International Hockey Stadium in Kollam can host international hockey matches along the likes of New Delhi, Bangalore, Patiala and Ranchi. The stadium has picturesque surroundings with Ashtamudi Lake amidst much greenery. National Games Secretariat was overseeing the works of the stadium as part of National Games-2015.

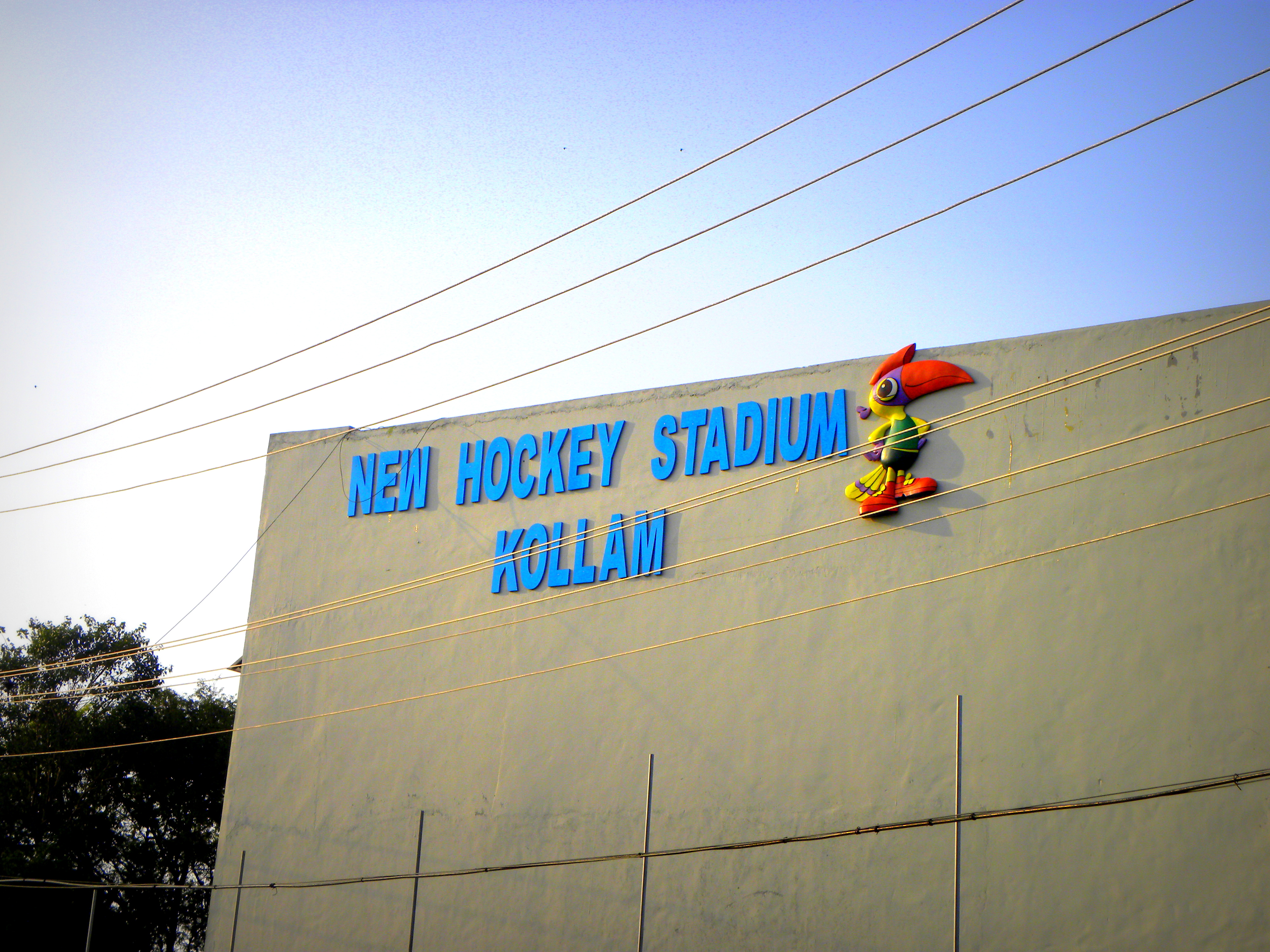
View of stadium building from outside

== History ==
National Games-2015 of India had been held on Kerala. As part of that, Government of Kerala have facilitated 29 venues in the state spread over Trivandrum, Kollam, Kochi, Thrissur, Kozhikode and Alappuzha cities. Kollam city and district are famous for their players and the passion for the game. So for supporting the city's passion towards hockey, Government of Kerala had decided to build a most modern astro turf hockey stadium within the city. Administrative sanction and construction works for the stadium has been started on 2005, in a 4.78 acres plot for a cost of Rs. 9 crores. M. Vijayakumar, the then Sports Minister of Kerala had laid the foundation stone for the stadium on 20 January 2005.

== Dimensions ==
- Total plot area - 1.86 Hectare
- Area of the stadium - 16,000 sqft
- Main Play area - 6,570 sqft
- Practicing area - 2,680 sqft

== Facilities ==
- VIP/VVIP Lounges
- Hockey Federation lounge
- Media work station
- AIR
- Television & announcement systems
- Medical Room
- Doping test facility
- Gymnasium
- Changing room
- Umpire room

== Kollam city as a venue of National Games-2015 ==
Kollam city became a part of 2015 National Games of India. Two main events, hockey and rugby sevens, had been held at two different stadiums in the city, Lal Bahadur Shastri Stadium and International Hockey Stadium. The International Hockey Stadium was named as Dhyan Chand Plaza during the time of National Games.
