= Kadappakada =

Kadappakada Kadappakkada
- Neighbourhood
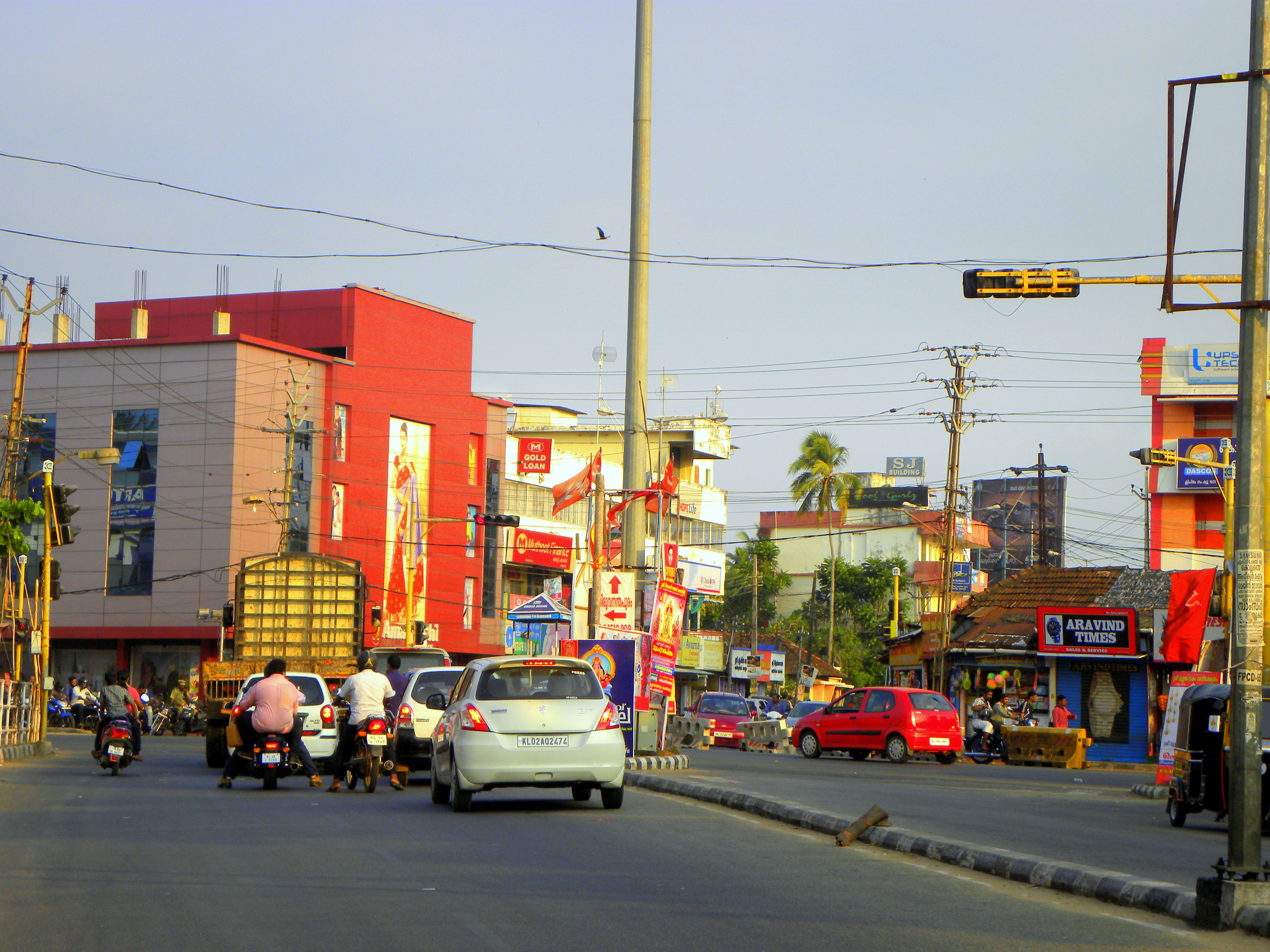
- Kadappakkada Junction, Kollam

- Location in Kollam, India Kadappakada (Kerala) Kadappakada (India)
- Coordinates: 8.892283°N 76.603591°E
- Country: India
- State: Kerala
- District: Kollam

Government
  - Body: Kollam Municipal Corporation (KMC)

Languages
  - Official: Malayalam, English
- Time zone: UTC+5:30 (IST)
- PIN: 691008
- Vehicle registration: KL-02
- Lok Sabha constituency: Kollam
- Civic agency: Kollam Municipal Corporation
- Avg. summer temperature: 34 °C (93 °F)
- Avg. winter temperature: 22 °C (72 °F)
- Website: http://www.kollam.nic.in

Kadappakada or Kadappakkada is a neighbourhood and important junction in the city of Kollam, in the state of Kerala, India. NH 744 (Earlier NH 208), that connects Kollam with Tirumangalam meets the Asramam Link Road at Kadappakada junction. Usually the authorities divert the traffic in National Highways through the Link road, if required.

== Proposals for facilities improvement ==
- As it is a major part of the city, the National Transportation Planning and Research Centre (NATPAC) has conducted a feasibility study on constructing a flyover or underpass at the Kadappakada junction in 2012.
- The Government of Kerala conducted an investment conference, Partner Kerala in Kochi in February 2014 where the Kollam Development Authority (KDA) submitted a proposal for Kadappakada junction improvement.
- As part of central government's "Urban 2020 project", approval has been given for the construction of a 14 metres (46 ft) wide two-lane flyover at a cost of Rs. 100 crore at Kadappakada.

== Public/Private institutions near Kadappakada ==
- SBT Zonal Office
- Hotel Sea Pearl
- Nandilath G-mart, Kollam
- Muthoot Mini Theatres DHANYA & REMYA
- Sankar's Institute of Medical Science(SIMS)
- Malayala Manorama
- Sports Club
- Janayugom Press
- The Central Park Hotel
- Nair's Hospital

== Gallery ==
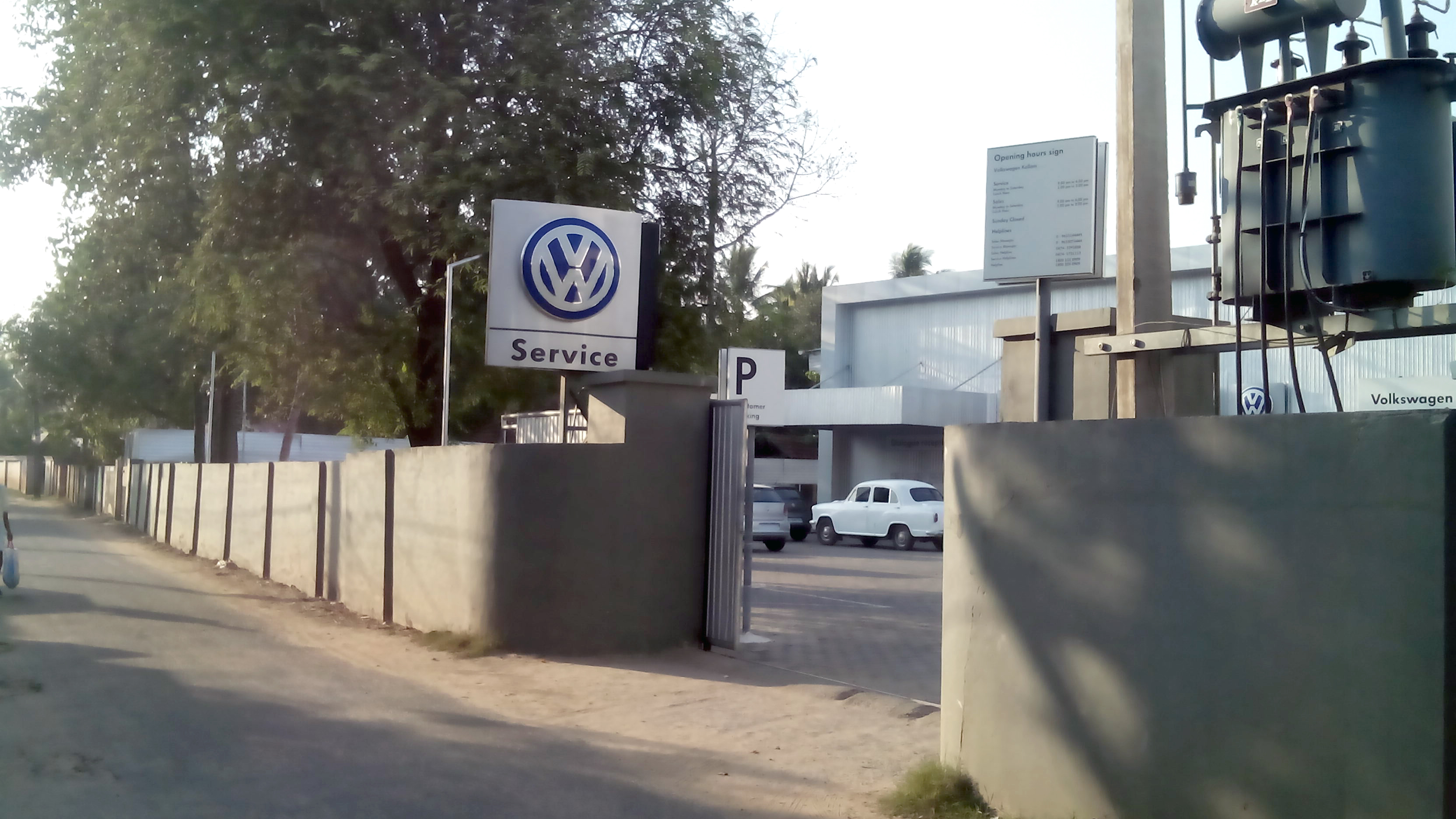
Volkswagen Service Centre near Kadappakada

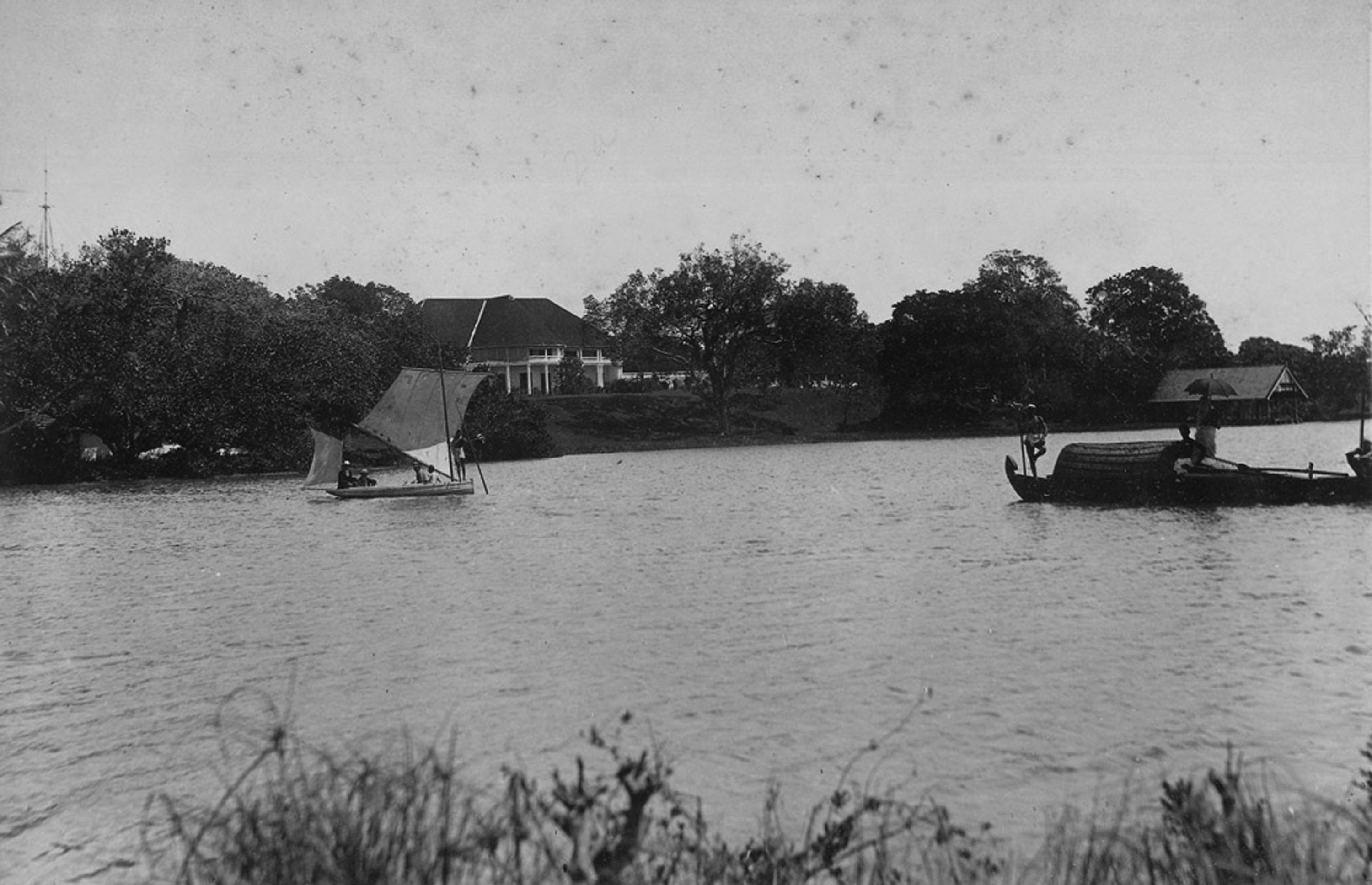
An old snap of British Residency in Kollam

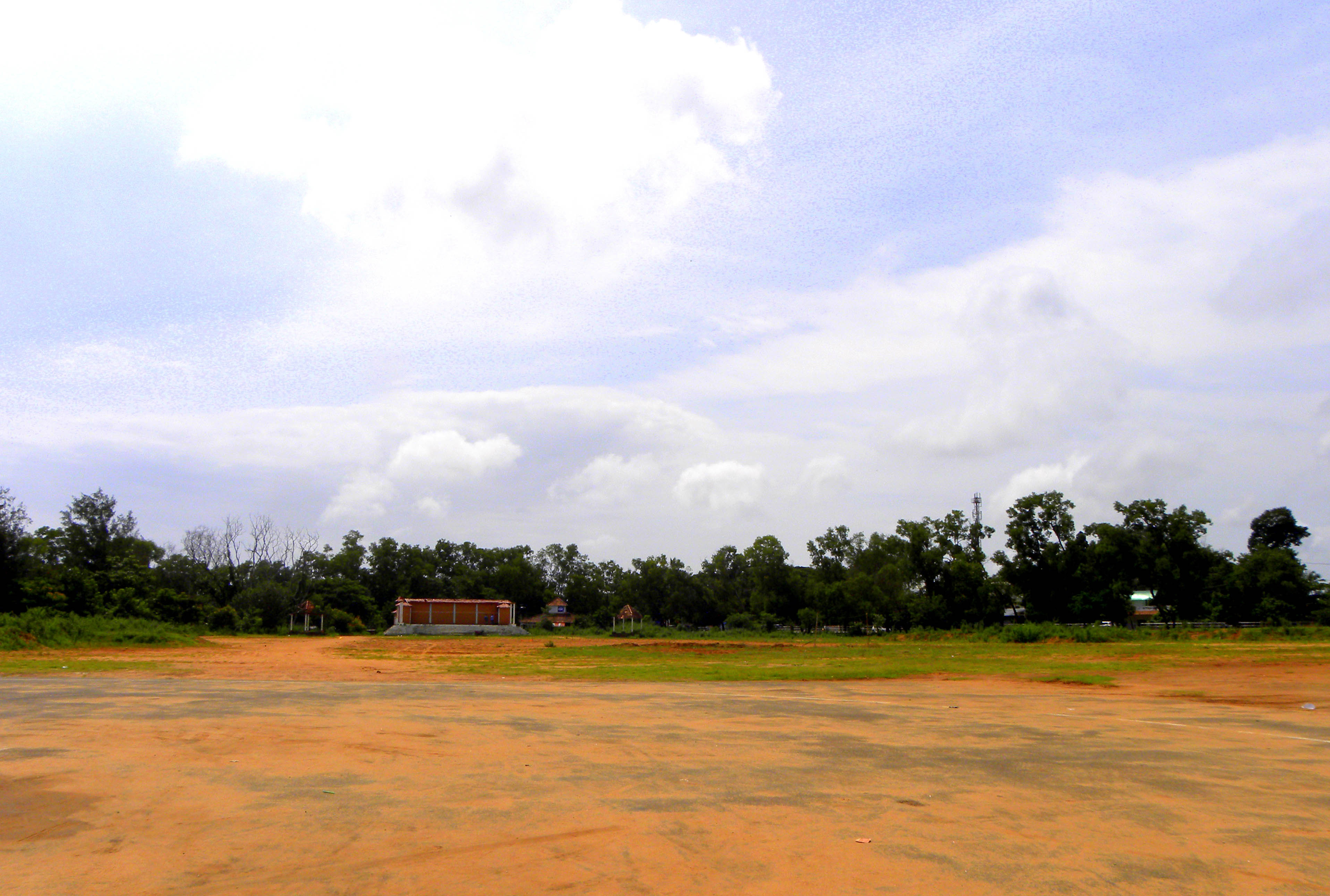
Asramam Maidan near Kadappakada

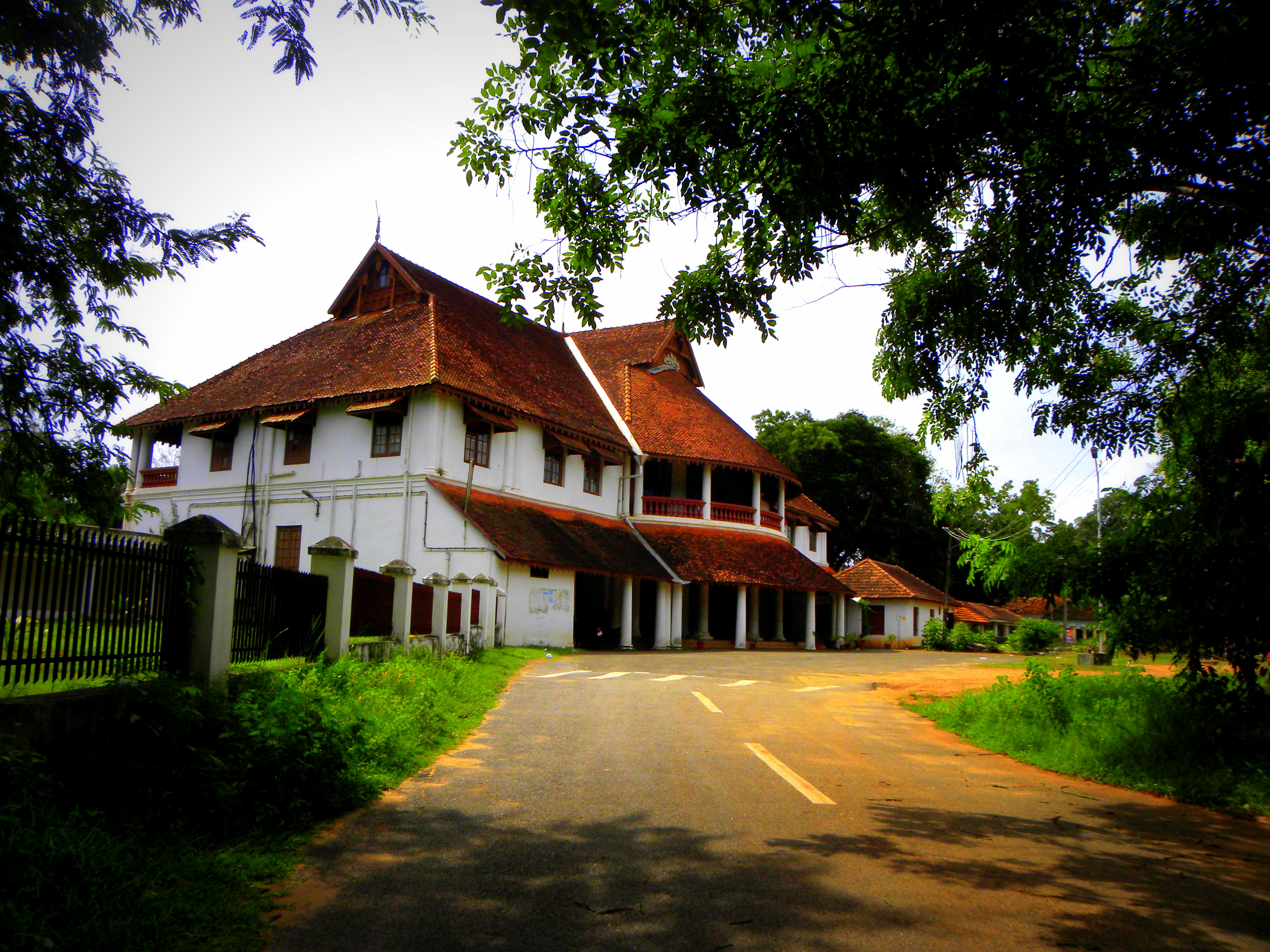
British Residency

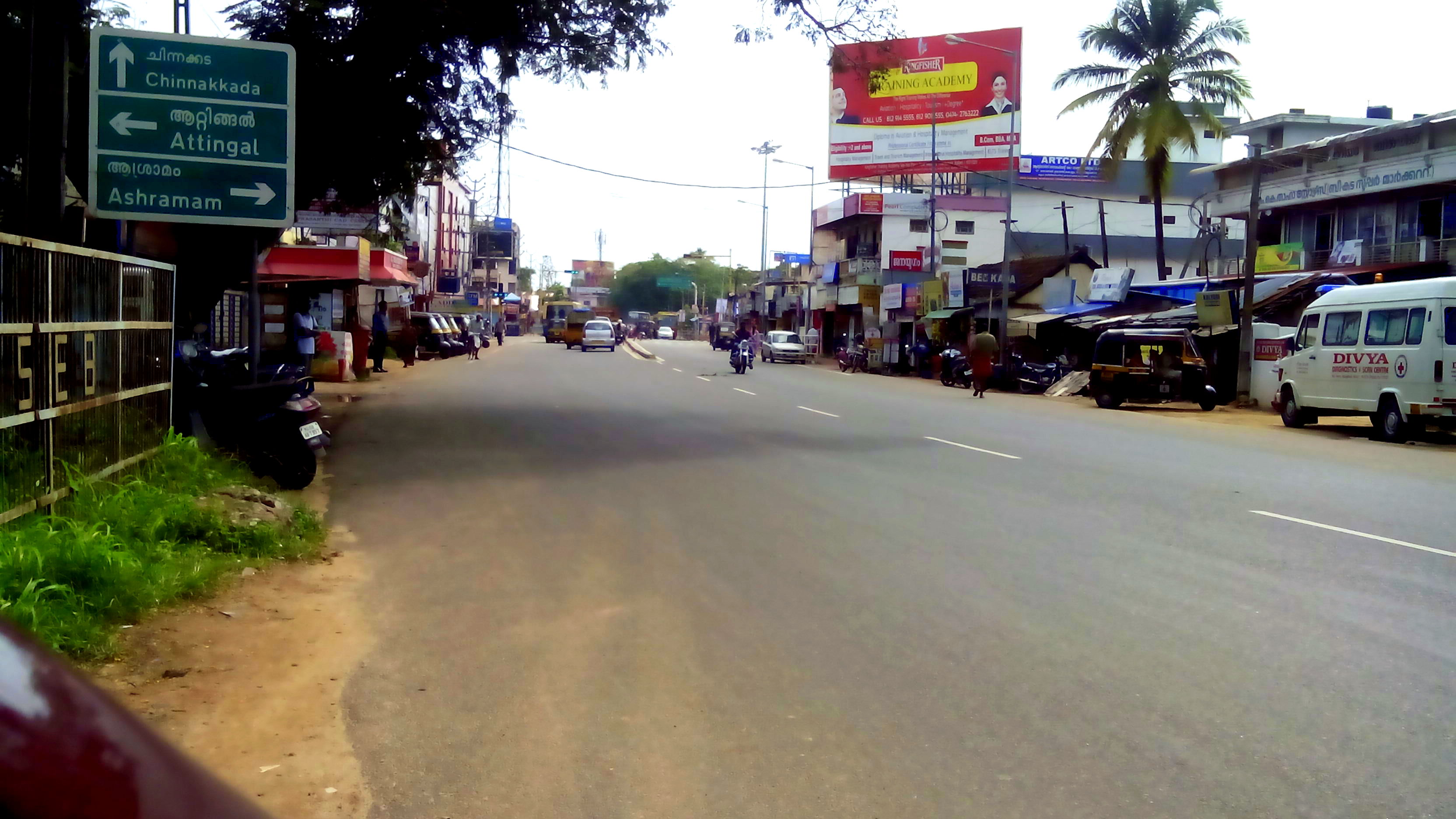
Kadappakada Junction

== See also ==
- Kollam
- Kollam Junction railway station
- Kollam KSRTC Bus Station
- Kollam district
- Kollam Port
- Kollam Beach
- Kollam Pooram
- Chinnakada
- Asramam Maidan
