= British Residency =

British Residency Government Guest House
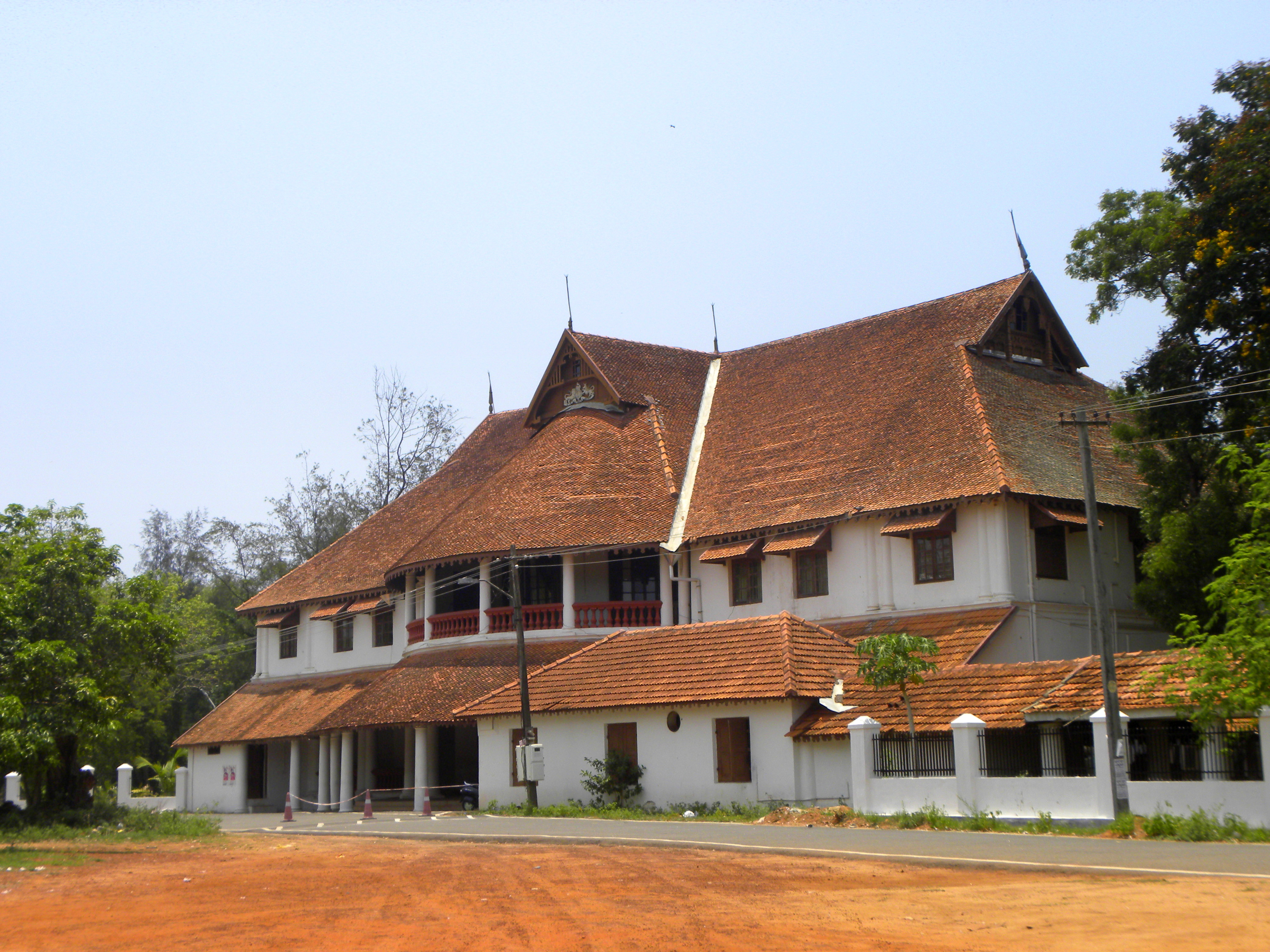
- British Residency in Asramam

- Location within Kollam Location within Kerala Location within India

General information
- Architectural style: European-Indian-Tuscan
- Location: Asramam, Kollam city, India
- Coordinates: 8.897906°N 76.586191°E
- Construction started: 1811
- Completed: 1819
- Client: Col. John Munro

Design and construction
- Engineer: Captain Arthur

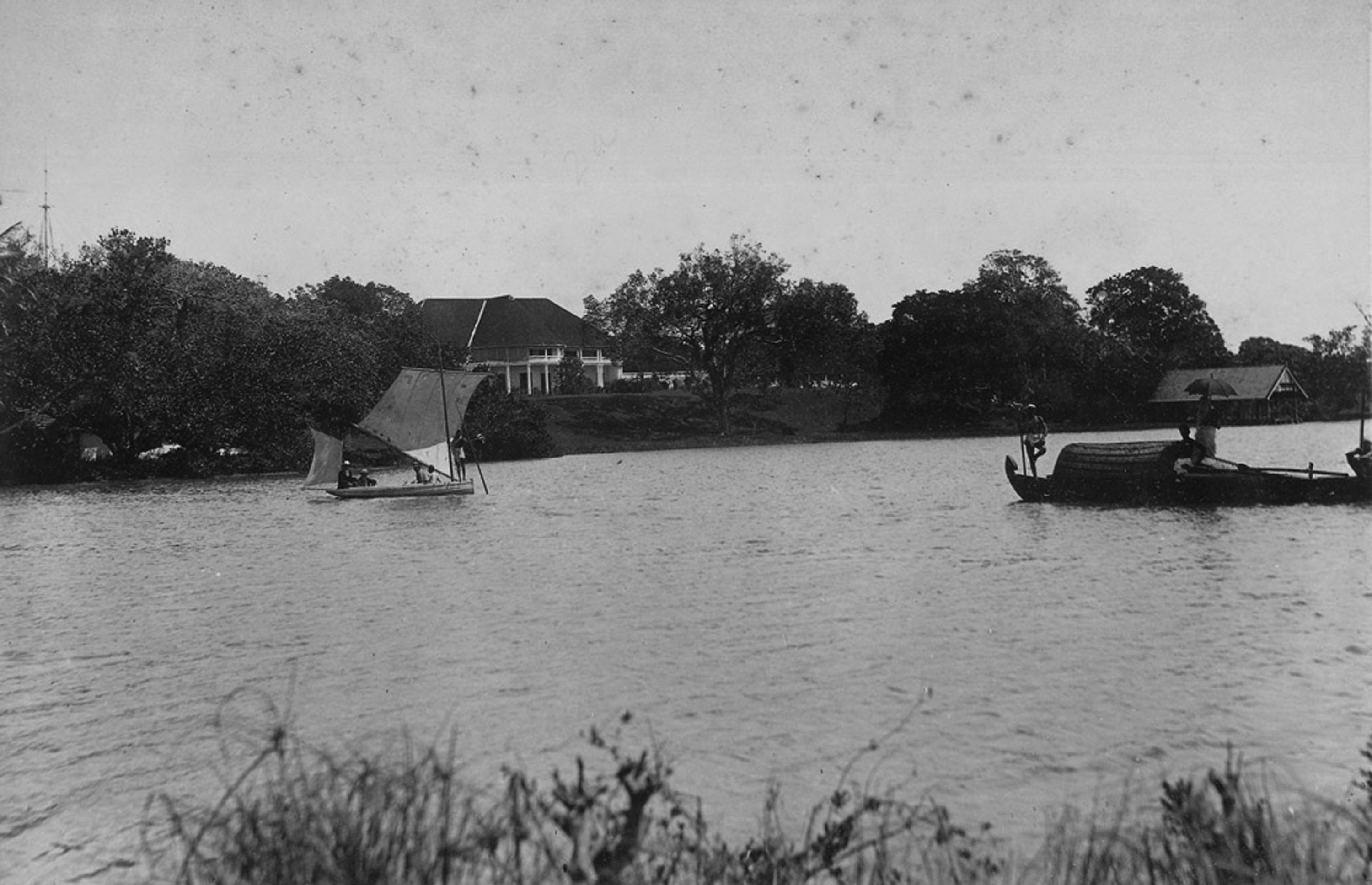
An old image of the British Residency

The British Residency, also known as the Government Guest House or Residency Bungalow, is a two-storeyed palace situated at Asramam in the city of Kollam in the Indian state of Kerala. It lies close to the site of the old Kollam Airport situated at Asramam in the city and was built by Colonel John Munro between 1811 and 1819. It is a noted Kollam landmark like the Chinnakada Clock Tower.

== Architecture and structure ==
The British residency vali unique symmetry and harmonious blending of variegated artistic features. During the British Raj, the building served as the British Residency. It was built during the Travancore era by Gowri Parvati Bayi when Colonel John Munro was the British Resident. A blend of European, Indian and Tuscan architecture, the central portion of the building has a rounded front, with a large gable decoration. Atop the building there is a crown with a lion seated on it, with the motto Dieu et mon Droit (God and my right) inscribed above. The 10 feet (3.0 m) entrance doors are made up of glass panes. The conference hall in the palace has an antechamber with an adjustable partition-like door while a large fanlight arching over divides the two rooms. The building has rich wooden flooring on the upper storey. The walls of the conference hall having cornices and dentils bordering the four sides with embossed designs of festoons, urns, and floral forms. A motif of a large arch with an ornamental keystone, resting on pillars is embossed over the main doorway. The Edward Rose garden is another main attraction of the mansion.

Antique prints in polished wooden frames adorn the walls including one that depicts the battle of Seringapatnam, dating from 1802. Prof. Pandala has described the Residency as "one of the most elegant buildings in India".

== See also ==
- Residencies of British India
- Thevally Palace
- Cheena Kottaram
- Chinnakada Clock Tower
- Architecture of Kerala
