= District Tourism Promotion Council =

District level tourism promotion body government in Kerala, India

District Tourism Promotion Councils
- ജില്ലാ ടൂറിസം പ്രൊമോഷൻ കൗൺസിൽ
- Official logo of DTPC Kerala

Agency overview
- Jurisdiction: Kerala, India
- Headquarters: One in each of the 14 districts of Kerala
- Minister responsible: P. A. Mohamed Riyas, Minister of Tourism, Government of Kerala
- Agency executive: District Collector (per district), Chairman (per DTPC)
- Parent agency: Department of Tourism, Government of Kerala
- Website: www.keralatourism.org/dtpc/

District Tourism Promotion Councils (DTPC); Malayalam: (ജില്ലാ ടൂറിസം പ്രൊമോഷൻ കൗൺസിൽ, romanized: Jillā Ṭūrisaṃ Promoṣan Kauṇsil; [dʒillaː ʈuːɾisaṃ pɾomoʂan kɐuɳsil]) are district-level government-constituted trusts that function as scheduled offices of the Department of Tourism, Government of Kerala. A separate council is established in each of the 14 districts of Kerala, India. Each council is chaired by the District Collector of the respective district and is mandated to coordinate tourism-related activities at the district level in conjunction with government departments, voluntary organisations, local self-government bodies, and private sector entities.

Each DTPC maintains a district-specific tourism information office and acts as an implementing agency for tourism infrastructure projects funded by the state Department of Tourism. The councils also operate guided tours and are involved in implementing responsible tourism initiatives at designated destinations.

== Background ==
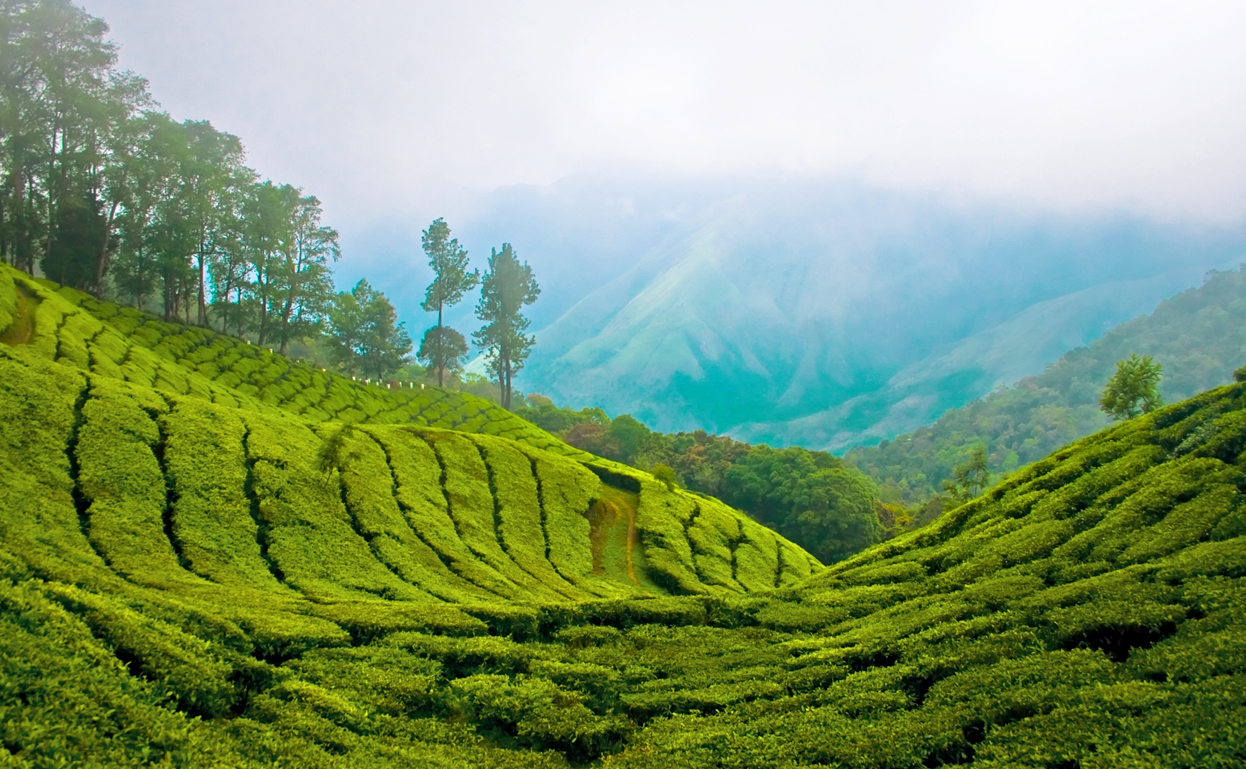
Highest tea plantations in India. Munnar, Kerala

Kerala was the first Indian state to declare tourism as an industry, through a government order dated 11 July 1986. The state's expenditure on tourism as a percentage of total state expenditure has consistently exceeded the national average, which stood at 0.49 per cent; Kerala's proportion was recorded at 1.27 per cent.

The Department of Tourism (Kerala) traces its institutional origins to the State Guest Department of the erstwhile Travancore State, which had been functioning since 1930, and the Hospitality Organisation of the Cochin State. Following the formation of Kerala State in 1956, the two organisations were merged as the Tourist Department in 1958. The department was renamed the Department of Tourism in 1981. Infrastructure development in the tourism sector has been carried out through public sector undertakings including the Kerala Tourism Development Corporation (KTDC), Kerala Tourism Infrastructure Ltd (KTIL), and the Bekal Resorts Development Corporation Ltd (BRDC), alongside the DTPCs at the district level.

== History ==
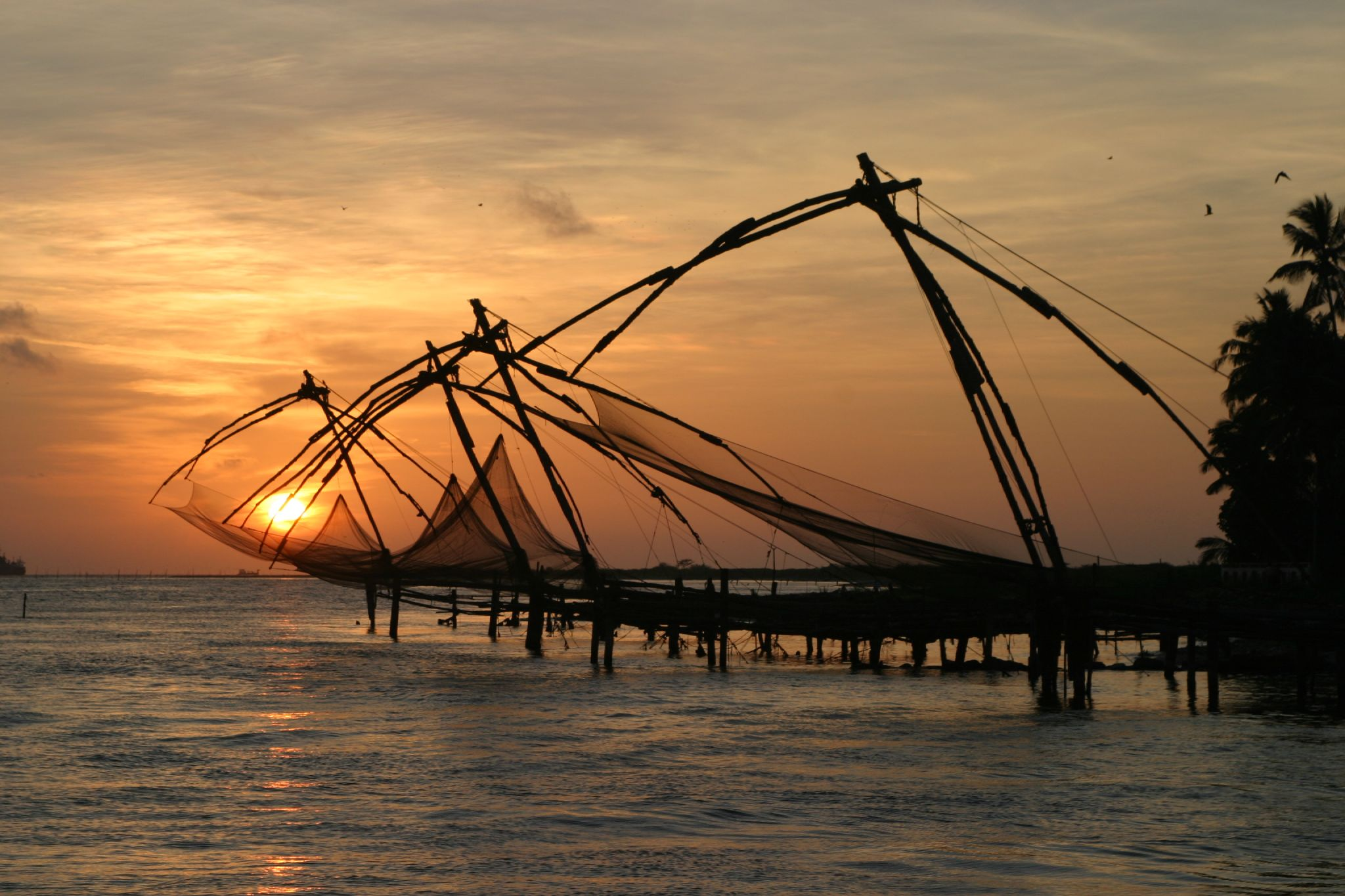
Chinese Fishing Nets (Cochin) Kochi

The District Tourism Promotion Councils were constituted as government-formed trusts and designated as scheduled offices under the Department of Tourism, Government of Kerala, to coordinate tourism administration at the district level.

Kerala's first tourism policy, announced in 1995, established a framework for public–private partnership in tourism development and defined the state's role as a facilitator rather than a direct provider. The Kerala Tourism Policy 2002 and the Kerala Tourism Policy 2012 subsequently formalised the position of DTPCs within the state's tourism governance structure. The 2012 Policy listed DTPCs alongside KTDC, KTIL, BRDC, and Destination Management Committees as implementing agencies for tourism infrastructure and development schemes under the state's annual plans.

A committee appointed by the Government of Kerala in 2005 reviewed DTPC operations and recorded that the councils were functioning ineffectively in assisting travellers, with additional concern expressed over the condition of tourism properties in certain districts. Following the review, a coordination mechanism headed by the Chief Secretary was established through Government Order G.O. (MS) No. 05/05/GAD dated 3 January 2005, to monitor the activities of departments engaged in tourism project implementation.

State government allocations to DTPCs increased from ₹200 lakh in 2007–08 to ₹550 lakh in 2014–15.

== Organisation and structure ==
Each District Tourism Promotion Council is governed by a body comprising the following categories of members:

- Chairman: The District Collector of the respective district serves as ex-officio Chairman of the governing body.
- Members: Officers from relevant government departments, elected people's representatives, and tourism professionals nominated by the Government of Kerala.
- Secretary: A senior officer of the Department of Tourism deputed to the district, responsible for day-to-day administration.

The councils operate in coordination with the Deputy Director of Tourism at the district level, who heads the Department of Tourism's separate district office.

== Functions ==
According to the Department of Tourism, Government of Kerala, the DTPCs are responsible for the following functions:

=== Tourist information ===
Each DTPC maintains an information office that provides details of tourist destinations, festival schedules, routes, transportation options, and accommodation facilities within the district.

=== Infrastructure project implementation ===
DTPCs act as implementing agencies for tourism infrastructure projects sanctioned by the state Department of Tourism, including wayside amenities, signage, visitor facilities, and basic infrastructure at tourist destinations.

=== Local product and event coordination ===
The councils are involved in coordinating the marketing of locally produced goods such as handicrafts and traditional food products, supporting quality certification processes, and publicising regional cultural events and festivals.

=== Guided tours ===
DTPCs organise district-level guided tours covering tourist destinations, heritage sites, and other attractions within their respective jurisdictions.

=== Responsible Tourism implementation ===
The DTPCs coordinate with the Kerala Responsible Tourism Mission and Destination Level Responsible Tourism Committees (DLRTC) in implementing community-based and ecologically sustainable tourism practices at designated destinations, including linkages with Kudumbashree self-help groups.

== Relationship with other tourism bodies ==
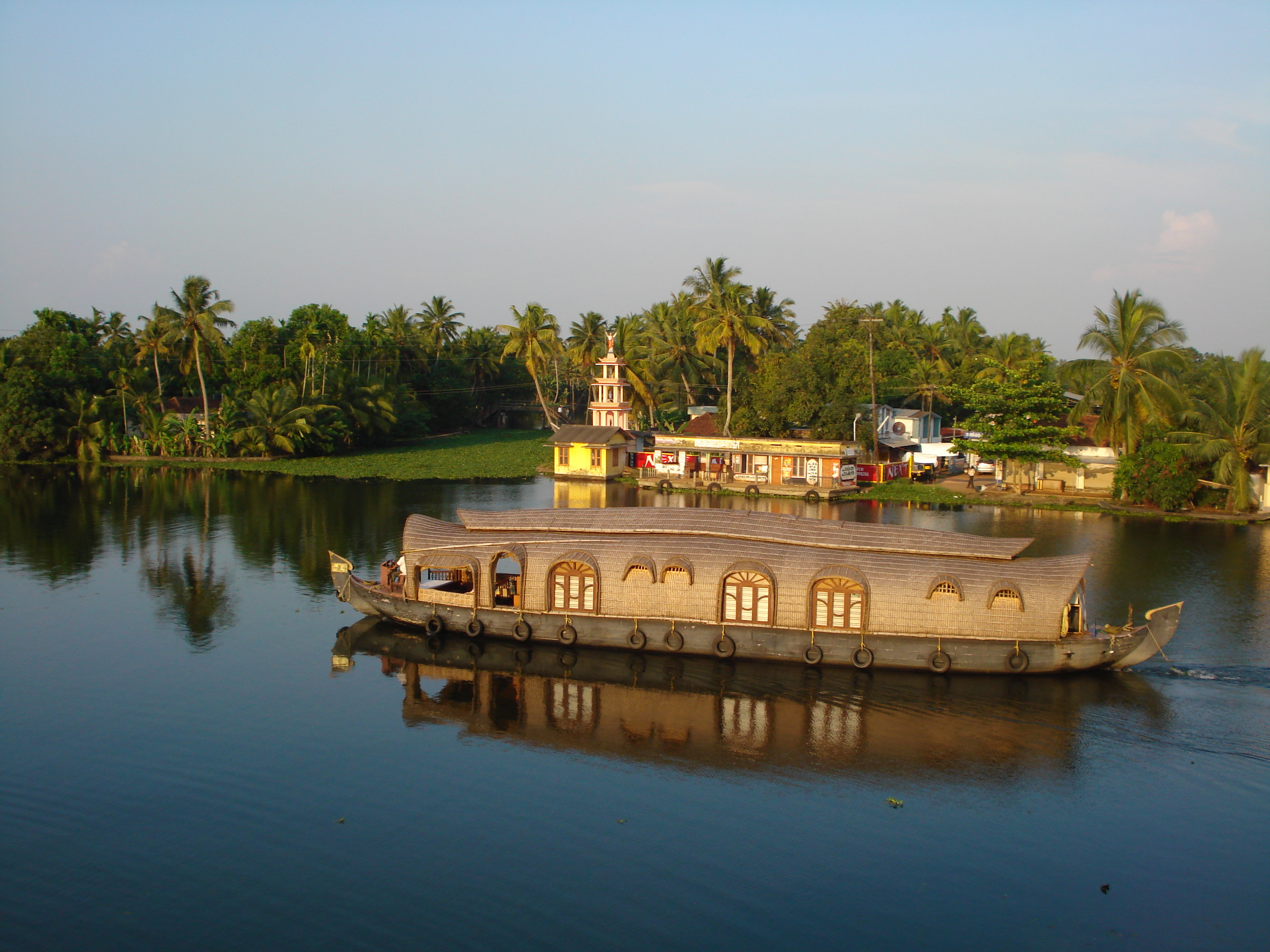
Houseboat in Nedumudi, Kuttanad, Kerala, India

The DTPCs are one of several bodies through which the Government of Kerala administers and develops tourism. The broader institutional framework includes the following agencies:

- Department of Tourism, Government of Kerala: The state government body with overall responsibility for tourism policy, planning, and development, under which the DTPCs operate as scheduled offices.
- Kerala Tourism Development Corporation (KTDC): A state public sector undertaking that operates hotels, motels, and tourist rest houses. Unlike the DTPCs, KTDC functions as a commercial hospitality entity.
- Kerala Tourism Infrastructure Ltd (KTIL): A state government company responsible for tourism infrastructure development projects, which shares implementation responsibilities with DTPCs at the district level.
- Bekal Resorts Development Corporation Ltd (BRDC): A state agency with a mandate specific to the Bekal tourism zone in Kasaragod district.
- Kerala Responsible Tourism Mission: The state-designated nodal agency for implementing responsible tourism programmes statewide, with which DTPCs coordinate at the destination level.
- State Tourism Advisory Committee (STAC): An advisory body constituted under the Kerala Tourism Policy 2012 to advise the state government on tourism matters.

== Assessment ==
A 2018 policy report by the Centre for Public Policy Research, Kochi, noted that the DTPCs are designated as the primary sources of district-level tourist information and are tasked with implementing state-funded tourism projects. However, the report also noted that a government-appointed committee in 2005 had recorded that the councils were operating ineffectively and that tourism properties under their purview were inadequately maintained. The report further noted that stakeholder interviews and survey-based studies indicated tourists relied predominantly on private travel platforms rather than DTPC information resources.

State allocations to DTPCs have nevertheless increased over successive financial years, from ₹200 lakh in 2007–08 to ₹550 lakh in 2014–15, and DTPCs continue to be listed as implementing agencies under the state's annual tourism plans.

== See also ==
- Department of Tourism (Kerala)
- Tourism in Kerala
- Kerala Tourism Development Corporation
- Responsible Tourism
