= Quilon Aerodrome =

Quilon Aerodrome കൊല്ലം വിമാനനിലയം
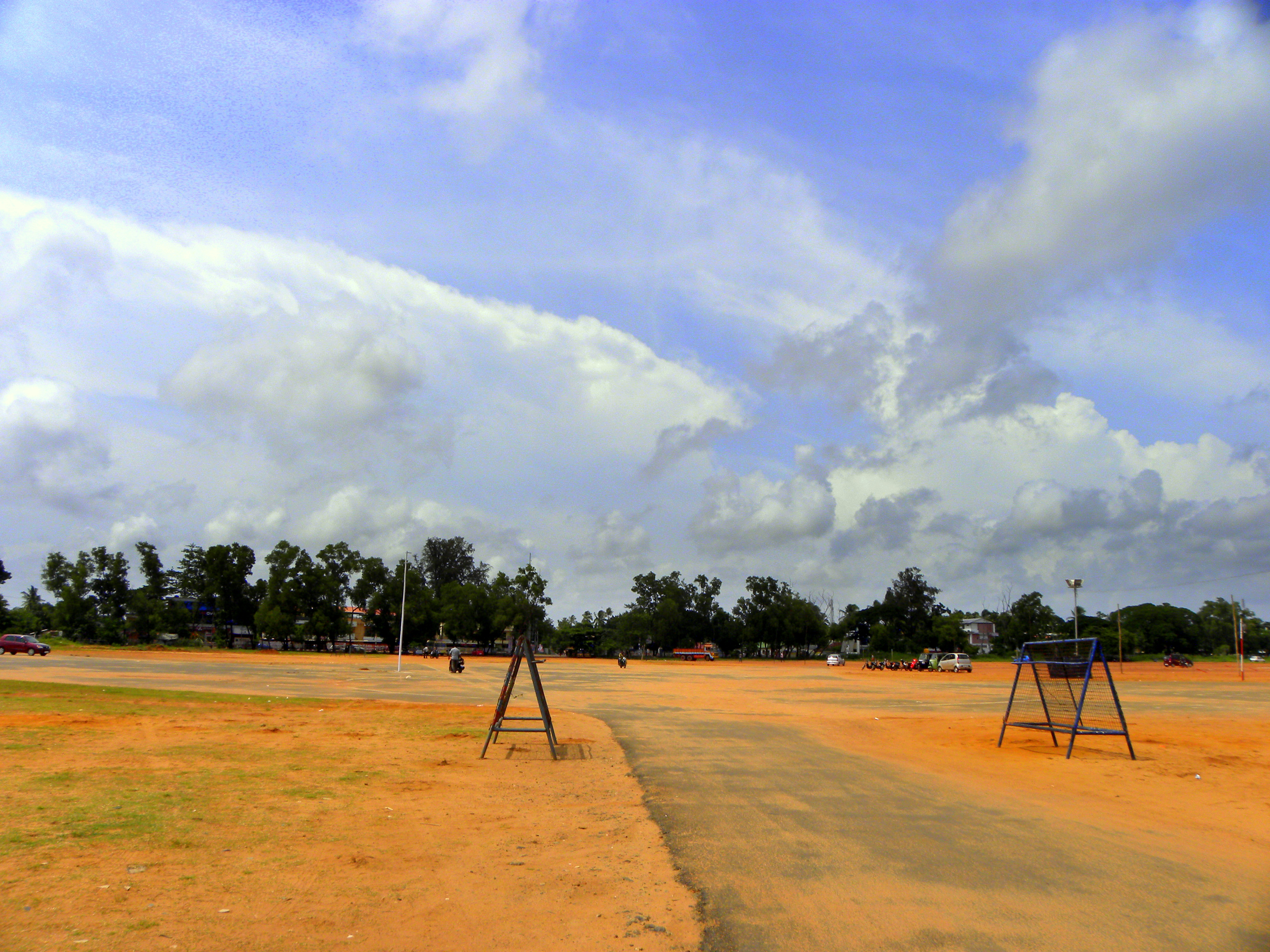
- IATA: none; ICAO: none

Summary
- Airport type: Public
- Owner: Madras Presidency (until 1932)
- Operator: Kerala Public Works Department (PWD)
- Serves: Kollam (Quilon)
- Location: Asramam, Kollam
- Closed: 1932
- Time zone: IST (UTC+05:30)
- Coordinates: 8.894°N 76.593°E

Map
- Location in Kollam, India Kollam Aerodrome (defunct) (Kerala) Kollam Aerodrome (defunct) (Kollam)

Quilon Aerodrome or Kollam Airport was an aerodrome in the city of Kollam in the former state of Travancore, now in Kerala, India. During the 1920s, there were no other civil aerodromes in the kingdoms of Cochin, Travancore and the Malabar District at the time of the British ruled Madras Presidency. With the commissioning of Trivandrum International Airport in 1932 at state capital 57 kilometres (35 mi) to the south, the aerodrome fell into disuse and came to be known as the Asramam Maidan.

The landing strip of the aerodrome was strengthened with red laterite soil from the adjoining hills because the local loose soil was unsuitable for the purpose. There were no buildings in the aerodrome, but a circular concrete pad for parking aircraft was built. The aerodrome was under the control of the Public Works Department (PWD). The aerodrome was also used for training operations. These were stopped when an accident involving a training aircraft at the boundary of the aerodrome resulted in the death of the pilot and the trainee.

== Proposal for an aviation academy at old airport ==
From 2009 to 2012, local authorities made plans to revive the aerodrome for a flying academy with a 4,000 foot runway for light aircraft. However, since the site was surrounded by several high-rising structures like buildings and cell phone towers and the proposal met with objections from the local population, the plans were discarded.

== Revival of airstrip plans ==
The Government of Kerala started plans to set up ten airstrips in Kerala including one at Asramam Old Airport area. In February 2020, the state government submitted a feasibility study report to the Civil Aviation Ministry of India in this regard.

== See also ==
- List of airports in India
- List of airports in Kerala state
