= Oachira Gram Panchayat =

Gram Panchayat in Kollam district of Kerala, India

Oachira Grama Panchayat is a gram panchayat located in Karunagappally taluk, Kollam district, Kerala, India. The panchayat was established in 1953.

== History ==
Centuries before the Proclamation of Temple entry, Ochira was the only place in Hinduism where worship was open to all, irrespective of caste or creed. Oachira is popular^{[says who?]} in tourism due to the centuries-old Oachira Temple. According to historians^{[again, who?]}, Oachira was an important Buddhist monastery. Buddhist civilization in and around Oachira, as well as the multitude of place-names ending in pally, lend credence to the theory. The Oachirakali, which is performed annually by combining the strength and beauty of martial arts, is considered as a renewal of some historical tradition.

== Geography ==
Oachira Panchayat is relatively unelevated, lying 3.05 meters, or 10.6 feet above sea level. The region is situated by the coast, which constitutes a significant part of the physiography of Kerala. Common geographic features of this region are sand ridges and plains, with sand ridges taking up almost 75% of the total area.

Mainly two types of soils are found in Oachira: sandy loam, which is found in sand ridges, and alluvial soil, deposited by rivers, and are commonly seen in the planes.

To the north, Oachira borders Krishanpuram and the Devikulangara Panchayats. To the west, it borders Klappana. To the east, it borders Thazhava and Kulashekharapuram, and to the east, it borders Vallikunnam.

== Climate ==
Oachira panchayat is a common recipient of monsoons. It receives an average of 2564 mm, or 100.9 in of rainfall annually. The tempurate reaches its highest in March and April, with yearly lows occurring around December and January.

== Education ==
Beyond Thiruvananthapuram, the only school in Travancore that taught Sanskrit and Ayurveda concurrently was situated in Changankulangara, in Ochira. Up until the 1950s, Panchayat students relied on Kayamkulam High School and Karunagapally High School. High school education was formally started in the general region of Oachira in 1957. By the 1970s, private high schools began opening in the area.

== Agriculture ==
Ochira panchayat largely relies on agriculture as its main commercial product and export. Common crops farmed on the land include coconut and the areca nut. Other than those, several crops like banana, pepper, tapioca, colocasia, ginger, and betel leaves are also cultivated. In the past, as much as 51% of the total land area in Oachira were dedicated paddy fields. That figure has now been reduced to 9.3%. Coconut is now cultivated in about 83% of the total area.

== Industry ==
There are no significant business ventures in Oachira, Although there is one industrial unit of five engineering workshops, six humidifiers, two ice plants, and one industrial unit for aluminum containers, soap, packing cases, dairy products, and electronics. Many women who are employed in Oachira work in factories that focus on cashew farming.

== Culture ==
Thousands of devotees visit the Parabrahma Temple every year. Oachirakali is also a commonly repeated tradition.

== Wards ==
Oachira panchayat consists of 16 Wards.

No	Name of ward
1	Payikkuzhi
2	Oachira
3	North Memana
4	South Memana
5	Vayanakam
6	Njakkanal
7	Mathathikarazhma Vadakku
8	Mathathikarazhma thekku
9	Kottamballi
10	West Vayanakam
11	Chagankulangara north
12	Changankulangara
13	Changankulangara south
14	Changankulangara west
15	Valiyakulangar north
16	Valiyakulangara

== See also ==
- Oachira
- Oachira Temple
