= Religion in Kollam District =

Major religions and places of worship

Hinduism, Islam and Christianity are the prominent religions in Kollam district. As per the Census 2011, out of the total population of 2,635,375 persons, 64.42% follow Hinduism, 19.30% follow Islam and 16.00% follow Christianity. Other religions comprise 0.04%, while 0.25% did not state any religion.

== Hindu worship ==
Hindus form a majority i.e. 64.42% of the population of Kollam district.

As per a 2014 study by Centre for Development Studies of the total population of Hindus in the district, 32% are Nairs, 30.5% are Ezhavas, 16.9% are Dalit and 7.7% Vishwakarmas.

=== Oachira Temple ===
Oachira, located in the northern end of Kollam on National Highway 47, is famous for the Oachira Parabrahma Temple. Oachirakali is a special annual event at the padanilam (paddy fields) in the month of Vrichikam. Oachira Town Masjid (mosque) and the Oachira temple are situated close to one another and are a proud symbol of communal harmony. This temple is also a Sabarimala edathavalam. Gopuram, East Nada, West Nada, Ondikkavu, Ayyappa Temple, Mahalakshmi Temple and Ganapathi temple are important points of worship in this temple. Oachira temple is very different in the kind of offerings given to the deities. Theerthakkulam(Sacred pond) is another famous location where devotees take the sacred bath(dip).

=== Kottarakkara Maha Ganapathi Temple ===
The Mahaganapathi(Ganesha) Temple at Kottarakara, famous for its Unniappom, is one of the most venerated Ganesha temples in Kerala.The major vazhipadu(offerings) of Kottarakkara temple is the famous Udayasthamaya pooja. The main deity of this temple is lord Shiva, but Ganesha became famous and is now a Ganesha temple.

=== Asramam Sreekrishna Swamy Temple ===
Asramam Sreekrishna Swamy Temple on the shores of Ashtamudi Lake is one of the most prominent temples in Kollam. The main deity is Krishna, depicted as a boy with butter in both palms. The annual Kollam Pooram or festival is held at the adjacent Asramam Maidan.

=== Paravur Puttingal Devi Temple ===
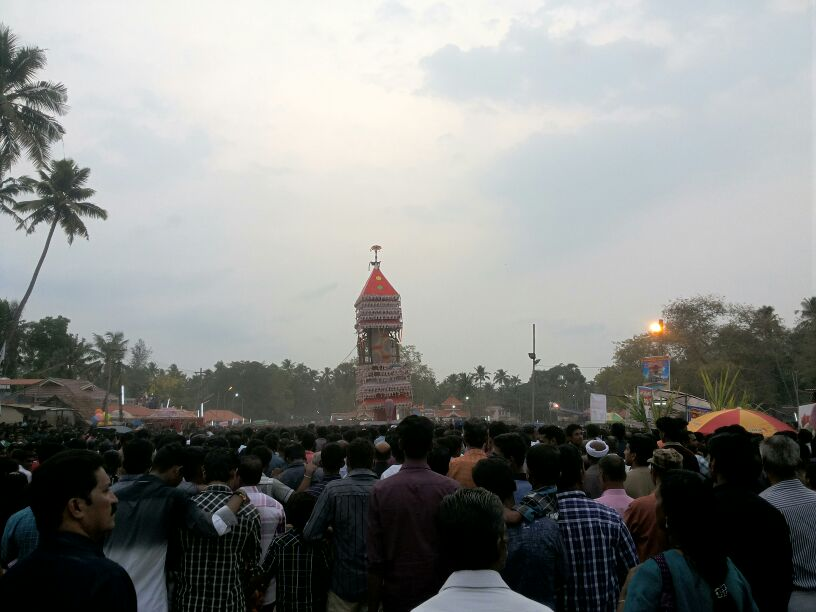
Puttingal Meenabharani Maholsavam, Paravur

Paravur Puttingal Temple is situated in Paravur municipal area. Puttingal Meenabharani Maholsavam is a Temple Festival usually held on the 2nd day of the 2nd month(Meenam) of Malayalam Calendar(March–April). This temple is very famous for the fireworks competition (Malsara Kambam) which is usually held on the final day of festival. The 2016 fireworks accident led to the death of over 100 devotees.

=== Ammachiveedu Temple ===
Ammachiveedu Temple is situated in the town area. It was established by an aristocratic family called Ammachi Veedu (Ammachi home). The annual festival falls on Dhanu of every year but it is to be done after the Mandala Pooja.

=== Umayanalloor Sri Balasubramanya Swami Kshethram ===
Umayanalloor Sri Balasubramanya Swami Temple (Murugan) is situated at Umayanalloor, near the NH-47, about 8 km from Kollam town. One of another name of Lord Subramanyan(Murugan) is Umayan, that's why the land of Umayan(Subramanyan) has been called Umayanalloor. The important feature if this temple is that the Idol faces the western direction. One of the famous name associated with this temple is Adi Shankara. The temple is visited by thousands of devotees. Aanavaalpidi or 'Aana Vaal Pidutham Mahotsavam during the Malayalam calendar 'Meenam'[mid-March], attracts hundreds of devotees. Devotees run after an elephant and catch its tail, symbolising the childhood pranks between the deities Subramanyan (another names Murugan, Karthikeyan) and Ganesha. 'Thaipuyyam' is also celebrated in a big way. The lore is that the temple was built by the powerful lady ruler 'Umayammarani' of Venad Kingdom about 500 years ago. Administration of this Temple comes under Travancore Devaswom Board. "Nedumkuthira Eduppu" or Kuthira Eduppu" also performs during the last day of festival time in umayanallor Ela. Chira like water reservoirs of Umayanalloor Ela (paddy field) are Umayanalloor Ambala Chira, Umayanalloor Kovur Chira with too many ponds situating surroundings of Umayanalloor Ela.

=== Other Temples ===
The Anchal Agasthyakode Mahadeva Temple is another major Mahadeva temple in the Kollam district. It is situated in Anchal Panchayath. Every year during Sivarathri, people from every caste and religious background comes for the religious festivities.The Temple has been reconstructed recently and right now is having a new traditional look. The Temple is situated at around 2.5 km from Anchal Town, which is the Second Fastest Developing town in Kerala. www.agastyacodemahadevar.org s.

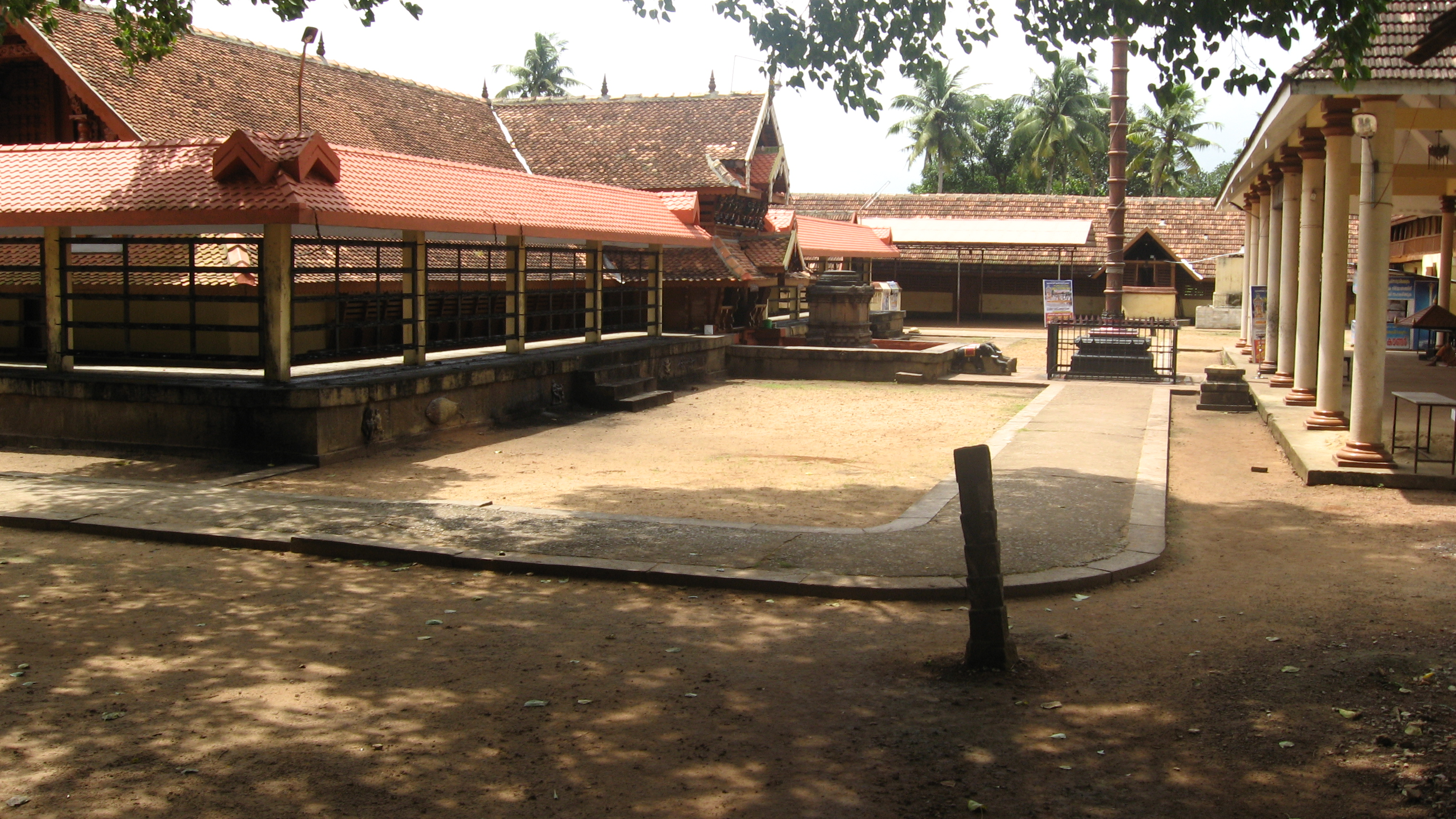
Mukathala Murari(SreeKrishna)Temple

The Mukhathala Murari (Sree Krishna Swamy) Temple at Mukhathala is about 10 km from the Kollam city.

The Thrikkadavoor Mahadeva Temple is the most famous Siva Temple in Kollam District. It is situated in the Thrikkadavoor Panchayath and on the banks of the Ashtamudi lake. The annual Srattu festival attracts thousands of people, including foreigners. The festival falls in the month of Kumbham (February). The eight artificial horses, which represent the eight areas (karas) around the temple, is a special attraction for tourists.

Kolloorvila Bharanikkavu Devi temple is located in madannada is on National Highway 47, annual festival spans for 41 days. The annual festival is on bharani nakshatra of meenam month according to Malayalam calendar, kollavarsham.

The Veerabhadra Swamy Temple at Ashtamudi in Kollam is the only temple in the southern part of the country with Veerabhadra as the presiding deity. This belongs to Kuttiyazhikam, Karuva, a two hundred & fifty-year-old Ezhava Family.

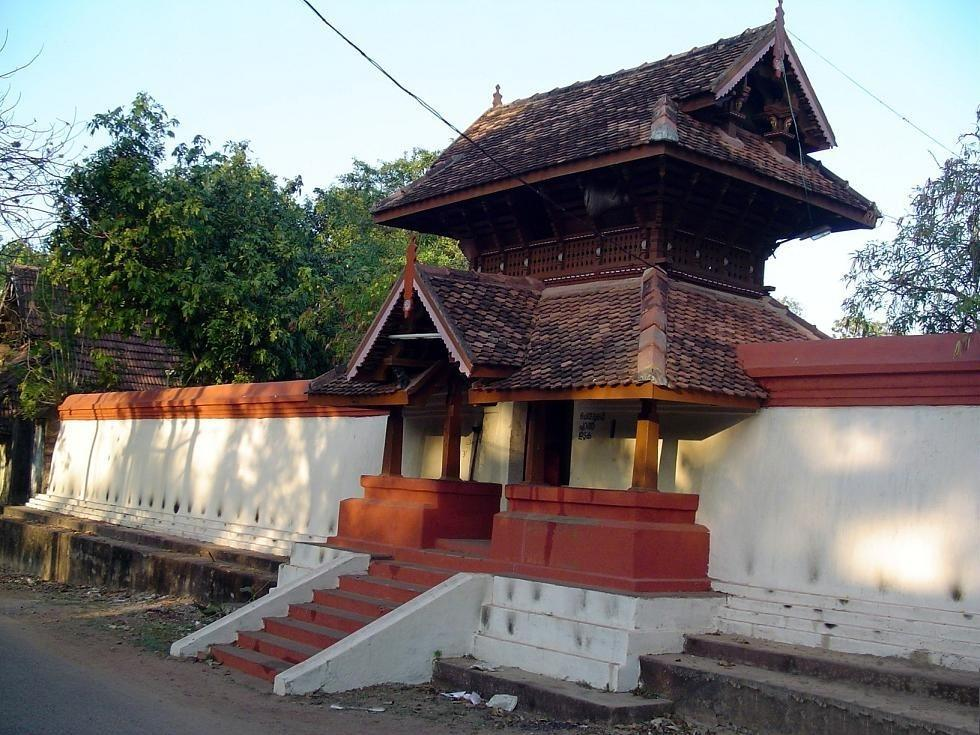
Gateway to a temple at Kollam

Umayanalloor Sri Balasubramanya Swami Temple (Murugan) is situated on the NH-47, about 8 km from Kollam town. One of another name of Lord Subramanyan(Murugan) is Umayan, that's why the land of Umayan(Subramanyan) has been called Umayanalloor. The important feature if this temple is that the Idol faces the western direction. One of the famous name associated with this temple is Adi Shankara. The temple is visited by thousands of devotees. Aanavaalpidi or 'Aana Vaal Pidutham' Mahotsavam during the Malayalam calendar 'Meenam'[mid-March], attracts hundreds of devotees from all over the state. Devotees run after an elephant and catch its tail, symbolising the childhood pranks between the deities Subramanyan (another names Murugan, Karthikeyan) and Ganesha."Nedumkuthira Eduppu" or Kuthira Eduppu" also performs during the last day of festival time. 'Thaipuyyam' is also celebrated in a big way. The lore is that the temple was built by the powerful lady ruler 'Umayammarani' of Venad Kingdom about 500 years ago. Administration of this Temple comes under Travancore Devaswom Board.

Aryankavu in the Western Ghats is the easternmost point in the district on the National Highway. One of the five ancient Ayyappa temples is situated here; two others are at Achankovil and Kulathupuzha in the district.

Shri Mahadevar Temple, Padinjattinkara, Sree Bhootha Natha Temple, Kulashekharanallor Srikrishnaswami and Devi temple, Kottarakara, Chennamath Temple and chathannoorsree bhoodhanatha temple and Vilappuram Bhagavathy Temple Chathannoor are famous temples. Polachira is a beautiful place near Vilappuram Temple and Anathavalam (elephants shelter) at Chirakkara is also there.

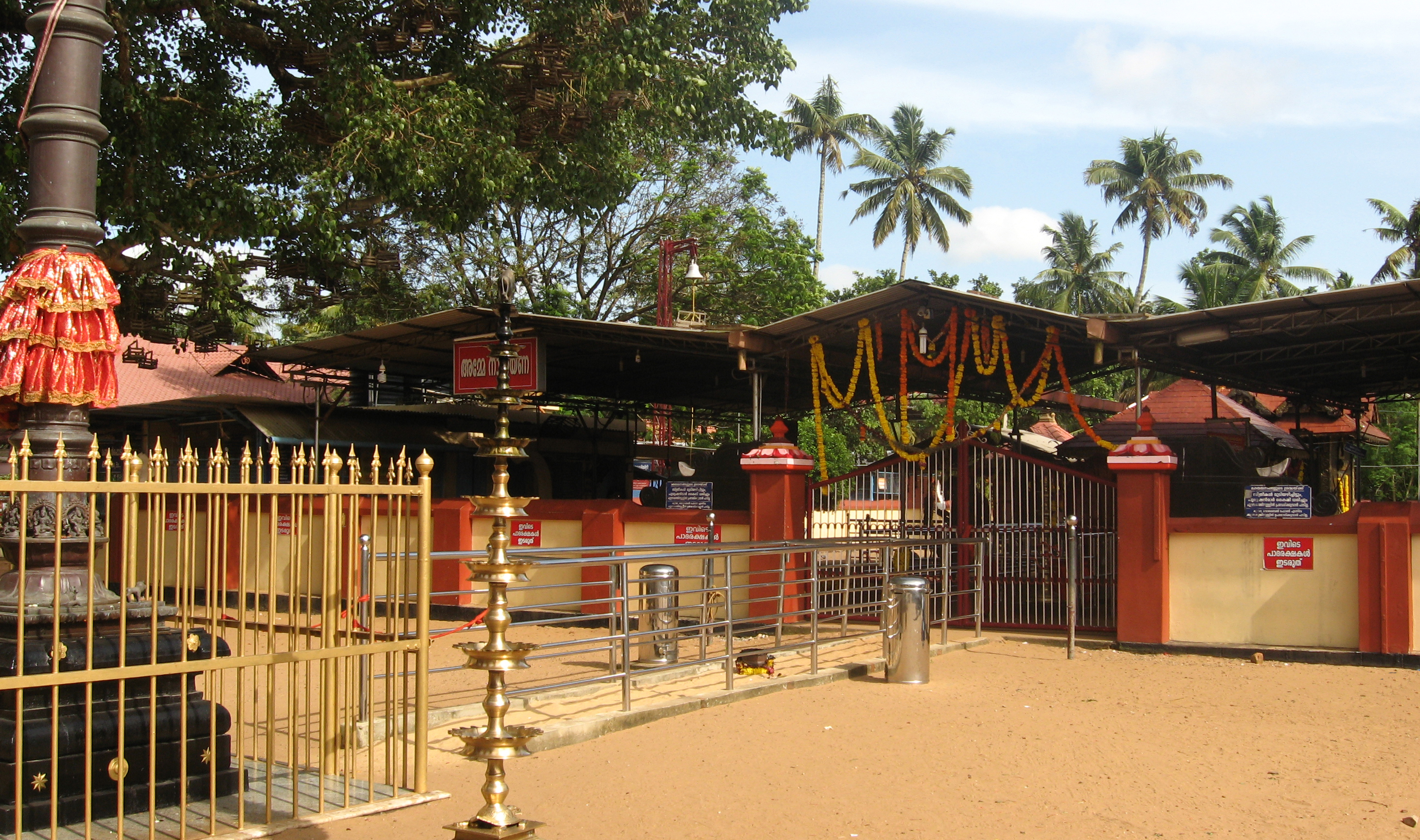
Vadakkevila Koonambaikulam Temple

Thalavoor Sri Durga Devi Temple, Thazhava Pulimukham devi temple, Peroor Karunalloor Bhagavathy Temple, Pattazhy Devi Temple and Kundara Ilampalloor Devi Temple are among the important Hindu temples in Kollam District.

Another important temple is the Kottamkulangara temple near Chavara, where there is a tradition of males participating in 'Vilakkeduppu' wearing women's dresses.

Koonambaikulam (വലിയകൂനംബായ്കുളം) temple is very popular. Deity there is a Goddess, named 'Koonambaikulathu Amma'.

Other temples in Kollam include Peroor sree meenakshi temple at Punthalathazham, Mangalathu temple at Punthalathazham etc.

=== Mata Amritanandamayi ===
World famous spiritual Guru Mata Amritanandamayi has her ashram set near the Arabian sea at Amritapuri in Karunagappalli taluk of Kollam district. Parayakadavu, a coastal village near Karunagapally, is the birthplace of Mata Amritanandamayi and is the headquarters of her Math. Thirumullavarom Temple is the most famous temple in Kollam situated near the Arabian Sea where thousands used to come annually for performing Vavu Bali.

== Muslim worship ==
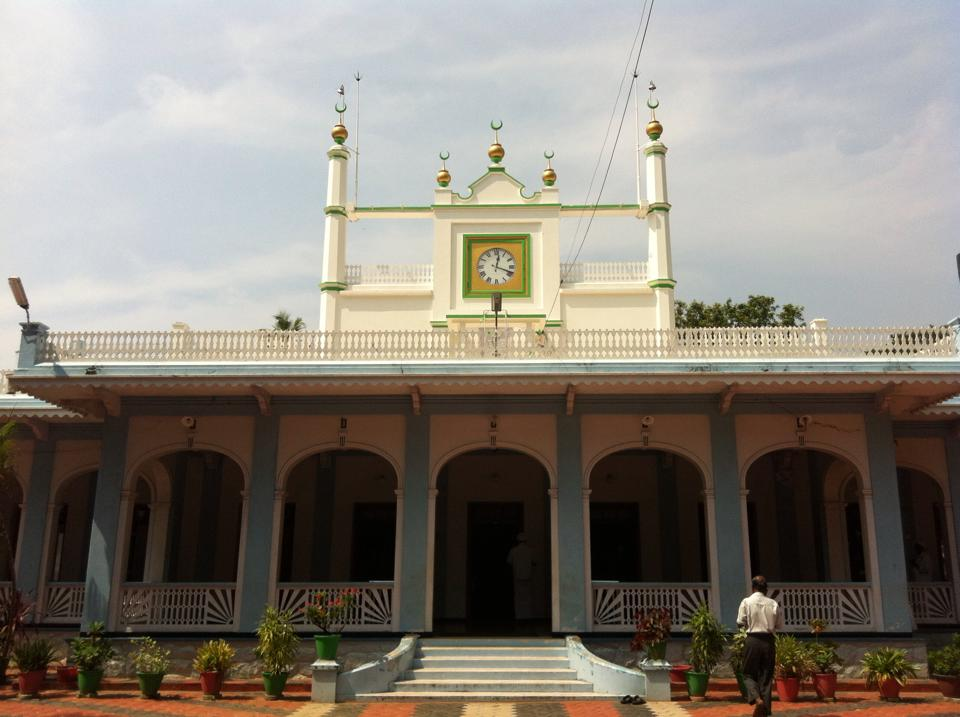
Muthirapparambu Mosque, an older mosque in Kollam district

Islam is a religion that is followed by 19.3% of the population of Kollam district. It is the only district south of Malabar region where Muslims outnumber Christians. More than 94% of Muslims of Kollam are Sunni. There is no significant Shia population. However there is presence of Ahmadiyya Muslims in Kollam and Karunagappalli.

In Kollam dargah influence (mayyath worship) from Tamil Nadu has a strong presence. There is rise of orthodoxy following rise of Salafism from late 1980's.

The most important mosques include:

- Muthirapparambu Palli
- Siyarathummodu Palli
- Chinnakkada Palli
- Valiyapalli
- Jonakappuram Juma Masjid
- Kollurvila, Pallimukku
- Thattamala
- Jumma-ath-palli
- Jumma-ath_masjid,
- Muslim Jumma-Ath-Palli
- Karuva Muslim Jumma-ath
- Niravil Muslim Jumma-ath
- Kalamala Palli, Kalamala
- Thrippilazikom pally kundara
- Kalamala palli

== Christian worship ==
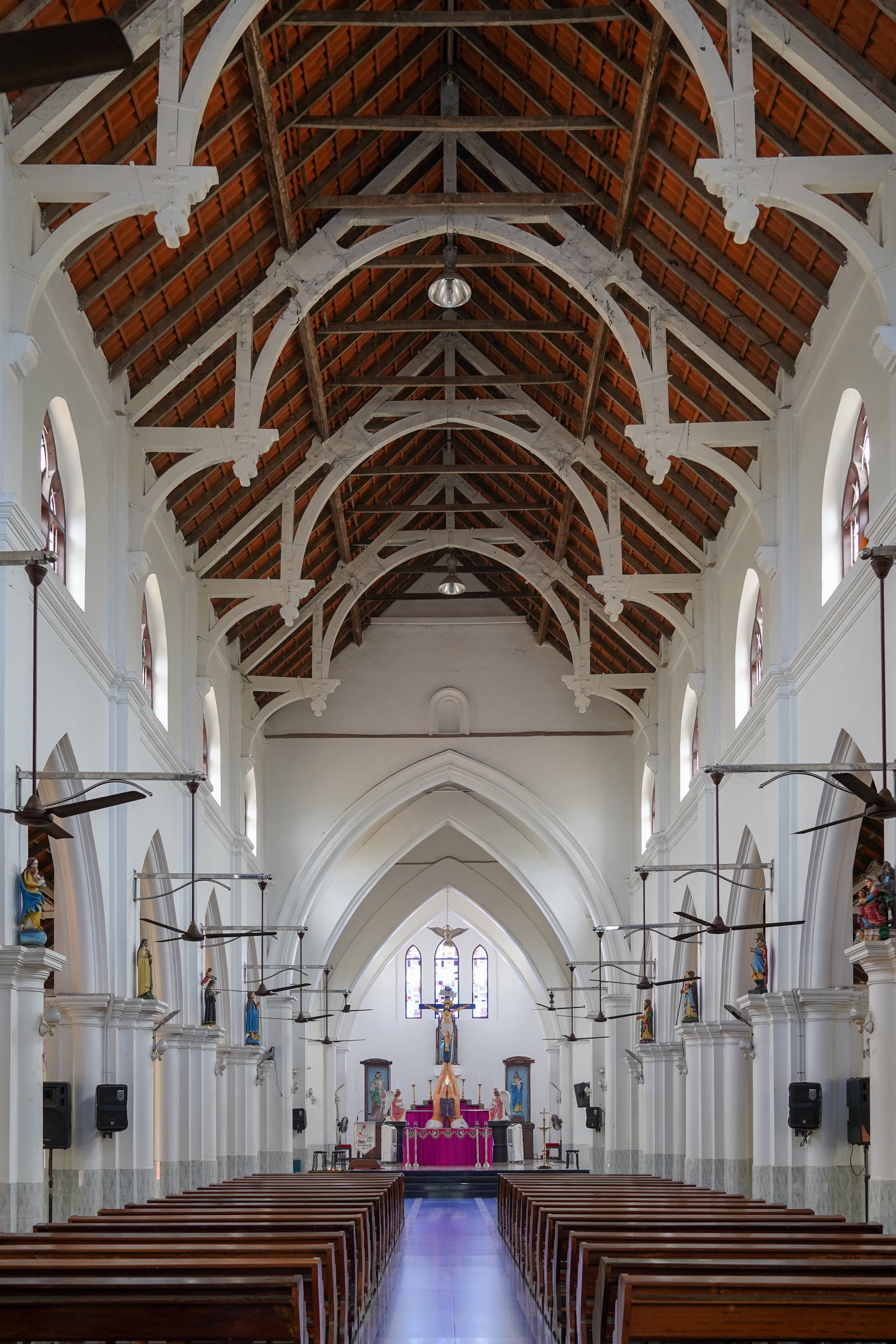
Interior of St. Antony's Church, Vaddy

Christians form 16% of the population of Kollam district. The majority of them are Latin Catholics who form 43.7% followed by the Malankara Syrian Catholic Church who form roughly 25 % then Malankara Orthodox Syrian Church who form 15% of the Christians in the district. The remaining factions including the Marthoma Syrian Church, CSI and various Pentecostal groups combined form 16.3% of the Christians in the district.

The Apostle Thomas founded one of his seven churches in Kollam. They were family or community churches as neither Holy Bible was codified nor cross was acknowledged as the symbol of Christian faith in the first century AD. The church founded by the Apostle at the ancient Kollam port of Tarsish (thevalakara) was re-constructed three times. The second reorganising of the Tarsish Christian nambuthiri community which was still inside vedic Vaishnavism was in the 4th century when a Persian cross brought from a Red sea port was erected in accordance with the Nicaea sunnahodose the first ecumenical council of the Christian church, meeting in ancient Nicaea (now İznik, Tur.). It was called by the Emperor Constantine I, an unbaptized catechumen, or neophyte, who presided over the opening session and took part in the discussions declaration making the cross the symbol of Christian faith the World over for the first time. In 825 AD Mar S(abo)r ministered here reconstructing the Tarsish-a-palli at Thevalakara for the third time. This was the first church founded by him with Syrian liturgy after receiving the Tharisappalli Plates from Kulshekara kings which in reality laid the foundation of Christianity as a religion in Kerala outside Vedic Vaishnavism.

=== Infant Jesus Cathedral ===
The Infant Jesus Cathedral (Malayalam: ഇൻഫന്റ് ജീസസ് കത്തീഡ്രൽ) (Portuguese: Igreja do Bom Jesú) is a historic Roman Catholic church established by the Portuguese during 1614. It is situated at Tangasseri in the city of Kollam. The old church was demolished and reconstructed in 2005. It was elevated to a cathedral i.e. the seat of the Bishop of the Roman Catholic Diocese of Quilon, the first Catholic diocese of India.

=== St. Antony's Church, Kollam ===
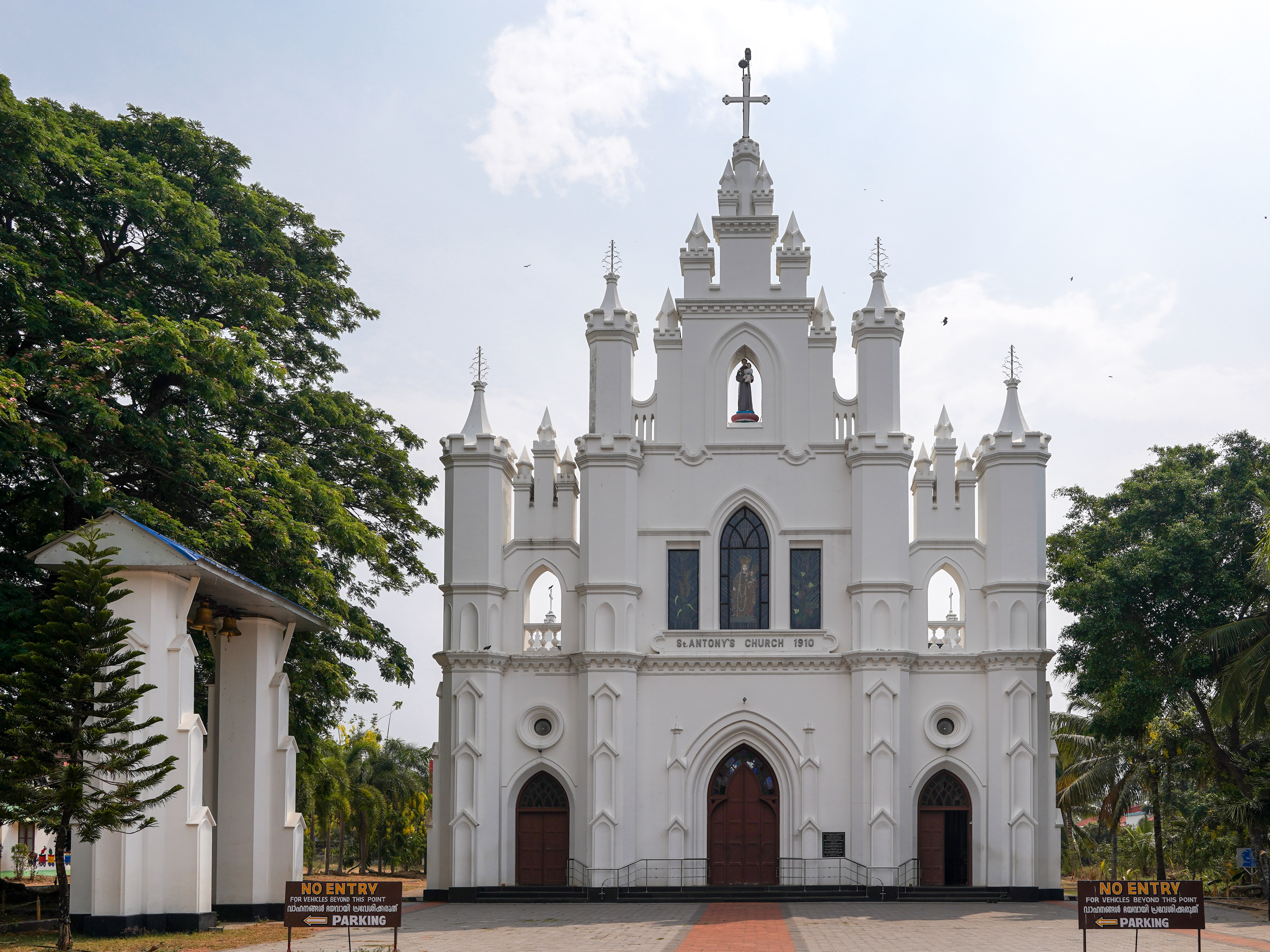
St. Antony's Church, Vaddy in Mar. 2022

St. Antony's Church, Vaddy, Kollam has a history of about 700 years. In the 1320s, Jordanus Catalani, Dominican friar from Sererac, built the first Vaddy Church. It was named St. George Church. When the Portuguese arrived in Quilon in 1503, the Franciscans took over the church and renamed it St. Antony's Church. The Church was washed away by the sea in 1602. In 1699 Bishop Dom Peters Pachao built a new Church in the Gothic style. This Church was also washed away by the sea. The present third Church was built during 1910–13 by a Goan priest Fr. Ambrose Kompadi. The Church was blessed in November 1913 by the Most Rev. Msgr. Michael Lodislaus Zaleski, the papal Apostolic Delegate. The sanctuary, sacristy and two wings were completed in 1952 by Fr. Alphonse Thundil. The Church was renovated in 2001.

=== St. Casimir's Church, Kadavoor ===
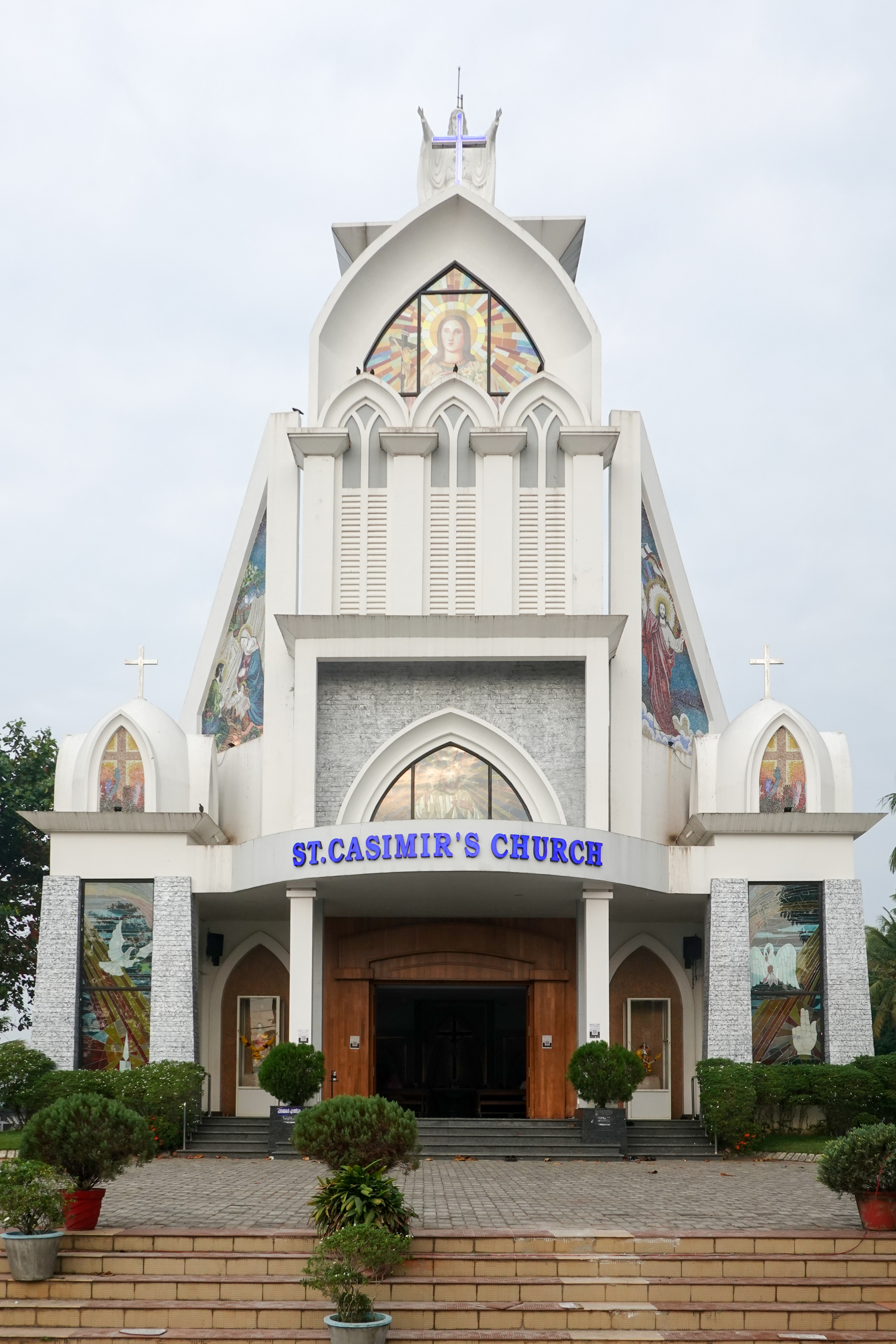
St. Casimir's Church, Kollam, reconstructed 1993

The first permanent building of St. Casimir's Church was erected in Kadavoor just north of Quilon in 1873. The Church was reconstructed in 1993 and renovated in 2013. A shrine of St. George was constructed in front of the Church in 1916. The Shrine was reconstructed in 1960.

=== Dutch Church, Munroe Island ===
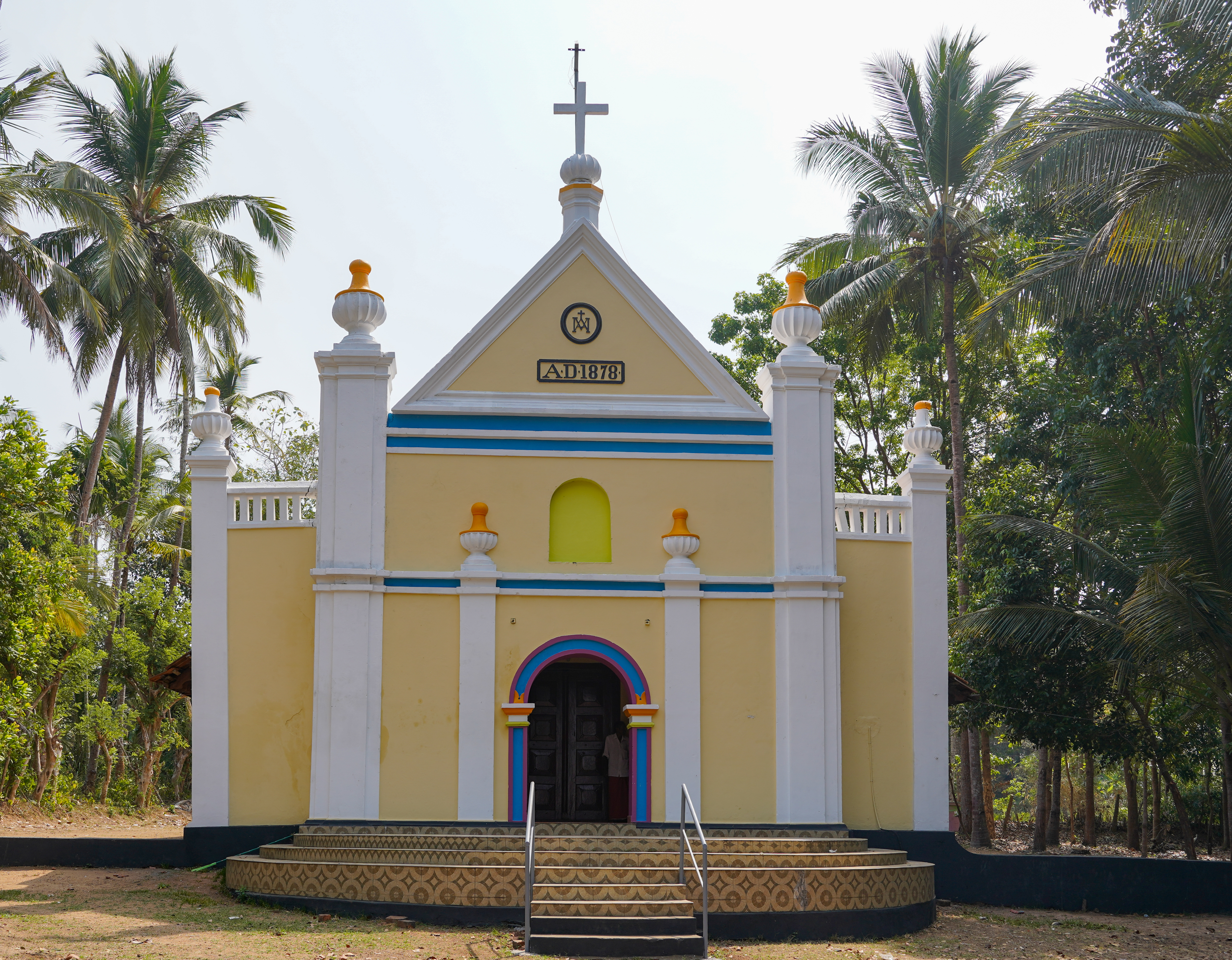
Dutch Church, Munroe Island, built 1878

This Church was built on Munroe Island by the Dutch in 1878. Located on the scenic banks of Lake Ashtamudi, the Church is a blend of Dutch-Kerala architecture. Its use has declined of late.

=== Other Churches ===
- St. Thomas Orthodox Church (Kundara valiya pally), Kundara
- St. Mary's Cathedral, Kundara
- Mount Tabor Monastery, Pathanapuram
- Origin of Malankara Church of God Thrikkannamangal
- St. Mary's Cathedral, Punalur
- St. Andrew's Church, Kovilthottam
- St Antony's Church, Kanjiracode
- St. Elijah's Church, Koduvila
- St. George's Church, Chathannoor
