= Irupathiyetttam Onam =

Post-harvest cattle festival in Onattukara, Kerala, India

Irupathiyettam Onam ഇരുപത്തിയെട്ടാം ഓണം
- Status: Active
- Genre: Cultural, Harvest
- Begins: 28th day after Thiruvonam
- Venue: Oachira Parabrahma Temple
- Locations: Oachira, Kollam district, Kerala

Irupathiyettam Onam (ഇരുപത്തിയെട്ടാം ഓണം; lit. "Twenty-Eighth Onam") is a post-harvest festival celebrated in the Onattukara region of Kerala, India. The event occurs exactly 28 days after Thiruvonam, the primary day of the Onam festival. The celebration is defined by the Oachira Kalakettu, a ritual involving the procession of bull effigies to the Oachira Parabrahma Temple.

== Significance and customs ==
The festival is traditionally categorized as the "Onam of the cattle" and is linked to the agrarian history of the region. It functions as a ritualistic thanksgiving to livestock for their role in the preceding harvest cycle. Unlike the standard Onam celebrations that commemorate the legend of Mahabali, Irupathiyettam Onam emphasizes the socio-economic relationship between the farming community and their cattle.

== Kalakettu ritual ==
Ochira Kalakettu is an annual cultural festival held on the 28th day after Thiruvonam at the Ochira Parabrahma Temple in Kollam district, Kerala. The festival features large decorated bull effigies, known as Kettukalas(lit. "tying of the bull"), which are prepared by local communities and brought to the temple in procession.

Kalakettu richual as part of Irupathiyettam Onam

Representatives of 52 traditional localities, or karas, of the Onattukara region participate in the festival. The effigies vary in size and decoration and are accompanied by traditional percussion during the procession.

- Construction: The effigies are built using a framework of wood and bamboo, layered with straw, and covered in white or colored cloth. Decorations typically include traditional ornaments, mirrors, and fabric hangings.
- Procession: These effigies are mounted on wheeled platforms and pulled by residents to the temple grounds. The height of the effigies can exceed 30 feet, representing the resources of the sponsoring kara.

=== Venue ===
The festival culminates at the Padanilam (battlefield), an open ground surrounding the Oachira Parabrahma Temple. The temple is noted for the absence of a traditional sanctum sanctorum, as it is dedicated to the concept of Para Brahma. During the festival, the bull effigies are presented at the site as a symbolic offering, aligning agricultural traditions with the temple's spiritual framework.
