= Replicas of Michelangelo's Pietà =

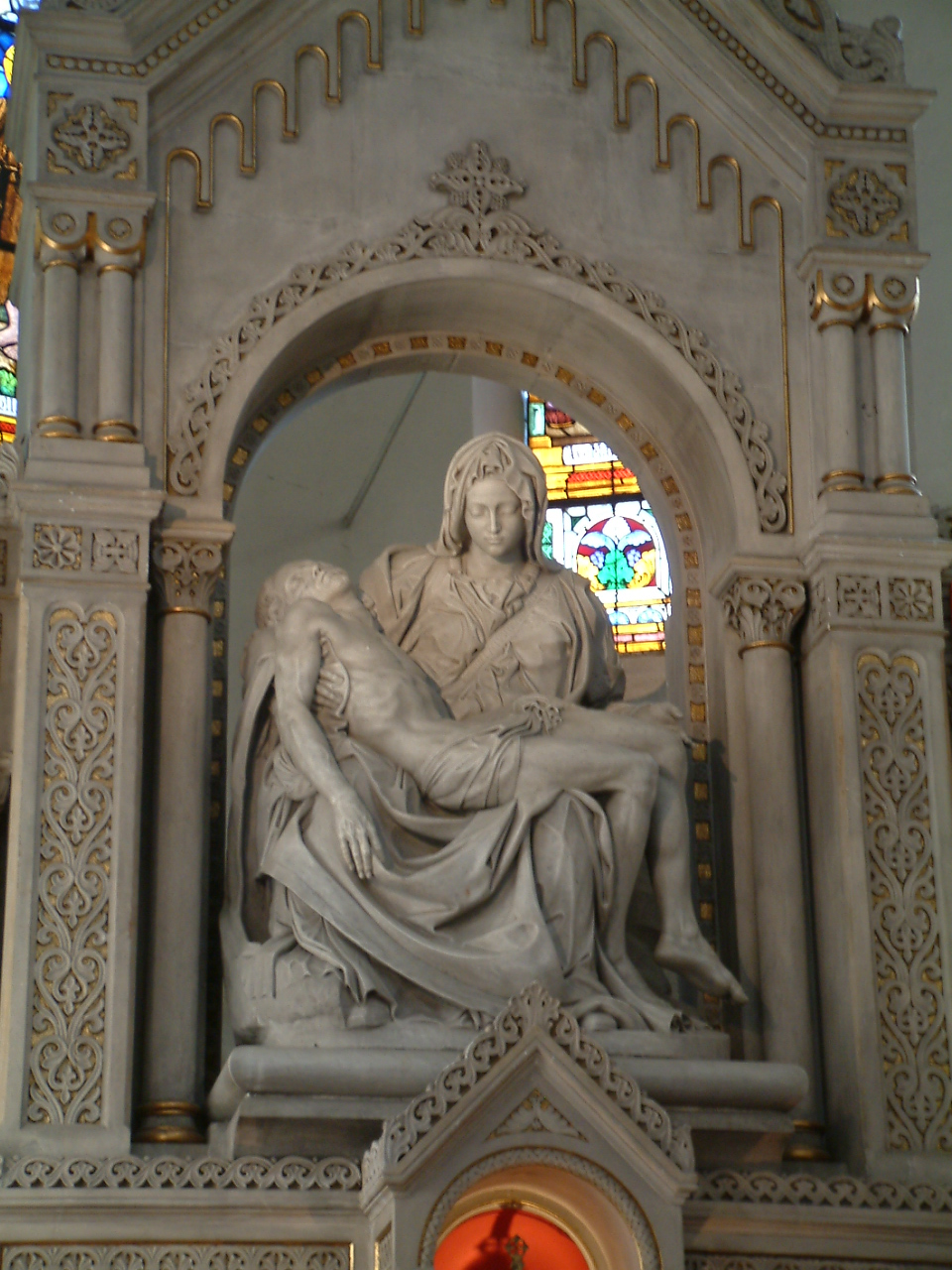
Replica in Poznań, Poland

This is a list of replicas of Michelangelo's 1498–1499 statue, Pietà.

== Asia ==
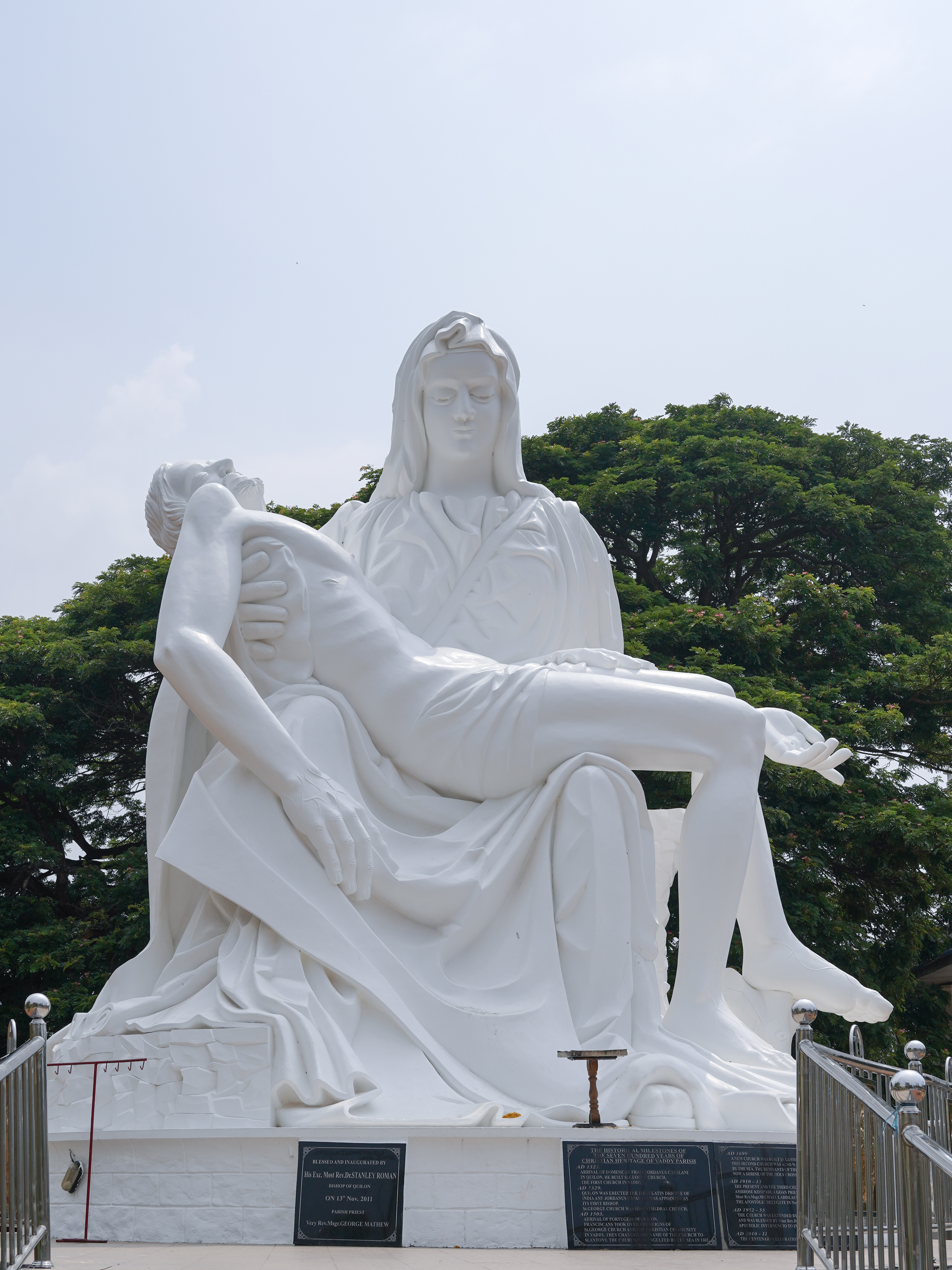
St. Antony's Church, Kollam, Kerala, India

- St. Mary's Cathedral, Tokyo, Tokyo, Japan
- St. Antony's Church, Kollam, Kerala, India
- St. Joseph's Catholic Church, Meenkunnam, Kerala, India
- St. John's Church, Seongnam, South Korea
- Minor Basilica of the Immaculate Conception Manila Metropolitan Cathedral, Manila, Philippines
- Our Lady of Remedies Parish Malate, Manila, Philippines
- Our Lady of Atonement Cathedral, Baguio City, Philippines
- Loyola Memorial Park Parañaque City, Philippines
- Our Lady of Sorrows Parish, Pasay, Philippines
- La Verna, Bandar Lampung, Indonesia
- Cathedral of the Good Shepherd, Singapore
- St Laurensius, Alam Sutera, Tangerang Selatan – Banten, Indonesia

== Australasia ==
- St Mary's Cathedral, Sydney, Australia

== Europe ==
- R.K. kerk Sint Cyriacus en Franciscus in Hoorn, Netherlands
- H.H. Simon en Judaskerk in Lattrop, Netherlands
- Church of Our Lady of Sorrows, Poznań, Poland
- University Church of the Blessed Name of Jesus, Wrocław, Poland
- Leeds Cathedral, United Kingdom
- Petworth House, Petworth, United Kingdom
- Guadix Cathedral, Granada, Spain.
- Madre del Buon Consiglio, Naples, Italy.
- Cathedral of SS Patrick & Colman, Newry.
- Another one is in one of Romania's Churches in Transylvania: Alba Iulia Church

== North America ==
- Holy Cross Cemetery, Culver City, CA
- Forest Lawn Cemetery, Glendale, CA
- Bishop Alemany High School, Mission Hills, CA
- St. Mary's Central High School, Bismarck, ND
- St. Monica Catholic Church, Mishawaka, IN
- The Slater Memorial Museum, Norwich Free Academy, Norwich, CT. Full-sized cast-plaster copy of the original sculpture.
- Basilica of Sainte-Anne-de-Beaupré Quebec City, Canada

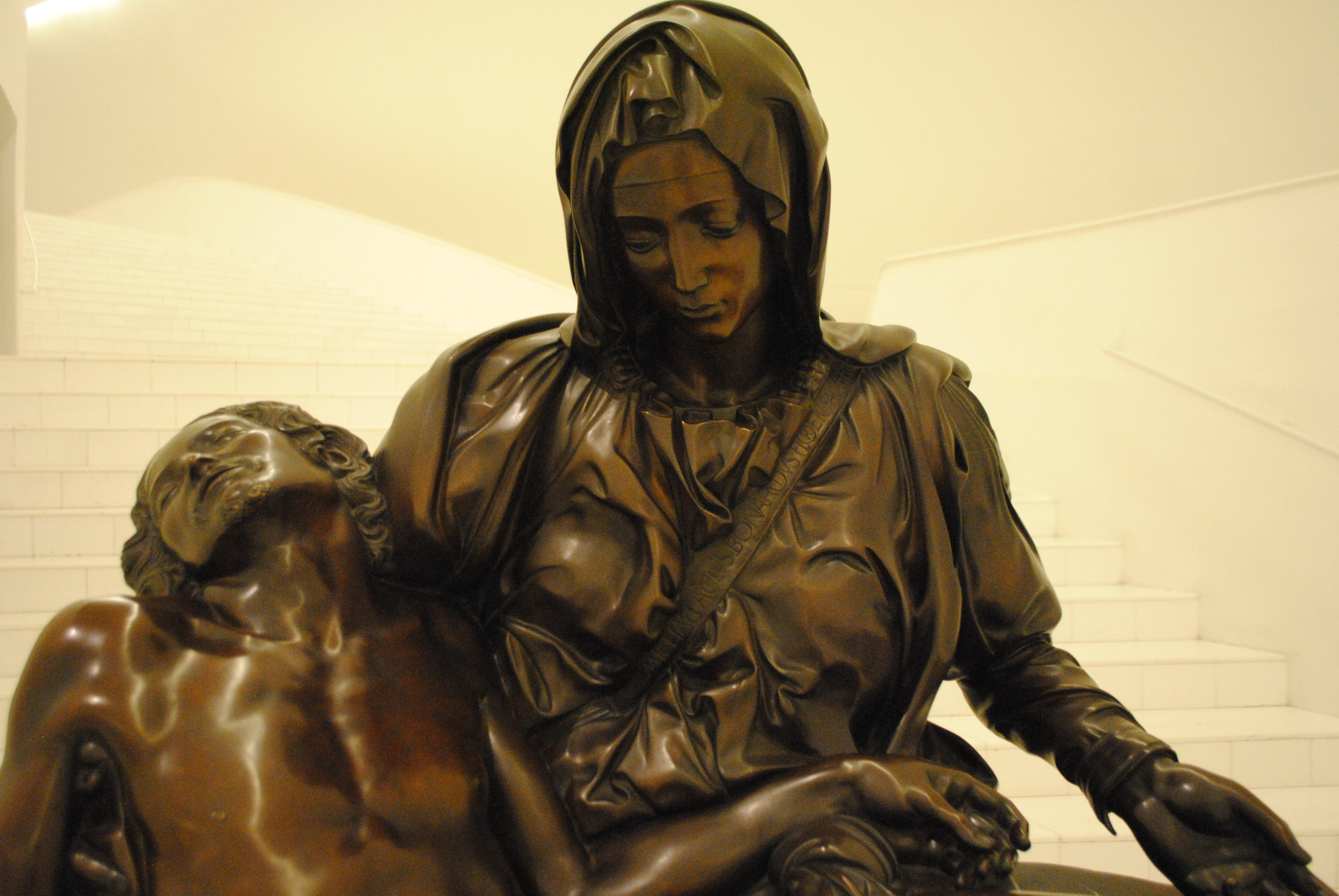
Pietà at Museo Soumaya, Mexico City.

- Soumaya Museum, Mexico City, Mexico
- Cathedral of Our Lady of Refuge, Matamoros, Mexico
- Sacred Heart of Jesus Catholic Church, Anniston, Alabama
- St Anne Roman Catholic Parish, Gilbert, Arizona
- Cathedral of St. Andrew (Little Rock, Arkansas), Little Rock, Arkansas
- Cathedral of Christ the Light, Oakland, California
- Hotel Mission De Oro, Santa Nella, California
- Slater Memorial Museum, Norwich, Connecticut
- Mother of Christ Catholic Church, Miami, Florida
- Saint Benedict Catholic Church, Honaunau, Hawaii
- St. Malachi Parish, Cleveland, Ohio
- Cathedral Basilica of St. Peter in Chains, Cincinnati, Ohio
- Our Lady of Sorrows Basilica, Chicago, Illinois – carved in Pietrasanta Italy by Spartaco Palla.
- Alexander Memorial Park Cemetery, Evansville, Indiana. The full-sized marble statue is located inside The Chapel Of Remembrance mausoleum.
- St. Patrick's Catholic Church, Imogene, Iowa
- St. Angus Catholic Church, Pouch Cove, Newfoundland, Canada
- Cathedral of the Immaculate Conception, Wichita, Kansas
- St. Pius X Catholic Church, Lafayette, Louisiana. 2014 Arte Divine-Vatican Conservatory Foundation, No. 39 of 100, Medium – Cast Marble, Life Size. Donated by the Stuller Family.
- Holy Family Catholic Church, Concord, Massachusetts
- Holy Family Catholic Church in Saginaw, Michigan
- St. Mary's Parish, Spring Lake, Michigan
- Cathedral of Saint Paul, National Shrine of the Apostle Paul, Saint Paul, Minnesota
- Cathedral Basilica of Saint Louis, Missouri
- Our Mother of Sorrows Cemetery, Reno Nevada. The statue is located at the main entrance to the cemetery
- St. Thomas Aquinas Cathedral, Reno, Nevada (This copy is approved by the Vatican according to the Church bulletin)
- St. Patrick's Cathedral, New York City
- St. Joseph's Seminary and College (Dunwoodie), Yonkers, NY
- Wilhelm's Portland Memorial Funeral Home, Portland, Oregon
- Resurrection Catholic Parish, Tualatin, Oregon
- The Church of Saint Joseph, Jim Thorpe, Pennsylvania
- St. Alexander Roman Catholic Church, Warren, Rhode Island
- Hamilton Memorial Gardens, Chapel of Devotion, Hixson, Tennessee
- St. Anne's Catholic Church, Beaumont, Texas
- St. Jude Catholic Church, Mansfield, Texas
- Socorro Mission – La Purisima Catholic Church, Socorro, Texas
- Christ United Methodist Church, Salt Lake City, Utah
- St. Mary of the Lakes Parish, Lakewood, Wisconsin
- Italian Community Center of Milwaukee, Milwaukee, Wisconsin
- Mission San Buenaventura, Ventura, California. 2018 Arte Divine-Vatican Conservatory Foundation, No. 73/100, Medium-Cast Marble, Life Size.
- Dixie State University's Dolores Dore Eccles Fine Arts Center, St. George, Utah. #14/100
- St. Viator Catholic Church, Old Irving Park, Chicago, Illinois
- St. Thomas More Catholic Parish, Centennial, Colorado
- The Academy of Our Lady of Peace, San Diego, California. An exact 1:1 cast from the original sculpture.

== South America ==
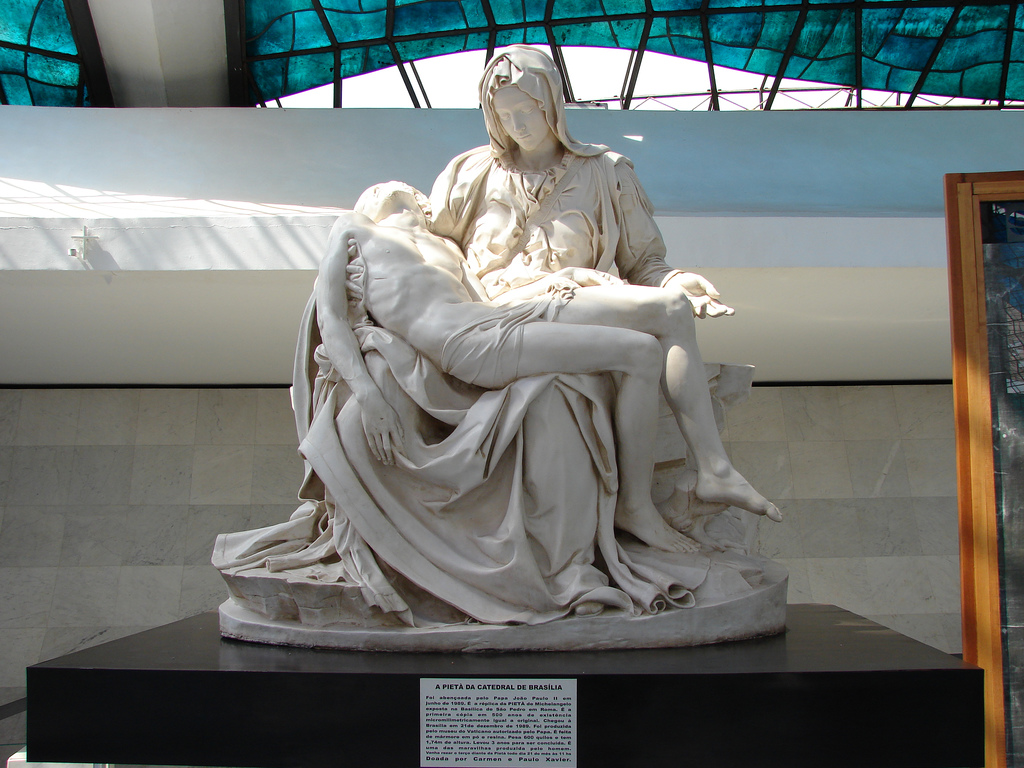
The Pietà statue at the National Cathedral of Brasília, Brazil.

- The Metropolitan Cathedral of Brasília, Brasilia, Brazil.
- The Church of Nossa Senhora da Conceição, Urussanga, Santa Catarina, Brazil.
- The Church of São Pelegrino, Caxias do Sul, Brazil
- The Church of Santiago Apostol Lampa, Puno, Peru
- Entrance of Cemetery One, Valparaíso, Chile

== See also ==
- List of statues of Jesus
- List of works by Michelangelo
