= Pietà (Michelangelo) =

Sculpture by Michelangelo

Pietà [Our Lady of] Pity
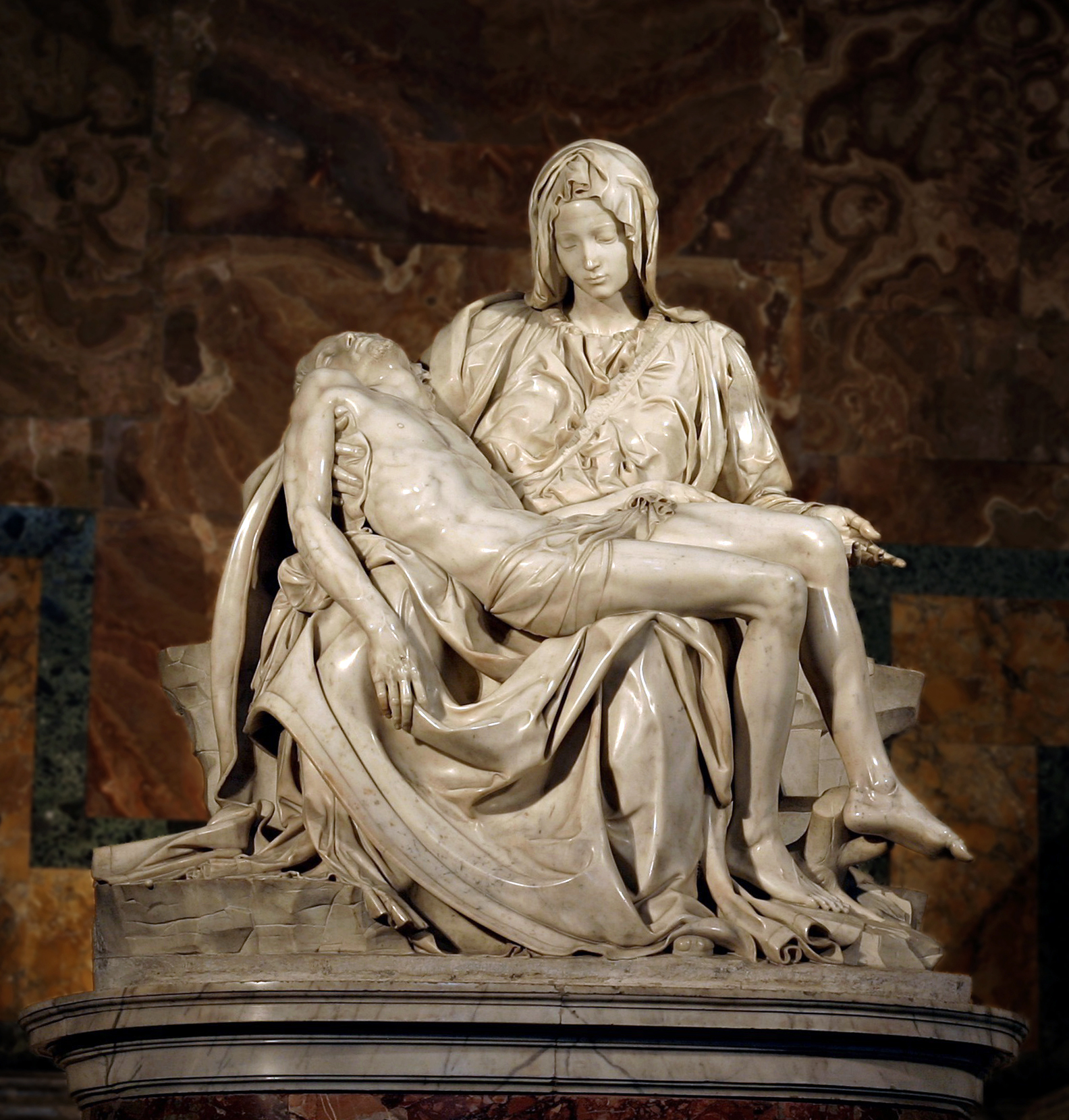
- The location of the statue today Click on the map to see marker.
- Artist: Michelangelo Buonarroti
- Year: 1498–1499
- Type: Marble
- Subject: Jesus and Mary
- Dimensions: 174 cm × 195 cm (68.5 in × 76.8 in)
- Location: Saint Peter's Basilica, Vatican City; 41°54′08″N 12°27′12″E
- Preceded by: Bacchus (Michelangelo)
- Followed by: David (Michelangelo)

The Pietà (Madonna della Pietà, Italian: [maˈdɔnna della pjeˈta]; '[Our Lady of] Pity'; 1498–1499) is a Carrara marble sculpture of Jesus and Mary at Mount Golgotha representing the "Sixth Sorrow" of the Virgin Mary by Michelangelo Buonarroti, in Saint Peter's Basilica, Vatican City, for which it was made. It is a key work of Italian Renaissance sculpture and often taken as the start of the High Renaissance.

The sculpture captures the moment when Jesus, taken down from the cross, is given to his mother Mary. Mary looks younger than Jesus; art historians believe Michelangelo was inspired by a passage in Dante Alighieri's Divine Comedy: "O virgin mother, daughter of your Son [...] your merit so ennobled human nature that its divine Creator did not hesitate to become its creature" (Paradiso, Canto XXXIII). Michelangelo's aesthetic interpretation of the Pietà is unprecedented in Italian sculpture because it balances early forms of naturalism with the Renaissance ideals of classical beauty.

The statue was originally commissioned by a French cardinal, Jean Bilhères de Lagraulas, then French ambassador in Rome. The sculpture was made, probably as an altarpiece, for the cardinal's funeral chapel in Old St Peter's. When this was demolished it was preserved, and later took its current location, the first chapel on the north side after the entrance of the new basilica, in the 18th century. It is the only piece Michelangelo ever signed.

The statue had to be restored after the figure of Mary was vandalized on Pentecost Sunday of 1972; after the incident, the statue was protected by a bulletproof glass screen that was replaced and modernized in November 2024 in preparation for the 2025 Jubilee.

== History ==
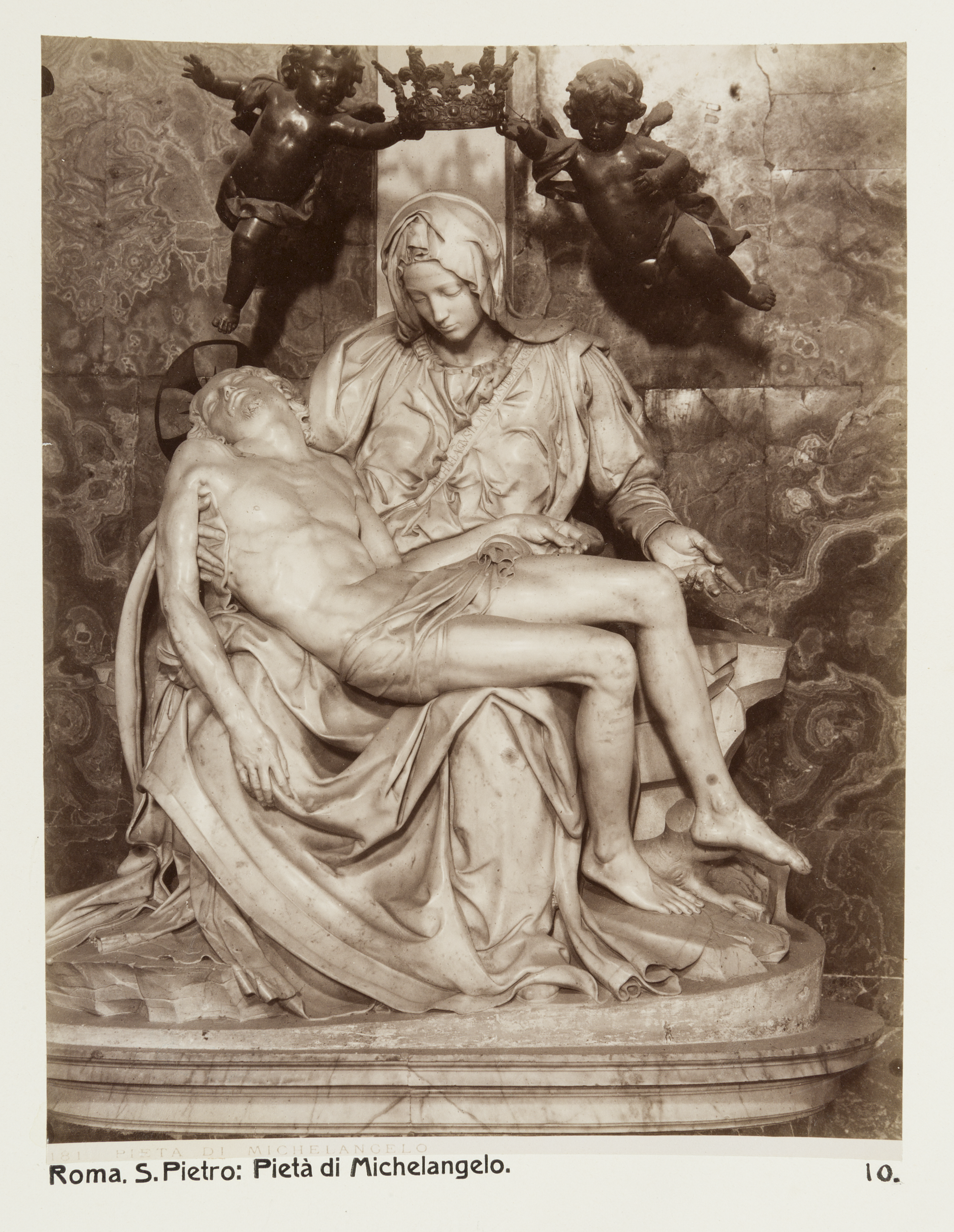
The venerated image with its original canonical crown from 14 August 1637 by the Pontifical decree of Pope Urban VIII. Photo circa, 24 May 1888.

The statue was originally commissioned by the former Bishop of Condom, Cardinal Jean de Villiers du Lagraulas. The sculpture was intended to be an altarpiece for his funeral chapel within Old Saint Peter's Basilica. The chapel of Saint Petronilla was later demolished and the sculpture was later moved to its current location, the first chapel on the north side after the entrance of the new basilica, in the 18th century. It is the only piece Michelangelo ever signed.

The structure is pyramidal, and the vertex coincides with Mary's head. The statue widens progressively down the drapery of Mary's dress, to the base, the rock of Golgotha. The figures are quite out of proportion, owing to the difficulty of depicting a fully-grown man cradled full-length in a woman's lap. Much of Mary's body is concealed by her monumental drapery, and the relationship of the figures appears quite natural. Michelangelo's interpretation of the Pietà was far different from those previously created by other artists, as he sculpted a young and beautiful Mary rather than a naturally older woman (aged 45+) that should be commensurate with the natural age of her son, Jesus (aged 33).

The marks of the Crucifixion are limited to very small nail marks and an indication of the wound in Jesus' side. Accordingly, Christ's face does not reveal signs of the Passion. According to another interpretation, when Michelangelo set out to create his Pietà, he wanted to create a work he described as "the heart's image".

Two drilled holes are located at the top head of the Virgin Mary, which once supported the bar holding two levitating angels, while another hole is located at the tophead of the Christ image.

== Age of Mary ==
three-dimensional model

Mary is represented as being very young for the mother of an approximately 33-year-old son, which is not uncommon in depictions of the Passion of Christ at the time. Various explanations have been suggested for this. One is that her youth symbolizes her incorruptible purity, as Michelangelo himself said to his biographer, the compatriot and Roman sculptor Ascanio Condivi:

"Do you not know that chaste women stay fresh much more than those who are not chaste? How much more in the case of the Virgin, who had never experienced the least lascivious desire that might change her body?"

Another theory suggests that Michelangelo's treatment of the subject was influenced by his passion for Dante's Divine Comedy: so well-acquainted was he with the work that when he went to Bologna, he paid for hospitality by reciting verses from it. In Paradiso (Canto XXXIII of the poem), Saint Bernard of Clairvaux in a prayer for the Virgin Mary, says: "Vergine madre, figlia del tuo figlio" ("Virgin mother, daughter of your son").

== Canonical coronation ==
Urban VIII granted the venerated Marian image a decree of canonical coronation via his Papal bull Domina Coronatum Est signed and notarized on 14 August 1637 and granted to its patronal donor, Lord Ascanio Sforza y Pallavicini and Canon priest of the Vatican chapter, Monsignor Ugo Ubaldini.

The levitating diadem was manufactured by the Italian artisan, Fantino Taglietti, who charged 564 Italian scudo coins at the time. The official rite of coronation was executed on 31 August 1637. The cherubic angels were added in 1713 by his descendant, later relocated to the Chapel of the Holy Choir within the basilica in 1749.

== After completion ==
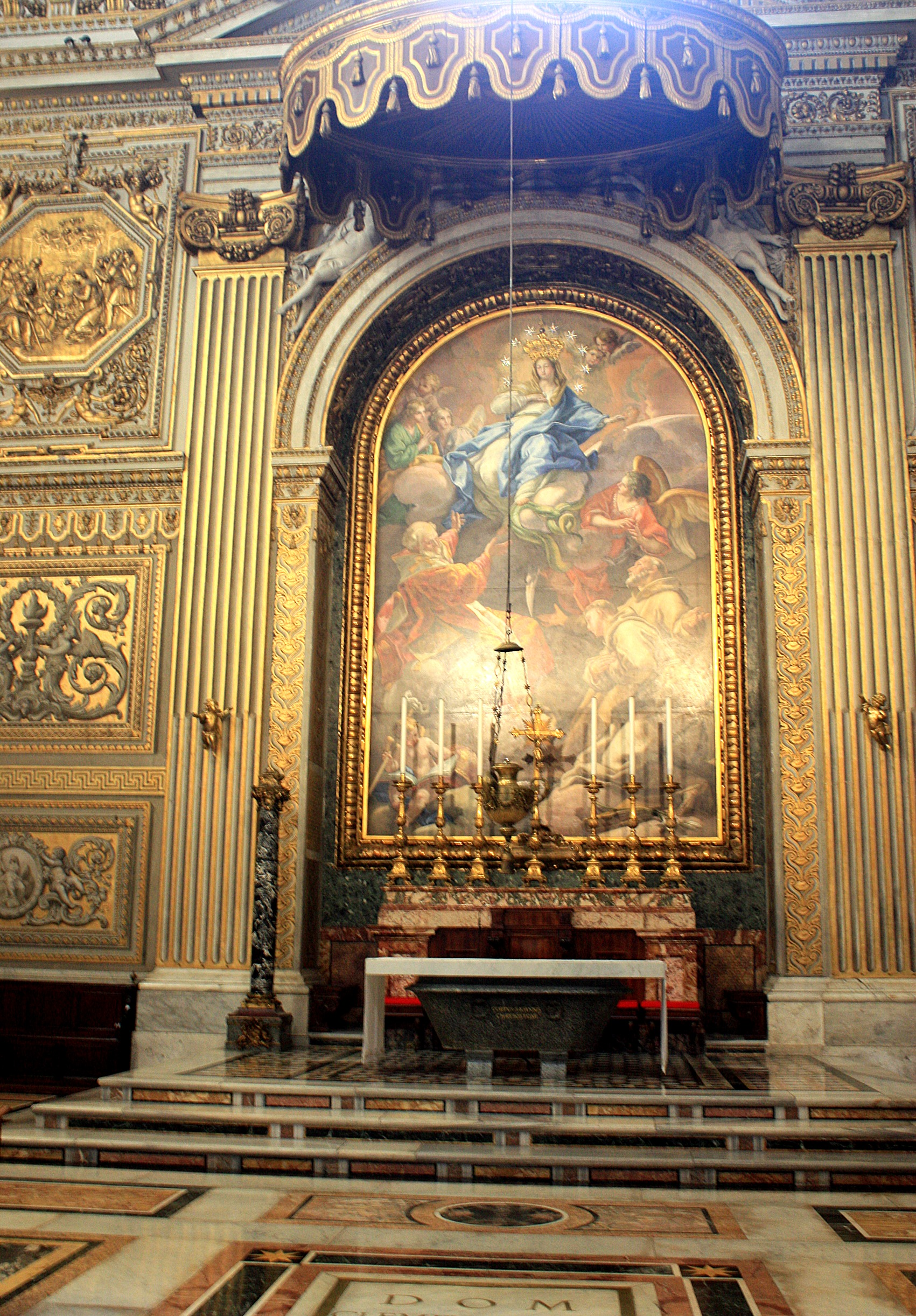
The grand pillars of the Chapel of the Holy Choir, where the two cherubic angels were relocated from the Pietà image in 1749. The Marian image was also pontifically crowned by Pius IX (1854) and Pius X (1904), respectively.

Following completion, the Pietà's first home was the Chapel of Saint Petronilla, a circular Roman mausoleum attached to the south transept of Saint Peter's, with several sub-chapels radiating from the central space. The Cardinal chose one of these as his funerary chapel. While there is now no certainty, it is estimated that each of these niches measured about 4.5 metres wide by 2 metres deep. The chapel was later demolished by Donato Bramante during his rebuilding of the basilica.

According to Giorgio Vasari, shortly after the installation of his Pietà, Michelangelo overheard someone remark (or asked visitors about the sculptor) that it was the work of another sculptor, Cristoforo Solari, whereupon Michelangelo signed the sculpture. Michelangelo carved the words on the sash running across Mary's chest.

MICHÆLANGELVS BONAROTVS FLORENTINVS FACIEBAT
(English: "Michelangelo Buonarroti, the Florentine made this")

The signature echoes one used by the ancient Greek artists Apelles and Polykleitos. It was the only work he ever signed. Vasari also reports the anecdote that Michelangelo later regretted his outburst of pride and swore never to sign another work of his hands.

Fifty years later, Vasari declared the following regarding the Pietà:

"Never think, a rare sculptor or craftsman, to be able to add design or grace, nor with difficulty never being able to finesse, cleanliness and to pierce the marble as much with art, as Michelangelo did there, because you can see in it all the value and power of art."

== Other Michelangelo Pietàs ==
Several decades later, Michelangelo returned twice to the subject of the Pietà, but neither work was completed. The Florentine Pietà of c. 1547 – 1553 was apparently intended for his own tomb, but abandoned after several years work. It is often called a Deposition, representing a moment slightly earlier in the story. The Rondanini Pietà was begun in 1552, and still very unfinished at his death in 1564; he had been working on it six days before.

== Restoration ==
Subsequent to its carving the Pietà sustained much damage. Four fingers on Mary's left hand, broken during a move, were professionally restored in 1736 by the Roman sculptor Giuseppe Lirioni (1690–1746). Modern scholars today are divided as to whether the restorer took artistic liberties to make the hand gestures more "rhetorical".

== 1964 World Fair ==
In 1964, the Pietà was lent by the Vatican to the 1964–1965 New York World's Fair to be installed in the Vatican pavilion. The former Archbishop of New York, Cardinal Francis Spellman formally requested the statue from Pope John XXIII, appointed Edward M. Kinney, Director of Purchasing and Shipping of Catholic Relief Services – USCC, to head up the Vatican Transport Teams. The statue was shipped in a wooden crate 2.5 inches (6.4 cm) thick with an 8-inch (20 cm) base, secured to the deck of the liner Cristoforo Colombo; in case of an accident, the crate contained cushioning so thick that it would float in water, and had an emergency locator beacon as well as a marker buoy attached.

At the fair, people stood in line for hours to catch a glimpse from a conveyor belt moving past the sculpture. It was returned to the Vatican afterwards.

It was returned to St. Peter's Basilica in November 1965. During its replacement, the weight of the marble statue broke a metal ventilation cover in the floor, tilting the crate. Despite fears that this jostling might have damaged the statue, the Pietà was returned to its place unharmed. The New York Times article reporting on the statue's return stated: "By order of Pope Paul VI it will never travel again."

== Vandalism ==
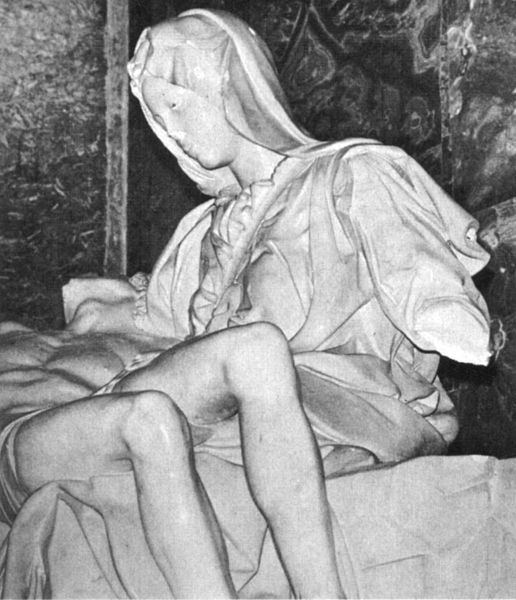
A detail view of the statue with damaged arm, nose and eye, May 1972

The most substantial damage occurred on 21 May 1972 (Pentecost Sunday), when a mentally disturbed geologist, the Hungarian-born Australian Laszlo Toth, walked into the chapel and attacked the sculpture with a geologist's hammer while shouting, "I am Jesus Christ; I have risen from the dead!" With 15 blows he removed Mary's arm at the elbow, knocked off a chunk of her nose, and chipped one of her eyelids.

An American national, Bob Cassilly from St. Louis, Missouri was one of the first people to remove Toth from the Pietà. He recalled the following events:

I leaped up and grabbed the guy by the beard. We both fell into the crowd of screaming Italians. It was something of a scene.

Onlookers took many of the pieces of marble that flew off. Later, some pieces were returned, but many were not, including Mary's nose, which had to be reconstructed from a block cut out of her back.

After the attack, the work was painstakingly restored and returned to its place within the basilica, just to the right of the entrance, between the holy door and the altar of Saint Sebastian, and is now protected by a bulletproof acrylic glass panel. During the restoration, an initial M was found carved on Mary's palm, making the Pietà the only work Michelangelo signed.

== See also ==
- Pietà
- Asteroid 274472 Pietà
- Replicas of Michelangelo's Pietà
- List of statues of Jesus
- List of works by Michelangelo
- List of Vatican City-related articles
