= Changankulangara Mahadeva Temple =

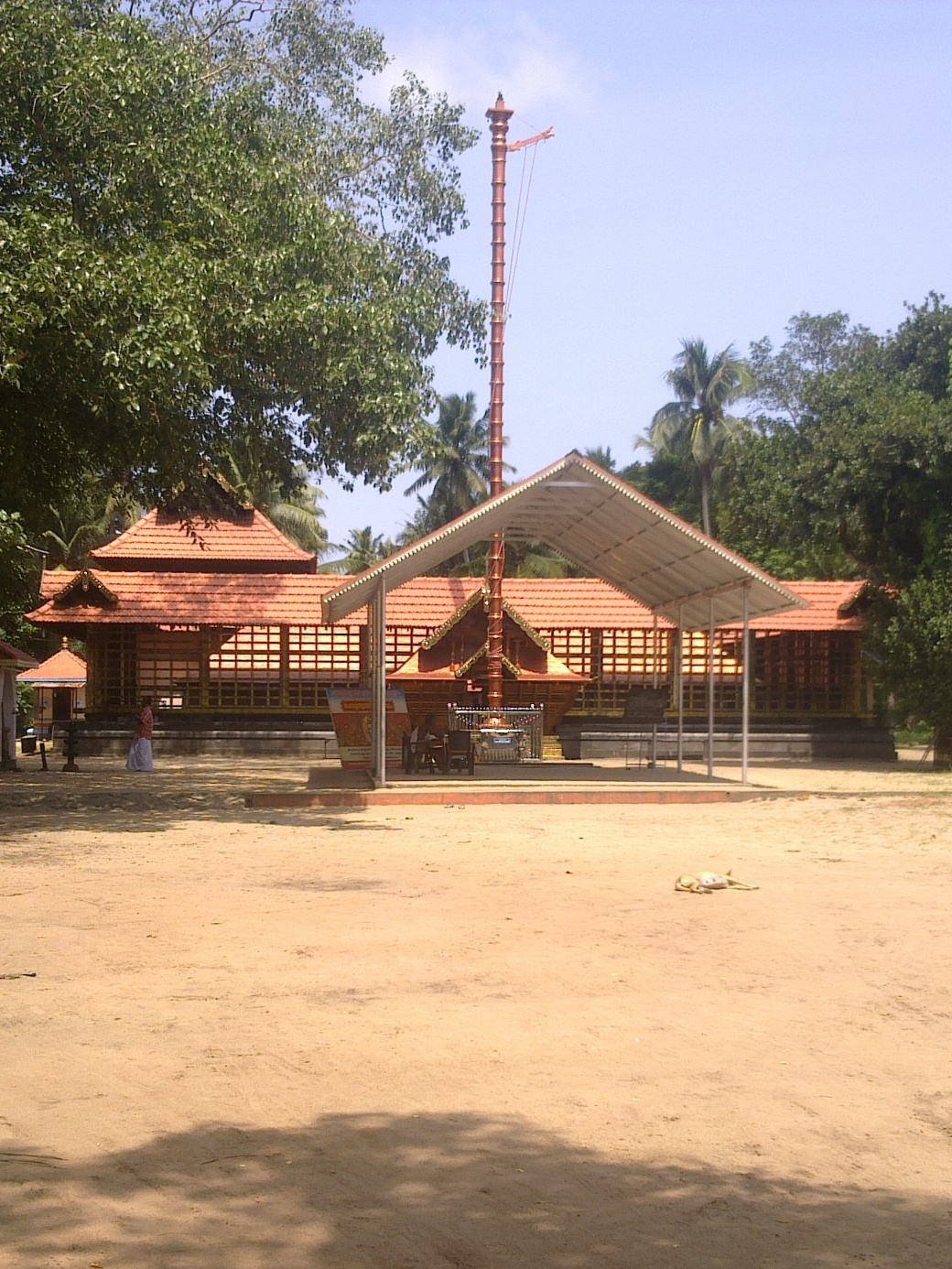
- Changankulangara Mahadeva Temple, Kollam district

- Mahadeva Temple, Changankulangara, Kollam, Kerala

Religion
- Affiliation: Hinduism
- District: Kollam
- Deity: Mahadeva
- Festivals: Maha Shivaratri, Thiruvathira

Location
- Location: Changankulangara, Kollam
- State: Kerala
- Country: India
- Interactive map of Changankulangara Mahadeva Temple
- Coordinates: 9.1088°N 76.5211°E

Architecture
- Type: Architecture of Kerala

Specifications
- Temple: One
- Elevation: 34.49 m (113 ft)

Mahadeva Temple is a Shiva temple at Changankulangara in Kollam in the state of Kerala in India. It is one of the 108 Shiva temples in India.

== Location ==
This temple is located with the coordinates of (9.1088°N 76.5211°E) near Karunagappalli.

Changankulangara Mahadeva Temple (Kerala)

== Details ==
Shiva appears as Mahadeva in this temple and Maha Shivaratri and Thiruvathira are the important festivals celebrated here.
