= Jean Bilhères de Lagraulas =

French cardinal

His Eminence Jean Bilhères de Lagraulas
- Bishop of Lombez
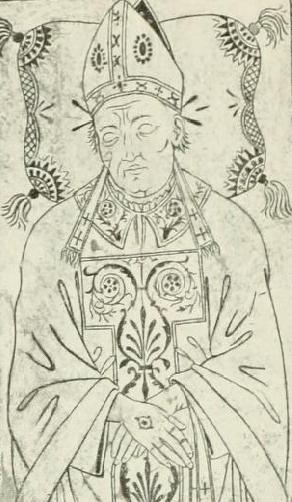
- Line drawing of the effigy of Jean Bilhères de Lagraulas, from his tomb in St. Peter's Basilica
- Church: Catholic Church
- Diocese: Lombez
- Elected: 5 July 1473
- Term ended: 4 August 1499
- Predecessor: Sanche Garsie d'Aure
- Successor: Denis de Villiers de la Groslaye
- Other posts: Cardinal-Priest of Santa Sabina (1493-1499); Bishop of Condom (1496-1499)

Orders
- Created cardinal: 20 September 1493 by Pope Alexander VI
- Rank: Cardinal-Priest

Personal details
- Born: 1435-39 Gascony
- Died: 6 August 1499 (aged 63–64) Rome, Papal States
- Buried: St. Peter's Basilica
- Coat of arms

Jean Bilhères de Lagraulas or Jean Villier de la Grolaie, or Groslaye etc., also called the Cardinal of Saint-Denis (died 1499), was a French Roman Catholic abbot, bishop and from 1493 cardinal. He died as French ambassador in Rome, and is remembered for commissioning Michelangelo in 1498 to sculpt his Pietà for St. Peter's Basilica.

== Biography ==
Jean Bilhères de Lagraulas was born in Gascony in 1435 or 1439, the son of a noble family. His father was the seigneur of Lagraulas, Camicas and, probably, Billère.

Jean Bilhères de Lagraulas entered the Order of Saint Benedict at a young age. In 1473, he became Abbot of Pessan Abbey in Pessan.

He served as a royal counselor to Louis XI. Following the 1473 death of John V, Count of Armagnac, John II of Aragon claimed control of the Quatre-Vallées, which were also claimed by John V's sister. Louis XI sent Abbot Bilhères to the region, and he successfully convinced the Quatre-Vallées to repudiate John II.

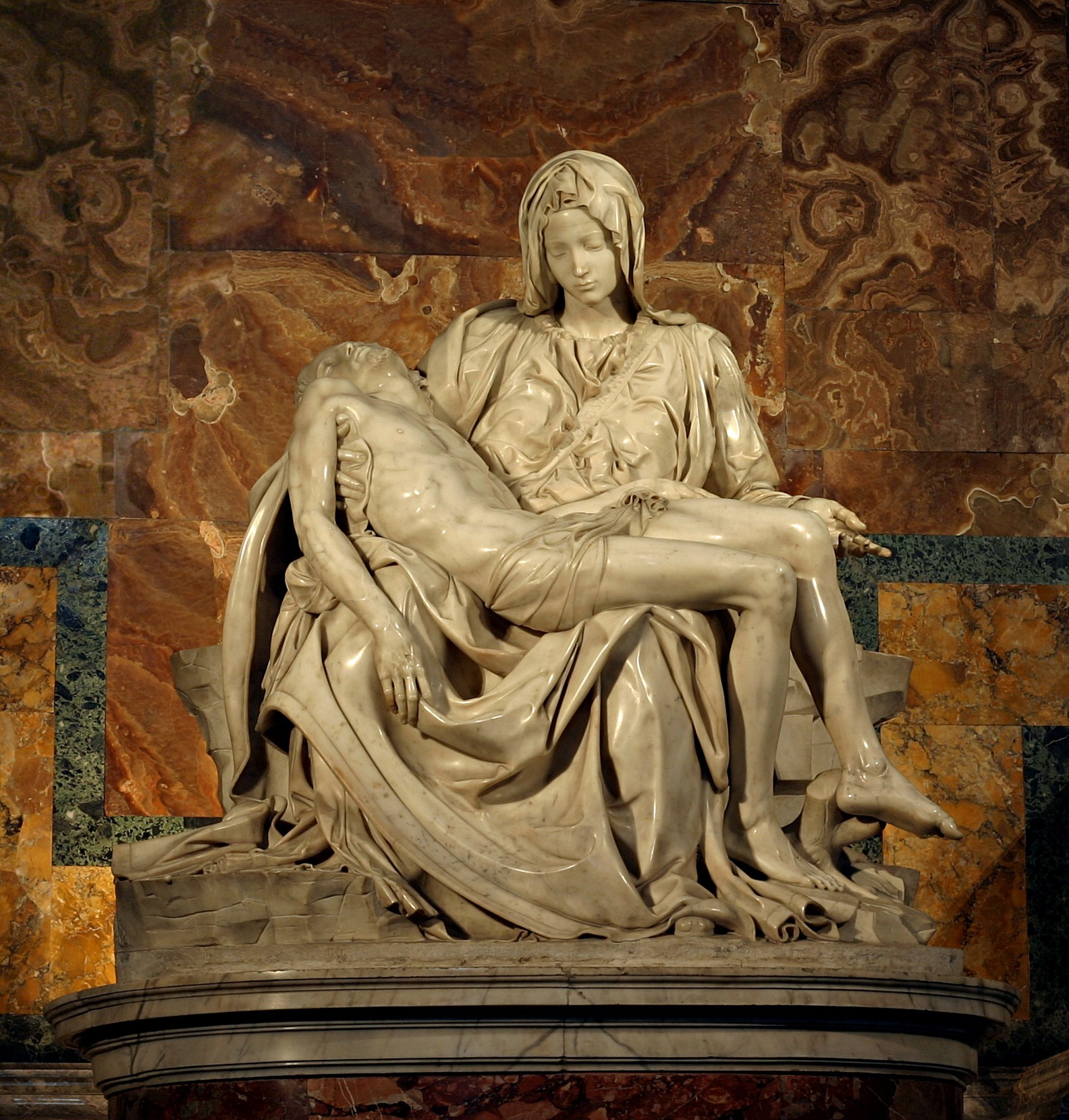
Michelangelo's Pietà, commissioned by Cardinal Bilhères for the Chapel of St. Petronilla, the chapel of the King of France in St. Peter's Basilica.

In gratitude for his service, Louis XI had him elected Bishop of Lombez on 5 July 1473. He occupied this see until two days before his death. The king also named him temporary administrator of the Abbey of Saint-Denis. He was later unanimously elected as Abbot on 12 May 1474. This displeased Pope Sixtus IV, who had wanted Cardinal Guillaume d'Estouteville to become the abbot, so the pope initially withheld his approval, but eventually relented in summer 1475.

In 1477, Bilhères was Louis XI's ambassador to the Catholic Monarchs. After the death of Louis XI, the regent, Anne of France, appointed Bilhères to the Council of State. She named him president of the Court of Aids in 1483. In 1485, he was president of the Estates General held at Tours. He served as interim Keeper of the Seals of France on several occasions.

In 1485, King Charles VIII named him president of the Exchequer of Normandy. In 1489, he attended the parlement at which the king had the Duke of Orléans explain his conduct. He then served as Charles VIII's ambassador to the Holy Roman Empire. In 1491, he became French ambassador to the Holy See in Rome. He was coadjutor bishop of Santes from 2 December 1491 until August 1492.

Charles VIII recommended that the pope make Bilhères a cardinal, and, before his death, Pope Innocent VIII named him governor of Rome. Pope Alexander VI then made him a cardinal priest in the consistory of 20 September 1493. He received the red hat and the titular church of Santa Sabina on 23 September 1493.

He accompanied King Charles VIII in his entrance in Rome on 31 December 1494 at the start of the Italian War of 1494–1498. On 19 May 1495 the king sent him to negotiate with the pope, but these negotiations were unsuccessful. He then accompanied the king on his crossing to Rome on 1 June 1495.

On 26 October 1496 he was named Bishop of Condom in commendam and on 14 February 1498 Bishop of Viviers in commendam; he occupied both of these sees until his death.

In 1498, he commissioned Michelangelo to sculpt his Pietà for the Chapel of Santa Petronilla, the chapel of the King of France in St. Peter's Basilica.

He died in Rome on 6 August 1499. He is buried in the Chapel of St. Petronilla in St. Peter's Basilica.
