= Changankulangara =

- town
- Location in Kerala, India Changankulangara (India)
- Coordinates: 9°8′0″N 76°30′0″E
- Country: India
- State: Kerala
- District: Kollam

Languages
  - Official: Malayalam, English
- Time zone: UTC+5:30 (IST)
- PIN: 690526
- Telephone code: 0476
- Vehicle registration: KL-02, KL-23
- Nearest city: Oachira
- Lok Sabha constituency: Kollam
- Climate: good weather all seasons (Köppen)

Changankulangara is a small village in Oachira Panchayath in Kollam district of Kerala, India. Its Changankulangara Sree Mahadevar Temple is one of the ancient temples in South India and one of the 108 Shiva Temples installed by the Lord Parasurama.
