= St. George's Church, Chathannoor =

Orthodox Syrian Church in India

Coordinates: 8.863°N 76.7199°E

St George Orthodox Church, Chathannoor, known locally as Chathannoor Valiya Palli, is a parish of the Thiruvananthapuram (Trivandrum) Diocese of the Malankara Orthodox Syrian Church. "Chathannoor Marthamariyam Suriyani Pally," as it was called in the ancient days, was built around AD 1755. One of the largest churches in South Kerala, it is the oldest church in Chathannoor and mother church to the churches in the Chathannoor region.

Notable works in the church include a mural featuring the patron, Saint George (Geevarghese Sahada), dating to 1792; the Chathannoor Panchangam, which has entries in Tamil and Malayalam; and a picture of a Mass in 1861 by Lt. Col. Stevenson of the British Army of Geevarghese Yakoob Kattanar offering up his sword.
