= Thiruvonam =

- town panchayat
- Interactive map of Thiruvonam
- Country: India
- State: Tamil Nadu
- District: Thanjavur

Languages
  - Official: Tamil
- Time zone: UTC+5:30 (IST)

Thiruvonam is a Taluk town in Thanjavur district in the Indian state of Tamil Nadu

== Geography ==
Thiruvonam is located at 10.30°N 79.10°E. It has an average elevation of 36 metres (120 feet).

== Demographics ==
Thiruvonam is a small town located south of Thanjavur, with an approximate population of 1,000 residents. It serves as the administrative center of the Thiruvonam Panchayat Union, which encompasses more than 20 surrounding villages, extending as far as Mariamman Kovil, a suburb on the northeastern outskirts of Thanjavur.

The Panchayat Union is currently represented by Councillor T. Thangadurai. Thiruvonam holds historical significance dating back to the early 11th century A.D., and was considered an important pilgrimage site during the Chola dynasty.

The town is known for its local culture, particularly the Muthu Thangappa Football Club and the annual temple festivals dedicated to Muthumariamman, both of which are celebrated with great enthusiasm. Notably, Thiru Muthu Thangappa, a respected former Chairman of the Panchayat Union, is remembered for his leadership and contributions to the community.

== Politics ==
Thiruvonam assembly constituency is part of Thanjavur (Lok Sabha constituency).

== See also ==
Onam
