= Peroor =

- Village
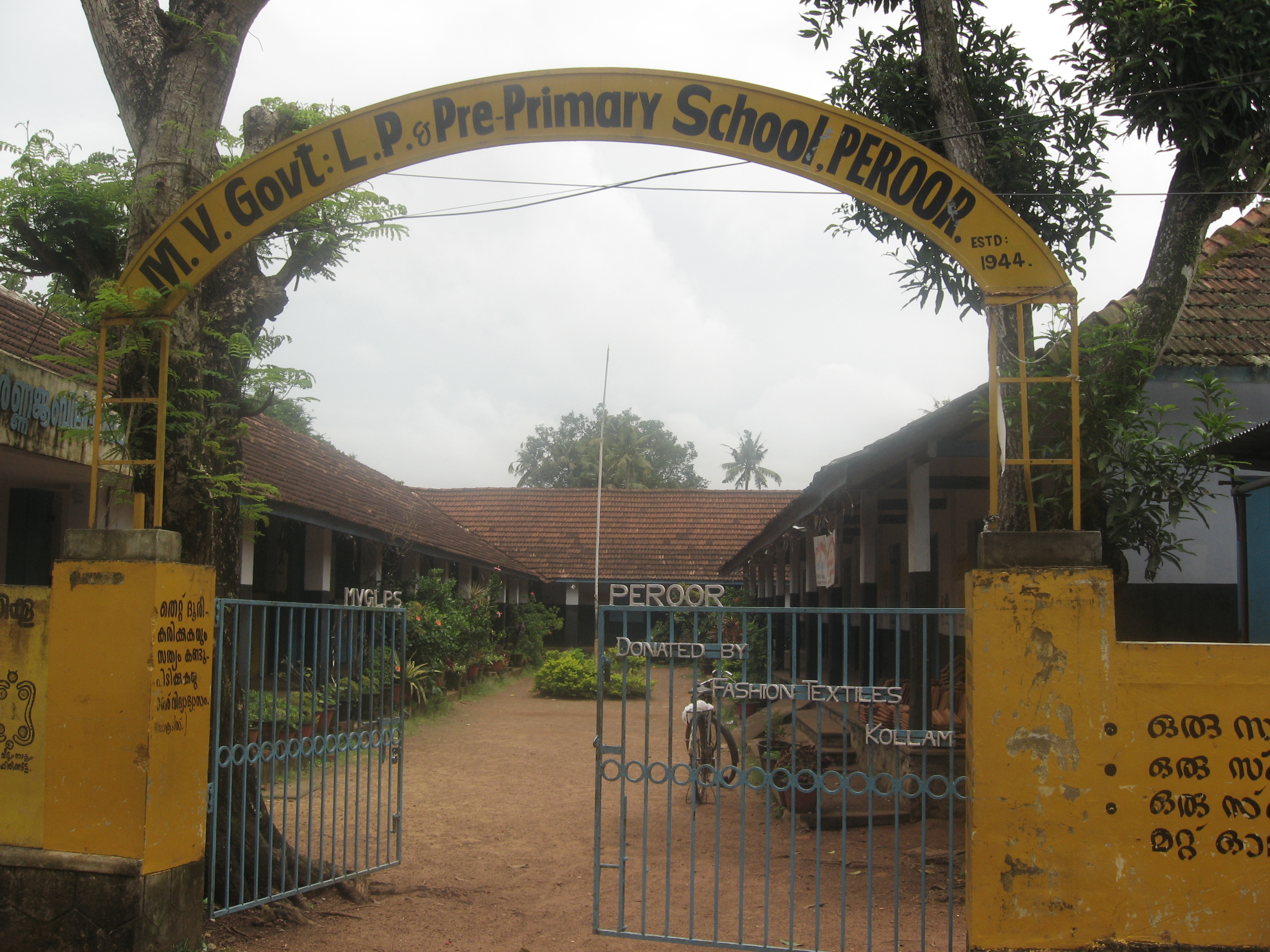
- Interactive map of Peroor
- Coordinates: 9°38′0″N 76°34′0″E
- Country: India
- State: Kerala
- District: Kottayam

Government
  - Body: Ettumanoor Municipality and Village office Peroor

Population (2011)
  - Total: 18,691

Languages
  - Official: Malayalam, English
- Time zone: UTC+5:30 (IST)
- PIN: 686637
- Telephone code: 0481
- Vehicle registration: KL-5
- Nearest city: Ettumanoor
- Literacy: 100%
- Lok Sabha constituency: Kottayam
- Civic agency: Ettumanoor Municipality and Village office Peroor

Peroor is a village in Kottayam district of Kerala, India. It is located 3 km (1.8 mi) from the town Ettumanoor and contains more than five different settlement colonies.

== Demography ==
As of 2011, Peroor had a population of 18,691 with 4,583 families.

All major Kerala religious communities are represented within the village. In 2011, the literacy rate of Peroor village was 97.82%. The Christian Church of South India (CSI), pentecostals, Jacobites, and Catholics are all well represented. Hindu groups, including the Nair and the Ezhava, are the predominant groups. The Muslim population is relatively new to the area. A Muslim community was established in Peroor around 1998-99 near the MHC and Kariyattappuzha communities. The Dalits are the other major population and, like other urban areas of Kerala, Dalits in Peroor lead a middle-class life. Much of the population is educated and cultured.

The labor market is currently dominated by the construction industry.

== Landmarks ==
Some of the notable landmarks of Peroor include the St.Sebastian knanaya Church, the Global Marthasmooni Pilgrim Center, the Peroor Kavu temple, the Chalakkal Temple, and the Arayiram Temple. Aarattu, an annual festival that takes place on Thiruvathira, is performed at the Arayiram Temple. The ODESA (Organization for Dalit Empowerment and Social Activation) is also located in Peroor. The Meenachil River flows through the eastern part of the village. The Bhadrakali temple in this village is called Peroorkavu. A Seminary exists in Mannamala, a hilltop in Peroor. It is believed that the tribal community "Mannan" settled there. Later this Mannamala was in custody of the Vellapally family and they donated their 96-acres to the monastery. Kandanchirakkavala (Kandanchira junction) is considered the center of Peroor. The local banks are Peroor Service Co-op and State Bank of India.

== Etymology ==
The name "kandanchira" comes from an incident that happened many years ago. There is a part of the vast "Mundakappadam" (mundakan paddy field) in the area and a 'chira' (small, mud/sand check-dam) to prevent the rain water from Mannamala and other nearby sources from potentially destroying the paddy cultivation of the 'mundakappadam.' The chira was made of mud from the paddy field. One night some members of the upper caste killed a 'pulaya' (which is considered an untouchable caste) named "Kandan" due to a coal rivalry; the man was buried alive in the chira. Others found the body a while later, but, because of the culprits social status, none protested. Following the incident, the 'chira' which served as the burial site was labeled with the prefix 'kandan,' thus becoming 'Kandanchira.' In Malayalam "Kandam" means paddy field, from that Name Kandamchira came.

== Geography ==
A major portion of Meenachil River flows through Peroor which makes a borderline with another village named Neericadu.

== Administration and Politics ==
Peroor belongs to Ettumanoor Assembly constituency in Kerala Legislative Assembly and Kottayam Loksabha constituency in Indian Parliament.

== Notable people ==
- V. D. Rajappan
