= Valiyakulangara =

- town
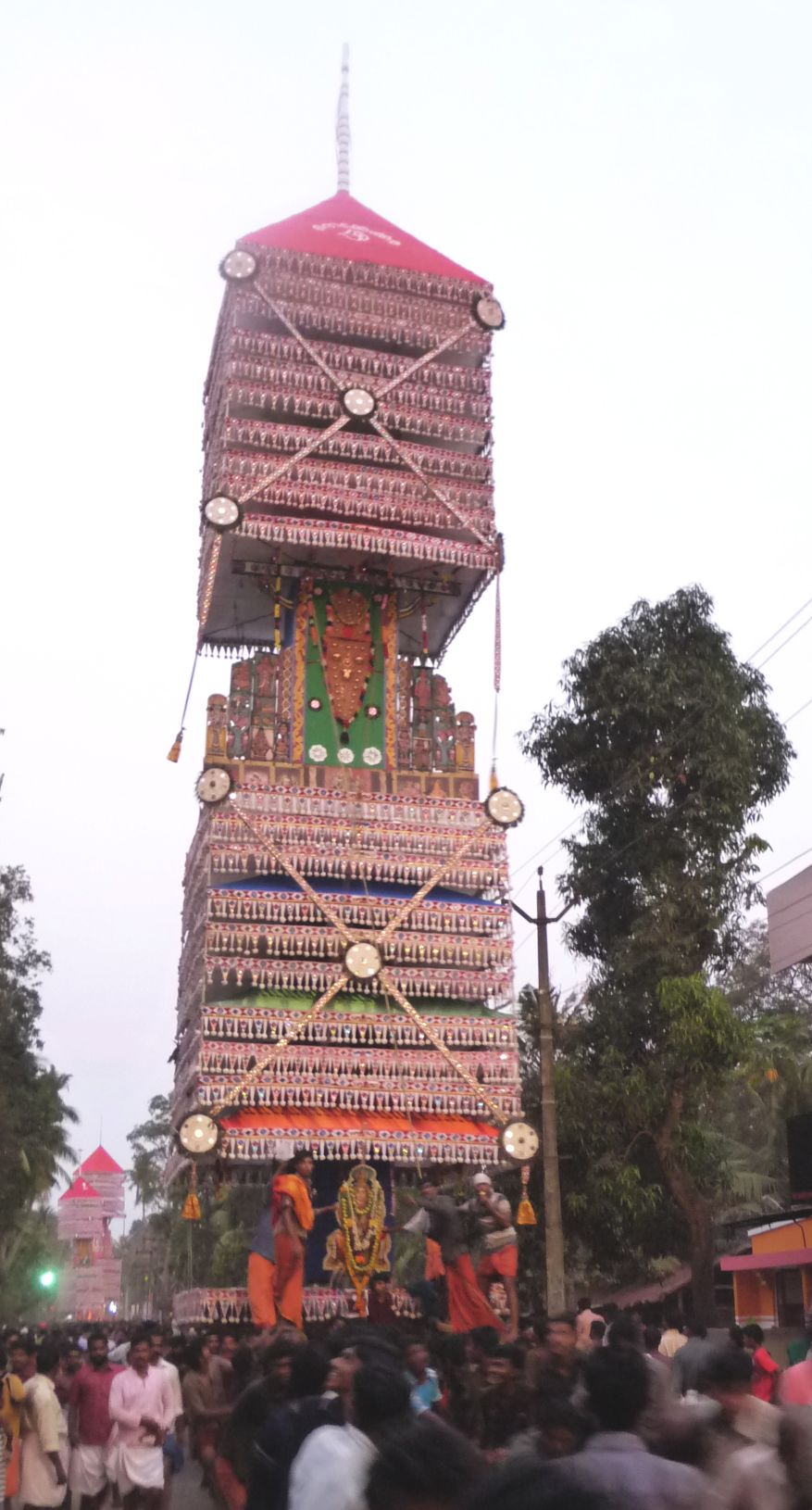
- Kettu Kazhcha festival
- Interactive map of Valiyakulangara
- Coordinates: 9°8′0″N 76°30′0″E
- Country: India
- State: Kerala
- District: kollam

Languages
  - Official: Malayalam, English
- Time zone: UTC+5:30 (IST)
- PIN: 690526
- Telephone code: 0476
- Vehicle registration: KL-23
- Nearest city: Oachira
- Lok Sabha constituency: kollam
- Climate: good weather all seasons (Köppen)

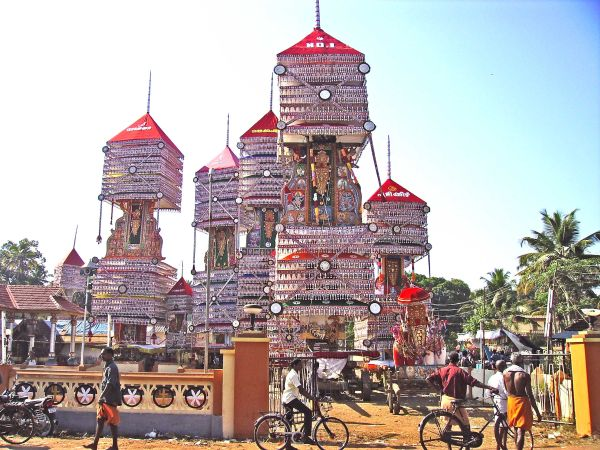
Valiyakulangara festival

Valiyakulangara is a small town in Alappuzha district in Kerala, India situated south of Oachira.

This village was part of Puthuppally Muri up to 1890 AD. After the 'Kandezhuth' this place was included in the Karunagappally taluk. Valiyakulangara is famous for a 'Devi temple' believed to be erected during the early centuries of Kollavarsham. Up to the beginning of Kollavarsham 1050 ( 1875. A.D.) only one annual festival was celebrated in the temple, called 'Meena Bharani' (celebrated on Aswathy Nakshathram of Malayalam month Meenam.). Later the 'Karakkaar' decided to celebrate Kumbha Bharani also on the Kaarthika Nakshathram of Kumbham. Now Kumbha Bharani was celebrated under the leadership of Thekke karakkaar and Meena Bharani was celebrated under the leadership of Vadakke karakkaar. Up to the beginning of 1900 AD the Meena Bharani was celebrated very colourfully by parading tall 'Eduppu Kuthiras' having 40 to 60 feet in front of the temple. On the festival day 'Garudan thookkam' had been performed on a special type vehicle constructed for the purpose by persons entrusted to perform the same. The first thookkam was performed on behalf of Thottathil Nampoothiri called 'Oorayma thookkam' as the Ooraalan. There after a number of thookkams would be performing for other families of 'Kara'. But later construction of Eduppu kuthiras and Garudan Thookkam were abandoned for unknown reas Now kettu kazhcha in this temple is known for their height about 105 feet tall...ons.
