= Oachirakali =

Battle reenactment in Kerala, India

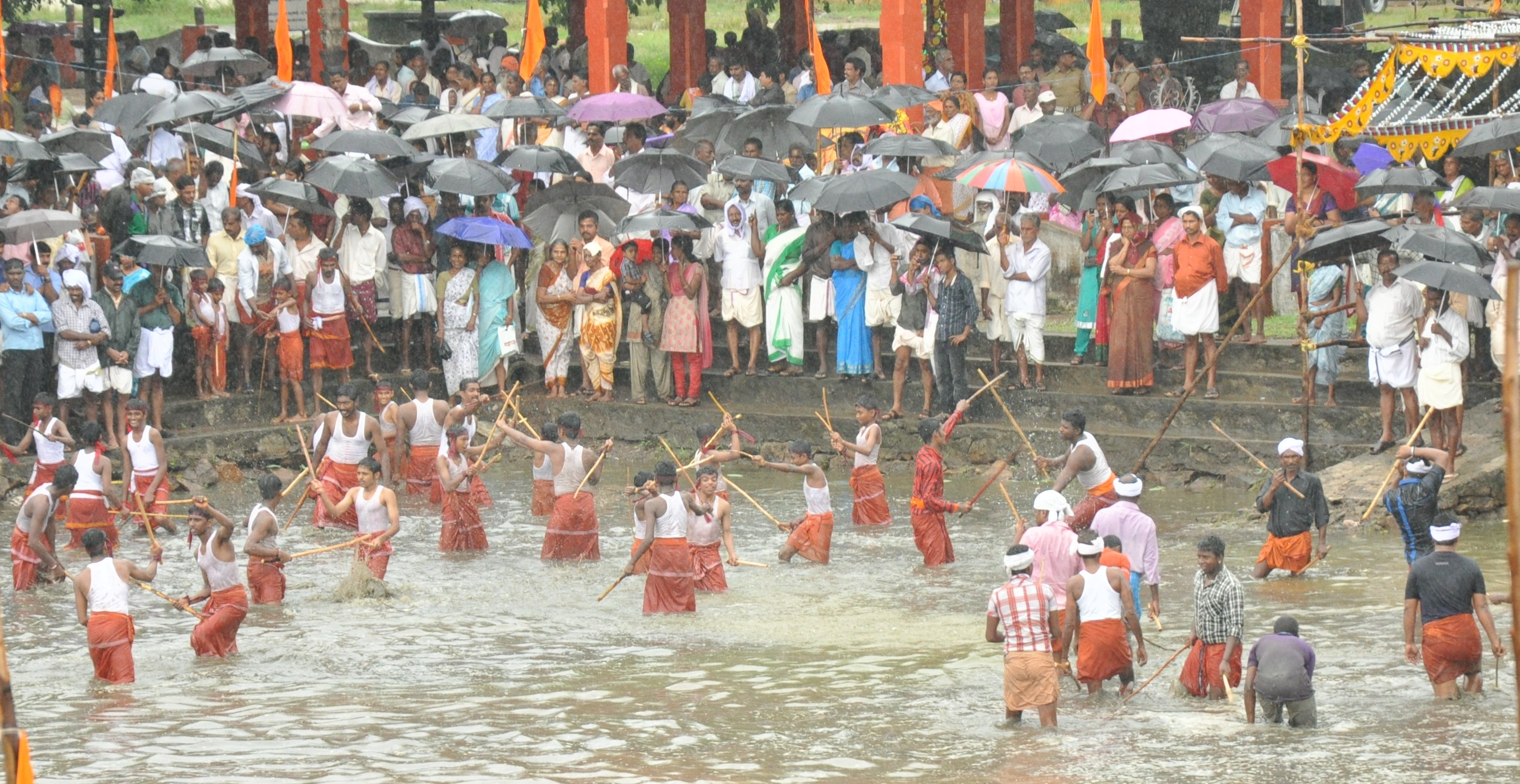
Oachira Kali festival in 2012

Oachira Kali is a festival that takes place in June in Oachira, Kerala, India. It is a mock battle between two groups, to the sound of drums, in a waterlogged field called padanilam at the Oachira Temple. Oachira Kali is celebrated in commemoration of the battle of Kayamkulam, fought between the Maharaja of Travancore Marthanda Varma and the Raja of Kayamkulam on the plains of Oachira Temple. The Padanilam or battlefield is a paddy field adjacent to the famous Oachira Parabrahma temple and the festivities are part of a ritual associated with the shrine.
