= Oachira Temple =

- Oachira Parabrahma Temple
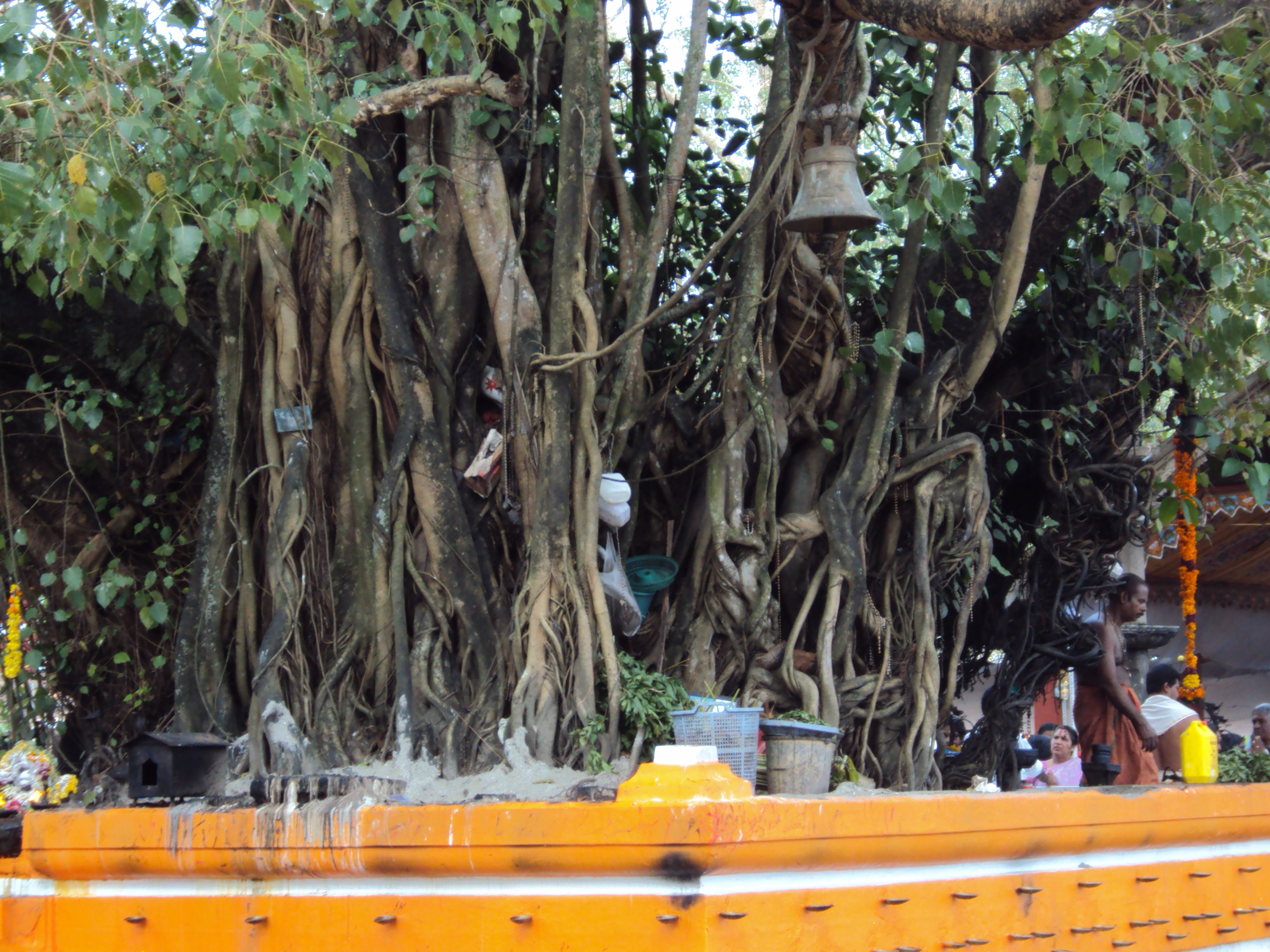

- Location in Kerala

Religion
- Affiliation: Hinduism
- District: Kollam
- Deity: It has no deity or idol but is dedicated to Parabrahma. Believed to be Lord Shiva.
- Festivals: Oachirakali, Panthrandu Vilakku, Eruvathiyetam Onam

Location
- Location: Oachira
- State: Kerala
- Country: India
- Interactive map of Oachira Temple
- Coordinates: 9.1360°N 76.5102°E

Architecture
- Type: It has no Sanctum Sanctorum.
- Creator: Velu Thampi Dalawa

Oachira Temple is an ancient temple located in Oachira in Kollam district in the South Indian state of Kerala. According to the Puranas, this temple is one of the famous sacred places of Kerala and India. Oachira is on the border of Kollam and Allappuzha districts, next to the National Highway 66. This temple is known "DakshinaKashi"(SouthaKashi).This very ancient pilgrimage center is centered on the ParaBrahma temple (that is dedicated to the Para Brahman (or Param Brahman) or Ohmkaram, the Universal Consciousness), and covers thirty-six acres of land.The Vethalamkunnu Parabrahma Temple is the origin of Ochira. Vethalamkunnu is also the most beautiful temple in Kerala, where devotees can perform puja directly.

Every year the Oachira Vrischikam Festival is celebrated during December and January. Oachirakali is a famous ritual performed here during June and it involves mock-fighting in muddy water by traditional martial art experts. And "Irupathattam onam" (28 days after Onam) is also celebrated. It is the festival of cattle. In this festival, huge "Eduppu kala" (gigantic idols of bull made of cloth&hay) are made. They are then pulled on giant wheels to the Oachira Temple from the site where they are made. Normally there are around 50 such structures. It is the biggest festival in "Onattu Kara", which is an area of a few square miles. Oachirakkali was actually a war exercise performed annually by soldiers of Kayamkulam Raja. Nearby, about 108 Kalaries were in 52 karas up to the beginning of the 20th century. Soldiers belonging to the above Karas met together at Oachira in the Malayalam month of Mithuna every year and performed war-like exercises. This is what is called Oachirakkali.

Ward and Conner, two British officials entrusted to survey of Travancore in the beginning of the 19th century, made their observations about Oachira in their report. In the report it was made clear that there was a very old and damaged temple on the eastern side of the Padanilam. It was also disclosed that there was a large reservoir at the center of the vast ground on which the temple stands, (which was now known as Kallukettuchira), and which is outside the temple compound today.

== Toponymy ==
There are many beliefs as to why this place is called Oachira. Some people believe that the place name came from the word Omkarachira and some others believe that the name is originated from the name Oymanchira. Also there are strong beliefs that the name derived from Uvachanchira as Uvachan means Lord Siva as per belief. All these assumptions are based on myths.

The real reason for arriving at the name of Oachira is possibly different. For that, we should understand the observations made by the two British officials, Ward and Conner, who conducted a survey in the erstwhile Travancore during the beginning of the 19th century. In their survey report, it was mentioned that there was a large reservoir at the center of the large ground called Padanilam. This reservoir (tank/pond/chira) was at the center of the Padanilam. This chira was used by the soldiers in olden days for bathing and for supplying water to the horses used in the war exercises. This chira might have been known in olden days as Onattuchira, as the place belonged to the Kayamkulam Raja who was also called the Odanattu Raja or simply Onattu Rajah. The Headquarters of Kayamkulam Raja was at that time at Krishnapuram, very near to the Padanilam (which is hardly 1 km away from Oachira). So it is believed that the word Onattuchira was gradually accepted as the place name and as time passed by further, that word was corrupted into Oachira. This is quite a plausible explanation as there are so many examples in known history about the transformation of place names.

The Oachira Temple is unique in the sense that it does not have covered structures for temples. People worship the Para Brahman (the original formless power lord shiva) under neatly preserved trees.

== Films ==
Malayalam film Padamudra, directed by R. Sukumaran and starring Mohanlal in the lead role, contains a reference to the beliefs of Ochira. The song ' Omkaramoorthy Ochirayil ' is very popular in this movie

== See also ==
- Temples of Kerala
- Chettikulangara Devi Temple
- Padanilam Parabrahma Temple
- Kayamkulam
