= Pazhanjikadavu =

- Village
- Location within Kerala
- Coordinates: 9°4′0″N 76°51′0″E
- Country: India
- State: Kerala
- District: Kollam
- Taluk: Pathanapuram

Languages
  - Official: Malayalam, Tamil
- Time zone: UTC+5:30 (IST)
- Vehicle registration: KL-02, KL-25, KL-77
- Nearest town: Pathanapuram Kottarakara Punalur
- Lok Sabha constituency: Mavelikara
- Assembly constituency: Pathanapuram
- Literacy: 93.63%

Pazhanjikadavu is a village situated near Pidavoor, Pathanapuram in Kollam District, Kerala state, India.

== Politics ==
Pazhanjikadavu is a part of Thalavoor Grama panchayat, Pathanapuram Block Panchayat and Kollam district Panchayat. It is a part of Pathanapuram assembly constituency in Mavelikkara (Lok Sabha constituency). K. B. Ganesh Kumar is the current MLA of Pathanapuram. Shri.Kodikkunnil Suresh is the current member of parliament of Mavelikkara.

== Geography ==
Pazhanjikadavu junction is situated in Pathanapuram-Kottarakkara (via Kura) road. It connects places including Parankimamukal, Nadutheri, Randalummoodu etc. to Pathanapuram. It is the main part of the village.

== Demographics ==
Malayalam is the native language of Parankimamukal.
