= Thalavoor =

Thalavoor Talavūr
- Village
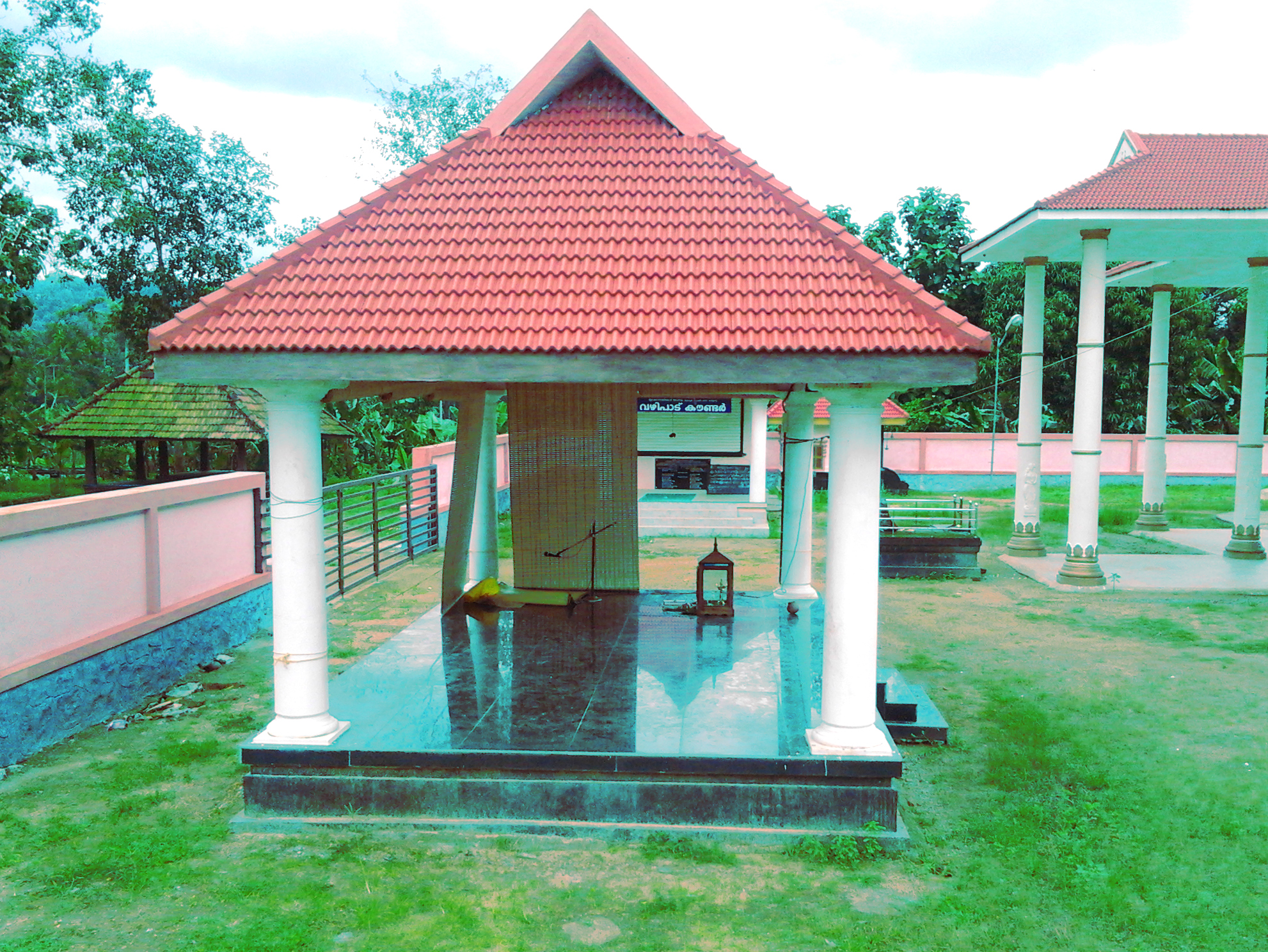
- Navarathri Mandapam
- Interactive map of Thalavoor
- Coordinates: 9°2′40″N 76°49′46″E
- Country: India
- State: Kerala
- District: Kollam

Government
  - Body: Gram panchayat

Area
  - Total: 33.67 km^{2} (13.00 sq mi)

Languages
  - Official: Malayalam, English, Hindi
- Time zone: UTC+5:30 (IST)
- PIN: 691508
- Telephone code: +91 475 .......
- Vehicle registration: KL-80
- Nearest city: Kollam
- Nearest town: Kottarakkara
- Sex ratio: 1069 : 1000 ♂/♀
- Literacy: 90.61%
- Lok Sabha constituency: Mavelikkara

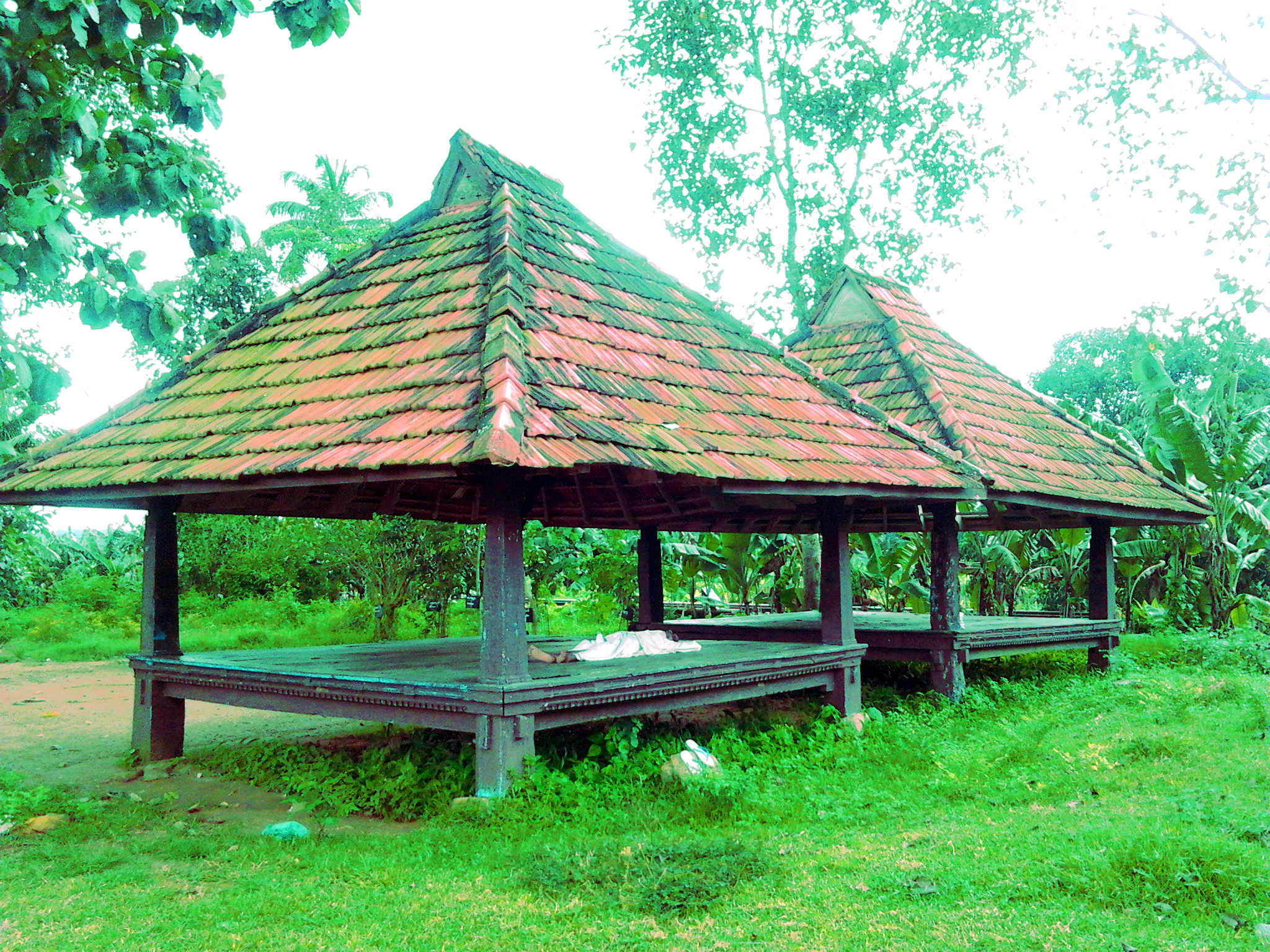
Kalathattu

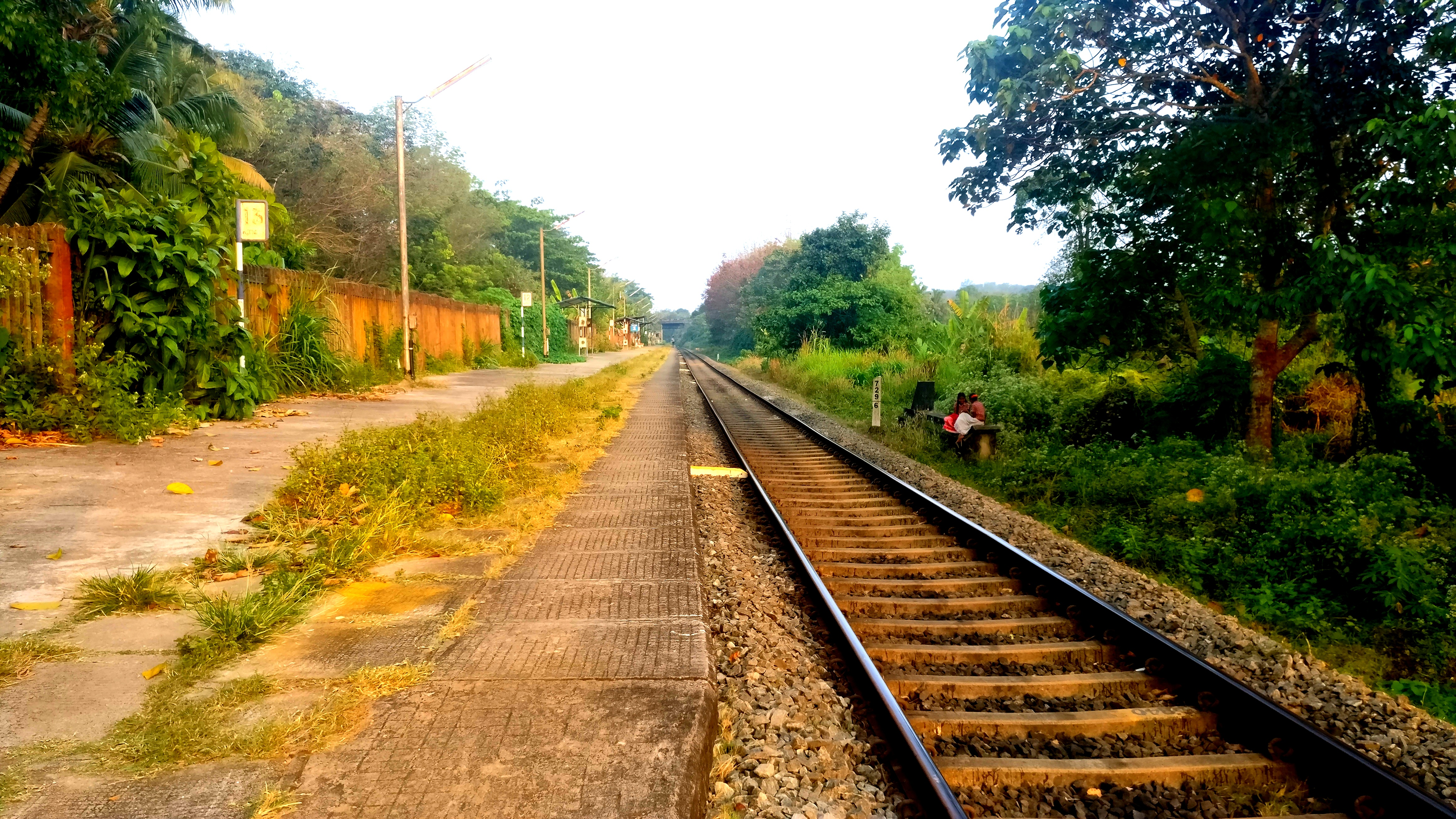
Kuri railway station in Thalavoor

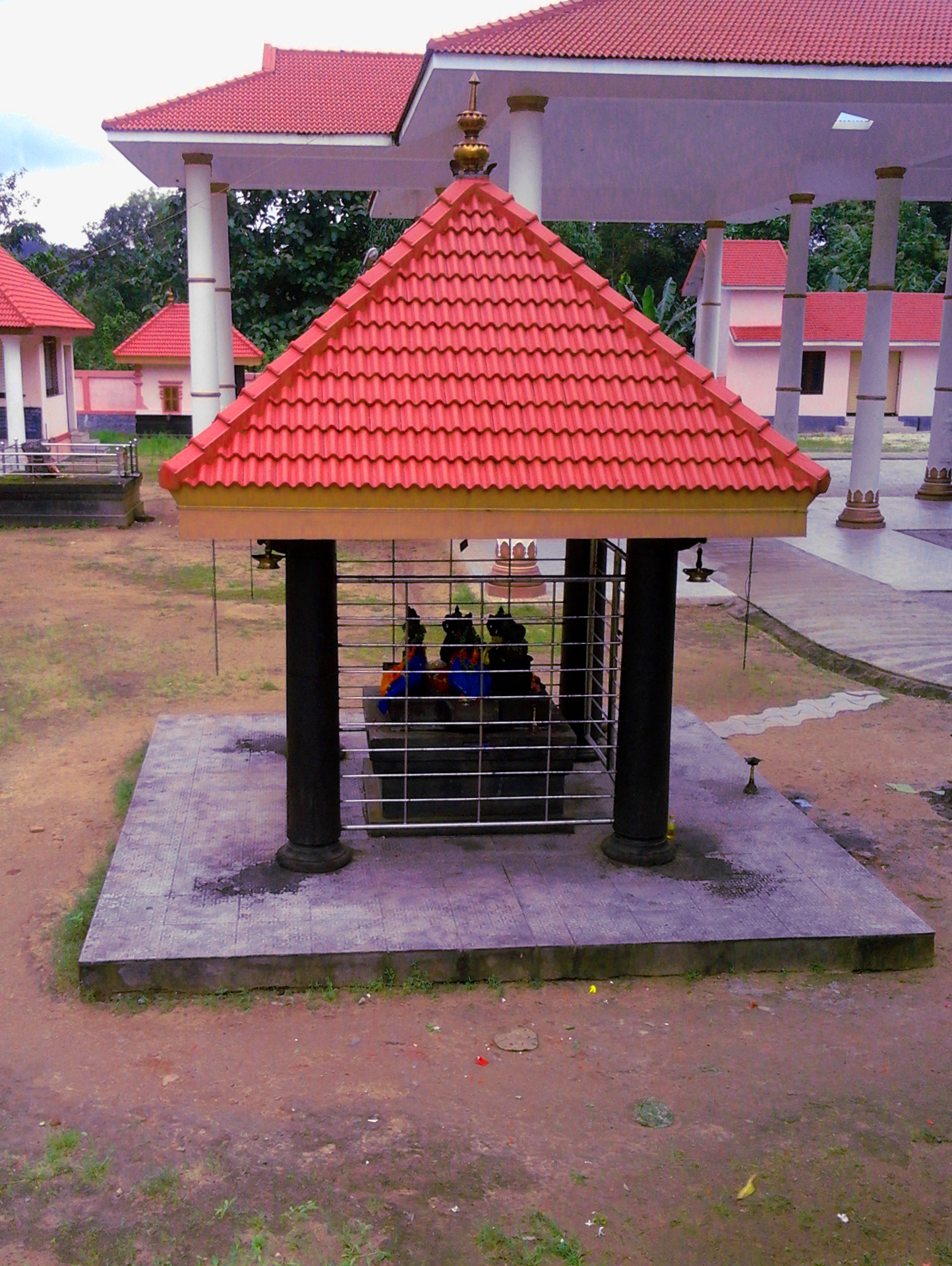
Navagraha Mandapa

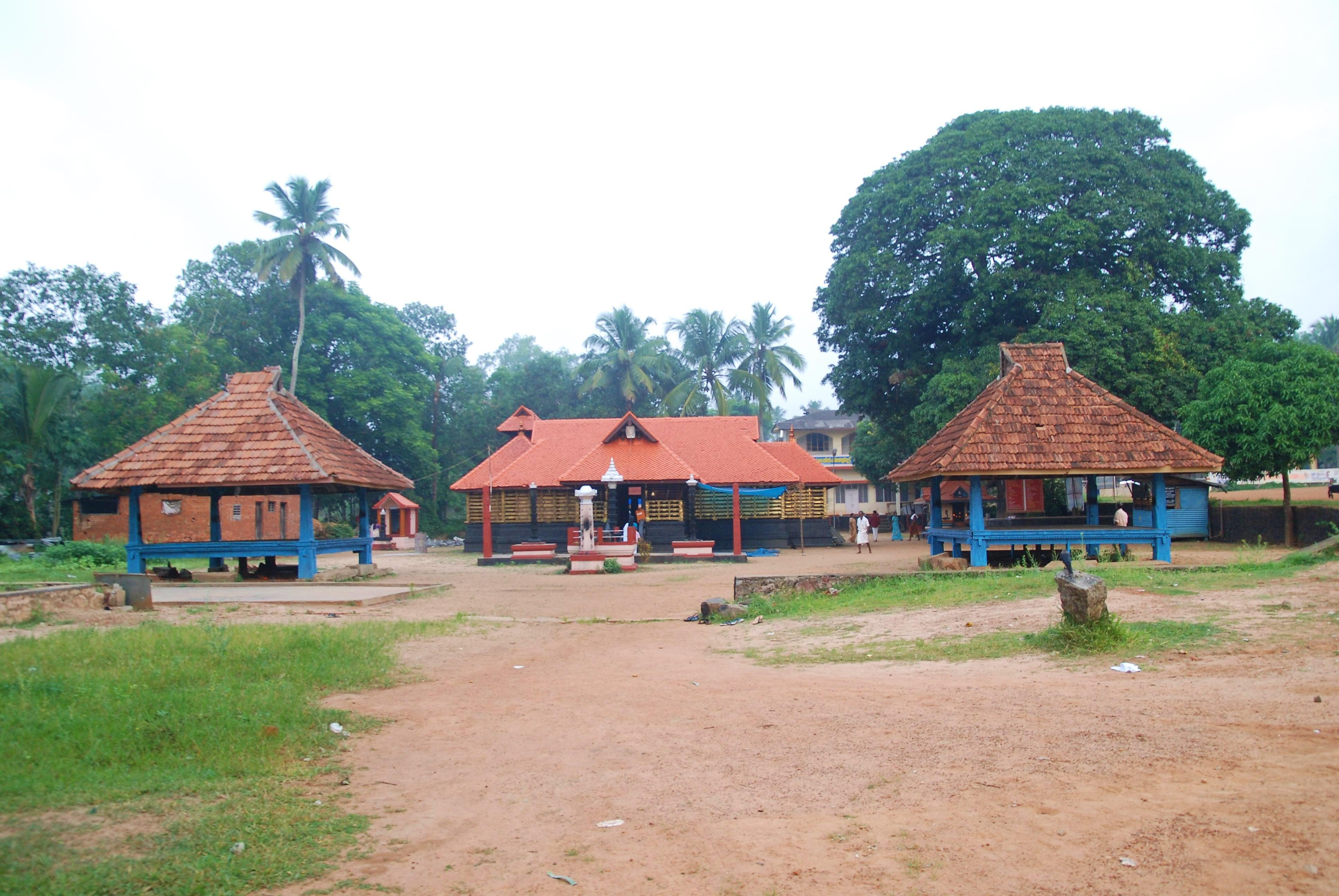
Durga Devi Temple

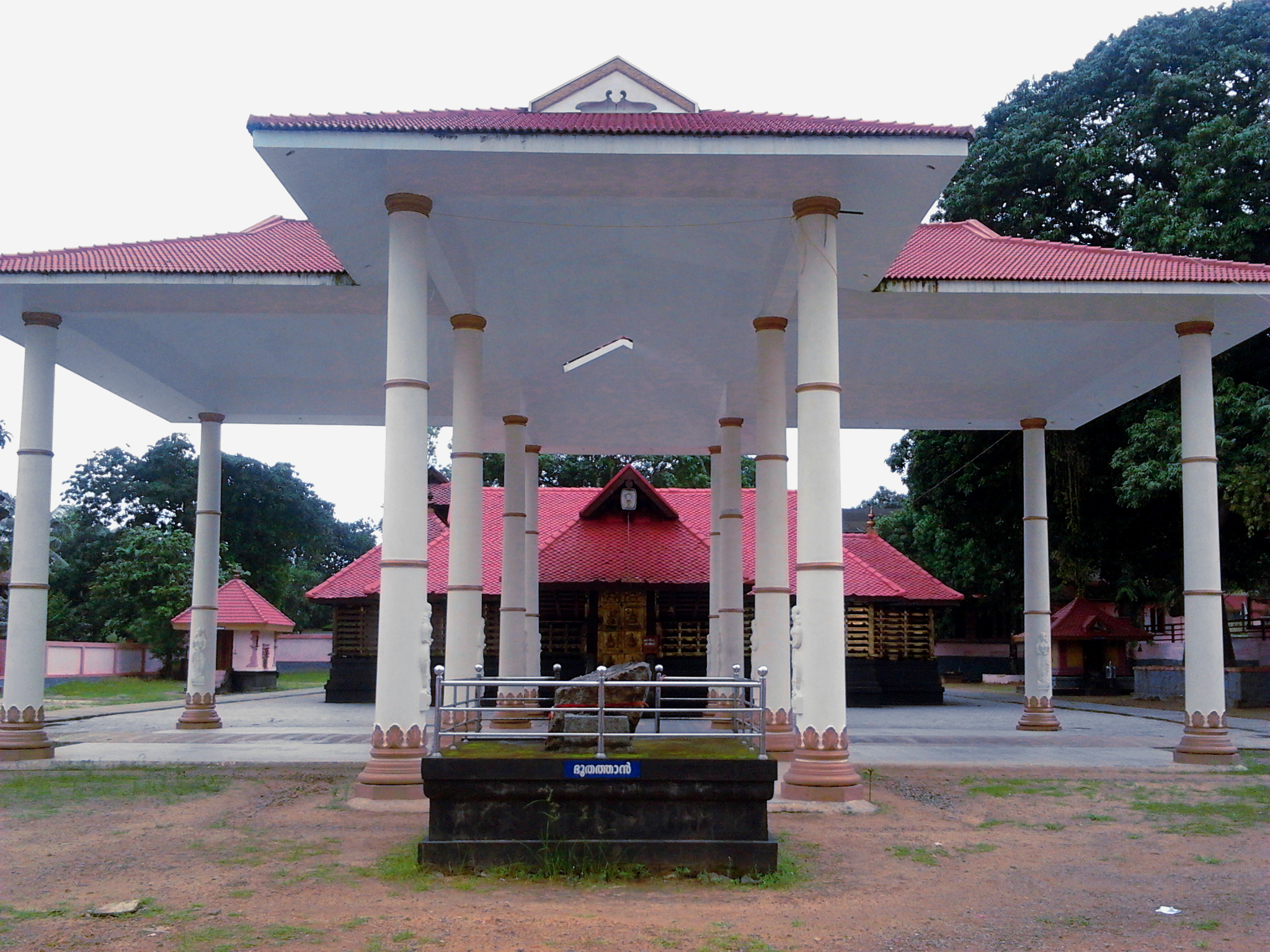
Temple gate

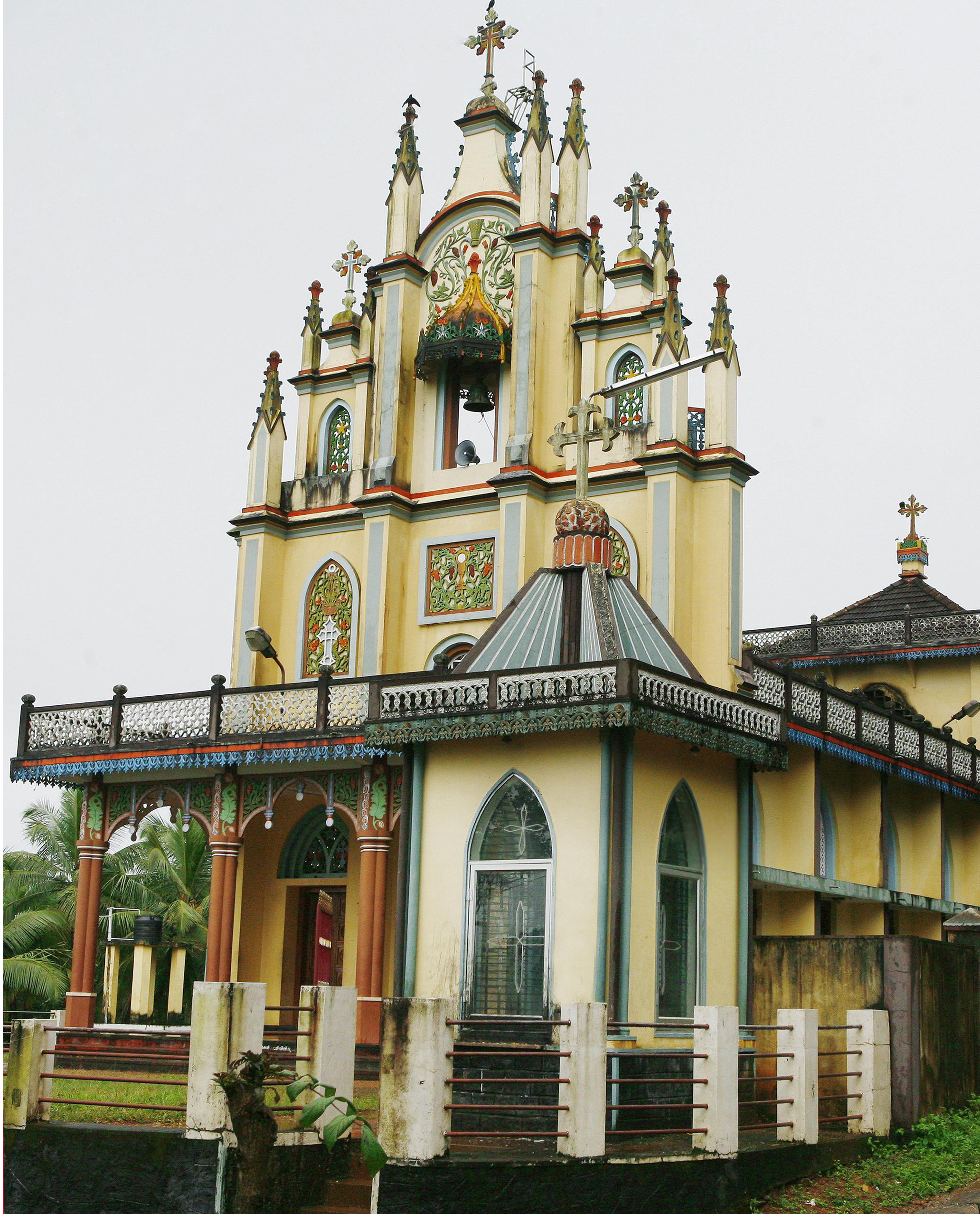
St. Johns Church

Thalavoor is a village located in the district of Kollam in the Kerala state of India. It is 77 km to the north of the State Capital, Thiruvananthapuram, and 28 km to the east of District Capital, Kollam. Thalavoor village is bordered by Pattazhy village to the north, Pidavoor village to the north-east, Vilakkudy village to the south-east, Melila village to the south and Mylom village to the west. Thalavoor is a part of Pathanapuram Block Panchayat

== History ==
In earlier times, this land was a part of Elayadathu Swarupam, a principality ruled by a branch of the Travancore royal family. Kottarakkara was the capital of Elayadathu Swarupam.

== Etymology ==
Up to 18th century, this land was a part of "Ilayidathu Swaroopam". At that time, most of the leaders (Malayalam: Thalavanmaar) in the Ilayidathu Swaroopam were from this place. They headed various departments of this royal dynasty. Hence this place came to be known as "Thalavoor", meaning "Thalavanmaarude Ooru" i.e. "The Place of Leaders".

== Geography ==
=== Geographical location ===
Latitude: 9°2'40"N

Longitude: 76°49'46"E

=== Sectors of land ===
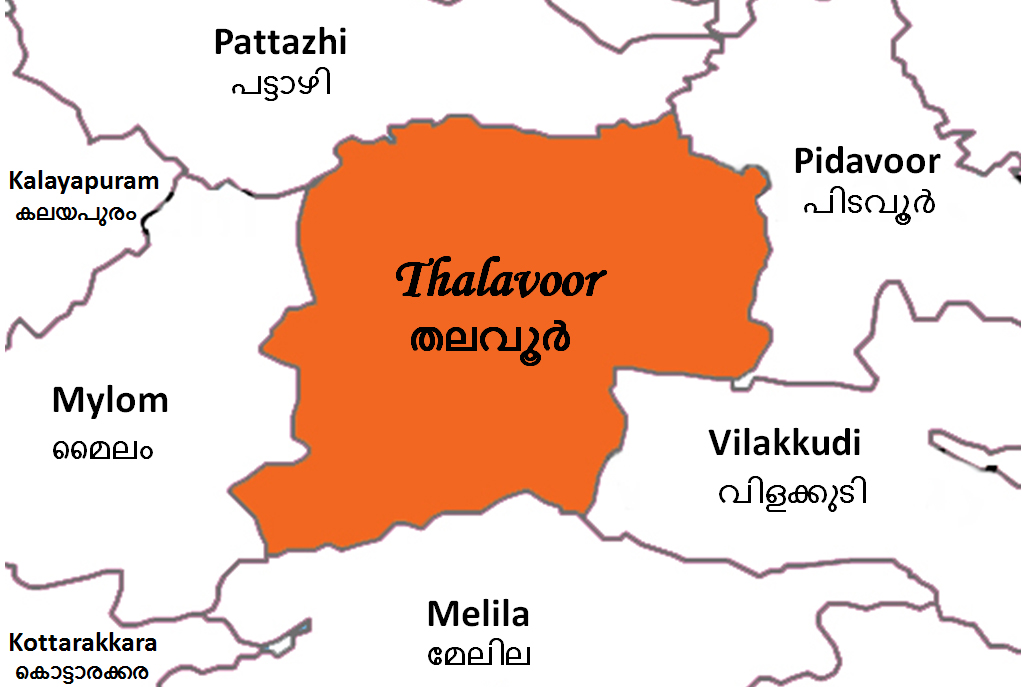
Outline map of Thalavoor village

The land of thalavoor is traditionally divided into six zones.

- Pandithitta (North-West Zone of Thalavoor)
- Manjakkala (North-East Zone of Thalavoor)
- Nadutheri (Central Zone of Thalavoor)
- Njarakkadu (South-East Zone of Thalavoor)
- Kura (South-West Zone of Thalavoor)
- Vadacodu (South-West Zone of Thalavoor)
- Aringada (South Zone of Thalavoor)

== Governance ==
Thalavoor, like other parts of India, is governed by different levels of government such as the three tiers of 'Panchayatraj', namely Village, Block and Jilla and, of course, the state and central governments. The revenue and land administration has the village as the basic unit.

Wards of Thalavoor Gramapanchayath;

Ward no.	Ward name	Ward member
1	Pandithitta	Anu Xavier Kadakampallil
2	Ambalanirappu	Rajesh V.
3	Tathamangalam	Shinu
4	Meleppura	Annamma Philip
5	Parankimammukal	Vatsala A.
6	Pazhanjikkadavu	Ponnachan O.
7	Panampatta	Biju T.M.
8	Pidavoor	Radhamohanan G.
9	Aruvithara	Radhakrishnan N.
10	Kamukumcheri	Santhosh Kumar K.R.
11	Chittashery	Suresh Kumar K.R.
12	Neduvannoor	Bindhu g
13	Manjakkala	Geetha Kumari
14	Nadutheri	Vijaya Lakshmi
15	Randalummoodu	Jyothi Lakshmi
16	Njarakkadu	Thalavoor S. Rakesh
17	Aringada	Deepa Teacher
18	Vadacodu	Ambili Dasappan
19	Alakkuzhi	Vijaya Kumar R
20	Kura	Jalaja Gopinath

== Places of worship ==
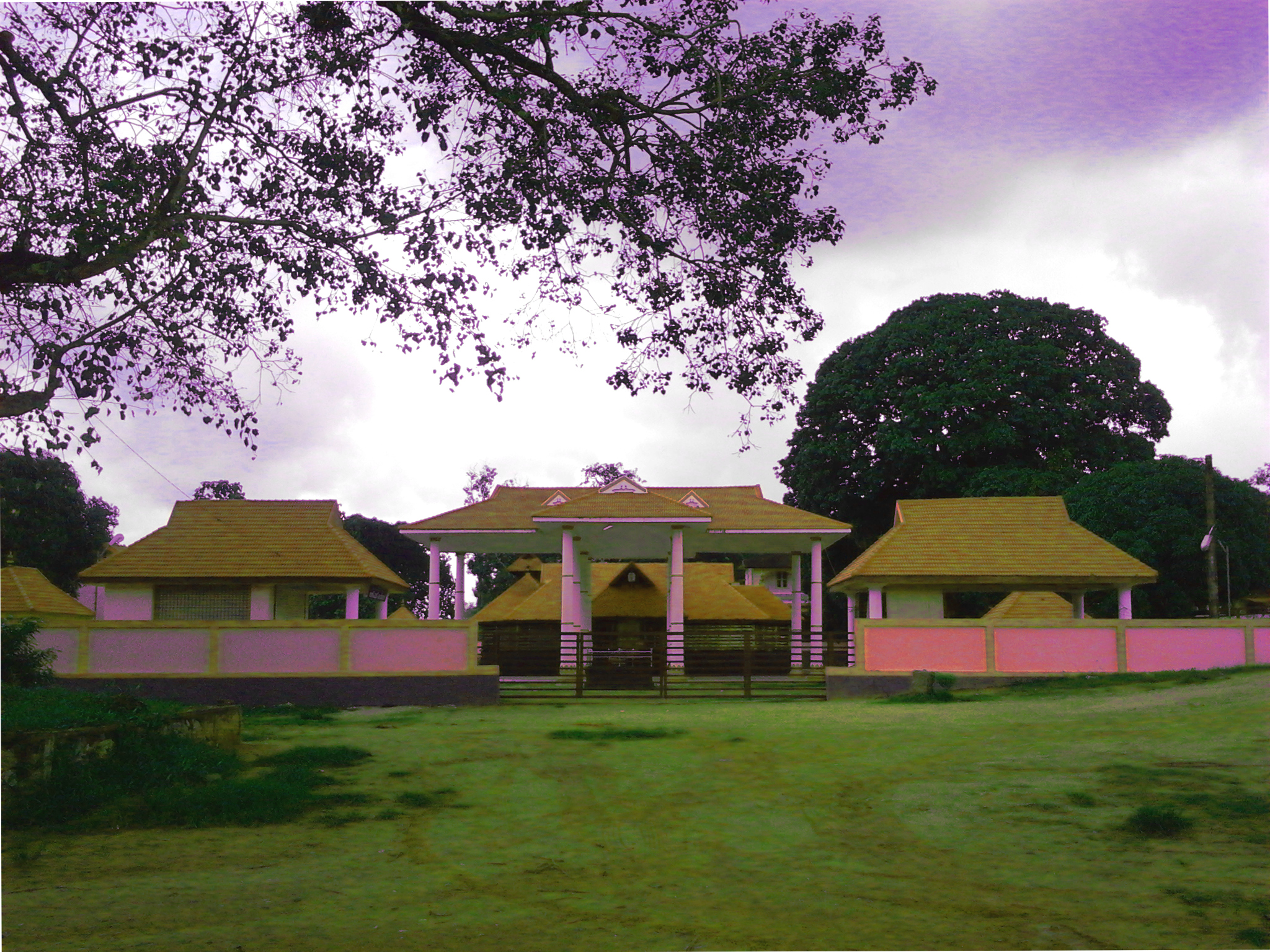
Sree Durga Devi Temple, Thrikkonnamarcodu, Thalavoor

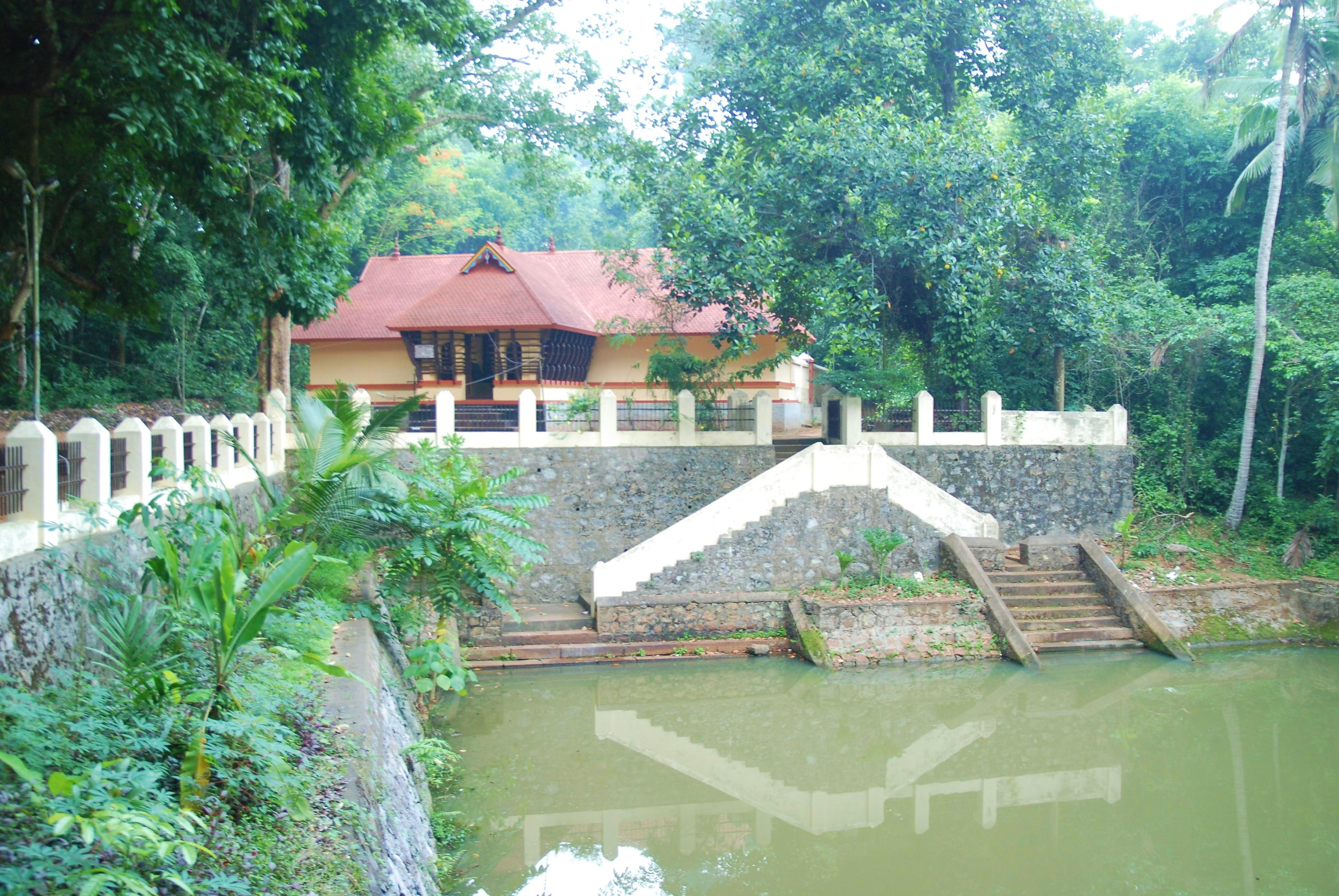
Sree Mahadeva Temple, Saptharshi Mangalam, Thalavoor

=== Hindu temples ===
- Sri Durga Devi Kshetram, Trikkonnamarcodu, Njarakkadu
- Sri Mahadeva Kshetram, Saptarshimangalam, Nadutheri
- Sree Krishna Kshetram, Nadutheri
- Sri Gurisimankavu Dharmashasta Kshetram, Pandithitta
- Thrikkara Sree Krishna Swami Kshetram, Kura
- Sree Mahadeva Kshetram, Chunakkara, Millumukku, Kura
- Sri Vasudevancode Kshetram, Vadacodu
- Charoor Bhagavathy Temple, Vadacodu
- Kaduvancode Bhagavathy Temple, Vadacodu
- Sree Durga Devi Temple, Aringada
- Sree Nagaraja Kshetram, Randalumoodu
- Sree Atoorkavu Devi Kshetram, Manjakala
- Sree Mahalakshmi Temple Manjakkala Pulimukku
- Sree Dharmasastha temple Manjakkala
- thaniyappan kavu sree mahadeva temple neduvannoor

=== Malanadakavu ===
Chundamala malanadakavu, Randalummoodu

=== Churches ===
- St. George Orthodox Church, Ambalathinnirappu
- Shalom IPC Hall, Ambalathinnirappu
- Palakkuzhi Marthoma Church Ambalathinnirappu
- Mar Semavoon Destooni Orthodox Church, Manjakkala
- Manjakala Trinity Marthoma Church, Parankimammukal
- St. Mary's Malankara Catholic Church, Manjakkala
- St. George Orthodox Church, Kulamudy
- St. Jude Orthodox Chapel, Santhi Bhavan, Nadutheri
- St. George Orthodox Church, Naduthery (East), Melepura
- Bethel AG Church, Nadutheri
- Marthoma Church, Nadutheri
- St. Stephen's Orthodox Church, Pandithitta
- Tabor Marthoma Church, Pandithitta
- Divya Rekshaka Latin Catholic Church (Romapally), Pandithitta
- Brethren Church, Pandithitta
- St. Mary's Malankara Catholic Church, Pandithitta
- C.S.I. Church, Randalummoodu
- St. Mary's Orthodox Valiya Palli, Randalummoodu
- St. John's Orthodox Church, Vadacodu
- St. John's Malankara Catholic Church, Vadacodu
- St. Mary's Malankara Catholic Church, Alakkuzhy
- Sacred heart latin catholic church, Aringada

== Educational institutions ==
- Government Lower Primary School, Vadacodu
- Government Lower Primary School, Kura, Thalavoor
- Government Lower Primary School, Njarakkadu, Thalavoor
- Government Lower Primary School, Pandithitta
- Government Upper Primary School, Nadutheri, Thalavoor
- Devi Vilasom Vocational Higher Secondary School and Devi Vilasom High School, Thalavoor
- Indira Gandhi Memorial Vocational Higher Secondary School, Manjakkala, Thalavoor
- Government W.L.P.S., Ampalathinnirappu
- Christhuraj I.T.C., Pandithitta
- Holy Cross Public School, Pandithitta
- Government Welfare LPS, Aruvithara

== Hospitals ==
- Government Ayurveda Hospital, Nadutheri, Thalavoor
- Primary Health Centre, Thalavoor
- Ayush Primary health centre, NHM, Homoeo, Thalavoor

== Nearby places ==
Kulamudy Orthodox Church on a foggy morning

- Kunnicode-4 km
- Pattazhy-6 km
- Pathanapuram-8 km
- Kottarakkara-8 km
- Punalur-12 km

== See also ==
- Kerala
- Kollam district
