= Nadutheri =

- Village
- Location within Kerala
- Coordinates: 9.0927°N 76.8612°E
- Country: India
- State: Kerala
- District: Kollam
- Taluk: Pathanapuram

Languages
  - Official: Malayalam, Tamil
- Time zone: UTC+5:30 (IST)
- Vehicle registration: KL-02, KL-25, KL-77
- Nearest city: Pathanapuram Adoor Kottarakara Punalur
- Lok Sabha constituency: Mavelikara
- Assembly constituency: Pathanapuram
- Literacy: 93.63%

Nadutheri is a village near Thalavoor in Kollam District, Kerala state, India.

== Politics ==
Nadutheri is a part of Thalavoor Grama panchayat, Pathanapuram Block panchayat and Kollam district Panchayat. It comes under Pathanapuram assembly constituency in Mavelikkara (Lok Sabha constituency). Shri. Jyothi kumar chamakkala is the current MLA of Pathanpuram. Shri.Kodikkunnil Suresh is the current member of parliament of Mavelikkara.

== Geography ==
The main part of Nadutheri is a junction in Pathanapuram-Kottarakkara (via Kura) road. It connects places Kura, Parankimamukal, Randalummoodu etc. to Pathanapuram.

== Demographics ==
Malayalam is the native language of Nadutheri.
