= Thamarakudy =

- Village
- Interactive map of Thamarakudy
- Coordinates: 9.051°N 76.798°E
- Time zone: UTC+5:30 (IST)
- PIN: 691560
- Telephone code: (0)474
- Vehicle registration: KL-02, KL-24
- Nearest cities: Kottarakkara, Punalur
- Lok Sabha constituency: Mavelikkara
- Assembly constituency: Kottarakkara

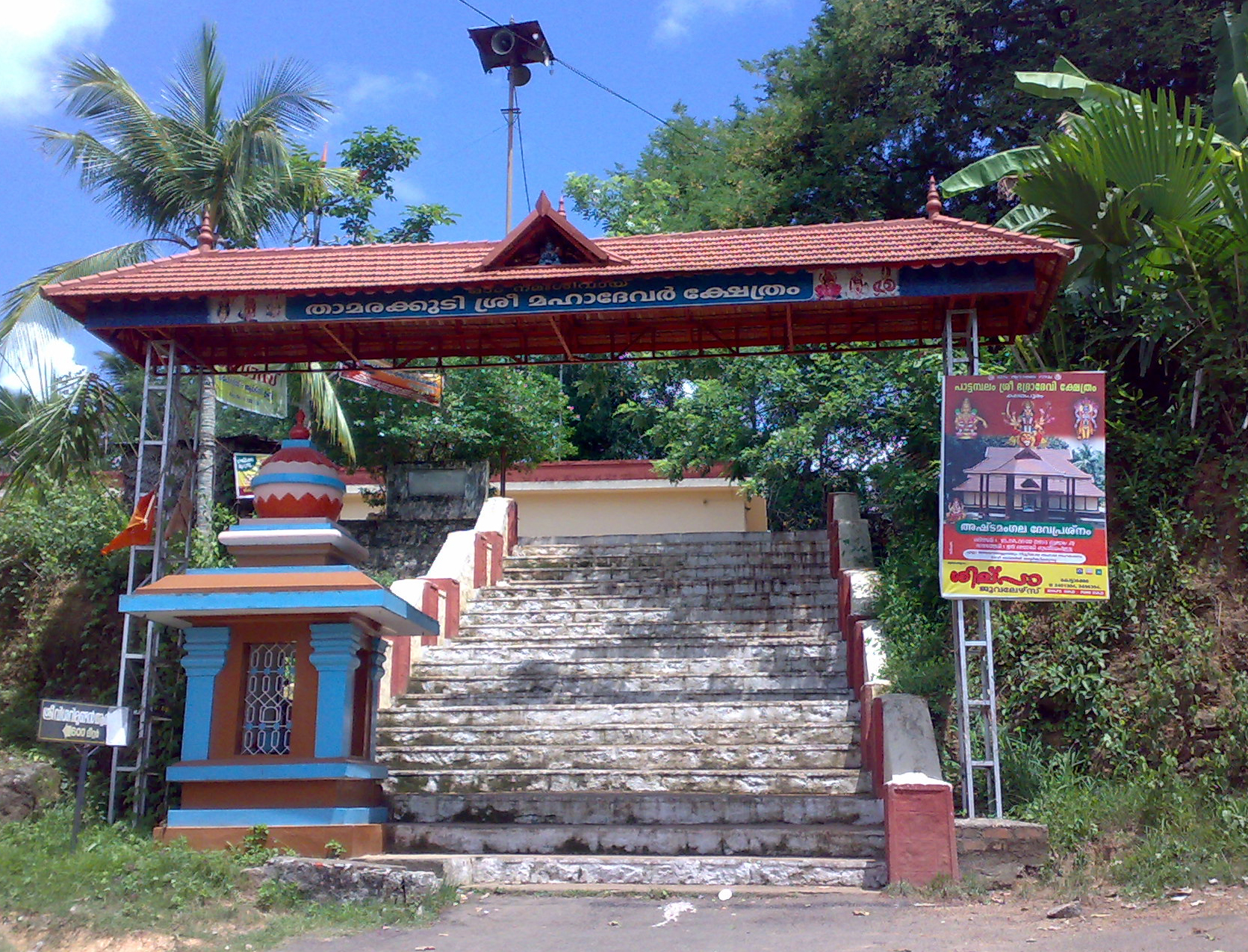
Thamarakudy Sree Mahadevar Temple

Thamarakudy is a village located in Kottarakkara taluk in Kollam District, Kerala state, India. It is located 34 km towards East from District headquarters Kollam, 6 km from Vettikkavala and 75 km from State capital Thiruvananthapuram. Thamarakudy is a part of Mylom Grama Panchayath. This place was hit in the news in 2013 by a Co-operative bank fraud.

== Nearby villages ==
- Enathu - 10 kilometres (via, Kalayapuram, MC Rd)
- Pattazhi - 6 kilometres
- Kulakkada - 8 kilometres (Via Kalayapuram)
- Melila - 10 kilometres (Via Mylom Kura, Thalavoor Rd)
- Kunnicode - 9 kilometres (Via Pandithitta, Thalavoor)

== Transport ==
- Bus Transport: Nearest town Kottarakkara is well connected to all parts of kerala. There are regular KSRTC bus services from Kottarakkara to Pattazhi via Mylom, Thamarakudy every 15 minutes.
- Railway stations: Nearest railway stations are Kura (5 kilometres) which connects Kollam Junction (34 kilometres), the nearest major rail head, and Chengannur (41 kilometres).
- Airports: Nearest airport is at Thiruvananthapuram (90 kilometres). Cochin International Airport is 175 kilometres away.

== See also ==
- Kollam
- Pathanapuram
- Pattazhi
