= Parankimamukal =

- Village
- Location within Kerala
- Coordinates: 9°4′0″N 76°51′0″E
- Country: India
- State: Kerala
- District: Kollam
- Taluk: Pathanapuram

Languages
  - Official: Malayalam, Tamil
- Time zone: UTC+5:30 (IST)
- Vehicle registration: KL-02, KL-25, KL-77
- Nearest town: Pathanapuram Kottarakara Punalur
- Lok Sabha constituency: Mavelikara
- Assembly constituency: Pathanapuram
- Literacy: 93.63%

Parankimamukal is a village situated near Pathanapuram in Kollam District, Kerala state, India.

== Politics ==
Parankimamukal is a part of Thalavoor Grama panchayat, Pathanapuram Block panchayat and Kollam district Panchayat. It is a part of Pathanapuram assembly constituency in Mavelikkara (Lok Sabha constituency). K. B. Ganesh Kumar is currently serving as the MLA of Pathanapuram. Shri.Kodikkunnil Suresh is the current member of parliament of Mavelikkara.

== Geography ==
Parankimamukal is a junction in Pathanapuram-Kottarakkara (via Kura) road. It connects places including Nadutheri, Randalummoodu etc. to Pathanapuram. It is the main part of the village.

== Demographics ==
Malayalam is the native language of Parankimamukal.
