= Panampatta =

- Village
- Location within Kerala
- Coordinates: 9.0927°N 76.8612°E
- Country: India
- State: Kerala
- District: Kollam
- Taluk: Pathanapuram

Languages
  - Official: Malayalam,
- Time zone: UTC+5:30 (IST)
- PIN: 691508
- Telephone code: 0475
- Vehicle registration: KL-02, KL-25, KL-80
- Nearest city: Pathanapuram Kottarakara Punalur
- Lok Sabha constituency: Mavelikara
- Assembly constituency: Pathanapuram
- Literacy: 93.63%

Panampatta is a place in Pidavoor village in Kollam District, in the Indian state of Kerala.

== Politics ==
Panampatta is a part of Pathanapuram assembly constituency in Mavelikkara (Lok Sabha constituency). Shri. K. B. Ganesh Kumar is the current MLA of Pathanpuram. Shri.Kodikkunnil Suresh is the current member of parliament of Mavelikkara.

== Geography ==
Panampatta is located in Thalavoor panchayat. Panampatta situated at a junction on the Pathanapuram-Kottarakkara road. Vellangadu bridge is one of the area's main landmark. Panampatta Akshaya Centre is situated nearby.Panampatta has three junctions: Kurisummoodu in South, Vellangadu in Central and Nehru Junction in North.
