= Elikkattoor =

- village
- Location in Kerala, India Elikkattoor (India)
- Coordinates: 9°2′0″N 76°53′0″E
- Country: India
- State: Kerala
- District: Kollam

Languages
  - Official: Malayalam, English
- Time zone: UTC+5:30 (IST)
- PIN: 689696
- Vehicle registration: KL-25
- Nearest city: Punalur
- Lok Sabha constituency: Mavelikkara

Elikkattoor is a village in India near Punalur, Kerala.

== Governande ==
Elikkattoor is part of Pathanapuram assembly constituency in Mavelikkara (Lok Sabha constituency). Shri. K.B Ganeshkumar is the current MLA. Shri. Kodikunnil Suresh is the current Member of Parliament of Mavelikkara
