= Punalur (disambiguation) =

Punalur is a town in Kerala, India.

Punalur may also refer to:

- Punalur railway station, a railway station in Kerala
- Punalur Suspension Bridge, a suspension bridge in Kerala
- Punalur Paper Mills, a paper mill in Kerala
- Punalur (Assembly constituency)
