= Panthaplavu =

Village in Kollam District, Kerala, India

Panthaplavu is a small village located in Pathanapuram, Kollam district, Kerala, India.
