= Elampal =

- village
- Interactive map of Elampal
- Country: India
- State: Kerala
- District: Kollam

Government
  - Body: Vilakudy Grama Panchayat

Languages
  - Official: Malayalam, English
- Time zone: UTC+5:30 (IST)
- PIN: 691322
- Telephone code: +91 475
- Vehicle registration: KL-25-
- Nearest city: Thiruvananthapuram
- Lok Sabha constituency: Mavelikkara
- Civic agency: Vilakudy Grama Panchayat

Elambal is a village in Kollam district of Kerala, India. It is known for its religious unity and festivals and rich heritage. Elambal means 'young' in Tamil. It lies on the Kollam-Thirumangalam National Highway (NH-744). The nearest town is Punalur. The pincode of Elampal is 691322. Elambal Government UPS under General Education Department of the Government of Kerala offers education from Standard I to VII. Elambal Service Cooperative Bank Limited and Federal Bank, Elampal (or Ilambal, as often pronounced) are the major banks in the locality.

== Places of worship ==
The village has two temples: Kottaram Aayiravally Devi Temple and Elampal Mahadevar Temple, which is one of the very old temples in Kerala. Experts says the temple's history dates back to the Sangha era. Elampal also has churches and mosques, including Jerusalem Mar Thoma Church, Church of God in India (full gospel) in Elampal and Elicode, St. Thomas Mar Thoma Church, Elampal, Mar Gregorios Orthodox Church Marangadu, St. George Orthodox Church, Elampal, St. Thomas Malankara Catholic Church, Thiruvazhy, Church of God.
