= Pattazhy Vadakkekara =

- village
- Interactive map of Pattazhy Vadakkekara
- Country: India
- State: Kerala
- District: Kollam

Population (2011)
  - Total: 15,160

Languages
  - Official: Malayalam, English
- Time zone: UTC+5:30 (IST)
- Vehicle registration: KL 80-

Pattazhy Vadakkekara is a village in Kollam district in the state of Kerala, India. It is separated from Pattazhi by the Kallada River.

Pattazhi Vadakkekkara is a part of Pathanapuram Block Panchayat and Kollam district Panchayat. It is entirely different from panchayath.

== Demographics ==
As of 2011 India census, Pattazhy Vadakkekara had a population of 15160 with 7082 males and 8078 females.
