= Kuri railway station =

Railway station in Kerala, India

Kuri Kura
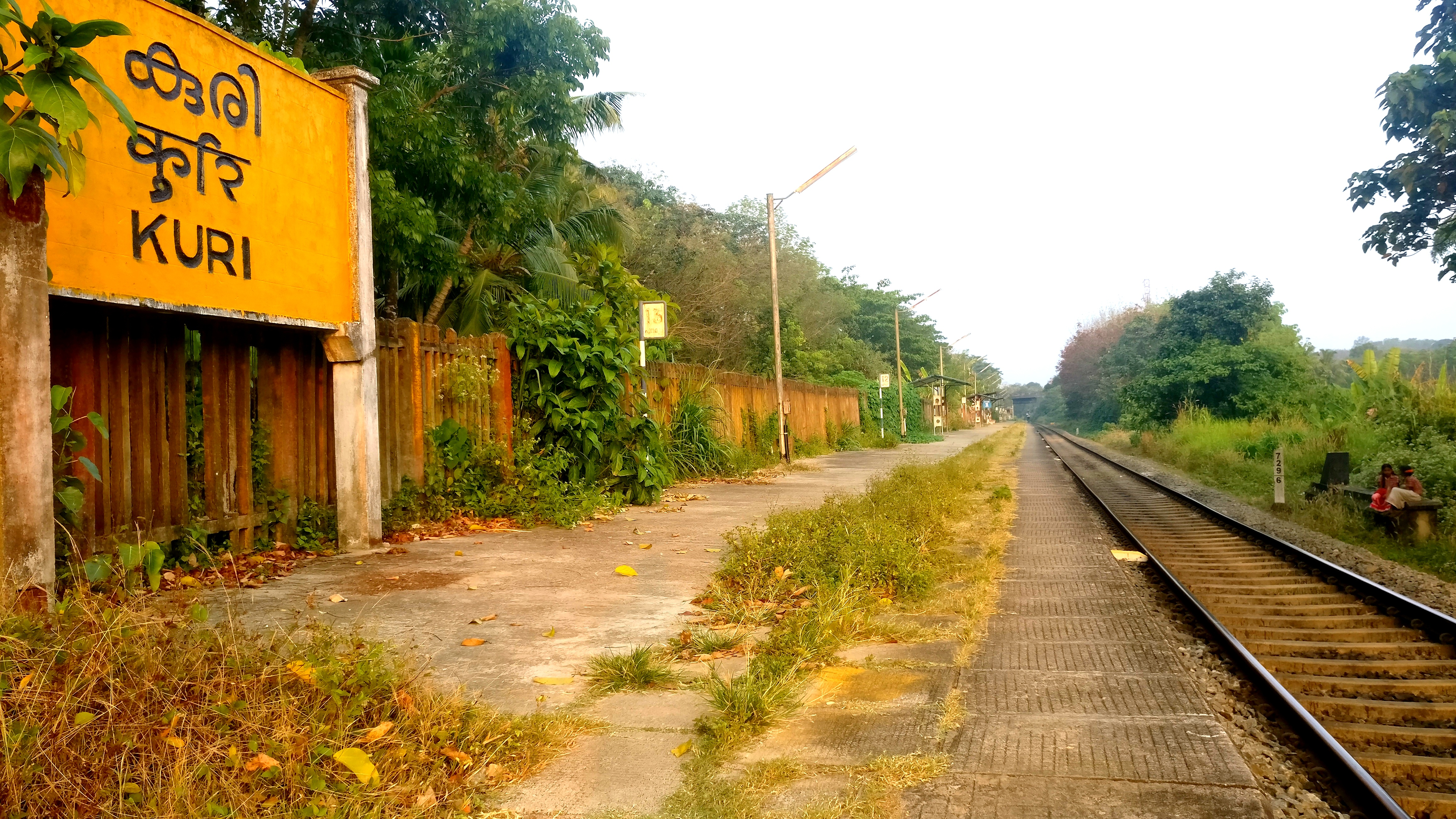
- Station name board and platform of Kuri railway station

General information
- Location: Mylom–Kura road, Thalavoor, Kollam, Kerala; India
- Coordinates: 9.034583°N 76.817160°E
- System: Regional rail, Light rail & Commuter rail station
- Owner: Indian Railways
- Operator: Southern Railway zone
- Line: Kollam–Sengottai branch line
- Platforms: 1
- Tracks: 1

Construction
- Structure type: At–grade

Other information
- Status: Functioning
- Station code: KIF
- Zone(s): Southern Railway zone
- Division(s): Madurai
- Fare zone: Indian Railways

History
- Opened: 1904; 122 years ago
Route map
Location
- Location within India Location within Kerala

Kuri railway station or Kura railway station (Code: KIF) is an 'HG 2' category halt railway station, situated at the Kollam–Sengottai branch line of Southern Railway, India. The station is situated between Avaneeswaram and Kottarakara railway stations in Kollam district, Kerala. The station is coming under Madurai railway division of Southern Railway zone. The nearest major railhead of Kuri railway station is Kollam Junction railway station.

== Significance ==
Kuri is one of the most neglected railway stations in India. Even railway authorities are forgetting sometimes to include this station in railway news and websites. This is the nearest railway station to Thalavoor Devi temple. Rural areas like Thalavoor, Mylom, Kura, Kulamudi, Alakuzhy, Thamarakudy in Pathanapuram/Kottarakara taluks are depending on this railway station.

== Services ==
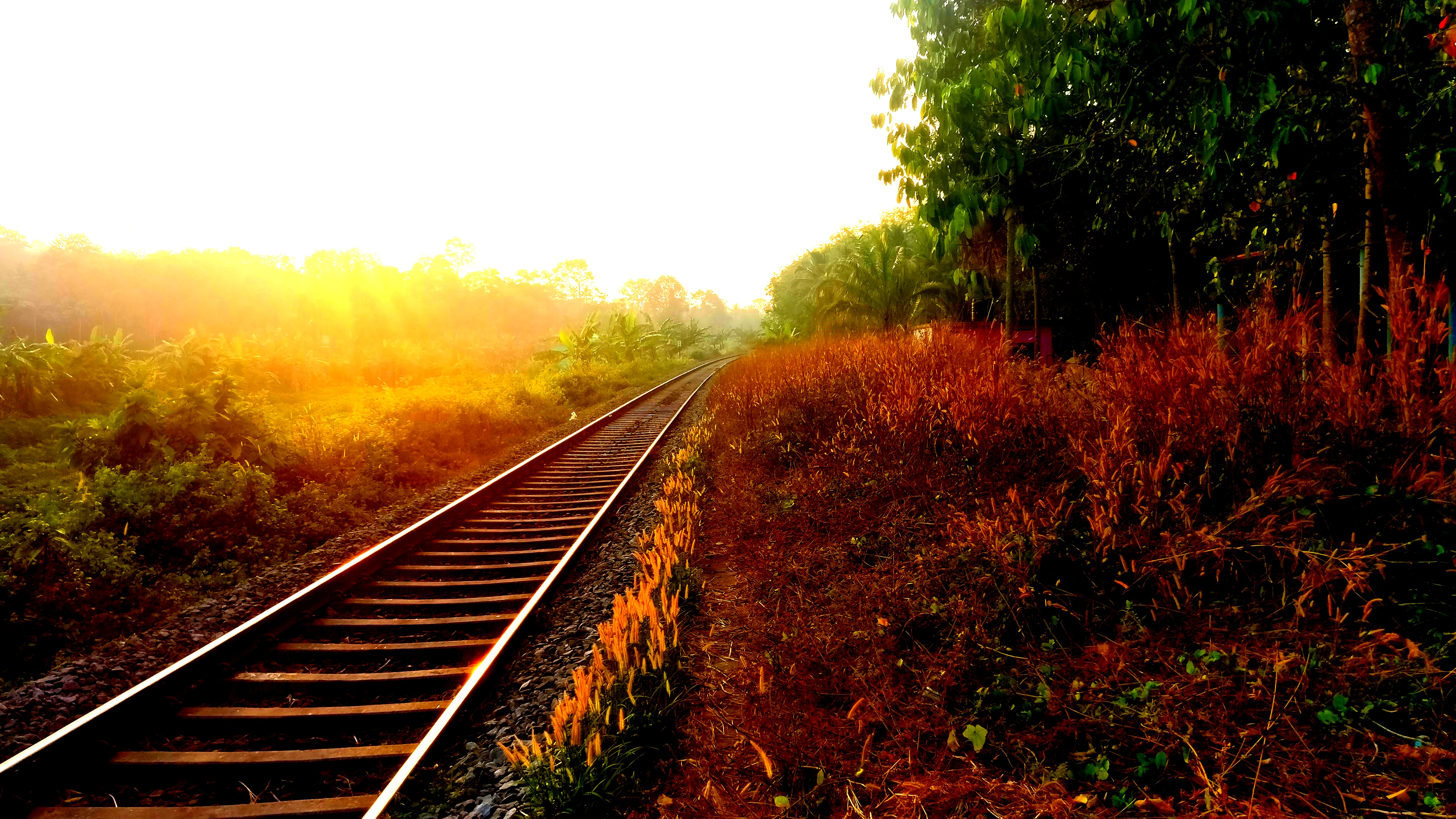
Railway line towards Kollam at Kuri

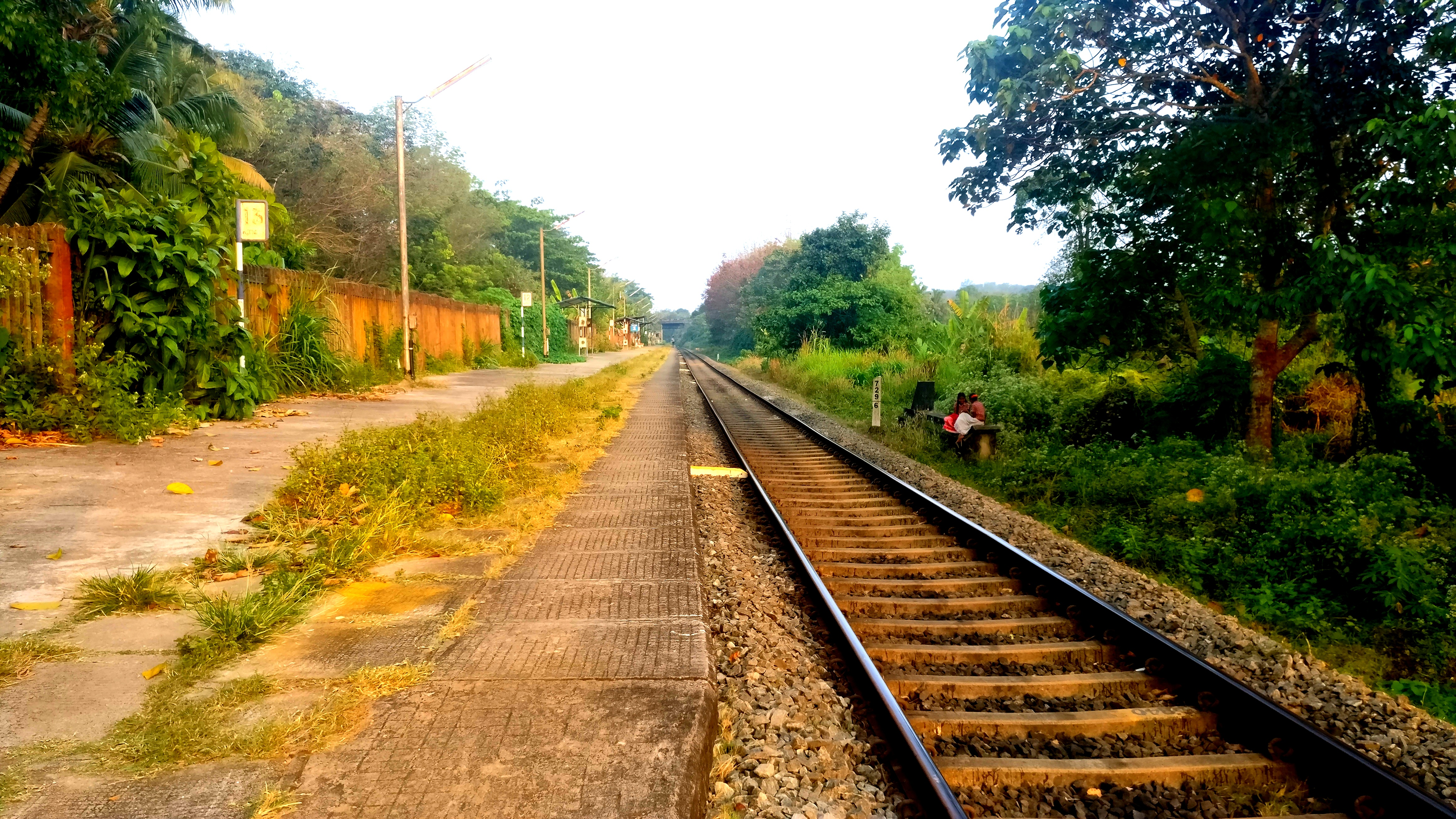
Railway line towards Sengottai at Kuri

Train Number	Source	Destination	Name/Type
56332	Kollam Junction	Punalur	Passenger
56331	Punalur	Kollam Junction	Passenger
56334	Kollam Junction	Punalur	Passenger
56700	Madurai	Punalur	Passenger
56333	Punalur	Kollam Junction	Passenger
56336	Kollam Junction	Punalur	Passenger
56365	Guruvayur	Punalur	Fast Passenger
56335	Punalur	Kollam Junction	Passenger
56701	Punalur	Madurai	Passenger
56366	Punalur	Guruvayur	Fast Passenger
56338	Kollam Junction	Punalur	Passenger
56337	Punalur	Kollam Junction	Passenger

== See also ==
- Kollam Junction railway station
- Paravur railway station
- Kottarakara railway station
- Punalur railway station
