= Poonkulanji =

- Village
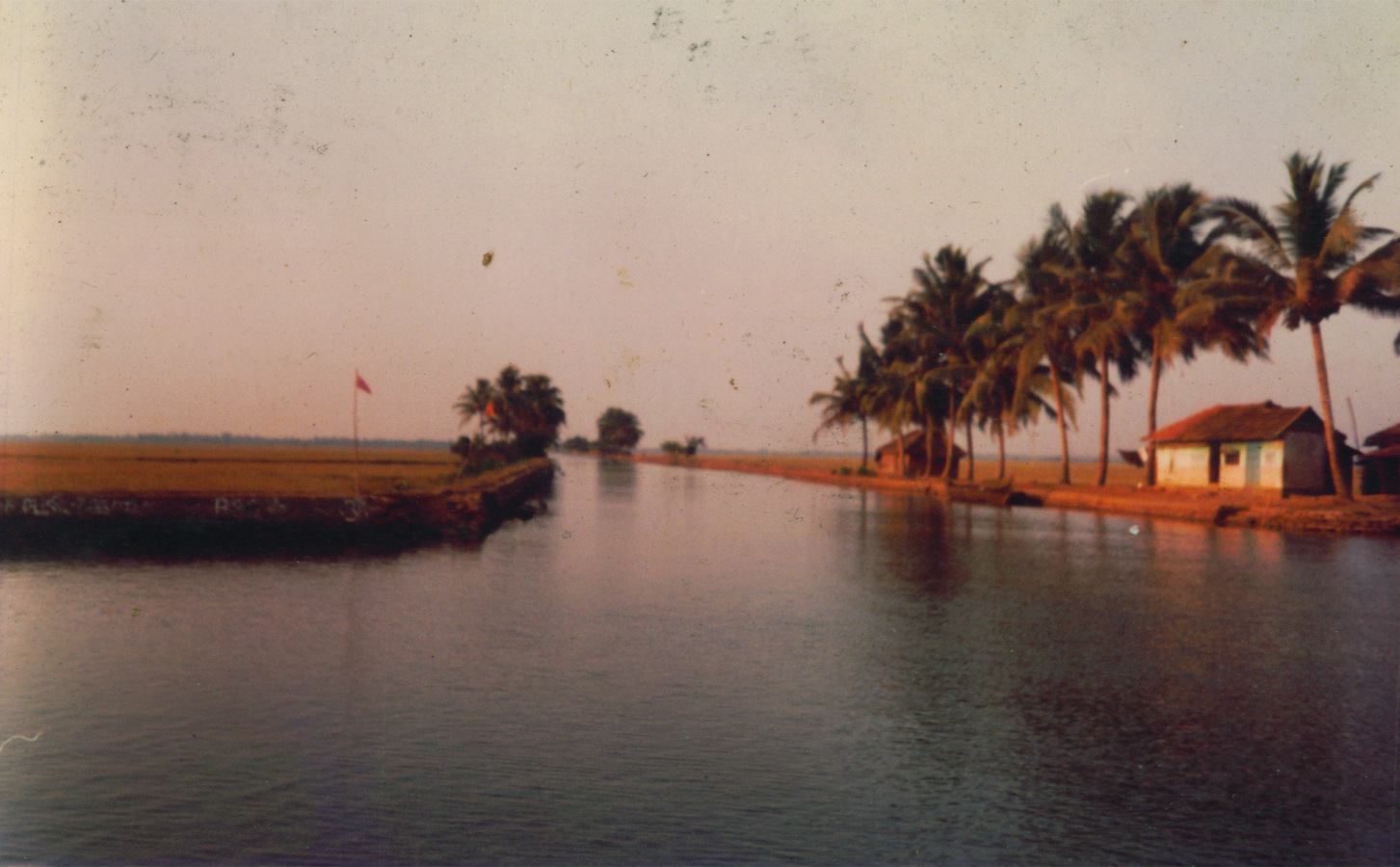
- View of Poonkulanji from the water

- Location in Kerala, India Poonkulanji (India)
- Coordinates: 9°6′2″N 76°54′22″E
- Country: India
- State: Kerala
- District: Kollam

Languages
  - Official: Malayalam, English
- Time zone: UTC+5:30 (IST)
- Vehicle registration: KL-25

Poonkulanji is a village in Kollam (Quilon) district of India's Kerala state.

== Institutions ==
The village has a primary school Govt UP SCHOOL Poonkulanji.

Poonkulanji Post Office

== Religions ==
The villagers follow Christian, Hindu and Muslim faiths. The village has four Churches, Mar Thoma Syrian Church St. Pauls Marthoma Church Poonkulanji, a Hindu Temple and mosque.

== Transportation ==
=== Roads ===
Transportation is mainly dependent on state run KSRTC buses. It is connected to Pathanapuram by frequent bus service that runs every hour.

== Nearest places ==
1. Pathanapuram -7.5;km
2. Kollam -48;km
3. Trivandrum -84;km
4. Adoor -23;km
5. Punalur -13;km
6. Pathanamthitta -30;km
7. Alappuzha -91;km
