= Vilakkuvettom =

- Village
- Location within Kerala
- Coordinates: 9.0927°N 76.8612°E
- Country: India
- State: Kerala
- District: Kollam
- Taluk: Punalur
- Named for: vilakkumaram

Government
  - Body: municipality

Population (2011)
  - Total: ?

Languages
  - Official: Malayalam
- Time zone: UTC+5:30 (IST)
- 691331PIN: 691305(Punalur), 691331(Valacode), 691332(Punalur PaperMills)
- Telephone code: 0475
- Vehicle registration: KL-02, KL-25, KL-77
- Nearest city: Pathanamthitta Adoor Kottarakara Punalur
- Lok Sabha constituency: Kollam
- Assembly constituency: Punalur
- Literacy: 93.63%

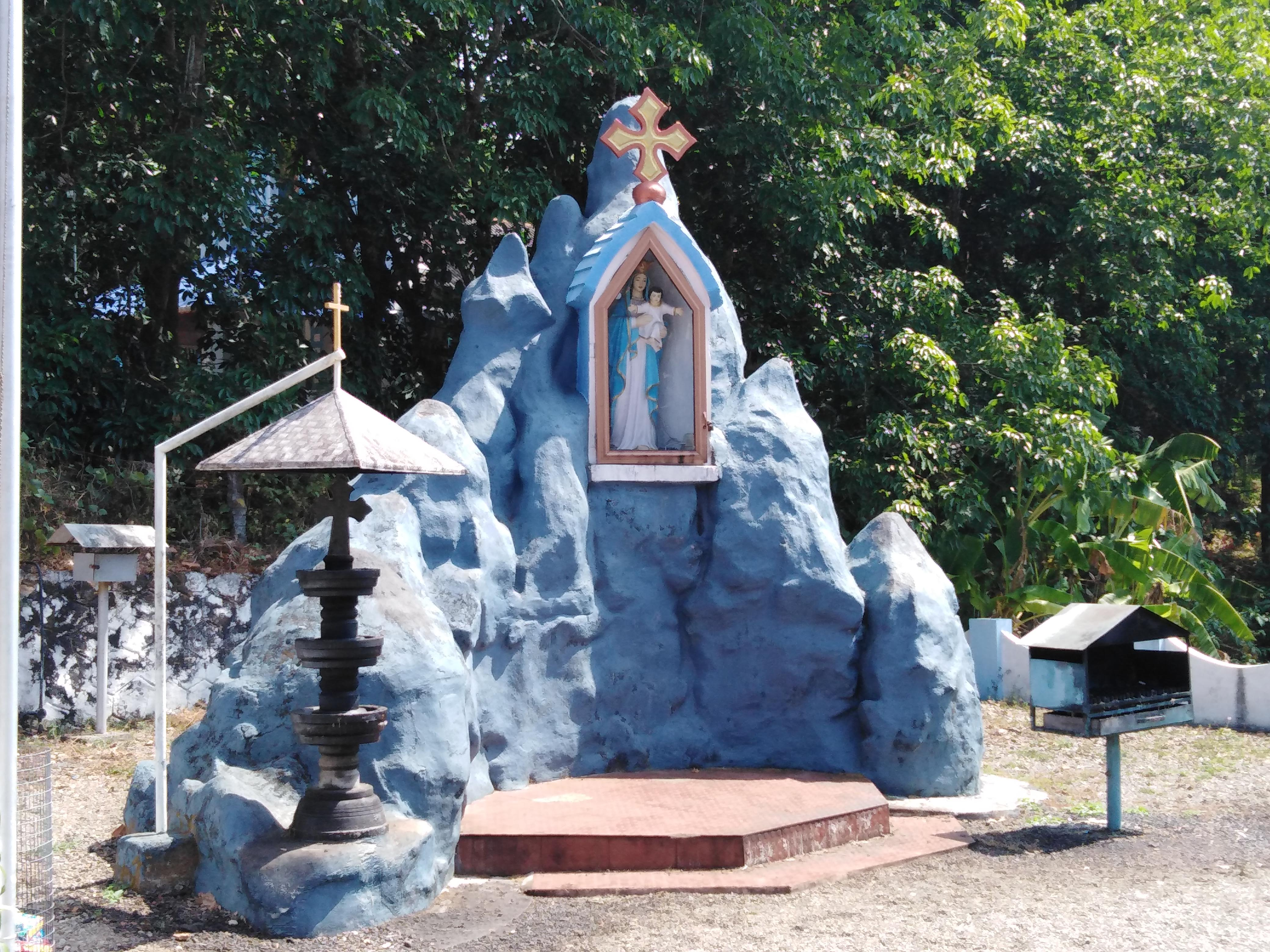
Grotto of St.Mary's Church, Vilakkuvettom

Vilakkuvettom is a village situated near Punalur in Kollam District, Kerala state, India. The Kallada River flows through it.

== Politics ==
Vilakkuvettom is a part of Punalur assembly constituency in Kollam (Lok Sabha constituency). INC, CPM, CPI, BJP etc. are the major political parties.

== Demographics ==
Malayalam is the native language of Vilakkuvettom.
