= Vilakkudy =

- village
- Location in Kerala, India Vilakkudy (India)
- Coordinates: 9°1′0″N 76°51′0″E
- Country: India
- State: Kerala
- District: Kollam

Government
  - Type: Panchayati raj (India)
  - Body: Gram panchayat

Population (2011)
  - Total: 32,995

Languages
  - Official: Malayalam, English
- Time zone: UTC+5:30 (IST)
- PIN: 691508
- Vehicle registration: KL-25
- Nearest town: Punalur (8 km)

Vilakkudy is a village in Kollam district in the state of Kerala, India. Vilakkudy is a part of Pathanapuram Block Panchayat and Kollam district Panchayat.

== Demographics ==
At the 2011 India census, Vilakkudy had a population of 32,995 with 15,504 males and 17,491 females.
