= Chenkilathu =

Village in Kollam district, Kerala, India

Coordinates: 9.0909°N 76.8405°E

Chenkilath is a small village in Pathanapuram, Pathanapuram Taluk, Kollam district, Kerala state, India. Most inhabitants are Christians. Founded by missionary John Burgess, Bethel AG Church is a local landmark.
