= Pattazhy =

- Village
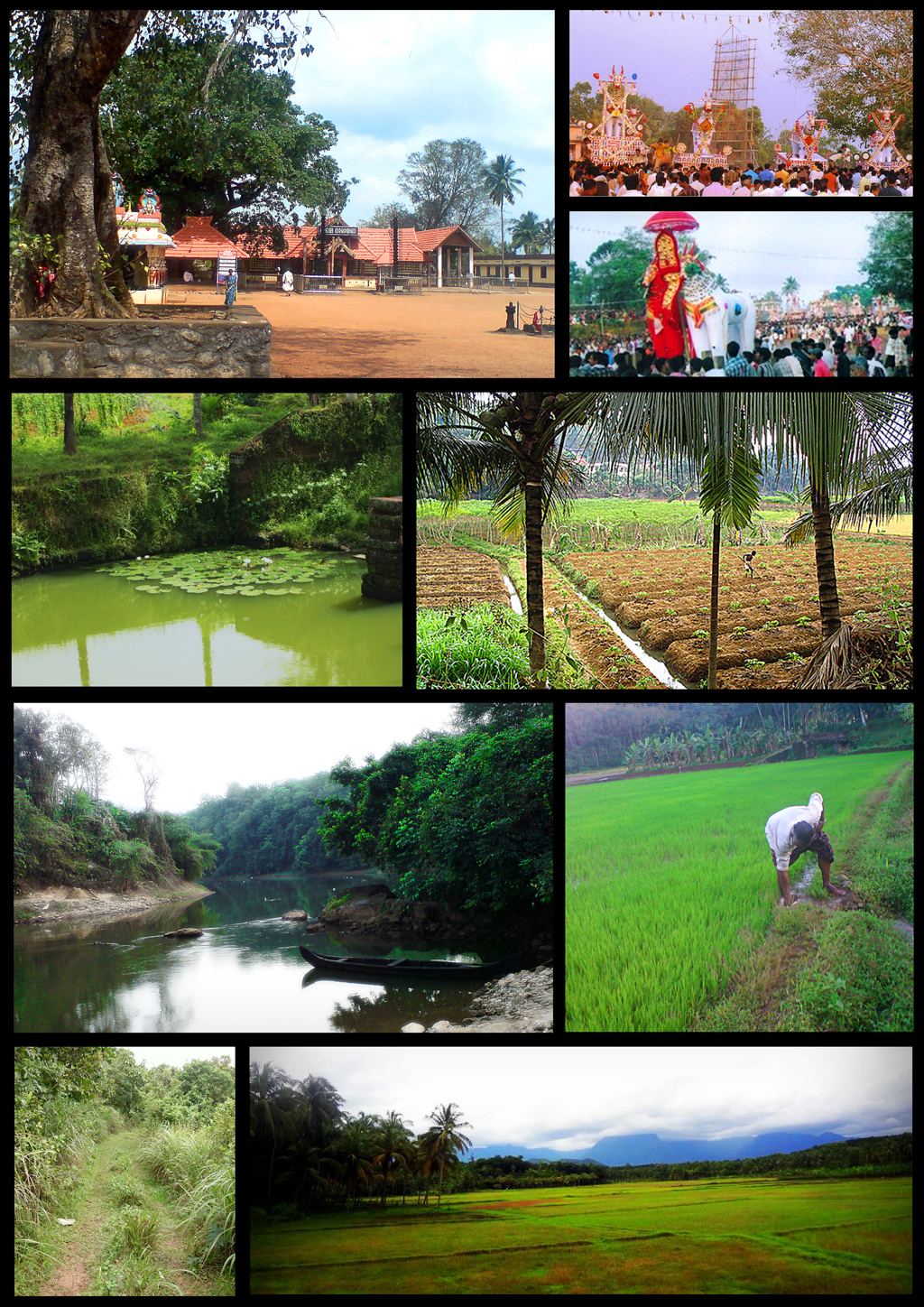
- Interactive map of Pattazhy
- Coordinates: 09°4′37.62″N 76°47′47.38″E
- Country: India
- State: Kerala
- District: Kollam
- Tehsil: Pathanapuram
- Village: Pattazhy
- Lok Sabha constituency: Mavelikara
- Assembly constituency: Pathanapuram

Government
  - Body: Pattazhy Grama Panchayat

Area
  - Total: 18.65 km^{2} (7.20 sq mi)

Population (2011)
  - Total: 17,718
  - Density: 950.0/km^{2} (2,461/sq mi)

Languages
  - Official: Malayalam; English
- Time zone: UTC+5:30 (IST)
- PIN: 691 522
- Telephone code: 00 91 (0)475
- Vehicle registration: KL-24, KL-25, KL80
- Nearest towns: Kottarakara; Pathanapuram; Punalur; Adoor
- Sex ratio: 1117 ♂/♀
- Literacy: 93.72%
- Precipitation: 1,700 millimetres (67 in)
- Avg. annual temperature: 27.2 °C (81.0 °F)
- Avg. summer temperature: 35 °C (95 °F)
- Avg. winter temperature: 24.4 °C (75.9 °F)

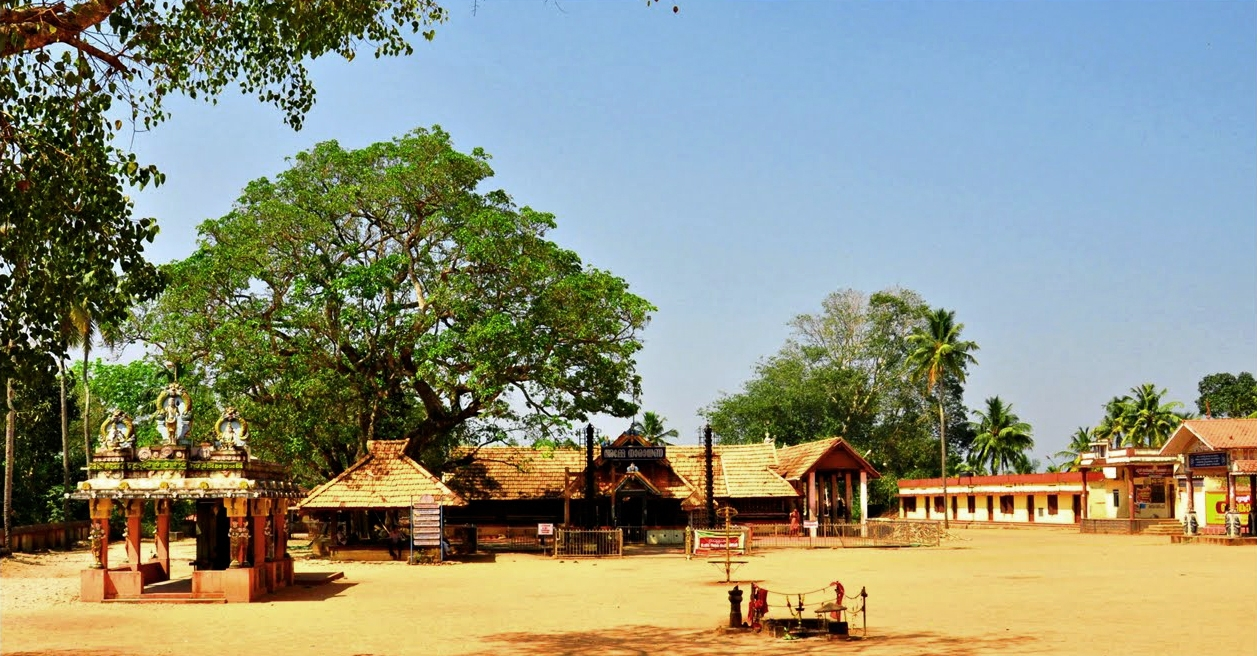
Pattazhy Devi Temple

Pattazhy, also Pattazhi is a village located in Pathanapuram taluk in the eastern part of the Kollam District, Kerala state, India. It is best known as the site of an ancient Bhagavathy temple, Pattazhy Devi Temple.

Pattazy is a part of Pathanapuram Block Panchayat and ruled by Pattazhy Grama Panchayat under Kollam district Panchayat. pattazhy the word derived from 𝘱𝘢𝘵𝘵𝘶 (പട്ട് ) which means traditional cloth used in temples and 𝘢𝘢𝘻𝘩𝘪(ആഴി ) which means sea

== Etymology ==
The name Pattazhy has an uncertain etymology. Pattazhy may stem from an imperfect Malayalam portmanteau fusing Patt ("Soft") and Aazhy ("Ocean"). Thus the word Pattazhy represents the compassion and affection of Pattazhy Devi to her beloved devotees and depth of her grace. The name Pattazhy may have also derived from the word Bhattarika which means a virtuous and pious woman.

== Culture ==
Pattazhy is a village situated in Pathanapuram Taluk of Kollam District in Kerala. The land of Pattazhy comprising two panchayat areas (Pattazhy and Pattazhy vadakekara) was given as a gift to Pattazhy Devi by the King of Travancore for the help and shelter given in the fierce fight against the king of Kayamkulam. When the king was extending his kingdom by winning war with the neighboring kingdoms with the help of Ramayyan Dalawa, Kambithan, a hardcore worshipper of Pattazhy Devi helped the king to take over Kayamkulam Kingdom. As a symbol of his gratitude the king ordered to let Pattazhy be named and dedicated to Devi by issuing a royal order. The annual festival at Pattazhy Devi Temple is one of the famous temple festivals in central Travancore. The Kumbhathiruvathira and Meenathiruvathira were the famous festivals of Pattazhy. The festival is known for Kambam (fire works), Aalpindi Vilakku Ezhunnallathu (Procession of small structure made out of plantain kernel and germinating leaves of coconut tree with numerous lamps on it), Ponnin Thirumudi (Devi's idol carved out of pure gold and rare precious stones) Ezhunnallathu.

Pattazhy also got a place in the Guinness Book of world records for the 'Longest bamboo'.

== Nearby towns ==
1. Kottarakkara - 10 kilometres (via Thamarakudy, Mylom)
2. Pathanapuram - 9 kilometres (Via Panthaplavu)
3. Adoor - 15 kilometres (Via Chelikkuzhy, Kaithaparambu, Ezhamkulam)
4. Enathu - 7 kilometres (Via Arattupuzha bridge)
5. Kunnicode - 10 kilometres (Via Pandithitta, Thalavoor)

== Transportation ==
- Bus Transportation: Nearest town Kottarakkara is well connected to all parts of Kerala. There are regular KSRTC bus services from Kottarakkara to Pattazhi every 15 minutes. The town is also well connected by KSRTC services to Pathanapuram. Private buses connect Pattazhi to Puthoor, Chavara etc.
- Railway stations: Nearest main broadgauge stations are available at Avaneeswaram (10 kilometers) Kollam (38 kilometres) and Chengannur (41 kilometres). However the nearest railway station is at Kuri H.S/Thalavoor (7 kilometres) connecting to Kollam
- Airports: Nearest airport is at Thiruvananthapuram (90 kilometres). Cochin International Airport is 175 kilometres away.

== See also ==
- Sainudeen Pattazhy
- 5178 Pattazhy
- Temples of Kerala
- Pathanapuram
- Kollam
