= Piravanthoor =

Coordinates: 9°03′N 76°55′E

Piravanthoor Piravanthur
- village
- Interactive map of Piravanthoor
- Country: India
- State: Kerala
- District: Kollam

Government
  - Type: Local
  - Body: Panchayat

Population (2011)
  - Total: 22,380

Languages
  - Official: Malayalam, English
- Time zone: UTC+5:30 (IST)
- Vehicle registration: KL-80

Piravanthoor (Piravanthur) is a village in Kollam district in the state of Kerala, India. Piravanthoor is a part of Pathanapuram Block Panchayat and Kollam district Panchayat.

== Demographics ==
As of 2011 India census, Piravanthoor had a population of 22380 with 10584 males and 11796 females.

== Schools in Piravanthoor ==
- Gdhs Piravanthoor School
- Punnala VHSS
- Valiyakavu HS
- Piravanthoor GD HS
- Chekom LPS
- Elikkattoor LPS
- Kamukumchery New LPS
- Karavoor LPS
- Vanmala LPS
- Chempanaruvi St. Paul's MSC LPS
- Piravanthoor UPS

== Offices and Places of Piravanthoor ==
- Piravanthoor Krishi Bhavan
- Piravanthoor Co-operative Bank
- The Pentecostal mission
- St.Mary Orthodox Church
