= Punalur Suspension Bridge =

Bridge in India

Punalur Suspension Bridge പുനലൂർ തൂക്കുപാലം
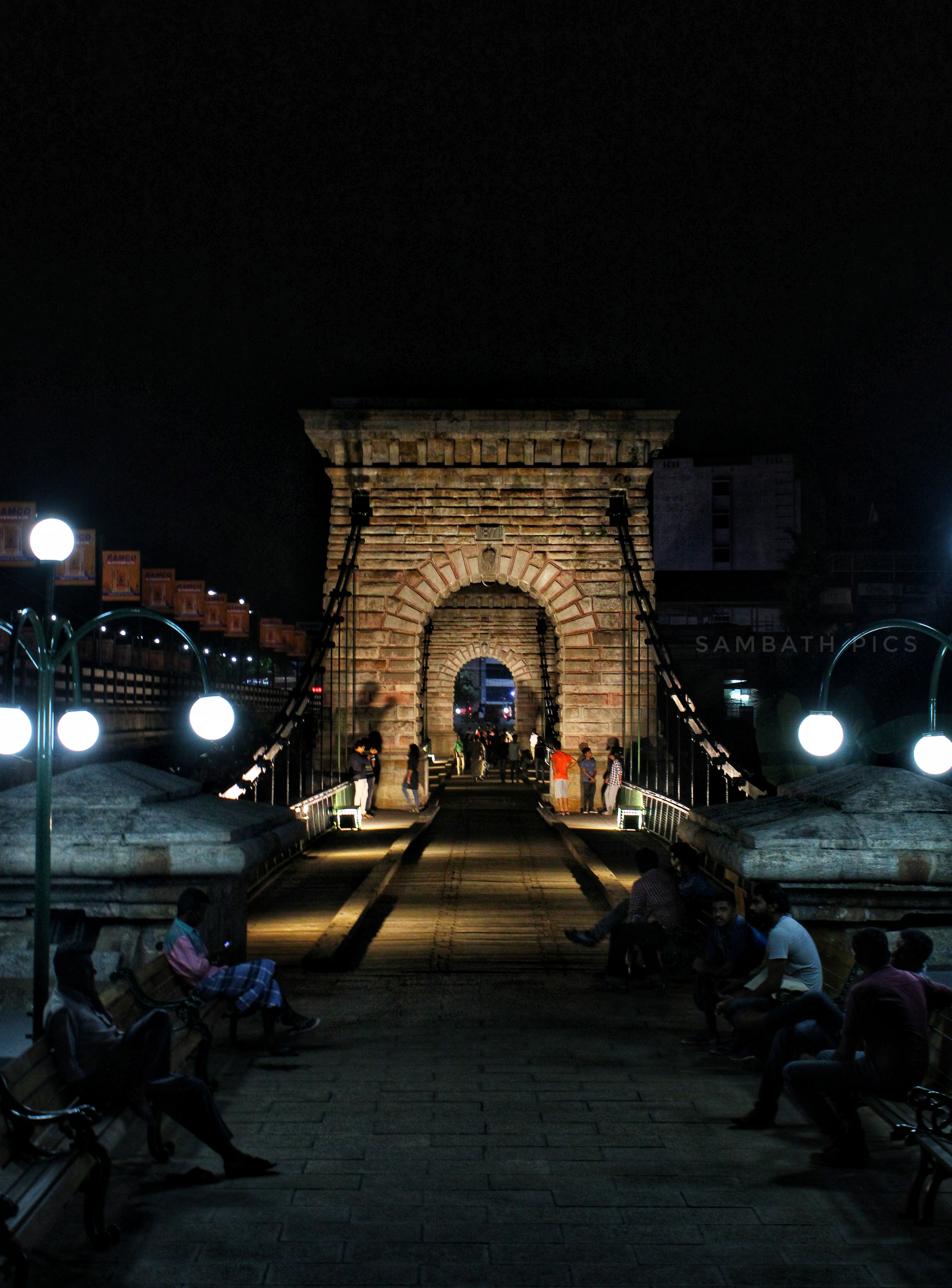
- Punalur Suspension Bridge
- Coordinates: 9.017°N 76.926°E
- Locale: Kollam District, Punalur, India

Characteristics
- Material: Stone, Wood, Steel etc.
- Total length: 400 feet (120 m)

History
- Architect: Albert Henry
- Opened: 1877
- Rebuilt: August–September 2013

The Punalur Suspension Bridge, located in Punalur, India is a 400-foot (120 m)-long 19th-century motorable bridge in Kerala, which was built by Travancore Government and is now a historical attraction. It was designed to shake when walked on, with the intention of deterring animals from crossing from the forest into the town.

== History and construction ==
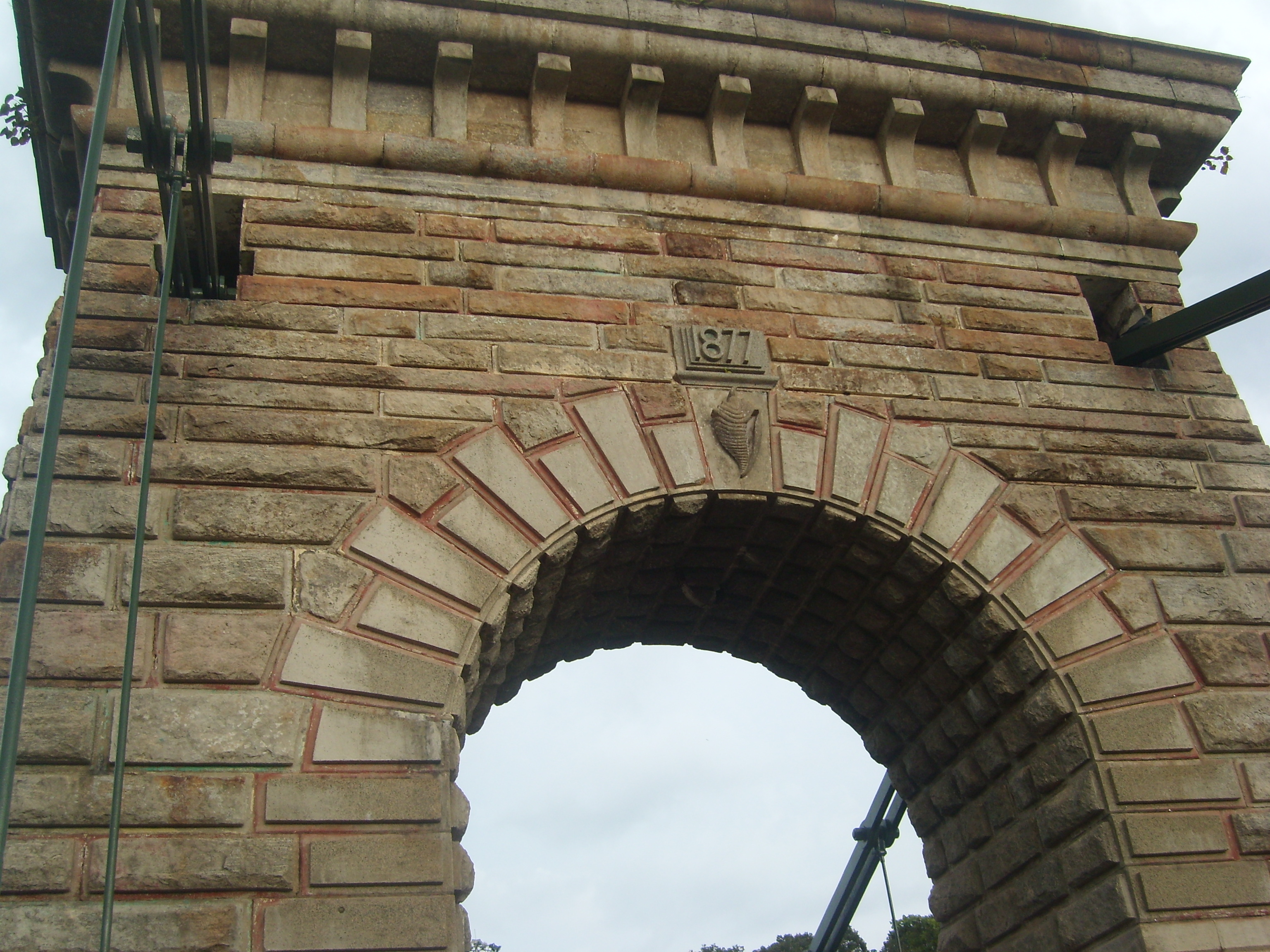
arch and column of the bridge with the emblem of Travancore

The Punalur Suspension Bridge is the first motorable bridge in South India. The suspension bridge crossing the river is the only suspended-deck type in south India. The construction started under Walthew Clarence Barton and completed in 1877 by Albert Henry chief engineers of Travancore across the Kallada River. This huge bridge was suspended by two spans and was used for vehicular movement. Construction took more than six years. It is said that after completion of the bridge people hesitated to walk over the bridge. In order to prove the strength of the bridge the engineer and his family passed under the bridge in a country boat while six elephants were walking over it. Now the bridge is of historical interest and is a major tourist attraction.

=== Reason for the bridge ===
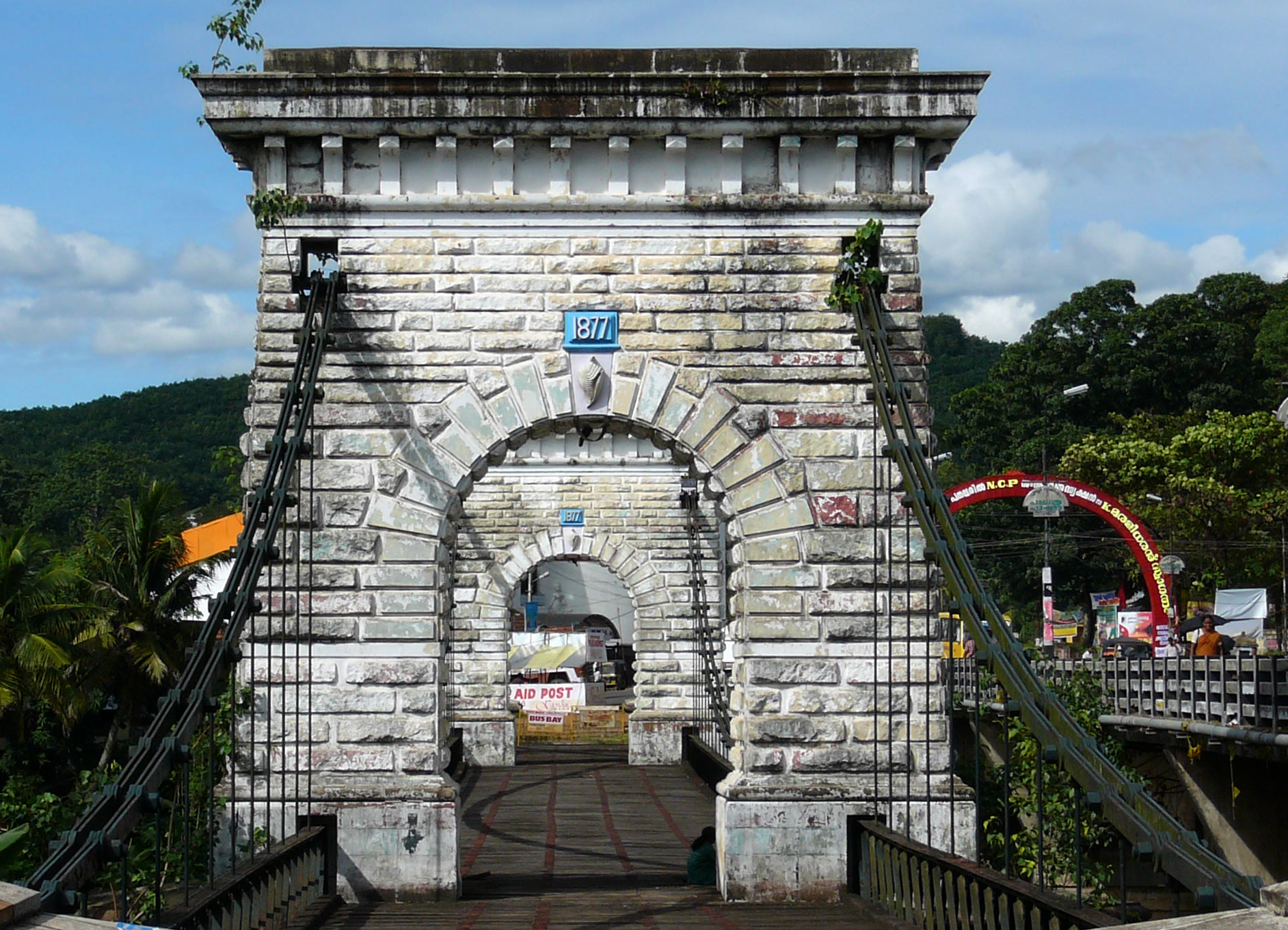
A view of the suspension bridge before renovation

A bridge from the dense forest over the river Kallada to the town was necessary, but it was necessary to prevent wild animals from using it to get to the populated side. The bridge was designed to shake when walked on to deter animals from crossing.

=== Method of construction ===
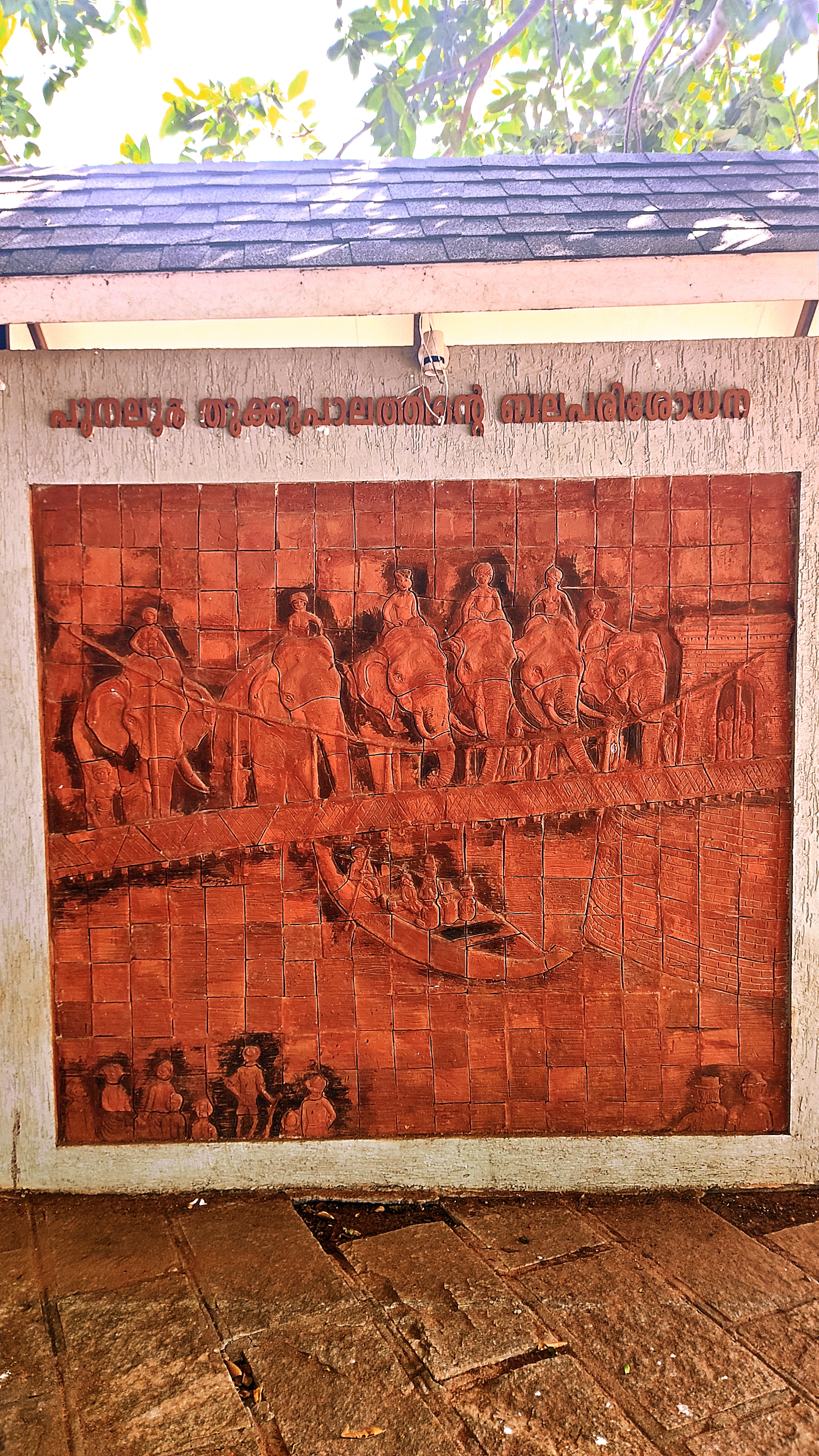
Weight testing of bridge, Relief in Ashramam, Kollam

The bridge is connected to four wells. The iron rods of the bridge is connected to the clips, situated in the wells. Each well is about 100 feet deep and no one since knows the engineering behind the construction of this bridge. It still remains a mystery.

== Replacement ==
A new, strong, concrete bridge was built near to the Punalur Suspension Bridge in 1972 due to heavy traffic on National Highway 208.

== Renovation ==
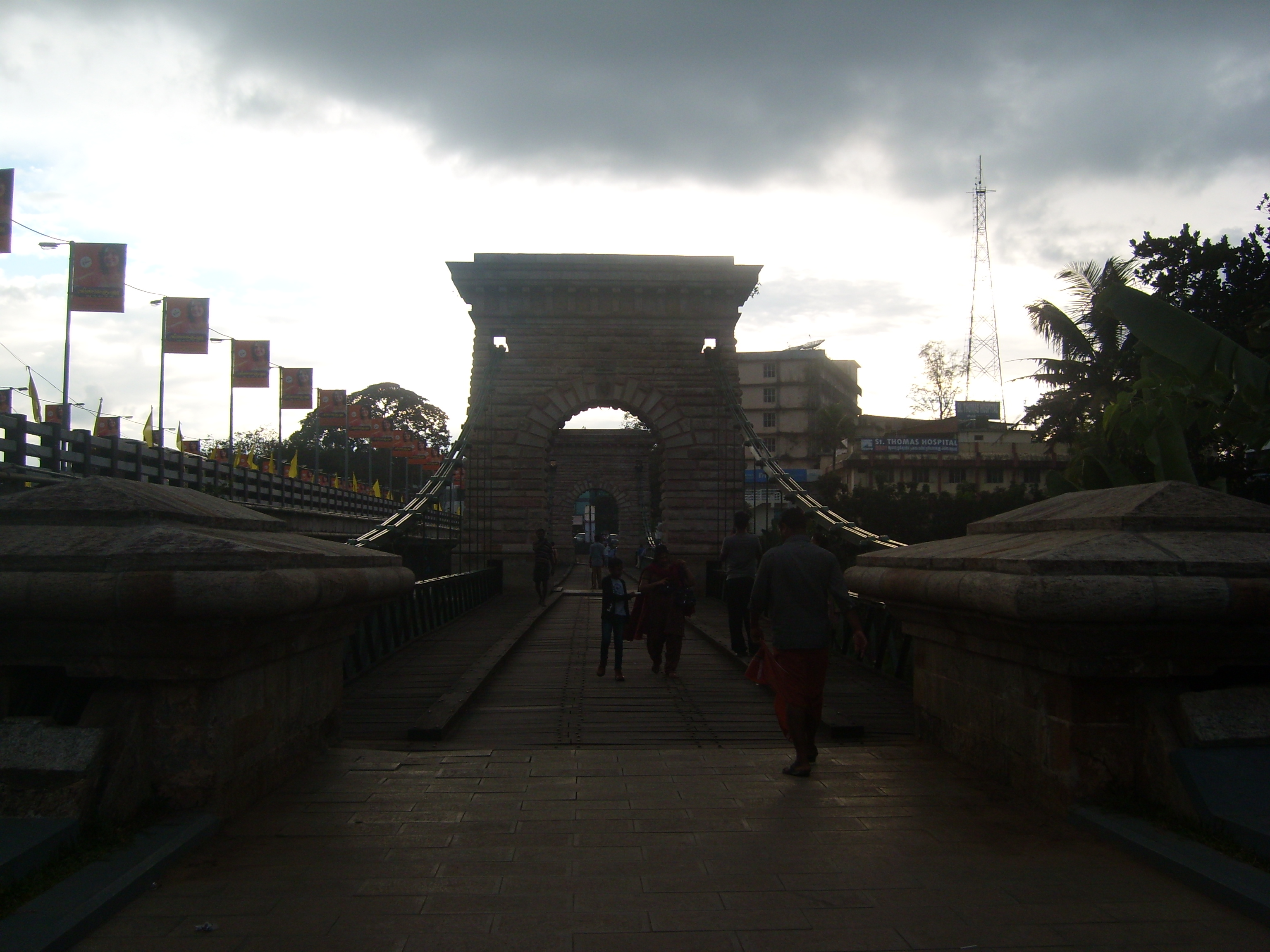
A full view of the renovated Punalur Suspension Bridge

The bridge was recently repaired and renovated by the government of Kerala. The structure was strengthened, new wood panels of the same tree (Kambakom) which was first used in the construction were fit, the steel armrests and the stone columns were painted, night lamps were installed and a new park and resting place were made near the bridge. The bridge reopened in 2018.
