= Randalummoodu =

- Village
- Location within Kerala
- Coordinates: 9.0927°N 76.8612°E
- Country: India
- State: Kerala
- District: Kollam
- Taluk: Pathanapuram

Languages
  - Official: Malayalam,
- Time zone: UTC+5:30 (IST)
- PIN: 689695
- Telephone code: 0475
- Vehicle registration: KL-02, KL-25, KL-77
- Nearest city: Pathanamthitta Adoor Kottarakara Punalur
- Lok Sabha constituency: Mavelikara
- Assembly constituency: Pathanapuram
- Literacy: 93.63%

Randalummoodu is a village situated near Kottarakkara in Kollam District, Kerala state, India.

== Politics ==
Randalummoodu is a part of Pathanapuram assembly constituency in Mavelikkara (Lok Sabha constituency). Shri. K. B. Ganesh Kumar is the current MLA of Pathanpuram. Shri.Kodikkunnil Suresh is the current member of parliament of Mavelikkara.

== Geography ==
Randalummoodu is a small village in Thalavoor panchayats. Randalummodu is junction in Pathanapuram-Kottarakkara (via Kura) road. It connects places Kura, etc. Randalummoodu junction is a main part of Randalummodu
