= Pathanapuram Block Panchayat =

- Block Panchayat
- (India) Flag
- Location of Pathanapuram Block Panchayat in Kerala, India Pathanapuram Block Panchayat (India)
- Coordinates: 9.0927°N 76.8612°E
- Country: India
- State: Kerala
- District: Kollam
- Taluk: Pathanapuram
- Block: Pathanapuram Block Panchayat

Government
  - Type: Block Panchayat
  - Body: Pathanapuram Block Panchayat

Languages
  - Official: Malayalam, English
- Time zone: UTC+5:30 (IST)
- Telephone code: +91-475
- Vehicle registration: KL-25
- Climate: Tropical monsoon (Köppen Am)

Pathanapuram Block Panchayat is a Block Panchayat in Kollam district, Kerala state, India. The headquarters of this block panchayat is situated in Pidavoor, Pathanapuram.

== Panchayats in the block ==
There are six Grama Panchayats in Pathanapuram Block Panchayat.

1. Vilakkudy
2. Thalavoor
3. Piravanthoor
4. Pathanapuram
5. Pattazhi
6. Pattazhi Vadakkekkara
