= Pidavoor =

- village
- Location in Kerala, India Pidavoor (India)
- Coordinates: 9°4′0″N 76°51′0″E
- Country: India
- State: Kerala
- District: Kollam

Population (2011)
  - Total: 9,843

Languages
  - Official: Malayalam, English
- Time zone: UTC+5:30 (IST)
- Vehicle registration: KL-
- Coastline: 0 kilometres (0 mi)
- Climate: Tropical monsoon (Köppen)
- Avg. summer temperature: 38 °C (100 °F)
- Avg. winter temperature: 18 °C (64 °F)
- Nearest places: Pathanapuram, Kottarakkara, Pazhanjikadavu

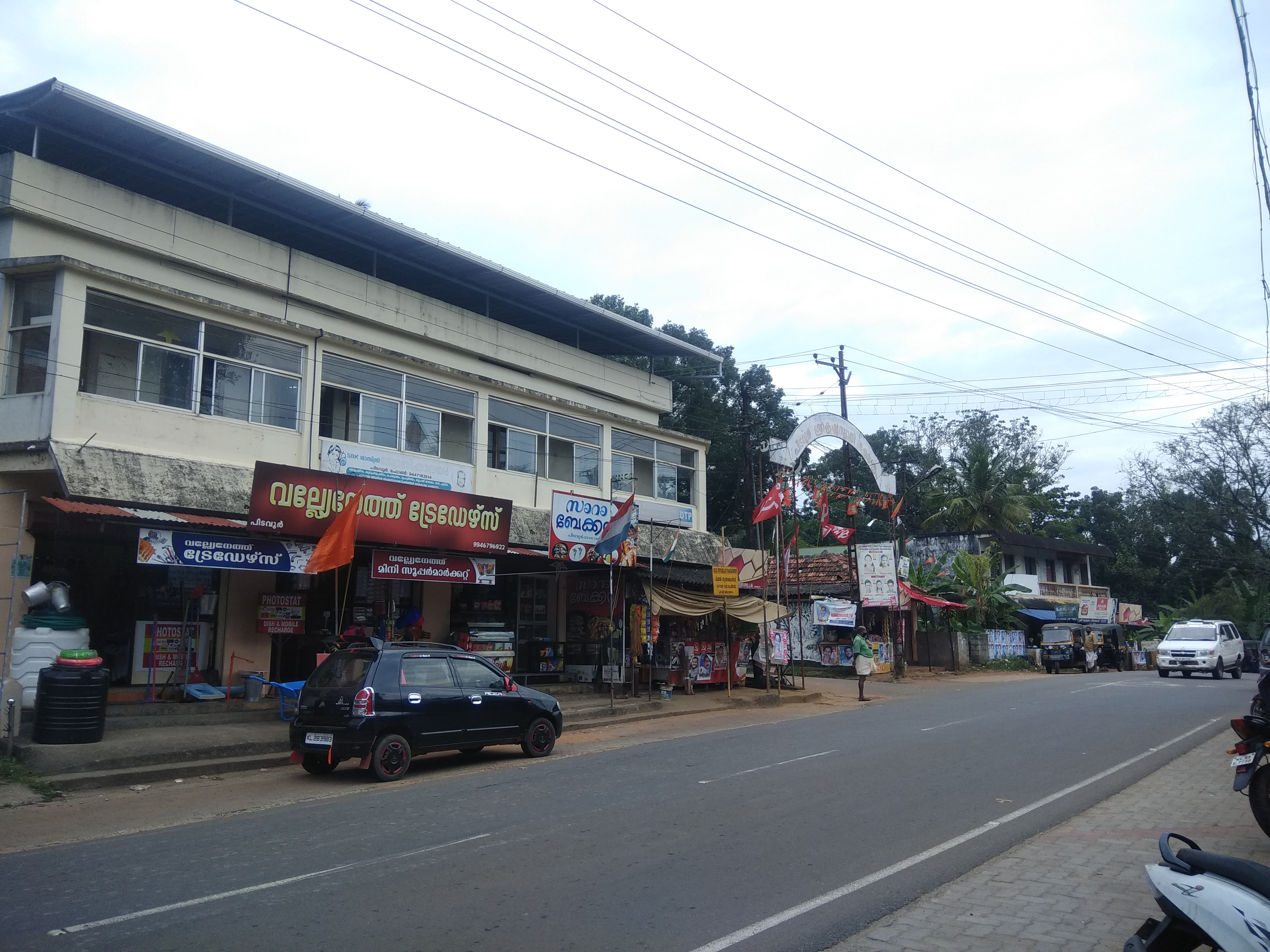
Pidavoor, Pathanapuram in 2020

Pidavoor is a village in Kollam district in the state of Kerala, India. Pidavoor situated near the Pathanapuram town. Pidavoor is a part of Thalavoor Grama Panchayat. It is the eighth ward of Thalavoor panchayat. It is the border of Thalavoor and Pathanapuram Panchayat. The river Kalladayar divides these two panchayats.

== Politics ==
Pidavoor is the part of Pathanapuram legislative assembly in Mavelikara (Lok Sabha constituency). Shri. Kodikkunnil Suresh is the present member of parliament. Shri.K. B. Ganesh Kumar is the current MLA of Pathanapuram.

== Demographics ==
As of 2011 India census, Pidavoor had a population of 9843 with 4687 males and 5156 females.
