= Mylom =

Mylom മൈലം
- village
- Location in Kerala, India Mylom (India)
- Coordinates: 9°0′20″N 76°45′45″E
- Country: India
- State: Kerala
- District: Kollam

Government
  - Type: Panchayati raj (India)
  - Body: Grama panchayat

Population (2011)
  - Total: 22,164

Languages
  - Official: Malayalam, English
- Time zone: UTC+5:30 (IST)
- Telephone code: 0474
- Vehicle registration: KL- 24
- Literacy: 100%%

Mylom is a village in Kollam district in the state of Kerala, India.

== Demographics ==
As of 2011 India census, Mylom had a population of 22164 with 10480 males and 11684 females.
