= Pathanapuram =

Pathanapuram Elephant Town
- Town and Taluk
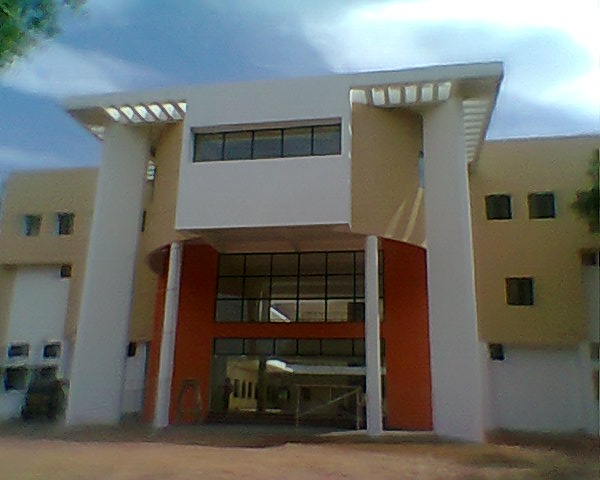
- Pathanapuram Engineering College

- Location within Kerala
- Coordinates: 9.0927°N 76.8612°E
- Country: India
- State: Kerala
- District: Kollam
- Taluk: Pathanapuram
- Named for: elephant town

Government
  - Type: Taluk
  - Body: Gram panchayath

Area
  - Total: 24.2 km^{2} (9.3 sq mi)

Population (2011)
  - Total: 32,339
  - Density: 1,340/km^{2} (3,460/sq mi)

Languages
  - Official: Malayalam, English
- Time zone: UTC+5:30 (IST)
- PIN: 689695
- Telephone code: 0475
- Vehicle registration: KL-80
- Nearest city: Pathanamthitta Punalur
- Lok Sabha constituency: Mavelikara
- Assembly constituency: Pathanapuram
- Literacy: 93.63%
- Website: kollam.nic.in/patha.html/

Pathanapuram is a Town in Pathanapuram Taluk Kollam district, Kerala, India. Pathanapuram is a part of Grama Panchayat and Block panchayat of same name and part of Kollam District Panchayat.

== History ==
The history of Pathanapuram goes back to Thenmala Desam, a small Principality under a local ruler. Its capital was at Pathanapuram. Later, Thenmala Desom became a part of Elayidathu Swaroopam having its capital at Kottarakkara. Pathanapuram was the capital of one of the two districts of Elayidathu Swaroopam. In 1764, King Marthanda Varma conquered Elayidathu Swaroopam and annexed it to Travancore. Most parts of Pathanapuram taluk were inhabited since before the Indus Valley civilization, and civilization may have existed in and around Pathanapuram beginning the 1st Century.

The city's name can be translated as Ten Elephant Town. The name Pathanapuram may have evolved from the fact that the area had a sizeable elephant population and elephants were caught and trained to work at the local elephant camp. The old police station area used to be the elephant camp.

For a long period, Pathanapuram was surrounded by extensive forests and was a relatively undeveloped rural region. In local tradition, this older Pathanapuram is remembered as “Kattu Pathanapuram” (കാട്ടു പത്തനാപുരം) — literally, “Forest Pathanapuram.”

A significant chapter in the transformation of the region is associated with Thoma Mar Dionysius Metropolitan. In 1929, he came to Pathanapuram and established Mount Tabor Dayara, beginning a new chapter in the spiritual, educational, and social development of the area.

According to the tradition associated with Mount Tabor and the local community, Thoma Mar Dionysius saw great potential in a place that was then surrounded by forests and had limited development. Through his vision and efforts, the area gradually became a centre of education, religious life, social service, and community development.

== Geography ==
Pathanapuram is spread over an area of 24.20 km^{2} (9.34 sq mi).

== Demographics ==
As of 2011 census of India, Pathanapuram Panchayat had a population of 32,339. The total population constitute, 15,129 males and 17,210 females —a sex ratio of 1138 females per 1000 males. 3,052 children are in the age group of 0–6 years, of which 1,536 are boys and 1,516 are girls —a ratio of 987 per 1000. The average literacy rate stands at 92.94% with 27,218 literates.

== Transport ==
The area is connected to the rest of the state by bus services of KSRTC and private buses. A KSRTC depot is also situated in Pathanapuram. Three state highways, namely Hill Highway, Main Eastern Highway and KP Road pass through the town. The Sabarimala bypass to Thiruvananthapuram starts at Pathanapuram and ends at Valakom.

The nearest railway stations to the town is Avaneeswaram other nearby stations are Chengannur, Kollam, Kayamkulam, Punalur.

Nearest airport is Trivandrum (80 km).

== Politics ==
Pathanapuram assembly constituency is a part of the Mavelikkara Loksabha Constituency. Kodikunnil Suresh is the present member of parliament who won the 2024 Indian general election. Current M.L.A of Pathanapuram is actor turned politician K. B. Ganesh Kumar. He has won from this constituency in the 2001, 2006, 2011 as UDF Candidate and in 2016 and 2021 Assembly election as LDFCandidate.

== Education ==
This is a list of educational institutions in Pathanapuram.

- St. Stephen's HSS, Pathanapuram
- Mount Tabor Girls HSS Pathanapuram
- Mount Tabor Training College Pathanapuram
- Indira Gandhi Memorial Vocational Higher Secondary School
- Govt.Nadukkunnu UPS
- Govt. Nedumparamp LPS pathanapuram
- MTLPS Pathanapuram
- Mother Susan EMLPS Pathanapuram
- Al-Ameen Public School Pathanapuram
- St.Mary's Residential School Pathanapuram
- St.Mary's Senior Secondary School Pathanapuram
- St.Stephen's College
- University Institute Of Technology Pathanapuram
- College of engineering Pathanapuram.
- NADUKKUNNU High school
- Mohammaden Govt. HSS Edathara Pathanapuram.
- GOVERNMENT MUSLIM LOWER PRIMARY SCHOOL KUNDAYA

== Technology ==
India's first rural information technology park to be wholly owned by a startup was established came up at Pathanapuram. The facility was founded under the banner of Corporate 360 a Singapore-registered company.

The park is specialised in Big data solutions, positioning Pathanapuram as a notable destination for technology-driven development in rural India.

As of 27 November 2025, Barun Chandran Balachandren was declared bankrupt by the Supreme Court of Singapore, as published in the Republic of Singapore Government Gazette (No. 5889, 5 December 2025). Corporate 360 Pte. Ltd., the Singapore-registered parent company, has since been closed.

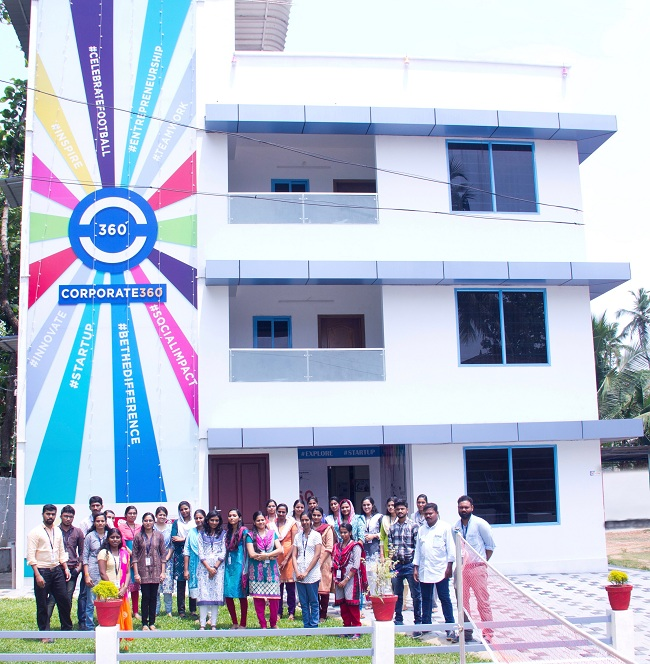
Corporate 360 office at Pathanapuram

== See also ==
- Chenkilathu
- Thinkalkarikkakom
