= Punalur =

- Municipality
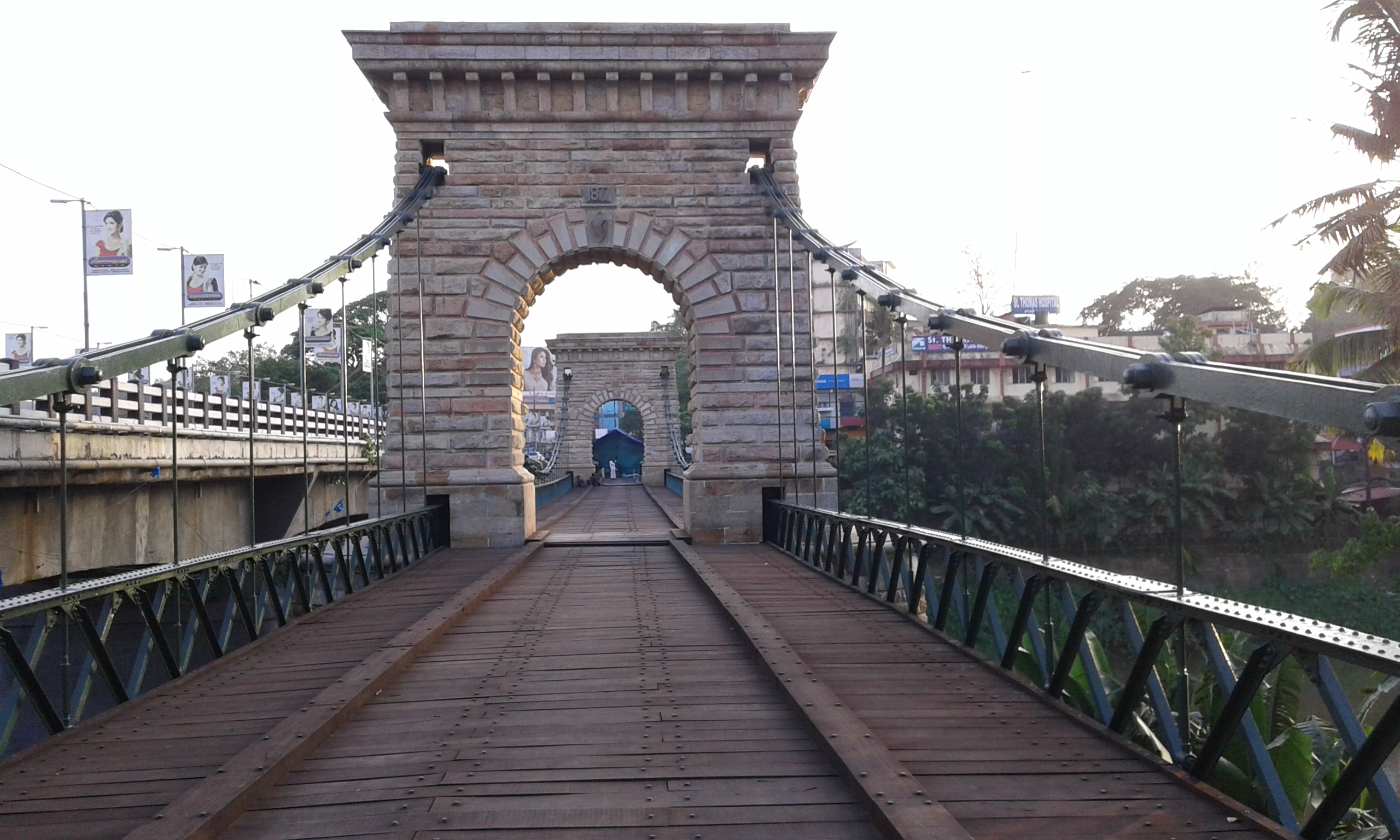
- Punalur Suspension Bridge

- Location in Kerala, India Punalur (India)
- Coordinates: 9.017°N 76.926°E
- Country: India
- State: Kerala
- District: Kollam

Government
  - Body: Municipality
  - Chairman/Chairperson: K. Pushpaletha

Area
  - Total: 34.35 km^{2} (13.26 sq mi)
- Elevation: 56 m (184 ft)

Population (2011)
  - Total: 46,702
  - Density: 1,360/km^{2} (3,521/sq mi)
- Time zone: UTC+5:30 (IST)
- PIN: 691305 to 034
- Telephone code: 0475
- Vehicle registration: KL 25
- Nearest city: Kollam (44 km)
- Website: www.punalurmunicipality.in www.voiceofpunalur.com

Punalur is a municipality in the Kollam district of Kerala, India. It is the headquarters of the Punalur Taluk and Punalur Revenue Division. It is in the eastern part of the Kollam district of Kerala, on the banks of the Kallada River and foothills of the Western Ghats. It is about 45 kilometres (28 mi) northeast of Kollam and 68 kilometres (42 mi) north of Thiruvananthapuram.

== Geography ==
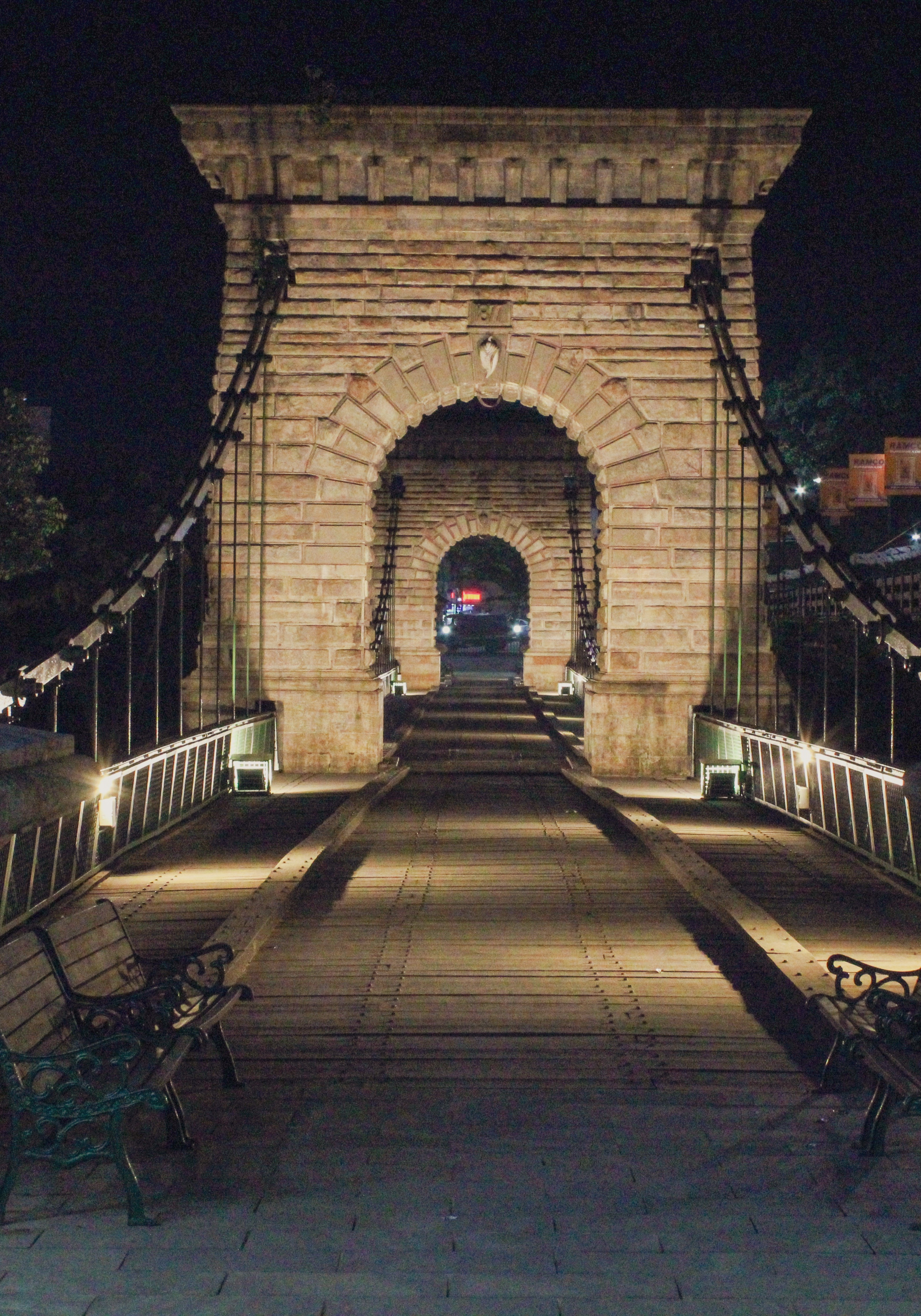
The Punalur Suspension Bridge

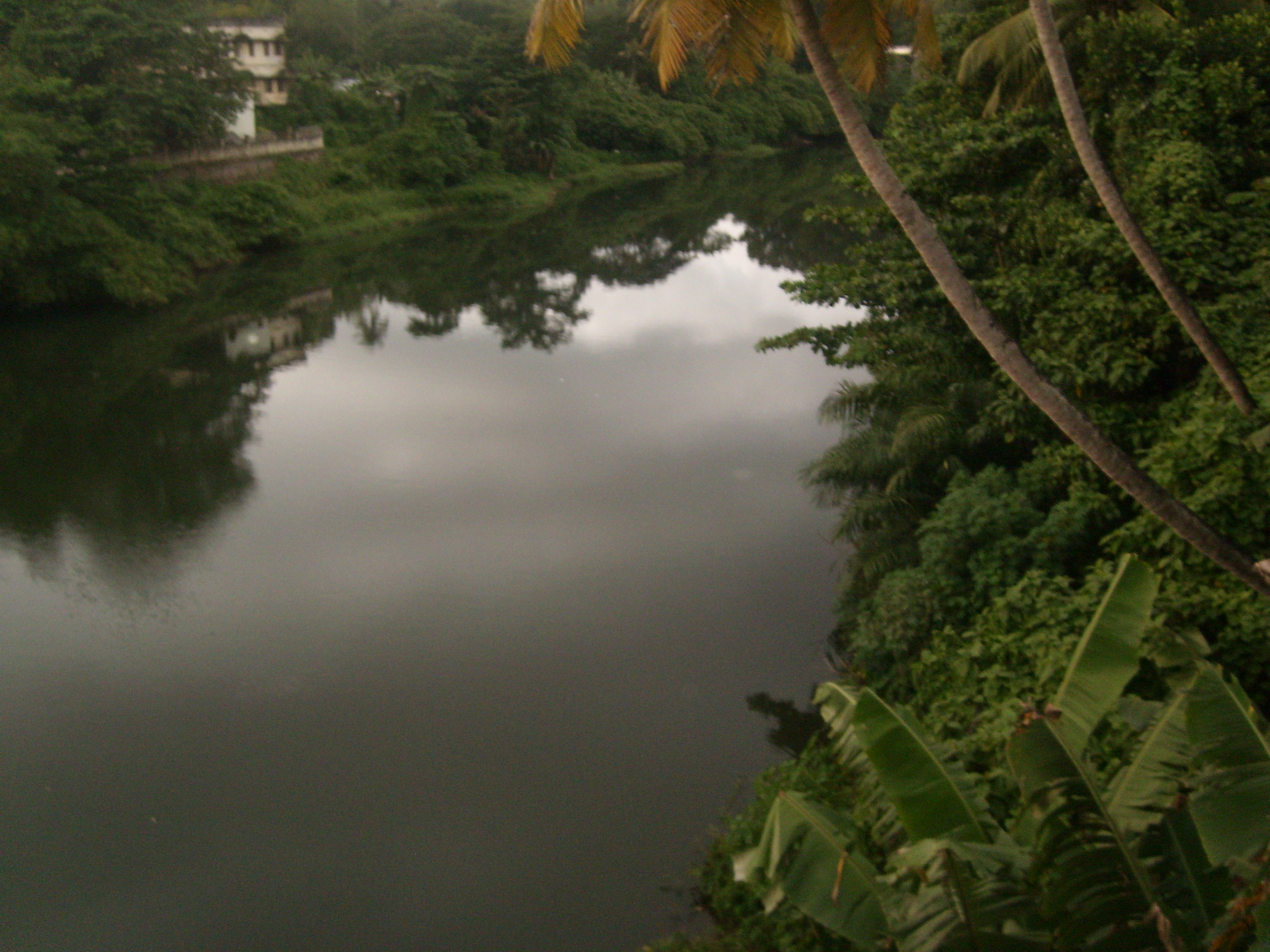
Punalur Kallada River seen from Punalur Suspension Bridge

Punalur has an average elevation of 56 metres (184 ft). Many tourists have visited scenic spots along the Kallada River. The Palaruvi Falls is 35 kilometres (22 mi) from Punalur. The first planned ecotourism project in Kerala is only 20 kilometres (12 mi) from Punalur on NH 744 towards Sengottai.

== Punalur Suspension Bridge ==
The Punalur Suspension Bridge (Malayalam: പുനലൂർ തൂക്കുപാലം) is a historic suspension bridge spanning the Kallada River in Punalur, Kollam district, Kerala, India. The bridge is approximately 400 feet (120 m) long and was constructed during the reign of Ayilyam Thirunal Rama Varma, the Maharaja of the erstwhile Kingdom of Travancore. It is one of the notable surviving examples of 19th-century suspension-bridge engineering in Kerala.

=== History ===
Construction of the bridge began in 1871 and was completed in 1877. The work was supervised by the Scottish engineer Albert Henry. The bridge was constructed by the Travancore government to provide a crossing over the Kallada River and improve communication between Punalur and the surrounding forested areas. At the time, the region was an important route for the movement of agricultural produce and other goods.

The bridge was also intended to reduce the movement of wild animals from the forested areas towards the populated side of the river. Its suspended deck produces movement when people walk across it, which was traditionally considered a deterrent to animals attempting to cross the structure.

=== Design and construction ===
The bridge is approximately 400 feet (120 m) long and 20 feet (6.1 m) wide. Its deck consists of wooden planks supported by iron members, while the sides incorporate metal components. The suspension system consists of large iron chains anchored to four masonry wells. According to the Kerala Department of Archaeology, each chain consists of 53 rings, with the anchoring system providing the balance necessary to support the suspended deck.

The bridge combines iron, timber and masonry construction. Kerala Tourism records that much of the material used in its construction was imported from England, while Kambam wood was used for the wooden deck.

=== Use and preservation ===
The bridge was originally used for the movement of people, goods and vehicles. With the growth of road traffic, a new concrete bridge was constructed nearby to accommodate heavier traffic. The historic suspension bridge subsequently ceased to serve as a major vehicular crossing and is now used by pedestrians.

The bridge was declared a protected monument by the Department of Archaeology, Government of Kerala, in 1990. Restoration and strengthening works were subsequently undertaken to preserve the historic structure. The renovated bridge was reopened to the public as a pedestrian attraction.

Today, the Punalur Suspension Bridge is a prominent historical landmark of Punalur and an example of the engineering practices employed in the region during the late 19th century. It is maintained as a heritage structure and is accessible to pedestrians.

== Punalur Paper Mills ==
Punalur Paper Mills was a historic paper manufacturing company located on the banks of the Kallada River at Punalur. It was among the early large-scale industrial enterprises in the region and played an important role in the industrial development of Punalur. The company was incorporated in 1888 by British industrialist I. H. Cameron and was originally known as the Travancore Paper Mills.

The mill was established in an area where bamboo, reeds and other forest resources were readily available. These materials were used as raw materials in paper production. The establishment of the mill, together with the development of the Kollam–Sengottai railway line and the construction of the Punalur Suspension Bridge, contributed to the emergence of Punalur as an industrial and commercial centre in eastern Kerala.

=== History ===
The enterprise underwent several changes in ownership and management during its early history. It was initially known as the Travancore Paper Mills and was subsequently known as the Lakshmi Paper Mills and the Meenakshi Paper Mills. In 1931, the company was reorganised as Punalur Paper Mills Limited.

The mill experienced financial difficulties during its early years and remained largely inactive for periods. It resumed production on a limited scale during the First World War, when shortages of paper increased demand. In 1937, the managing agency was taken over by A. & F. Harvey, after which an extensive programme of rehabilitation and modernisation was undertaken. New machinery and equipment were installed, resulting in a substantial increase in production.

In 1967, the company was taken over by industrialist L. N. Dalmia. The mill underwent further modernisation and its installed production capacity was substantially increased. It manufactured several varieties of paper, including paper used for packaging, postal and other industrial purposes. The India Security Press at Nashik was among its customers during an earlier period of operation.

=== Closure ===
The mill experienced financial and operational difficulties during the late 20th century. A major fire damaged one of its high-capacity paper machines in the late 1970s. Problems associated with raw-material supply, accumulated financial losses and disputes involving the company and its creditors further affected production.

The mill ceased operations on 30 August 1987, resulting in the loss of employment for more than a thousand workers. Its closure had a significant economic impact on Punalur and the surrounding region, where the mill had been an important source of industrial employment.

=== Revival ===
Following its closure, several attempts were made to revive the company. The Government of Kerala subsequently provided assistance and concessions as part of efforts to revive the closed industrial unit. After a prolonged period of inactivity, production at the Punalur Paper Mills resumed in September 2015 following the settlement of certain liabilities and worker-related dues.

The history of the mill is closely associated with the development of Punalur as an industrial town. The Kerala Government describes Punalur as an early centre of industrial activity, with the paper industry, timber-related industries and later plywood manufacturing contributing to the town's economic development.

== Politics ==
Punalur Assembly constituency is part of the Kollam (Lok Sabha constituency) and Punalur Assembly constituency.

K. Pushpaletha is the sitting Chairperson of Punalur Municipality. P. S. Supal of Communist Party of India is the MLA of Punalur assembly constituency and N. K. Premachandran is MP of Kollam (Lok Sabha constituency).

The assembly constituency is continuously won by Communist Party of India since 1991. Punalur Municipality is currently ruled by Left Democratic Front.

== Climate ==
Climate data for Punalur (1991–2020, extremes 1956–2012)
Month	Jan	Feb	Mar	Apr	May	Jun	Jul	Aug	Sep	Oct	Nov	Dec	Year
Record high °C (°F)	38.8 (101.8)	40.1 (104.2)	40.6 (105.1)	40.6 (105.1)	39.2 (102.6)	36.6 (97.9)	36.6 (97.9)	34.8 (94.6)	35.2 (95.4)	36.2 (97.2)	37.6 (99.7)	36.2 (97.2)	40.6 (105.1)
Mean daily maximum °C (°F)	34.1 (93.4)	35.5 (95.9)	36.3 (97.3)	35.4 (95.7)	34.1 (93.4)	31.6 (88.9)	30.9 (87.6)	31.2 (88.2)	32.0 (89.6)	32.1 (89.8)	32.4 (90.3)	32.8 (91.0)	33.2 (91.8)
Mean daily minimum °C (°F)	20.6 (69.1)	21.3 (70.3)	22.5 (72.5)	23.4 (74.1)	23.5 (74.3)	22.9 (73.2)	22.6 (72.7)	22.6 (72.7)	22.6 (72.7)	22.6 (72.7)	22.2 (72.0)	21.3 (70.3)	22.3 (72.1)
Record low °C (°F)	12.9 (55.2)	14.9 (58.8)	17.4 (63.3)	18.1 (64.6)	19.2 (66.6)	18.9 (66.0)	18.4 (65.1)	18.6 (65.5)	17.4 (63.3)	16.9 (62.4)	15.3 (59.5)	15.0 (59.0)	12.9 (55.2)
Average rainfall mm (inches)	14.5 (0.57)	49.1 (1.93)	89.0 (3.50)	216.7 (8.53)	256.7 (10.11)	458.8 (18.06)	391.6 (15.42)	309.9 (12.20)	254.1 (10.00)	432.9 (17.04)	245.1 (9.65)	47.3 (1.86)	2,765.6 (108.88)
Average rainy days	1.1	2.5	5.4	11.6	11.9	19.9	20.2	16.0	12.6	16.4	10.5	2.6	130.6
Average relative humidity (%) (at 17:30 IST)	53	52	56	65	67	75	76	74	72	75	73	64	67
Source: India Meteorological Department

== Demographics ==
As of 2011 India census, Punalur had a population of 46,702. Males constitute 49% of the population and females 51%. Punalur has an average literacy rate of 84%, higher than the national average of 59.5%: male literacy is 85%, and female literacy is 82%. In Punalur, 10% of the population is under 6 years of age.

== Punalur taluk ==
Punalur taluk, of which Punalur is the centre, consists of 15 revenue villages as listed below:

- Alayaman
- Anchal
- Arakkal
- Ariyankavu
- Ayiranelloor
- Channapetta
- Edamon
- Edamulakkal
- Eroor
- Karavaloor
- Kulathupuzha
- Punalur
- Thenmala
- Thinkalkarikkom
- Valakkode

== Notable people ==
- Punalur Balan (1927–1987), Malayalam writer and a poet
- Lalithambika Antharjanam (1909–1987), writer and social reformer
- M. J. Radhakrishnan, cinematographer
