= Kunnathur, Kerala Assembly constituency =

Constituency of the Kerala legislative assembly in India

Kunnathur
- Constituency No. 118 for the Kerala Legislative Assembly
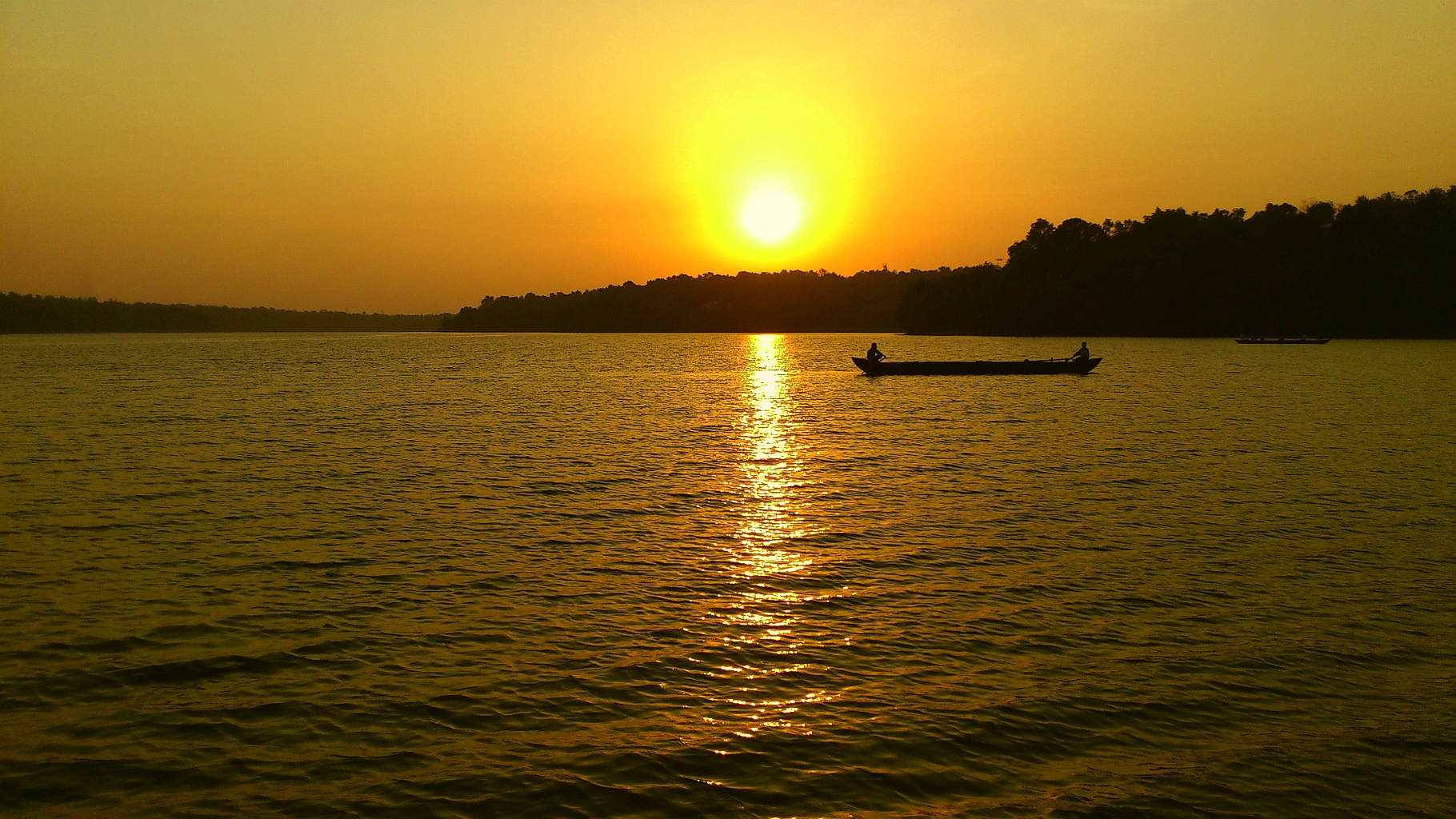
- Sasthamcotta Lake in Kunnathur Assembly constituency

Constituency details
- Country: India
- Region: South India
- State: Kerala
- District: Kollam
- Established: 1957
- Total electors: 2,02,165 (2021)
- Reservation: SC

Member of Legislative Assembly
- 16th Kerala Legislative Assembly
- Incumbent Ullas Kovur
- Party: RSP
- Alliance: UDF
- Elected year: 2026

Kunnathur is the only legislative assembly constituency reserved for the Scheduled Castes in Kollam district of Kerala, India. It is one of the 11 assembly constituencies in the district.. This constituency included in Mavelikara Lok Sabha constituency. As of the 2026 Assembly elections, the current MLA is Ulllas Kovoor of RSP.

== Local self-governed segments ==
Kunnathur Assembly constituency is composed of the following local self-governed segments:

Sl no.	Name	Status (Grama panchayat/Municipality)	Taluk
1	Sooranad North	Grama Panchayath	Kunnathur
2	Sooranad South	Grama panchayat	Kunnathur
3	Poruvazhy	Grama panchayat	Kunnathur
4	Sasthamcotta	Grama panchayat	Kunnathur
5	Mynagappally	Grama panchayat	Kunnathur
6	Kunnathur	Grama panchayat	Kunnathur
7	West Kallada	Grama panchayat	Kunnathur
8	East Kallada	Grama panchayat	Kollam
9	Munroethuruth	Grama panchayat	Kollam
10	Pavithreswaram	Grama panchayat	Kottarakkara

== Electoral history ==
Kunnathur Assembly constituency was a two-member constituency until 1965. It officially became an constituency reserved for the Scheduled Castes in the 1967 Kerala State Assembly election.

=== Travancore-Cochin Legislative Assembly Elections ===
Election	Name	Party	Vote Margin
1951	Aadichan	Indian National Congress	5,316
1951	Madhavan Unnithan	Indian National Congress	6,247
1954	P. R. Madhavan Pillai	Communist Party of India	5,778
1954	K. S. Krishna Sastri	Revolutionary Socialist Party	5,566

== Members of the Legislative Assembly ==
The following list contains all members of Kerala Legislative Assembly who have represented the constituency:

Election	Name	Party
1957	P. R. Madhavan Pillai	Communist Party of India
1957	R. Govindan	Communist Party of India
1960	G. Chandrasekhara Pillai	Indian National Congress
1960	P. C. Adichan	Communist Party of India
1967	K. C. S. Sastri	Indian National Congress
1970	Sathyapalan	Revolutionary Socialist Party
1977	Kallada Narayanan	Revolutionary Socialist Party
1980	Kallada Narayanan	Revolutionary Socialist Party
1982	M. Kottarakuzhi Sukumaran	Indian National Congress
1987	T. Nanoo Master	Revolutionary Socialist Party
1991	T. Nanoo Master	Revolutionary Socialist Party
1996	T. Nanoo Master	Revolutionary Socialist Party
2001	Kovoor Kunjumon	Revolutionary Socialist Party
2006	Kovoor Kunjumon	Revolutionary Socialist Party
2011	Kovoor Kunjumon	Revolutionary Socialist Party
2016	Kovoor Kunjumon	Revolutionary Socialist Party (Leninist)
2021	Kovoor Kunjumon	Revolutionary Socialist Party (Leninist)
2026	Ullas Kovur	Revolutionary Socialist Party

== Election results ==
Percentage change (±%) denotes the change in the number of votes from the immediate previous election.

=== 2026 ===
2026 Kerala Legislative Assembly election: Kunnathur
Party	Candidate	Votes	%	±%
RSP	Ullas Kovur	81,488	49.66	8.26▲
RSP(L)	Kovoor Kunjumon	56,174	34.23	8.9 ▼
BJP	Raji Prasad	24,841	15.14	1.62▲
NOTA	None of the above	828	0.5	
Independent	Manthara Velayudhan	404	0.25	▼0.15
Margin of victory		25,314	15.43	▲13.69
Turnout		1,64,101		
RSP gain from RSP(L)		Swing		

=== 2021 ===
There were 2,02,165 registered voters in the constituency for the 2021 Kerala Assembly election.

2021 Kerala Legislative Assembly election: Kunnathur
Party	Candidate	Votes	%	±%
RSP(L)	Kovoor Kunjumon	69,436	43.13	▼4.26
RSP	Ullas Kovur	66,646	41.40	▲6.86
BJP	Raji Prasad	21,760	13.52	
BSP	R.S. Anju	946	0.6	
Independent	Manthara Velayudhan	623	0.4	
ADHRMPI	R. Sukumaran	326	0.2	
Independent	Arunkumar S Uliyacovil	325	0.2	
Margin of victory		2,790	1.74	▼11.14
Turnout		1,60,062	78.1	▲1.44
RSP(L) hold		Swing		

=== 2016 ===
There were 2,08,502 registered voters in the constituency for the 2016 Kerala Assembly election.

2016 Kerala Legislative Assembly election: Kunnathur
Party	Candidate	Votes	%	±%
RSP(L)	Kovoor Kunjumon	75,725	47.39	▼2.61
RSP	Ullas Kovur	55,196	34.54	▼7.06
BDJS	Thazhava Sahadevan	21,742	13.61	
SDPI	Thulaseedharan Pallickal	1,698	1.06	▼0.54
Independent	Kunjumon	1,516	0.95	−
PDP	C. K. Gopi	1,422	0.89	
NOTA	None of the above	1,051	0.66	
BSP	V. Remadevi	740	0.46	▼0.34
Independent	Manilal M. R.	718	0.45	
Margin of victory		20,529	12.84	▲4.44
Turnout		1,59,830	76.66	▲2.66
RSP(L) gain from RSP		Swing		

=== 2011 ===
There were 1,94,417 registered voters in the constituency for the 2011 election.

2011 Kerala Legislative Assembly election: Kunnathur
Party	Candidate	Votes	%	±%
RSP	Kovoor Kunjumon	71,923	50.0	▼6.6
INC	P. K. Ravi	59,835	41.6	▲4.6
BJP	Raji Prasad	5,949	4.1	−
SDPI	Thulaseedharan Pallickal	2,310	1.6	
Independent	Vallikunnam Prasad	1,354	0.9	−
BSP	Pulikuzhy Balachandran	1,145	0.8	▼1.6
Independent	Shylaja P.	611	0.4	
Independent	Ravi	525	0.4	
Independent	V. Remadevi	266	0.2	
Margin of victory		12,088	8.4	▼11.3
Turnout		1,43,918	74.0	▲3.1
RSP hold		Swing		

=== 2006 ===
There were 1,62,149 registered voters in the constituency for the 2006 election.

2006 Kerala Legislative Assembly election: Kunnathur
Party	Candidate	Votes	%	±%
RSP	Kovoor Kunjumon	65,011	56.6	▲7.0
INC	P Ramabhadran	42,438	37	▼9.8
BJP	Adv. M. Saraswathy	4,652	4.1	▲0.4
BSP	P T Prasannakumar	2,728	2.4	
Margin of victory		22,573	19.7	▲16.9
Turnout		1,14,875	70.9%	▼3.4
RSP hold		Swing		

=== 2001 ===
There were 1,65,183 registered voters in the constituency for the 2001 election.

2001 Kerala Legislative Assembly election: Kunnathur
Party	Candidate	Votes	%	±%
RSP	Kovoor Kunjumon	60,827	49.6	▲3.0
INC	Pandalam Sudhakaran	57,341	46.8	▲4.5
BJP	P T Bhaskaran	4,489	3.7	−
Margin of victory		3,486	2.8	▼1.4
Turnout		1,22,662	74.3%	▲1.4
RSP hold		Swing		

=== 1996 ===
There were 1,55,586 registered voters in the constituency for the 1996 election.

1996 Kerala Legislative Assembly election: Kunnathur
Party	Candidate	Votes	%	±%
RSP	T Nanoo Master	51,697	46.6	▼2.5
INC	Visalakshy	46,934	42.3	▼4.5
PDP	T A Velayudhan	7,231	6.5	
BJP	K Sadhanandan	4,098	3.7	▲0.2
Independent	Sasikumar	525	0.5	
Independent	Janardhanan	228	0.2	
Samajwadi Jan Parishad	G Balakrishnan	167	0.2	
Margin of victory		4,763	4.2	▲1.9
Turnout		1,13,483	72.9%	▼4.3
RSP hold		Swing		

=== 1991 ===
There were 1,49,077 registered voters in the constituency for the 1991 election.

1991 Kerala Legislative Assembly election: Kunnathur
Party	Candidate	Votes	%	±%
RSP	T Nanoo Master	56,064	49.1	▼3.2
INC	V Sasidharan	53,462	46.8	▲5.7
BJP	S Raghunath	4,006	3.5	▼1.0
Independent	V Janardhanan	694	0.6	
Margin of victory		2,602	2.3	▼8.3
Turnout		1,15,018	77.2%	▼6.4
RSP hold		Swing		

=== 1987 ===
There were 1,20,608 registered voters in the constituency for the 1987 election.

1987 Kerala Legislative Assembly election: Kunnathur
Party	Candidate	Votes	%	±%
RSP	T. Nanu Master	52,447	52.3	▲5.11
INC	K K Blakrishnan	41,794	41.67	−
BJP	Raghunath s kallada	4,475	3.5	−
Independent	Kodiyayyutharavil T Palpu	1,092	1.09	
Independent	K Balakrishnan	402	0.4	
Independent	A K Damodaran	76	0.08	
Margin of victory		10,653	10.62	▲6.25
Turnout		1,00,811	83.59%	▲3.95
RSP gain from Independent		Swing		

=== 1980 ===
There were 99,368 registered voters in the constituency for the 1980 election.

1980 Kerala Legislative Assembly election: Kunnathur
Party	Candidate	Votes	%	±%
RSP	Kallada Narayanan	40,582	55.75	▼7.55
JNP	Kottakuzhi Sukumaran	29,686	40.78	
Independent	Sasthamcotta ramechandran	1,919	2.64	
Independent	K S Chellappan	384	0.53	
Independent	R Kochukunju Bhavathar	221	0.3	
Margin of victory		10,896	14.97	▼10.93
Turnout		73,170	73.64%	▼6.96
RSP hold		Swing		

=== 1977 ===
There were 87,416 registered voters in the constituency for the 1977 election.

1977 Kerala Legislative Assembly election: Kunnathur
Party	Candidate	Votes	%	±%
RSP	Kallada Narayanan	43,347	63.3	
CPI(M)	C K Thankappan	25,103	36.7	
Margin of victory		18,244	25.9	
Turnout		70,435	80.6%	
RSP hold		Swing		

=== 1970 ===
There were 75,961 registered voters in the constituency for the 1970 election.

1970 Kerala Legislative Assembly election: Kunnathur
Party	Candidate	Votes	%	±%
RSP	Sathyapalan	29,008	52.27	
Independent	Onamplam Prabhakaran	17,528	31.58	
KEC	T Krishnan	6,203	11.18	
Independent	C K Kunju Kunju	1,833	3.3	
Independent	Chandran	495	0.89	
Independent	T K Kunju Kunju	428	0.77	
Margin of victory		11,480	20.69	
Turnout		55,989	73.71%	
RSP gain from INC		Swing		

=== 1957 ===
There were 1,08,583 registered voters in the constituency for the 1957 election.

1957 Kerala Legislative Assembly election: Kunnathur
Party	Candidate	Votes	%	±%
CPI	Madhavan Pillai	41,569	24.49	
CPI	Govindan R	37,321	21.99	
INC	Velayudhan Nair K	29,389	17.32	
INC	C Achuthan	25,982	15.31	
RSP	Krishna Sasthri K S	11,698	6.89	
PSP	Gopalan Nair	10,542	6.21	
RSP	Philipose Muthalali N P	8,092	4.77	
PSP	Kochukunju	5,136	3.03	
Margin of victory				
Turnout		1,69,729	156.31%	
CPI win (new seat)				
