= Ullas Kovur =

Indian politician (born 1980)

Member of the Kerala Legislative Assembly
- Incumbent
- Assumed office 2026
- Preceded by: Kovoor Kunjumon
- Constituency: Kunnathur Assembly constituency
- Majority: 25,314

Personal details
- Born: 1980 (age 45–46) Kunnathur, Kollam district, Kerala, India
- Party: Revolutionary Socialist Party
- Education: MS University
- Occupation: Politician

Ullas Kovur (born 1980) is an Indian politician from Kerala. He is a member of the Kerala Legislative Assembly from the Kunnathur Assembly constituency which is reserved for Scheduled Caste community, in Kollam district representing the Revolutionary Socialist Party (India).

== Early life and education ==
Kovur is from Kunnathur, Kollam district, Kerala. He is the son of Thankappan. He completed his BA.in History at a college affiliated with MS University, Tamil Nadu in 2018. Earlier, he did a diploma in Visual Media and Communication and passed the examinations conducted by Board of VHES, Kerala in 1997. He declared assets worth Rs.6 lakhs in his affidavit to the Election Commission of India.

== Career ==
Kovur won the Kunnathur Assembly constituency representing the Revolutionary Socialist Party (India) in the 2026 Kerala Legislative Assembly election. He polled 81,488 votes and defeated his nearest rival and five time MLA, Kovoor Kunjumon of the Revolutionary Socialist Party (Leninist), by a margin of 25,314 votes.
