= Kizhakkekallada =

- Village
- Interactive map of Kizhakkekallada
- Coordinates: 9.0174100°N 76.650880°E
- Country: India
- State: Kerala
- District: Kollam

Area
  - Total: 13.2 km^{2} (5.1 sq mi)

Population (2011)
  - Total: 21,820
  - Density: 1,650/km^{2} (4,280/sq mi)

Languages
  - Official: Malayalam, English
- Time zone: UTC+5:30 (IST)
- PIN: 691502
- Telephone code: 91474-258XXXX
- Vehicle registration: KL-2?? XXXX
- Nearest city: Kollam
- Sex ratio: 1120 ♂/♀
- Lok Sabha constituency: Mavelikkara
- Vidhan Sabha constituency: Kunnathur

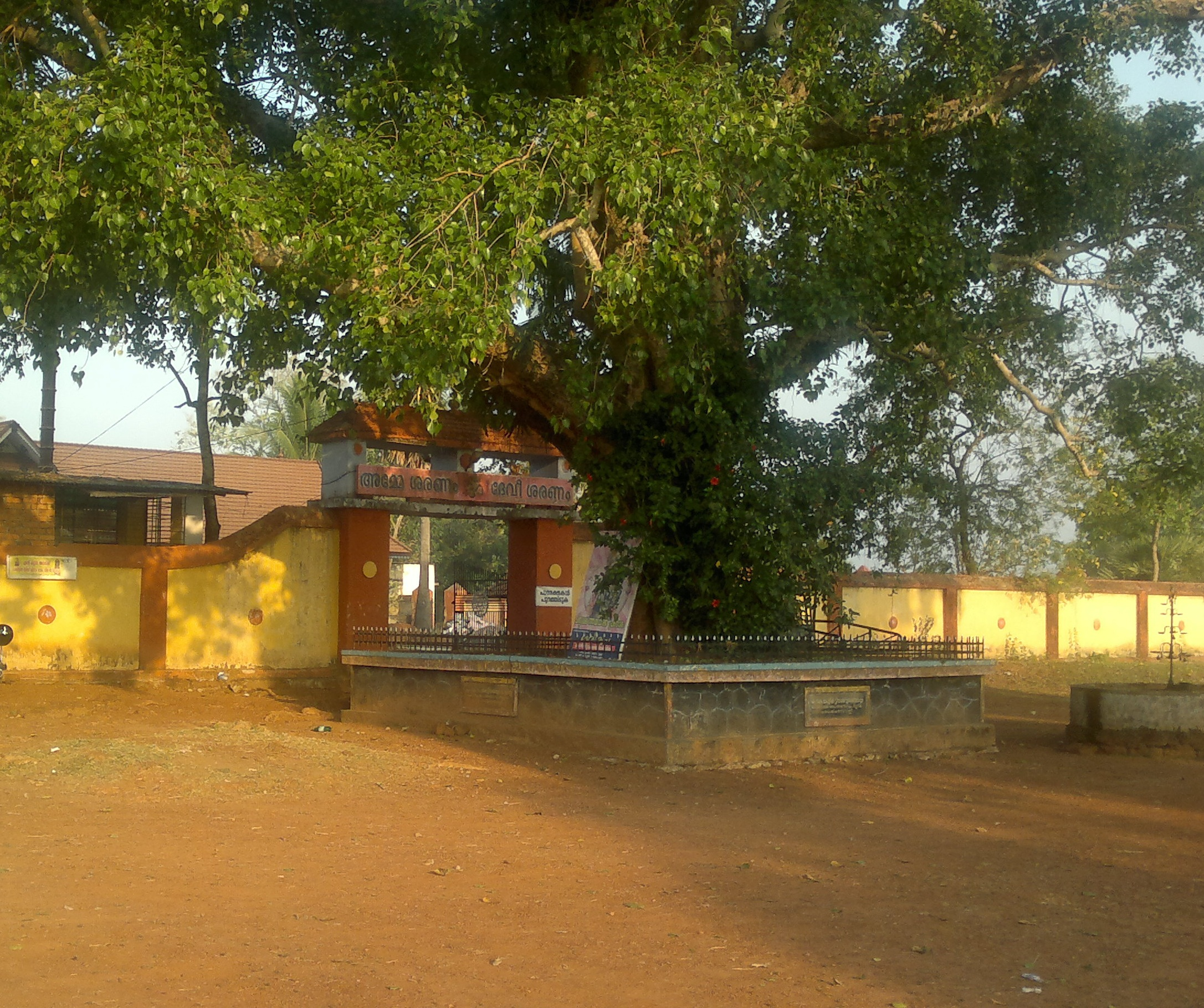
Sree Durgadevi Temple

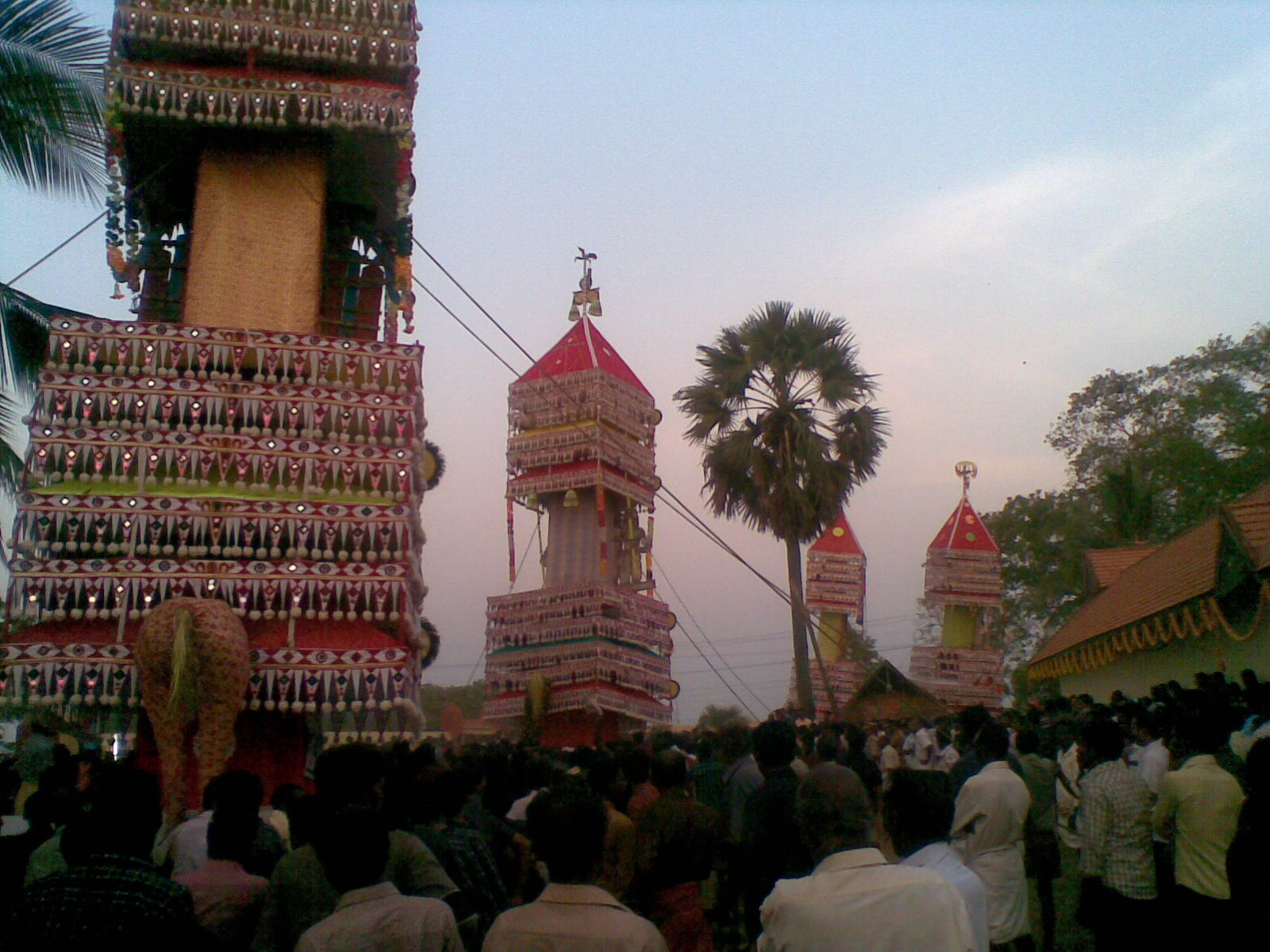
Chittumala Ultsavam (in Malayalam)--A Religious Festival .

Kizhakkekallada, also known as East Kallada, is a large village in the Kollam district in the state of Kerala, India. It is located about 20 kilometres (12 mi) northeast of Kollam.

== History ==
Kallada is believed to be the old port Nelcynda which was mentioned in the Periplus of the Erythraean Sea. The Periplus states that:

… Nelcynde is distant from Muziris "Mosiris is the Greco-Roman name of an ancient port city on the coast of Malabar." By river and sea about five hundred stadia, and is of another Kingdom, the Pandian. This place is also situated on a river, about one hundred and twenty stadia from the sea.

=== Travancore Kingdom ===
In 1730, Unni Keralavarma of Desinganadu invaded the village, which was at that time a part of the region of Venad. This prompted Marthanda Varma of Travancore to retaliate against Desinganadu, adding Kizhakkekallada to his holdings and continuing to invade many more small countries to the north.

=== Buddhist culture ===
It is believed that, centuries ago, Kizhakkekallada was a flourishing center of Buddhist culture. The customs and architecture of old temples in this area suggest a history of Buddhism viharas when these temples were first built. In addition, eduppukuthira (Note: Eduppukuthira are huge chariots associated with the festival of Sree Durga Devi temple.) in the area have strong associations with Buddhist customs and practices. The clear presence of an Ezhava community in the area is also thought to be strong evidence supporting the existence of Buddhism. In 1978, a 3 ft (0.91 m) Buddha statue made of marble was excavated by accident near Sinkarapalli, (Note: The "Palli" suffix was commonly used in Pali, the language of Theravada Buddhism.) a temple dedicated to Shiva. In 1984, the same statue was placed at another temple to Shiva in Koduvila, from which it was later stolen.

== Population ==
According to the 2011 Indian census, Kizhakkekallada had a population of 21,820 consisting of 10,292 men and 11,528 women. The density of the population was 1,653 people per square kilometer. The sex ratio (the number of females per 1000 males) was 1.120. Males constituted 47% of the population and females 53%. Children aged 0–6 made up 9.32% (2033) of the population. The literacy rate in Kizhakkekallada village was 95.44%.

== Places of Worship ==
Chittumala Sree Durga Devi temple is the most important place of worship in this area among Hindus. The temple is situated on the Chittumala hilltop and is devoted to Sree Durga Devi. A Hindu festival associated with this temple is known for its huge chariots which are carried by devotees up to the temple.

Other temples are Sree Mahadevar Temple Koduvila, Major Marthandapuram Sree Krishna Temple Marthandapuram, Sree Narayanapuram Temple Marthandapuram, Edavana Kalari Sree Durga Devi Temple and Sree Mahavishnu Temple Veranoor. The incomplete inscription in the Veranoor Temple in Tamil and Vatteluttu was identified and mentioned by the Archaeological Survey of India.

There are several Christian churches in the village as well. The major church in the area is the Roman Catholic St. Francis Xavier Church, which is one of several ancient Latin Catholic churches in the region. Other churches in the village include St. Anthony's, St. Alphonsa, St. Elijah's, St. Mary's, and St. George.

== Notable people ==
- Suresh Babu (1953–2011): Olympic long jumper
- D. Vinayachandran (1946–2013): poet
