= Iverkala =

Village locality in Kollam district, Kerala, India

- Village
- Location in Kerala, India Iverkala (India)
- Coordinates: 9°04′26.0″N 76°42′15.9″E
- Country: India
- State: Kerala
- District: Kollam
- Taluk: Kunnathur

Government
  - Type: Grama Panchayat
  - Body: Poruvazhy Grama Panchayat
- Elevation: 24 m (79 ft)

Languages
  - Official: Malayalam
- Time zone: UTC+5:30 (IST)
- PIN: 691507
- Vehicle registration: KL-24

Iverkala is a rural village locality in Kollam district in the Indian state of Kerala. Situated near the banks of the Kallada River, the region is known for its agricultural landscape, riverine geography, temples, and local folklore associated with the Mahabharata. The village lies within the wider Kunnathur region of Kollam district and is connected to nearby settlements including Attuvassery, Kadampanadu, Mannady and Thekkumchery.

Iverkala is often distinguished from the coastal tourist town of Varkala in Thiruvananthapuram district, despite similarities in pronunciation. Unlike Varkala, Iverkala is an inland agrarian settlement with a predominantly rural economy centred around rubber cultivation, small-scale farming, and local trade.

== Etymology ==
The origin of the name Iverkala is traditionally linked to local folklore. According to popular belief, the word derives from the Malayalam words Iver ("five persons") and kala ("place" or "field"). The name is associated with the legend that the five Pandavas from the epic Mahabharata lived in the area during their period of exile near the banks of the Kallada River.

Although there is no documented historical evidence connecting the village to the Pandavas, the story remains an important part of the cultural identity of the locality.

== Geography ==
Iverkala is located in central Kollam district in southern Kerala. The Kallada River flows along the eastern and southern sides of the settlement and plays a major role in the area's agriculture, ecology and settlement patterns.

Neighbouring regions include:

- East – Attuvassery
- South – Thekkumchery
- West – Kadampanadu
- North – Mannady

The terrain consists primarily of low-lying agricultural fields, rubber plantations, coconut groves and small residential clusters. The village experiences a tropical monsoon climate characterised by humid summers and heavy rainfall during the southwest monsoon season.

The locality is commonly divided into:

- Iverkala East – the main postal and commercial area
- Iverkala West – predominantly residential and agricultural

=== River system ===
The Kallada River has historically influenced the economic and social life of the village. Traditional occupations such as farming, inland fishing, clay extraction and limited sand mining developed around the river basin. Seasonal flooding and erosion have also shaped settlement patterns in the surrounding areas.

== History ==
The broader Iverkala region formed part of the erstwhile Kingdom of Travancore. Oral traditions in the area refer to the movement of traders, pilgrims and local rulers through the river-connected settlements of present-day Kollam district.

One of the most prominent local traditions concerns Marthanda Varma, the ruler of Travancore during the eighteenth century. According to regional folklore, the king is believed to have temporarily taken refuge at a place known as Attuvassery Kalathattu while escaping political rivals. Local accounts state that he interacted with villagers and played Chathurangam (an ancient chess-like game) before continuing his journey.

Although the story survives mainly through oral tradition, it remains widely cited in local historical narratives.

== Demographics ==
Iverkala does not constitute an independent census town and is administratively included within surrounding rural administrative units of Kollam district. Malayalam is the primary language spoken in the area.

Like many rural settlements in Kerala, the region has experienced significant social changes due to migration, higher literacy rates, and overseas employment, particularly in Gulf countries.

== Economy ==
Historically, the economy of Iverkala depended largely on agriculture. Paddy cultivation and vegetable farming were once widespread across the region. However, over the late twentieth and early twenty-first centuries, much of the agricultural land was gradually converted into rubber plantations.

The shift away from paddy cultivation has been attributed to labour shortages, lower agricultural returns and migration of younger generations toward government employment, urban occupations and overseas work.

Major economic activities include:

- Rubber cultivation
- Banana farming
- Coconut cultivation
- Cashew processing
- Brick manufacturing
- Small-scale retail trade

=== Agricultural transition ===
The replacement of paddy fields with rubber estates has significantly altered the landscape and local economy. While rubber cultivation provided higher short-term income for many landowners, concerns have also been raised regarding food dependency and declining traditional agriculture.

=== Brick and cashew industries ===
Small brick manufacturing units and cashew-processing centres operate in and around the locality. These industries provide seasonal employment opportunities for residents in neighbouring villages.

=== Sand mining issues ===
Sand mining from the Kallada River was once an important source of income in the region. Environmental concerns relating to riverbank erosion and ecological degradation led to stricter regulation of river sand extraction. Reports regarding unauthorised sand mining activities have periodically emerged from the wider Kallada river basin.

== Culture ==
The cultural life of Iverkala is closely linked to temple festivals, folk traditions and community organisations. Traditional percussion ensembles, processions and seasonal celebrations form part of the annual cultural calendar.

Major festivals observed in the region include:

- Onam
- Vishu
- Annual temple festivals (utsavams)

Traditional art forms associated with central Kerala, including percussion-based performances and ritual temple arts, are occasionally organised during festivals.

== Religion ==
Hindu temples form an important part of the village landscape and social life.

=== Temples ===
Notable temples associated with Iverkala and nearby areas include:

- Keechapillil Devi Temple – a temple dedicated to Bhadrakali and regarded as one of the oldest shrines in the region.
- Thettimuri Sreekrishna Swami Temple – situated near the Kallada River and surrounded by water channels.
- Sree Maha Ganapathi Temple – located in Iverkala West.
- Bharanikkavu Devi Temple
- Karthikeya Temple
- Thrikodeshwaram Shiva Temple

Several temples in the surrounding region are associated with sacred groves (kaavu) and traditional serpent worship practices.

== Education ==
Educational institutions in and around Iverkala include government and community-managed schools. Nearby towns such as Sasthamkotta, Kottarakkara and Pandalam serve as centres for higher secondary and collegiate education.

A notable cultural institution in the locality is the Changanassery Smaraka Granthasala, one of the older libraries associated with the region.

The area also contains schools managed by local organisations including the Nair Service Society.

== Transport ==
Iverkala is connected to nearby towns through local roads and private bus services.

=== Road ===
The locality is accessible from Kollam, Sasthamkotta, Kottarakkara and Puthoor through regional roads and local bus routes. Public transportation mainly consists of private buses and autorickshaws.

=== Rail ===
The nearest railway stations include:

- Ezhukone railway station
- Sasthamkotta railway station
- Kollam Junction railway station

=== Air ===
The nearest major airport is Trivandrum International Airport.

== Administration ==
Iverkala falls under local self-government institutions functioning within Kollam district. Different sections of the locality are associated with neighbouring gram panchayats and administrative blocks.

The region falls under:

- Kunnathur Assembly constituency
- Mavelikara Lok Sabha constituency

== Recent developments ==
In 2025, local discussions regarding the renaming of a junction commonly referred to as Pakistan Mukku received media attention. A proposal supported by local administrative authorities suggested renaming the junction as Iverkala Junction, reflecting local identity and geographic association.

The area has also witnessed gradual infrastructural improvements including road paving, electrification upgrades and expansion of local services.

== See also ==
- Kallada River
- Kunnathur
- Kollam district
- Varkala
- Marthanda Varma
