= Malanada firework disaster =

1990 explosion in Kerala, India

Coordinates: 9°06′09″N 76°39′28″E

The Malanada firework disaster was a disaster in which 33 people lost their lives after a fire broke out in the Malanada temple at Poruvazhy in Kollam district, Kerala, India, on 23 March 1990. An electric spark in the place where the fireworks where stored caused the explosion. At a distance of 1.5 kilometres from Malanada, human remains of the victims were thrown up to Edakkad market. All the buildings around the temple were destroyed.
