= St. Elijah Orthodox Syrian Church, Koduvila =

Orthodox church in Koduvila, India

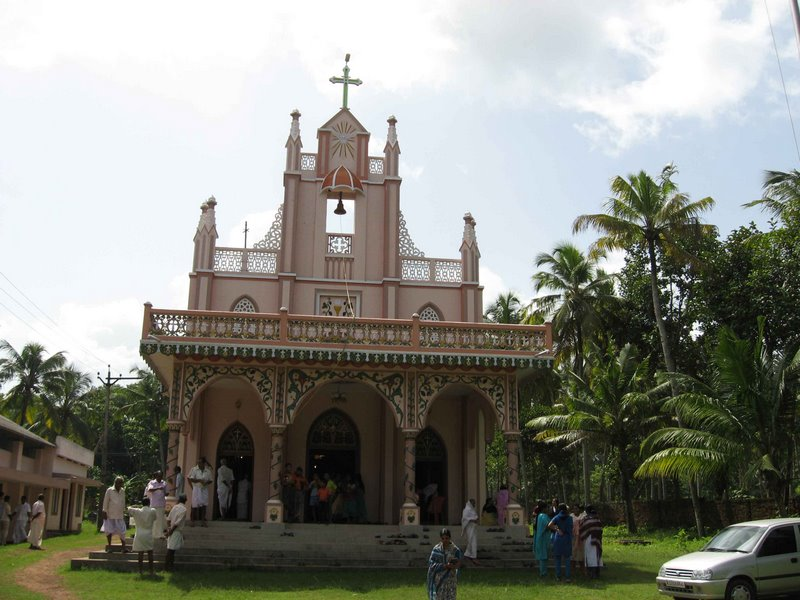
St Elijah Orthodox Syrian Church in 2008

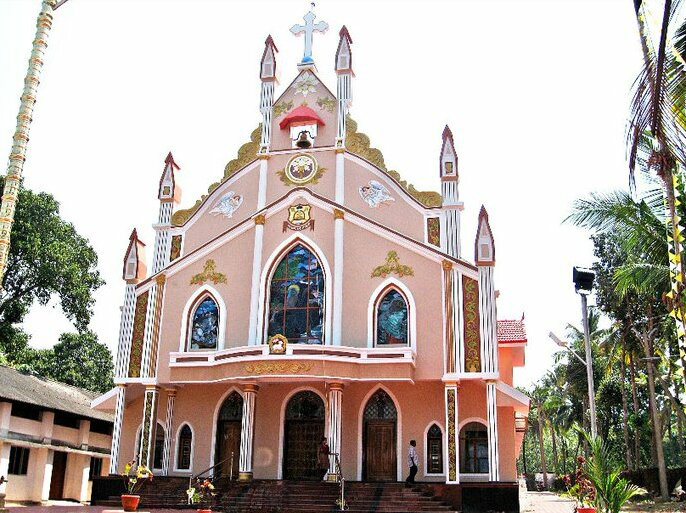
The newly renovated church in 2011

St. Elijah Orthodox Syrian Church, Koduvila, is one of the ancient churches of the Malankara Orthodox Church. The church was established by the Malankara Metropolitan Pulikkottil, Joseph Mar Dionysius V.

== History ==
During the First Several years, members of the church joined with St. Mary's Orthodox Valiyapalli in Kallada, where the graveyard of Mar Andrew is located. To reach the church, the congregation would need to cross the Kallada River for participating in sacramental ceremonies known as the Holy Qurbana.

== Location ==
The church is located near Munroe Island in Kallada.it is located in Kollam Sub-District, India.

== Renovation ==
On 13 September 2008, in the presence of Matthews Mar Epiphanios, the metropolitan of Kochi, Zachariah Mar Anthonios laid the foundation stone of the new church. Its construction is a blend of ancient and modern architecture, with the installation of the main door on 13 September 2009 by Zachariah Mar Anthonios. The people of the local community assisted in construction activities.

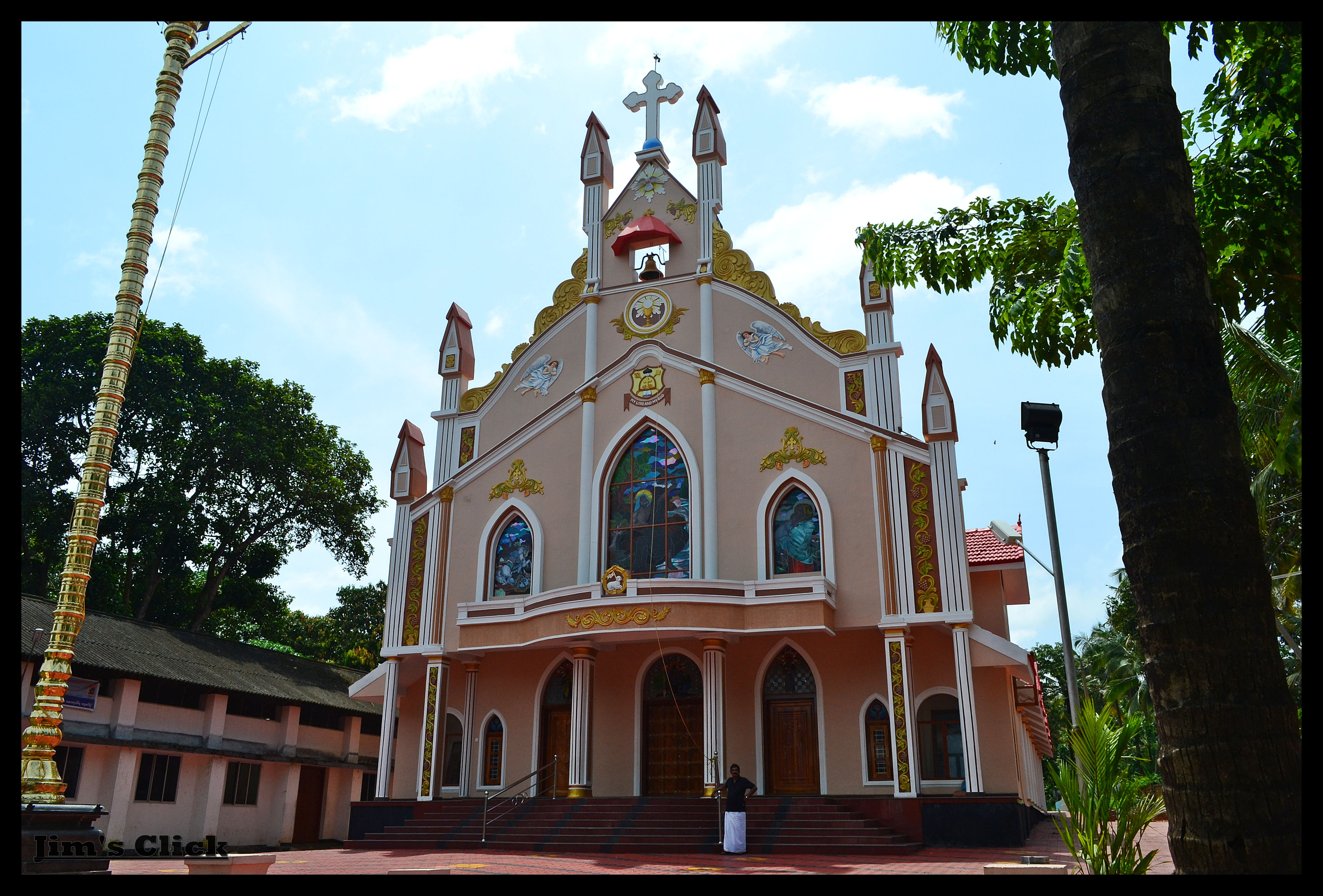
Church in July 2011

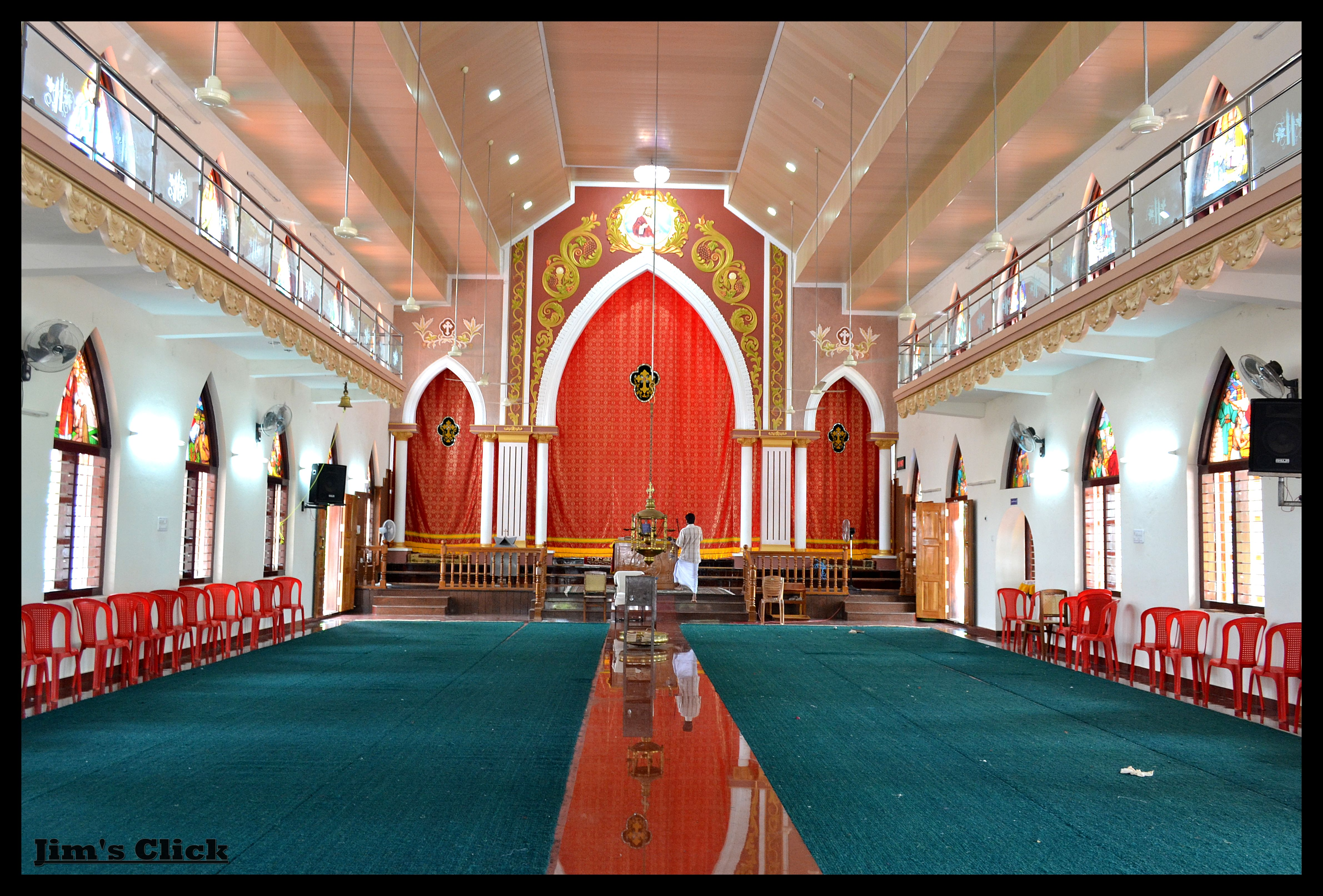
Interior of the renovated Church
