= Anusree =

Indian actress (born 1990)

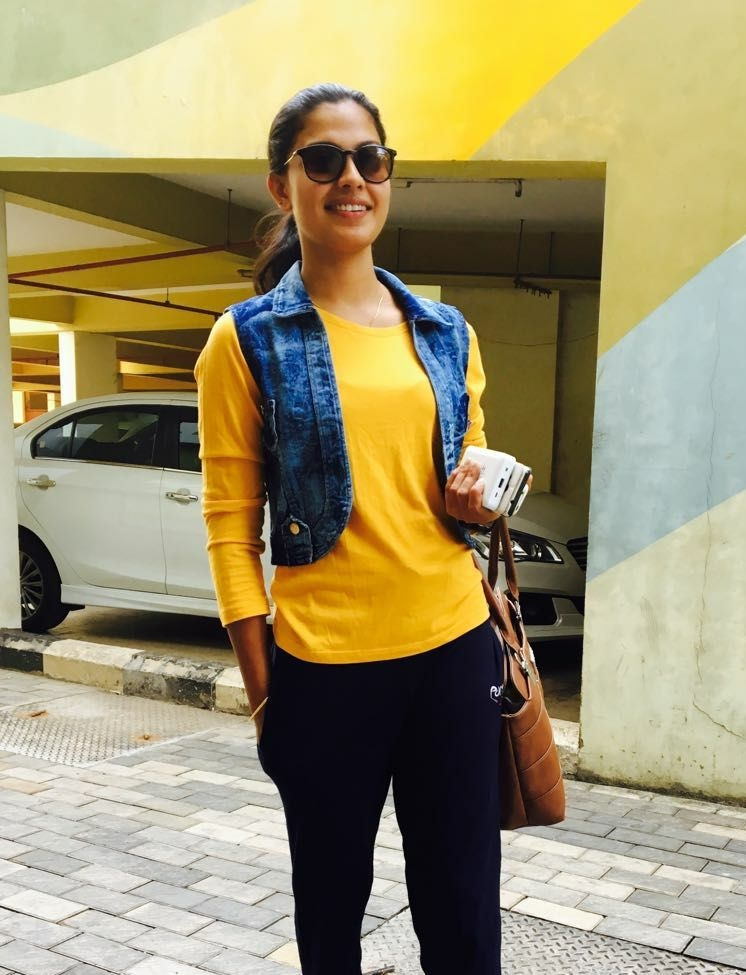
- Anusree in 2023
- Born: 24 October 1990 (age 36); Kamukumchery, Kollam, Kerala, India
- Other name: Anusree Nair
- Occupation: Actress
- Years active: 2012–present

Anusree (born 24 October 1990) is an Indian actress who appears in Malayalam films. She made her acting debut in the 2012 film Diamond Necklace and has acted in a number of Malayalam films in female lead roles.

== Early life ==
Anusree was born on 24 October 1990 in Kerala, to father Muraleedharan Pillai, a clerk at the Kerala Water Authority, and mother Shobhana, a housewife. She was brought up in Kamukumchery, Kollam district. She has an elder brother, Anoop. She went to Indira Gandhi Memorial Vocational Higher Secondary School, Manjakala, Kollam. Her passion for acting started from her school days.

== Career ==
Anusree impressed director Lal Jose while he was judging the acting reality show Vivel Active Fair Big Break on Surya TV, in which she was competing, leading to her film debut as Kalamandalam Rajasree in Lal Jose's 2012 film Diamond Necklace. She then appeared in Left Right Left (2013), Pullipulikalum Aattinkuttiyum (2013), and Angry Babies in Love (2014). She had lead roles in the films Ithihasa (2014) and My Life Partner (2014). In 2016 she appeared in Dileesh Pothan's Maheshinte Prathikaaram and as Police ACP Ganga in Priyadarshan's Oppam. She went on to star in films such as Kochavva Paulo Ayyappa Coelho (2016), Oru Cinemakkaran (2017), Aadhi (2018), and Panchavarnathatha (2018).

Anusree was initially cast in the female lead role in Pulimurugan (2016), opposite to Mohanlal. Due to poor health she was unable to appear in the film. She later worked with Mohanlal in Priyadarshan's Oppam (2016). She also acted in Madhura Raja (2019) opposite to Mammootty.

== Filmography ==
Key
†	Denotes films that have not yet been released

=== Film ===
Year	Title	Role	Notes	Ref.
2012	Diamond Necklace	Kalamandalam Rajasree	Debut film	
2013	Red Wine	Sreelakshmi		
2013	Left Right Left	Deepa		
2013	Pullipulikalum Aattinkuttiyum	Kochurani		
2013	Vedivazhipadu	Rashmi		
2014	My Life Partner	Pavithra		
2014	Naku Penda Naku Taka	Indu		
2014	Angry Babies in Love	Selvi		
2014	Ithihasa	Janaki		
2014	Kurutham Kettavan	Mariya		
2014	Pedithondan	Radhika		
2014	Seconds	Parvathy		
2015	Chandrettan Evideya	Sushama		
2015	Rajamma at yahoo	Naseema		
2016	Maheshinte Prathikaaram	Soumya		
2016	Oppam	ACP Ganga		
2016	Kochavva Paulo Ayyappa Coelho	Anju		
2017	Oru Cinemakkaran	Nayana		
2018	Daivame Kaithozham K. Kumar Akanam	Nirmala		
2018	Aadhi	Jaya		
2018	Panchavarnathatha	Chitra		
2018	Aanakkallan	Neelima		
2018	Autorsha	Anitha/Haseena		
2019	Madhura Raja	Vasanthi		
2019	Safe	Arundati		
2019	Ulta	Pournami		
2019	Prathi Poovankozhi	Rosamma		
2019	My Santa	Deepa Abel		
2021	Keshu Ee Veedinte Nadhan	Leela (Yakshi), Keshu's ex-girlfriend	Cameo appearance	
2022	12th Man	Shiny		
2023	Kallanum Bhagavathiyum	Priyamani		
2023	Voice of Sathyanathan	Anu, Balan's Wife	Cameo appearance	
2024	Thalavan	Ramya		
2024	Kadha Innuvare	Nazeema		
2025	Page	Reny		
2026	Prempaatta †	Shahbaz		
2026	Thaara †	Sithara	Post Production	

=== Television ===
Year	Title	Role	Channel	Notes
2011	Vivel Active Fair Big Break	Contestant	Surya TV	
2015	Comedy Stars Season 2	Judge	Asianet	
2016	Atham Pathu Ruchi 2016	Host; Judge	Mazhavil Manorama	
2016	6 Piece Pizza	Nanda	Asianet	Telefilm
2016	Dhe Chef	Guest	Mazhavil Manorama	
2017	Atham Pathu ruchi 2017	Host; Judge	Mazhavil Manorama	
2022	Comedy Stars Season 3	Judge	Asianet	
2018	Atham Pathu ruchi 2018	Host; Judge	Mazhavil Manorama	
2018–2019	Thakarppan Comedy	Judge	Mazhavil Manorama	
2019	Atham Pathu Ruchi 2019	Host; Judge	Mazhavil Manorama	
2022	Atham Pathu Ruchi 2022	Host; Judge	Mazhavil Manorama	
2020	Lalonam Nallonam	Various roles	Asianet	Onam Special show
2021	Mrs. Hitler	Anu	Zee Keralam	TV series
2022	Red Carpet	Guest	Amrita TV	
2022	Comedy Masters	Judge	Amrita TV	
2022	Super Power	Mentor	Flowers TV	
2022	Music Utsav	Mentor	Flowers TV	
2022	Ennum Sammatham	Anu	Mazhavil Manorama	TV series

Other shows as herself

- Red Carpet
- Chaya Koppayile Kodumkaattu
- Comedy Circus
- Onnum Onnum Moonu
- Onnum Onnum Moonu 2
- Comedy Super Night 2
- Smart Show
- Star Magic
- My G Flower Oru Kodi

== Awards ==
Film	Award	Category	Result	Ref.
Diamond Necklace	Indian Movie Awards (Qatar)	Second Best Actress	Won	
Ithihasa	Campus Choice Cine Awards	Most Popular Actress	Nominated	
