= Peruviruthy =

- village
- Location in Kerala, India Peruviruthy (India)
- Coordinates: 9.67°N 76.3926°E
- Country: India
- State: Kerala
- District: Karunagappally
- Talukas: Adoor

Languages
  - Official: Malayalam, English
- Time zone: UTC+5:30 (IST)

Poruvazhy Peruviruthy Malanada Temple is a temple dedicated to Duryodhana, is located in Poruvazhy Village of Kunnathur Tehsil in the Kollam district of Kerala, India.
