= Sinkarappally =

- village
- Location in Kerala, India Sinkarappally (India)
- Coordinates: 8°59′47″N 76°37′58″E
- Country: India
- State: Kerala
- District: Kollam

Languages
  - Official: Malayalam, English
- Time zone: UTC+5:30 (IST)
- PIN: 691502
- Telephone code: 0474
- Vehicle registration: KL-02
- Coastline: 0 kilometres (0 mi)
- Nearest city: Kollam
- Lok Sabha constituency: Kollam
- Climate: Tropical monsoon (Köppen)
- Avg. summer temperature: 35 °C (95 °F)
- Avg. winter temperature: 20 °C (68 °F)

Sinkarappally (koduvila)is a small scenic ward situated between Ashtamudi Lake and Kallada River, on the outskirts of Kollam District in Kerala.
