= Sooranad =

Sooranad North
- Village
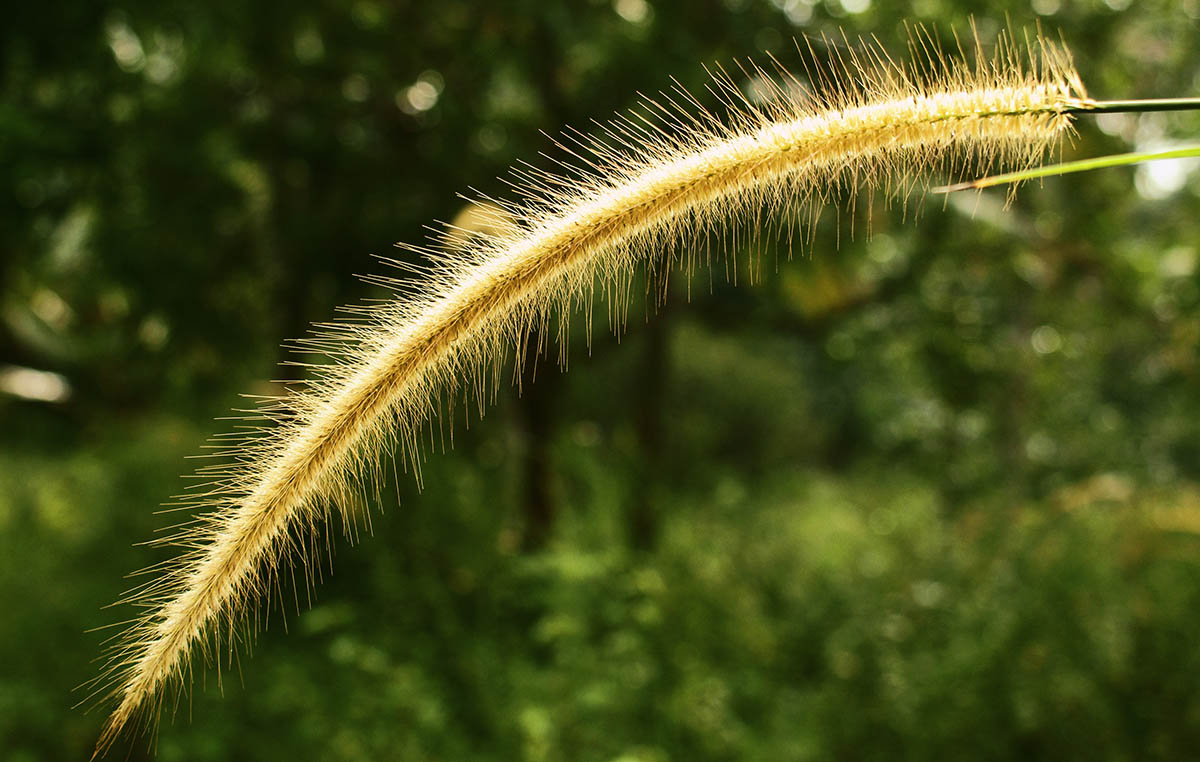
- Wild grass found in Sooranad
- Interactive map of Sooranad North
- Coordinates: 9.1144600°N 76.6340500°E
- Country: India
- State: Kerala
- District: Kollam

Government
  - Body: Gram panchayat

Population (2011)
  - Total: 28,471

Languages
  - Official: Malayalam, English
- Time zone: UTC+5:30 (IST)
- PIN: 690561 (Sooranad North P.O), 690522 (Sooranad P.O)
- Telephone code: 0476
- Vehicle registration: KL-61
- Nearest city: Karunagappally
- Vidhan Sabha constituency: Kunnathur
- Climate: moderate (Köppen)

Sooranad North is a village in Kollam district in the south west Indian state of Kerala. It is believed that Sooranad was ruled by King SOORAN and hence the name.

The village is part of Kunnathur Taluk, which lies in Kerala's Kollam District and sits on the border of the Kollam, Pathanamthitta and Allappuzha Districts. Sooranad North and Sooranad South are collectively known as Sooranad and have their own local panchayats. Sooranad North covers an area of 22.67 square kilometres (8.75 sq mi) and is 9 kilometres (5.6 mi) from Sasthamcotta, 30 kilometres (19 mi) from Kollam, 90 kilometres (56 mi) from the state capital Thiruvananthapuram and 15 kilometres (9.3 mi) from Karunagappalli, which is the nearest city. Sooranad North's Pin Code is 690561.

== Geography ==
A tributary of the Kallada River flows through this village as well as the Pallikkal River. Across this there is a dam that can irrigate about 200 acres (81 ha) of paddy and other summer crops. There are many markets in Sooranad such as Kannamath chandha, Vayyankara chantha, and Parakkadavu chantha.

== Schools ==
There are three Higher Secondary schools: the Government High School of Sooranadu and the Santhinikethan Model High School, and other Upper Primary School (R.K.U.P. and Govt. L.P.S Anayadi other upper and Lower Primary Schools provide basic education to both the local students from other administrative subdivisions (taluks).Some other important schools in Sooranad north are B.M.M.II Central School, T.D.B Central School and Chakkuvally Government School. The main school of Sooranad North is GHSS Sooranad around 1500 students are studying in the school. The school contains 12 up classes and 21 high school classes and several secondary classes.the school has many clubs and several organisations are being working in this school the school is better in science fairs and school Kalolsavam. The school has won many prizes in several exhibitions. Some celebrities such as Sooranad Nelson studied in this school. The main sports events in the school are mainly football and athletics. The school has a stadium.. The school is now upgraded to a high tech school.

== Economy ==
The main employment for men and women of the village is cashew nut processing, which takes place in several factories. There are also workers who manufacture tiles and "country burnt" bricks. In addition, there are people who work as casual laborers. Nowadays many people in Sooranad have set up their own shops. Some came back to the agricultural field while many left.

=== Banks ===
==== Kerala Gramin Bank ====
Anayadi Branch. Kerala Gramin Bank or KGB in short, is India’s largest Regional Rural Bank, headquartered at Malappuram in Kerala, India. The bank is jointly owned by Central and State Governments & sponsored by Canara Bank. Address: Vilayil Kesava Kurup Memorial Building, Kollam-Theni Highway.

==== Co-operative bank ====
The Sooranad gramodhaarana service co-operative bank 3947 is the leading financial concern that began as early as in 28.3.1956

Nationalised Banks, State Bank of India, Central bank of India also situated in Sooranad

== Notable people ==
Padmasri Dr. Sooranad Kunjan Pillai, the renowned poet, writer, and linguistic expert who formulated Malayalam Lexicon, hailed from the area. Barrister N. Padmanabha pillai of Panayamcherril veedu, of vayyankara who was member of Sreemoolam Assembly and Municipal Chairman, Kollam during whose time the clocktower in Kollam was built. Sri.Thennala Balakrishnapillai former KPCC president, Sri.Gangadharakurup former PSC chairman, Sri R Chandrasekharan INTUC president and ILO member, Sri. Jomon Sooranad is famous international chef who appears many cookery shows in media. Late Vaiankara Madhusoodanan, professor in music college T.V.M, was a well recognised classical music singer who belongs to Vaiankara Anayadi. Vayyankara Raghavakurup was an activist (and representative to Grama panchayat for a term) who was the soul force behind Gramodharana Service Co-op.bank, Gramod harana Grandha sala and vayanasala, Anayadi post office, vaiankara cattle market etc.

Nelson Sooranad is a standup comedian and actor who is active in Malayalam film and television. With 23 years of experience in mimicry, Nelson Sooranad is known for his talent in entertaining others with witty performance and dialogues. He has acted in films like ‘Small Family’, ‘Spanish Masala’, ‘Romans’, ‘Kutteem Kolum’, ‘Rajadhi Raja’ ‘Adu Oru Bheekara Jeeviyaanu’ and ‘ATM’. He is now a very important part of all Malayalam Comedy Shows.soumya sadanandan is a director and actress. Sooranad Ravi (1943 February 7 - 2018 October 24) is a children's literature writer and translator who has authored over a hundred works in Malayalam literature, including short stories, poems and translations.

Rajesh Babu K Sooranad, the HR Professional turned Film Producer is hailing from Sooranad. He has worked with nearly twenty movies as Music Director and produced movies like "Perfume- Her Fragrance", "Binary " and "Zha, The incessant rain"

== Culture ==
=== Temples ===
There are many temples in Sooranad including, Komalavalleeswaram temple, Anayadi Narasimhaswamy temple, Azhakiyakavu Kurumbakalee temple, Puthiyakavu Temple, Kalarivathukkal temple, Sreenarayanapuram Mahadeva temple, Puthiyidam Sreekrishnaswami temple, Kunniradathu Malanada temple, Ponal Kalari Shree Bhuvaneswari Temple. Anayadi Pazhayidam Narasimhamoorthi temple and Anayadi Puthiyidam Sreekrishnaswami temple are under one administration and the former is famous for "Anayadi pooram" with hundred and odd elephants partaking to decorate the festival. Ennasheri Malanada Temple where Dussasana of the Kauravas is considered to be the god is situated at Thekkemuri. Veetinal Devi temple (near parakkadavu) its situated near the bank of pallikkal river.

In Sooranadu, temples dedicated to Shani Dev exist, but according to sources, the ancient temple associated with the Mahabharata period is Vaishnodevi Saneeswara Devasthanam.

=== Festivals ===
A large elephant festival, the Anayadi Gajamela, takes place at Anayadi Narasimha Moorthy Temple and involves a hundred-odd caparisoned elephants lined up accompanied by a traditional orchestra. The ten-day festival is conducted every year on the Thiruvonam day in the month of Makaram. Devotees offer 250–300 elephants almost every year. The main deity of the temple is Narasimha, the lion-headed incarnation of Lord Vishnu. Anayadi Gajamela has become a favourite with locals and has also found a place on the tourism map. Anayadi Narasimha Moorthy Temple is located on the northern border of Kollam district of which Pathanamthitta and Alappuzha districts share the boundaries. It is also reachable from Adoor through kayamkulam punaloor road, taking deviation at pazhakulam to left /nooranad to left via panayil (18 km) charummood to left via thamarakulam (20 km) and also from Sasthamcotta >bharanikavu >chakkuvally>anayadi (the road is now a part of 'Kollam-theni' State Highway) that joins K.P. road at Charummood).

== Kunnathur Taluk ==
The following villages are part of Kunnathur Taluk:

- Kunnathur
- Sasthamcottah
- West Kallada
- Poruvazhy
- Sooranad North
- Sooranad South
- Mynagappally

== See also ==
- Sooranad South
