= Manampuzha =

- village
- Interactive map of Manampuzha
- Country: India
- State: Kerala
- District: Kollam

Languages
  - Official: Malayalam, English
- Time zone: UTC+5:30 (IST)
- Vehicle registration: KL-

Manampuzha is a small place in Kunnathur Village Panchayat, in Kunnathur Taluk, Kollam district, Kerala, India.

== Landmarks ==
There is a temple, a government primary school, an English medium convent school, a church etc. in this place.

== Trikkanappuram Temple ==
The temple called "Manampuzha Trikkannapuram Mahadeva Temple" is a small famous which gets fame across the area these days. The festival will be conducted every year on 10th day of Medam. 'Pathamudayam'
