= Kunnathur =

Kunnathur may refer to the following places in India:

- Kunnathur, Kerala
- Kunnathur, Kerala Assembly constituency
- Kunnathur, Tamil Nadu Assembly constituency
- Kunnathur, Tirupur
