= Nelcynda =

Ancient port town in Kerala, India

Nelcynda (Ancient Greek: Νέλκυνδα, also Nelkynda) was an early historic inland port town and settlement located in what is now Kerala, on the Malabar Coast, in southern India. It is mentioned by several classical Greco-Roman authors, including Pliny the Elder and Ptolemy, as well as in the Periplus of the Erythraean Sea and on the Peutingerian Table. No archaeological evidence has been found for Nelcynda. The port is also not attested in either early Tamil poems (the Sangam Literature) or in Tamil-Brahmi inscriptions.

Nelcynda is commonly mentioned alongside "Becare", another early historic port on the Malabar Coast, which likely served as its loading site. According to Greco-Roman geographers, Becare, located on the seacoast, was linked to Nelcynda, possibly via an inland river. Ptolemy identified the river on which Nelcynda was situated as the "Baris". The Periplus appears to suggest that both Becare and Nelcynda were located on the same river. Scholars have also noted that, between the time of Pliny the Elder and Ptolemy, Muziris (Muchiri) rose in importance while the ports of Bacare and Nelcynda declined.

The ports of Bacare and Nelcynda are listed as "towns" under the rule of the Pandya (the Pandiôn) kings in the Periplus. Scholars suggest that Nelcynda may have been under the control of the Ay (the Aioi) rulers, a prominent lineage in early historic southern Kerala, who were traditionally vassals of the Pandya rulers.

== Variations ==
Nelcynda/Nelkynda (Νελκύνδα) is mentioned by various Greco-Roman authors under slightly different names. In Ptolemy's Geography (VII. 1), it appears as "Melkynda" (Μελκύνδα) or Melkyda (Μελκύδα), which he places within the territory of the Ay rulers. The Peutingerian Table (XI) probably records it as "Nincildae", while the Geographer of Ravenna refers to it as "Nilcinna".

In his "Natural History", Pliny the Elder does not recognize the port of Nelcynda, instead referring only to a "gens Neacyndon" or the Neacyndus-people (VI. 26).

== Citations ==
=== Periplus of the Erythraean Sea ===
The ports of Bacare and Nelcynda are mentioned as towns under the Pandya rulers in the Periplus. It also states that Nelcynda was located 500 stades (~ 92 km; by river and sea) from Muziris (Muchiri) and about 22 km from Bacare, which was situated on the coast (i. e., 22 km via the river). Additionally, it mentions that both Bacare and Nelcynda were situated along the same river. According to the author of the Periplus, Nelcynda served as the location where ships were unloaded and spent the winter, while Bacare (on the mouth of the river) was used for loading return cargoes. The presence of sandbanks and narrow channels made loading at Nelcynda impractical.

The author also states that the main centers of commercial activity on the Malabar Coast were the ports of Muziris (Muchiri) and Nelcynda, while the ports of Naura (Naravu?) and Tyndis (Thondi) played a more peripheral role.

Beyond Calliena there are other market-towns of this region; Semylla, Mandagora, Pala patma, Meligara, Byzantium, Togarum and Aurannohoas. Then there are the islands called Sesecrienae and that of the Aegidii, and that of the Caenitae, opposite the place called Chersonesus (and in these places there are pirates) and after this the White Island. Then come Naura and Tyndis, the first markets of Damirica, and then Muziris and Nelcynda, which are now of leading importance.

Tyndis is of the Kingdom of Cerobothra; it is a village in plain sight by the sea. Muziris, of the same Kingdom, abounds in ships sent there with cargoes from Arabia, and by the Greeks; it is located on a river, distant from Tyndis by river and sea five hundred stadia, and up the river from the shore twenty stadia. Nelcynda is distant from Muziris by river and sea about five hundred stadia, and is of another Kingdom, the Pandian. This place also is situated on a river, about one hundred and twenty stadia from the sea.

There is another place at the mouth of this river, the village of Bacare; to which ships drop down on the outward voyage from Nelcynda, and anchor in the roadstead to take on their cargoes; because the river is full of shoals and the channels are not clear. The kings of both these market-towns live in the interior. And as a sign to those approaching these places from the sea there are serpents coming forth to meet you, black in color, but shorter, like snakes in the head, and with blood-red eyes.

— The Periplus of the Erythraean Sea, 53-55

=== The Natural History ===
Pliny the Elder (c. 23–79 CE) provides a detailed account of voyages to India during the 1st century CE, referring to numerous Indian ports in his work The Natural History. He notably mentions that the ports of Becare and Nelcynda were preferable to the port of Muziris.

But for them that would make a voiage to the Indians, the most commodious place to st forward is Ocelis: for from thence, and with the West wind called Hypalus, they have a passage of fortie daies sailing to the first towne of merchandise in India, called Muziris. Howbeit a port this is, not greatly in request, for the daunger of pirates and rovers, which keepe ordinarily about a place called Hydræ and besides that, it is not richly stored and furnished with merchandise. And more than so, the harborough is farre from the towne, so as they must charge and discharge their ware too and fro in little boats. At the time when I wrote this storie, the king that reigned there, was named Celebothras. But another haven there is more commodious, belonging to the Necanidians, which they cal Becare: the kings name at this present is Pandion: not far off is another town of merchandise within the firme land, called Madusa. As for that region, from whence they transport pepper in small punts or troughes made of one peece of wood, it is named Cotona.

== Present location ==
Despite references — such as the description of Nelcynda being "about five hundred stadia from Muziris by river and sea" — and other geographical details, the precise location of Nelcynda has yet to be definitively established.

According to modern scholars, if the Greco-Roman navigators had properly transliterated the original Tamil term, interpretations in which "l" and "k" meet must be rejected, as this would result in a stop — e.g., *nil kunram becoming nirkunram ("the Rice Hill"). However, interpretations such as nil-kunram ("the Long Hill") or nil-kuntam ("the Long Lake") are plausible, as they involve the alveolar "l". Furthermore, it is historically inaccurate to refer to "Nilkantha", "Nilgunda", and similar forms, since the omission of the schwa at word endings was a later development and is not found in the ancient Indian languages.

Identification of Nelcynda
Location or identification	Author (source)	Notes
Kottayam	Sastri; 1955, Gurukkal and Whittakker; 2001, and Schoff (and Bacare with Purakkad)	
Kallada or Kannetti on the Kallada River	Yule; 1882 and Dr. Burnell and R. Caldwell	
Nirkunnam on the Meenachil River	Kanakasabhai; 1904	
Nakkada, or Nakkida near Thiruvalla	Gurukkal; 2016	
Niranam (formerly known as Niganda/Nikanda and Nilarnam)	Iyengar; 1926 and Casson; 1989 and IC Chacko; 1979	
Purakkad	Gurukkal and Whittakker; 2001	
Alappuzha	Gurukkal and Whittakker; 2001	

=== Kallada/Kannetti ===
Yule (1882) suggested that Nelcynda was probably Kallada or Kannetti, noting that this identification matched the description of a port situated on a river.

"The absolute identification of the last [Nelkynda] is not easy, but it was probably Kallada, on a river of the same name entering the backwaters, the only navigable river south of Perriar at Cranganore. This is probably the same place as Kannetti, famous in the legendary history of Malabar; and it is still a great entrepot for Travancore pepper, which is sent hence to the ports on the coast for shipment. That Nelkynda cannot have been far from this is clear from the vicinity of the Πυρρὸν ὄρος or Red Hill of the Periplus, which is mentioned in immediate succession to the mouth of the river of Nelkynda. There can be no question that this is the bar of red laterite which, a short distance south of Quilon, cuts short the backwater navigation, and is thence called the Warkallé Barrier. It forms abrupt cliffs on the sea, without beach, and these cliffs are still known to seamen (as the navigation books show) as the Red Cliffs. This is the only thing like a sea-cliff from Cannanore (or perhaps from Mount d'Ely) to Cape Comorin"

— "Notes on the Oldest Records of the Sea-route to China from Western Asia"

Dr. Burnell and R. Caldwell tentatively identified Nelcynda with Kannetti.

I content myself with simply noting the following names of places on the Malabar coast. Muziris appears to be the Muyiri of Muyiri-cotta; Tyndis is Tundi; and the Kynda of Nelkynda (or as Ptolemy has it Melkynda, i.e., probably Western Kynda) seems to be Kannettri, the southern boundary of Kerala proper. One MS. of Pliny writes the second part of this word not cyndon, but canidon. The first of these places was identified by Dr Gundert; for the remaining two we are indebted to Dr Burnell.

— Robert Caldwell, "A Comparative Grammar of the Dravidian or South Indian Family of Languages"

=== Niranam ===
The identification of Nelcynda with Niranam is considered plausible based on its medieval names, "Nikanda" and "Nilarnam", as mentioned in the Keralolpathi traditions. It is also a popular candidate due to its association with ancient Christian traditions. However, there is a lack of geographical/archaeological evidence to confirm that present-day Niranam functioned as an ancient port.

== In fiction ==
In 2012, Susan Visvanathan published a novella inspired by Nelcynda, titled Nelycinda and Other Stories (Roli Books).

Famous Malayalam Novelist and Civil Servant, M P Lipin Raj have written a novel about Nelcynda Port named ‘Anti-Karma’ published by DC Books, Kottayam. His English Fiction ‘The Karma Paradox’ by Magicmoon Publishers, New Delhi also based on Nelcynda Port near Niranam, Thiruvalla.

== See also ==
- Muziris
- Ay kingdom
- Kollam
- Kollam Port
