= Kovoor Kunjumon =

Indian politician

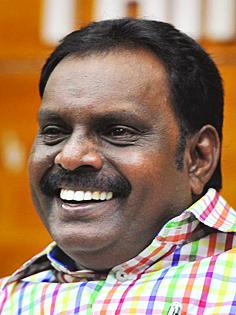
- Kovoor Kunjumon

Member of Kerala Legislative Assembly
- In office 13 May 2001 – 21 May 2026
- Preceded by: T. Nanoo Master
- Succeeded by: Ullas Kovoor
- Constituency: Kunnathur

Personal details
- Born: 25 May 1968 (age 58)
- Party: Revolutionary Socialist Party (Leninist)

Kovoor Kunjumon (born 25 May 1968) is an Indian politician from RSP(L). He represented Kunnathur constituency from 2001 till 2026. Kunjumon has won five times since 2001 from Kunnathur constituency.
