= R. Govindan =

Indian politician

R. Govindan (1928-10 November 2005) was an Indian politician and leader of Communist Party of India. He represented Kunnathoor constituency in 1st Kerala Legislative Assembly.
