= Kunnathur, Kerala =

Village in Kollam District, Kerala, India

Coordinates: 9°5′4.91″N 76°39′21.39″E

Kunnathur
- Constituency for the Kerala Legislative Assembly
- State: Kerala
- District: Kollam
- Major settlements: List: Panchayaths Sooranad North Sooranad South Poruvazhy Sasthamcotta Mynagappally Kunnathur Nediyavila Kallada; Neighbourhood Towns Sasthamcotta Bharanikkavu Puthoor Mynagappally

Current constituency
- Political party: Revolutionary Socialist Party
- Member of the Legislative Assembly: Ullas Kovoor
- Opponent: Kovoor Kunjumon
- Opponent party: Revolutionary Socialist (L M) Party
- Vote Margin: 25314

Kunnathur (Kunnattūr,കുന്നത്തൂർ) is a taluk in Kollam district in the Indian state of Kerala.

The capital of Kunnathur taluk is Sasthamkotta. The major portion of Kerala's largest freshwater lake, Sasthamcotta Lake, is in Kunnathur. The Kallada River flows eastward within Kunnathur near the Kokkamkave Durga Devi Temple. It is within the border of the Kollam district and borders the Pathanamthitta district. Kunnathur is the smallest taluk in Kerala. Ullas Kovoor of RSP is the present elected member from Kunnathur assembly constituency.

== Geography ==
Kunnathur taluk lies in the northern part of Kollam district. The taluk covers an area of about 138 km². It is bordered by Pathanapuram and Kottarakkara in the east, Karunagappally in the west, and Alappuzha in the north.

== Administration ==
Kunnathur is one of the five taluks of Kollam district. The taluk headquarters is located at Sasthamkotta. It consists of several villages and panchayats, including:

- Sooranad North
- Sooranad South
- Sasthamcotta
- West Kallada
- Mynagappally
- Poruvazhy
- Pavithreswaram

== Demographics ==
According to the 2011 Census of India, Kunnathur taluk had a population of 199,456. The population is primarily Malayalam-speaking, with Hinduism, Islam, and Christianity as the major religions.

== Landmarks ==
- Sasthamcotta Lake – the largest freshwater lake in Kerala.
- Sasthamcotta Sree Dharma Sastha Temple – an important pilgrimage center.

== Major settlements ==
Kunnathur taluk contains:

- Sooranad North
- Sooranad South
- Mynagappally
- Sasthamkotta
- Poruvazhi
- Kunnathur
- West Kallada

== See also ==
- Kollam district
- Taluks of Kerala
