= P. R. Madhavan Pillai =

Indian politician

P. R. Madhavan Pillai (6 March 1917 – 25 September 1976) was an Indian politician and leader of Communist Party of India. He represented Kunnathoor constituency in 1st Kerala Legislative Assembly and Konni constituency in 3rd Kerala Legislative Assembly. He was a member of the Thirukochi Legislative Assembly from 1953-55.

Madhavan Pillai started his political career as a Congress activist in 1938. He was a member of the Travancore Congress Committee until 1948 and in the same year he joined the Communist Party. He was also a member of the State Committee, Member of the All India Kisan Sabha, Member of the Central Kisan Council, President and Vice President of the Kerala Karshaka Sangham. Madhavan Pillai was the editor of the communist publications Keralam and Navalokam and was the editor-in-chief of the Congress publication Yuva Kerala until 1948.
