= Koduvila =

- village
- Location in Kerala, India Koduvila (India)
- Coordinates: 8°59′0″N 76°37′0″E
- Country: India
- State: Kerala
- District: Kollam

Languages
  - Official: Malayalam, English
- Time zone: UTC+5:30 (IST)
- PIN: 691502
- Telephone code: 0474
- Vehicle registration: KL-02
- Coastline: 0 kilometres (0 mi)
- Nearest city: Kollam
- Lok Sabha constituency: Kollam
- Climate: Tropical monsoon (Köppen)
- Avg. summer temperature: 35 °C (95 °F)
- Avg. winter temperature: 20 °C (68 °F)

Koduvila is a village near Ashtamudi Lake in East-Kallada, Kollam district, Kerala, India. It shares a boundary with Munroe Island, and is near Chittumala.

== Landmarks ==
Landmarks in Koduvila include St. Francis Xavier Church, which is one of the oldest Latin catholic churches in Kollam, St. Elias Church, St. Francis Upper Primary School, Koduvila, which was established in 1870, Rural School, Koduvila Post Office, Shiva temple (Kodiyattu junction), Upaharamatha Hospital and Idiyakkadavu bridge which connect it to Munroe Island.

== Tourism ==
Koduvila's primary tourist draw is the Ashtamudi Lake, which surrounds most parts of the village. The proximity of another tourist spot viz Munroe Island has contributed much to the development of this village. Tourism is still undeveloped due to a lack of infrastructure such as hotels and home stays. The nearest airport is the Thiruvananthapuram International Airport. The nearest railway station is at Kollam. There is also a small railway station in Munroe Island (4 km).
