= Sooranad Ravi =

Indian children's writer (1942–2020)

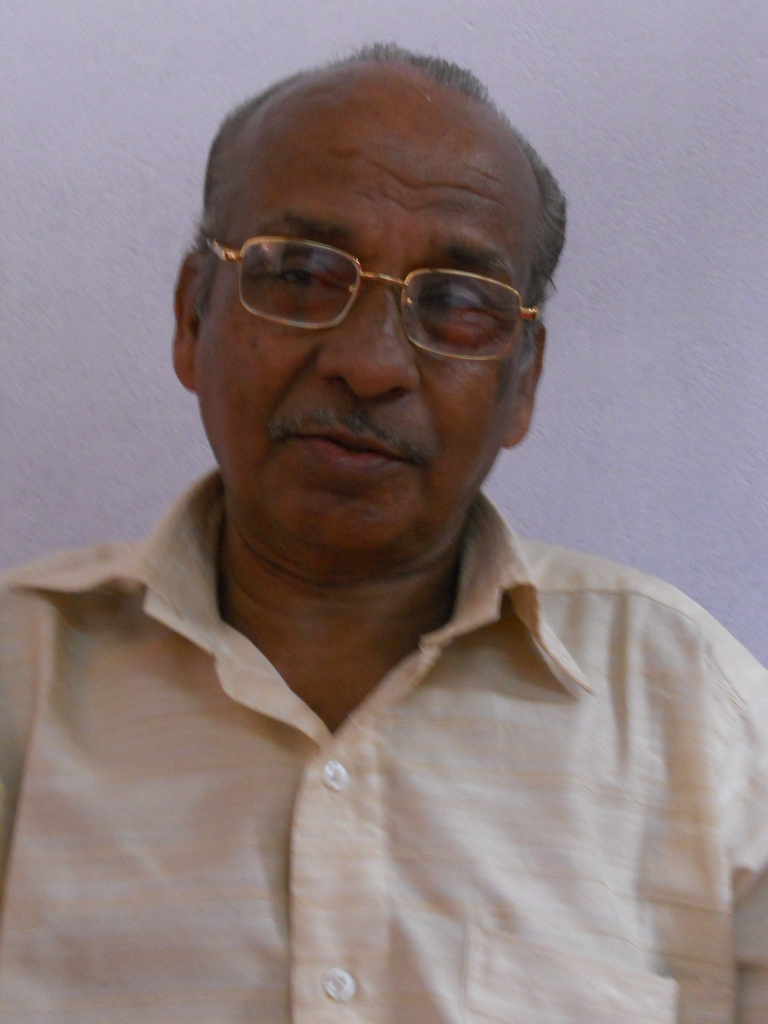
- Sooranad Ravi
- Born: Ravi; 7 February 1943; Travancore (present-day Sooranad, Kerala)
- Died: 24 October 2018 (aged 75)
- Occupation: Writer
- Spouse: Chembakutty Amma
- Children: 3
- Writing career
- Genre: Children's literature

Sooranad Ravi (1943 February 7 - 2018 October 24) is a Malayalam language children's literature writer and translator from Kerala, India. He has authored over a hundred works in Malayalam literature, including short stories, poems and translations.

== Biography ==
He was born on 7 February 1943, at Sooranad, Travancore to Ichakkattu Idayileveettil Paramupillai and Bhavaniamma. He was a teacher at Mannady High School and retired in 1998. He was a follower of Kerala renaissance leader Chattampi Swamikal. His works, which include short poems and stories for children, have been a regular feature in children's magazines.

== Works ==
=== Novels and Short story collections ===
- Ariyunda
- Onappanthu
- Kilippattukal
- Bhagyathilekkulla Vazhi (Meaning:The way to luck)
- Pongalpattu
- Aksharamuthu
- Kathakal kond Bhoomi chuttam (Meaning:Let's go around the world with stories)
- Sachthra buddha kathakal (Illustrated Buddhist stories)
- Kuttikalkkay 101 kathakal (101 stories for children)

=== Translations ===
- Ponnarinjal katha
- Sreebuddhan, Asiayute velicham (translation of Edwin Arnold's 'Light of Asia')
- Kshemendra's Bodhisathwapadannakalpatha
- Gandjijiyute dayari (Gandhi's diary)
- 101 Red Indian Nadodikkathakal (Translation of 101 Red Indian Folk Tales)
- Tamizh nadodikkathakal (Translation of Tamil folk tales)
- Indian nadodikkathakal (Translation of Indian folk tales)
- Telugukathakal (Translation of Telugu stories
- Tanjavoorile tharattuppattukal (Translation of ballads of Thanjavur)
- Thirupati Venkitesa kathakal (Translation of stories of Tirupati Venkatesh)
- Subala vajrathundam (Translation of Sanskrit play)
- Gandhijiyute andhya prabhashanangal (Translation of Gandhiji's Last Sermons)
- Oru Kadalora gramathinte katha
- Charukasera
- Translation of Sreemad Bhagavadgita by Kodungallur Kunjikkuttan Thampuran
- Translation of Thampuran Ramayanam by Kottarakkara Thampuran

== Awards and honors ==
- 1989: NCERT National Award for Children's literature for his work Ariyunda
- 2018: Kerala State Institute of Children's Literature Outstanding Contribution Award for his contributions in the field of children's literature

== Family ==
He and his wife Chembakutty Amma have 3 children Indusekhar, Srirekha and Sreelakshmi.
