= Chittumala =

Urban settlement in Kerala, India

Chittumala is an urban settlement in Kollam district that is located on the Kundara - Bharanikkavu stretch of National Highway 183 besides Kallada River. The name Chittumala came from an old lady name chitta.

Chittumala is the headquarters of Chittumala block panchayat which encompasses 13 Gram panchayats that form the southern shore of Ashtamudi Lake. It is also famous for the ancient Sri Durga Devi Temple and a lake named Chittumala Chira.

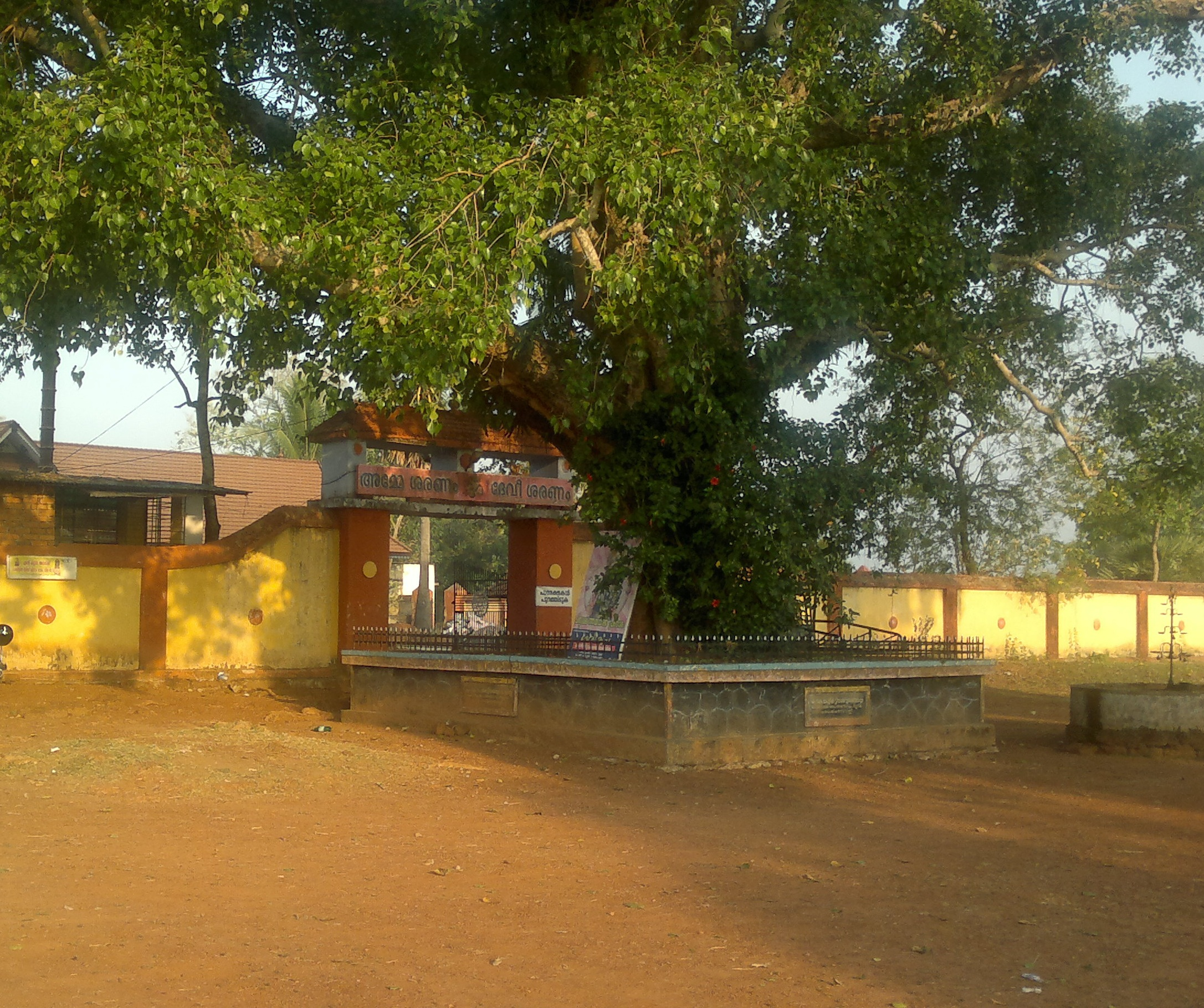
Shree Durga Devi Temple

== Location and connectivity ==
It is situated about 23 km from Kollam city, 9 km from Kundara and 8 km from Bharanikkavu. It is surrounded by three waterbodies namely Kallada River, Ashtamudi Lake and Chittumala Chira.

The major mode of transportation is Road transport. The village is connected with Kundara, Kollam, Karunagappalli, Chengannur etc. through private buses and Kerala State Road Transport Corporation buses. The nearby connectivity is Kundara Railway Station (9km) on Kollam–Sengottai Line.

The Kerala State Water Transport Department services are available from nearby Munroe Island.

The nearby airport is Trivandrum International Airport. (73 kms)

== Chittumala Block ==
Chittumala is one of the block panchayats in Kerala. It has received numerous awards and Swaraj trophy for best local self governing body several times
