= Rajesh Babu K Sooranad =

Indian Music director and film producer born 1976

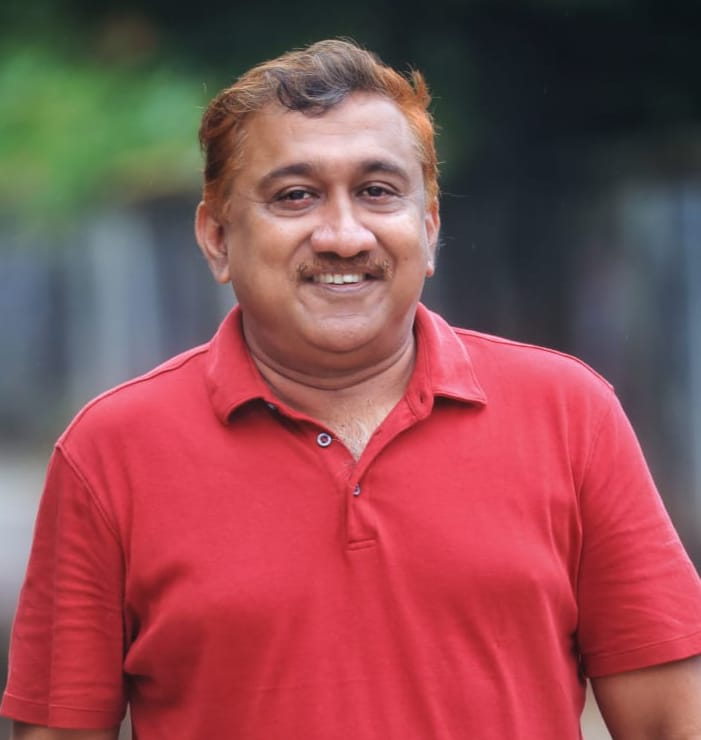
- Born: May 27, 1976 (age 50); Kollam, Kerala
- Occupations: Music director; Film producer; Screenwriter
- Years active: 2015–present

Rajesh Babu K Sooranad (born 27 May 1976) is an Indian music director, film producer, and screenwriter working in the Malayalam film industry.

== Filmography ==
Filmography
Year	Film
2016	Take It Easy
2017	Srihalli
2017	Mattanchery
2017	Ithirivettom
2018	" Vellaripravukal
2019	Oru Papadavada Premam
2019	Kakkapponnu
2019	Pullu
2020	Pranayamritham
2021	Anandakalyanam
2021	Perfume- Her Fragrance
2023	Binary
2023	Bell-um Brake-um
2023	Randam Mukham
2023	Meenakshi
2023	Blood Moon
