= JNP =

JNP may refer to:

- Janata Party, an Indian political party
- Japan New Party, a Japanese political party active between 1992 and 1994
- Jathika Nidahas Peramuna, a Sri Lankan political party
- Jigme Namgyel Polytechnic, one of the constituent colleges of the Royal University of Bhutan
- Jilib National Park, in Somalia
