= Kamukumchery =

- village
- Location in Kerala, India Kamukumchery (India)
- Coordinates: 9.055227°N 76.874517°E
- Country: India
- State: Kerala
- District: Kollam

Languages
  - Official: Malayalam, English
- Time zone: UTC+5:30 (IST)
- Telephone code: 0475
- Vehicle registration: KL-80
- Literacy: 100%

Kamukumchery is a village located in Pathanapuram in Kollam district of Kerala, India. The village belongs to the Piravanthoor and Thalavor panchayats. The Kallada River passes through the village. The main temple in Kamukumchery is Kamukumchery Thiruvilangonappan Temple. There are three schools which helped Kamukumchery to achieve 100% literacy: Government LPS Kamukumchery, Government New LPS Kamukumchery and UPS Kamukumchery.
