= Sasthamcotta Lake =

Lake in Kerala, India

Sasthamkotta Lake
- ശാസ്താംകോട്ട കായൽ (Malayalam)
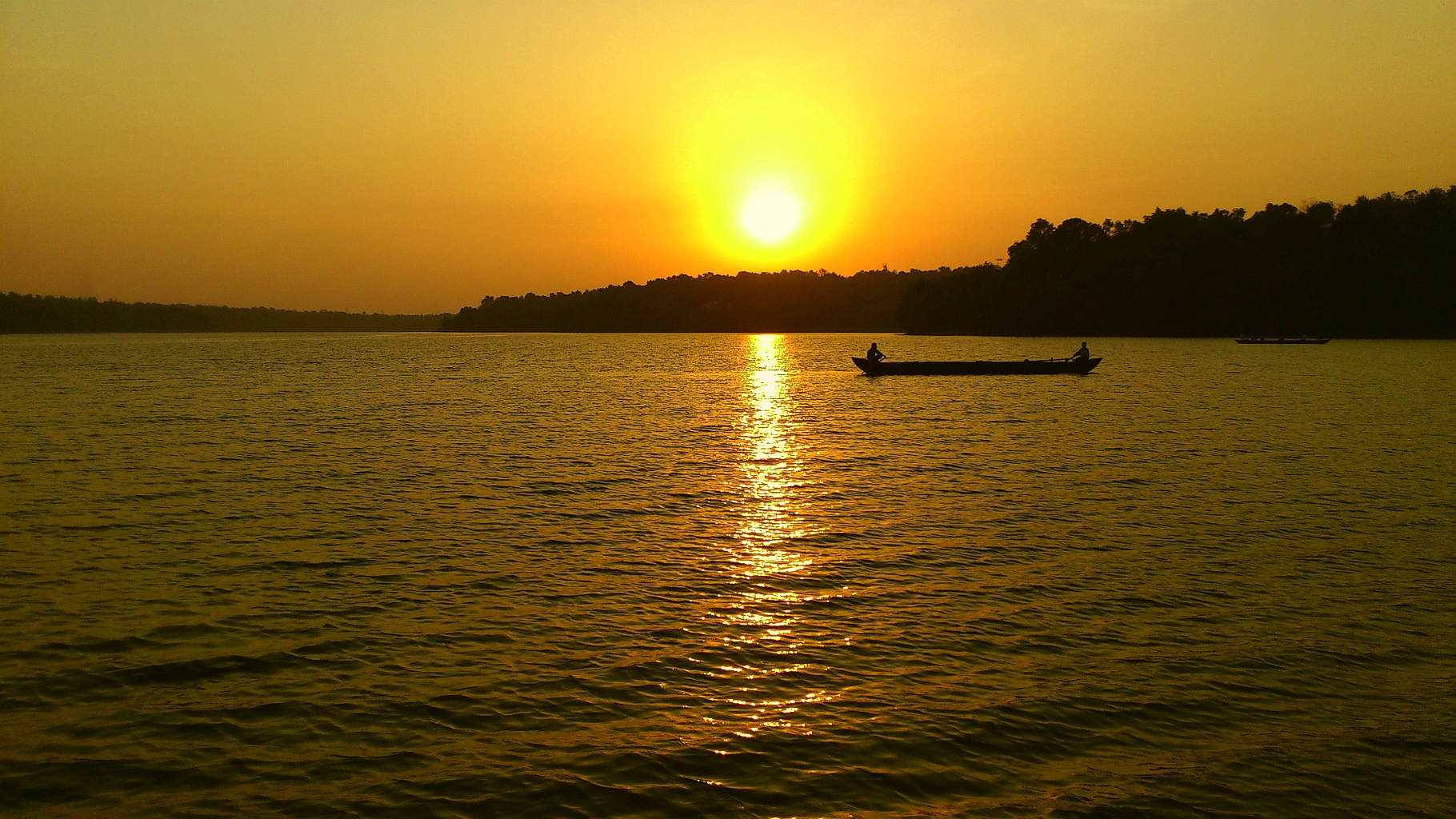
- Sasthamkotta Lake

- Location within Kerala
- Interactive map of Sasthamkotta Lake
- Location: Sasthamkotta, Kollam, Kerala
- Coordinates: 9°02′08.2″N 76°38′12.8″E
- Catchment area: 12.69 km^{2} (4.90 sq mi)
- Basin countries: India
- Surface area: 373 ha (920 acres)
- Average depth: 6.53 m (21.4 ft)
- Max. depth: 15.2 m (50 ft)
- Water volume: 22.4×10^{6} m^{3} (790×10^{6} cu ft)
- Surface elevation: 33 m (108 ft)
- Settlements: Karunagapally and Sasthamkotta

Ramsar Wetland
- Official name: Sasthamkotta Lake
- Designated: 19 August 2002
- Reference no.: 1212

Sasthamcotta Lake or Sasthamkotta Lake, also categorized as a wetland, is the largest fresh water lake in Kerala, a state of India on the south of the West Coast. The lake is named after the ancient Sastha temple (a pilgrimage centre) located on its bank. It meets the drinking water needs of half million people of the Quilon district and also provides fishing resources. The purity of the lake water for drinking use is attributed to the presence of large population of larva called cavaborus that consumes bacteria in the lake water. The lake is a designated wetland of international importance under the Ramsar Convention since November 2002.

== Access ==
The lake is located at a distance of 25 km from Quilon city, which is on the northern side of Ashtamudi Lake. Thiruvananthapuram International Airport, at 105 km, is the nearest airport to Kollam. Karunagapally, at a distance of 8 km, is the closest town to the lake. A ferry service across the lake transports people between West Kallada and Sasthamkotta.

== Topography and geology ==
Except for an earthen embankment of 1.5 km length which separates the lake from the paddy fields on its southern side, bordering the alluvial plains of the Kallada River, all other sides of the lake are surrounded by hills which are steep and form narrow valleys. In the south and southwestern parts of the lake there are a number of smaller water bodies and waterlogged areas. The present area of the lake is 375 ha since large part of the lake is reported to have been occupied for agriculture. Rock formation of mainly archaean origin are recorded with intrusions of charnockite, biotite gneiss and dolerite dyke rocks. The Tertiary Varkala formations are observed along the coastal beds. In the valley portion, sand and silt deposits are recorded. Geomorphological divisions of the basin area of the lake comprise a) the undulating uplands which have fairly thick vegetation of mixed crops and plantations, b) the valley fills of laterite alluvium and colluvial deposits with low level areas which are intensely cultivated and thickly populated and c) the flood plains/alluvial plains of the Kallada River on the south that are mostly cultivated.

== Hydrology ==
There are no visible tributaries feeding the lake but springs at the bottom of the lake are stated to be one of the source which supply water throughout the year; volume of water in the lake is estimated to be of the order of 22.4 million cum. A thick 10–20 m mantle of kaolinite rich (derivative of laterite) soil around the lake is stated to check flow into the lake and the theory is now that the lake is also rain fed; the lake water level is recorded to be higher at the end of the monsoon season. The average annual rainfall in the area is 2398 mm and mean annual temperature varies between 26.7 °C and 29.16 °C. Ground water table in the area is reported at depth of 3.89 m. After accounting for estimated evaporation loss of 5 MCM (million cubic metres) and water utilized for domestic use of 8 MCM (at a pumpage rate of 22 MLD), the two together account for about two-thirds of the inflow.

== Water quality ==
The lake water is reported to be free of common salt or other minerals and metals. The quality for surface water, interstitial water and sediments studied by World Wildlife Fund (WWF), India are briefly as noted below.

Quality for surface water (average values):

- Surface water: pH 7.25; EC 63.00 Millimhos/cm; PO_{4} – P 4.93 Micro gm. / l ; Ca 7.01Micro gm. / l; Na 4.33 Micro gm. / l; Fe 41.57 Micro gm. / l and Mn 12.11 Micro gm. / l.
- Interstitial water: pH 7.20; PO_{4} – P 1.11 Micro gm. / l; Fe 59.1Micro gm. / l and Mn49.00 Micro gm. / l
- Sediments: Organic C 8.95%; PO_{4} – P 1690.00 Micro gm. / l; Fe 17724.27 Micro gm. / l and Mn 86.36 Micro gm. /l

Water quality test results indicate that the lake water conforms to standards of drinking water prescribed by regulatory bodies.

== Flora ==
Eastern shore of the lake has the insectivorous plant Drosera Sp. Vegetation is negligible and rooted plants and floating plants are unimportant and insignificant. The crops grown on the banks of the lake, apart from paddy, are the plantation crops such as cashewnut, tapioca and plantain.

== Aqua fauna ==
The aqua fauna noted in the lake are:

- 27 species of freshwater fishes include pearl spot (Etroplus suratensis) and catfish, two genera of prawns, 21 species of herrings and sardines of the family Clupeidae
- Common fish such as Calichrous bimaculatus and Wallago attu These varieties of fish generally have whisker-like barbells set around their mouths.

The common teal or dabbling duck is the smallest migratory bird found in the lake.

Some of the vulnerable, endangered and critically endangered species reported by WWF in the lake area are:

- Critically endangered: Puntius ticto punctatus (Day)
- Endangered: Horabagrus brachysoma (Gunther)
- Vulnerable: Parambassis thomassi (Day)

== Fauna ==
Resident troops of monkeys are sighted on the banks in large numbers, which are part of the Sasthamkotta temple environment on the bank of the lake. 13 species of insects have also been identified; 9 are butterflies, 2 odonates and 2 hymenopterans.

== Deterioration in lake environment ==
The quality of the lake environment is affected by the following factors.

- Increasing anthropogenic pressure
- Encroachment on parts of the lake for agriculture
- Cultivation of tapioca has increased the soil loss by erosion and runoff into the lake basin
- Domestic and agrochemical wastes from surrounding areas disposed into the lake
- Soil erosion of the banks from the encroached land
- Effluents from domestic sewage
- Reduction of ground water recharge to the lake due to increase in agriculture in the area around the lake.
- Soaking of dry leaves of coconut palm before matting, which are then used for thatching huts

== Conservation and management ==
The Kerala State Government prepared a Conservation and Management Action Plan (MAP) in 1999 for the lake's sustainable utilization and conservation and to address the threats faced by the lake. Financial support was sought from the Central Government under the National Lake Conservation Plan (NLCP) for implementation of MAP based on the specific problems identified in the wetland.

The MAP envisages the following activities:

- Agro-forestry in the catchment,
- sanitation and drainage,
- pollution abatement,
- limited desilting,
- weed control,
- conservation of flora and fauna,
- fishery development, and
- awareness campaigns among the local inhabitants.

The above activities were planned to be implemented through the Kerala Water Authority (KWA), Department of Forests and Wild Life, Department of Fisheries, State Fisheries Resource Management Society (FIRMA), District Rural Development Agency (DRDA), CWRDM, etc. Kerala State Council for Science Technology and Environment of Govt. of Kerala provided the support and overall supervision.

== Gallery ==
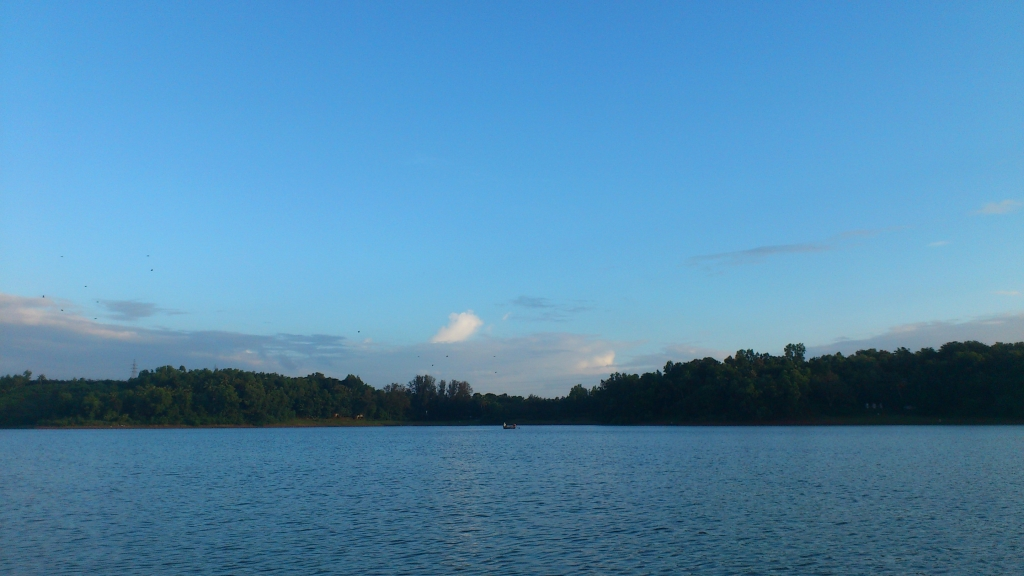
Sasthamkotta Lake

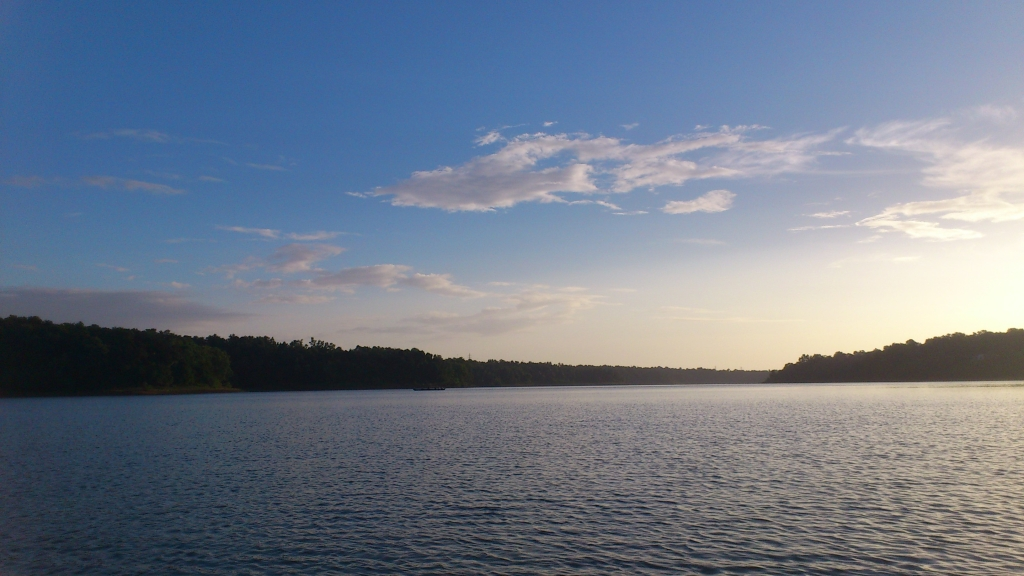
Sasthamkotta Lake

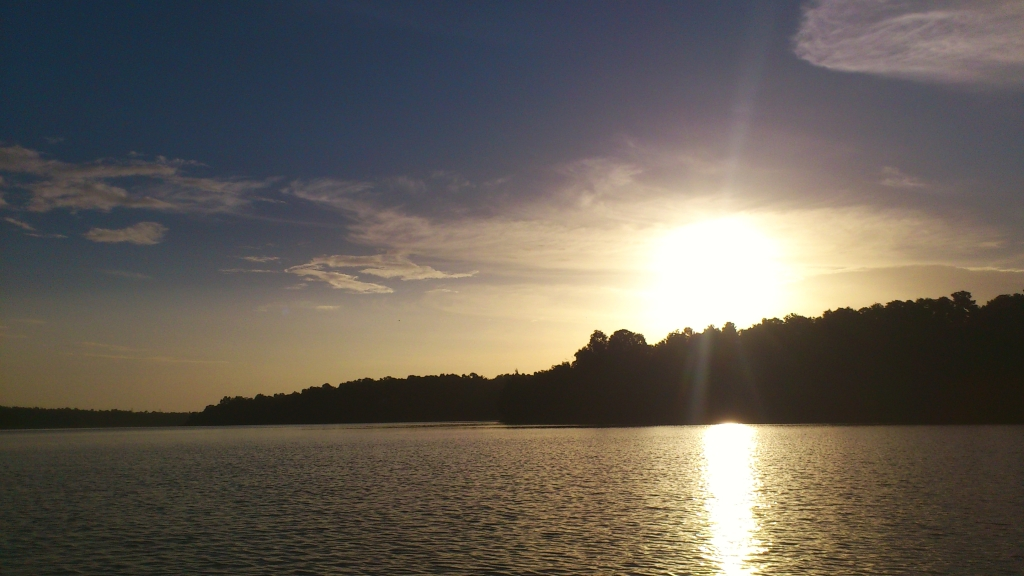
An Evening view of Sasthamkotta Lake

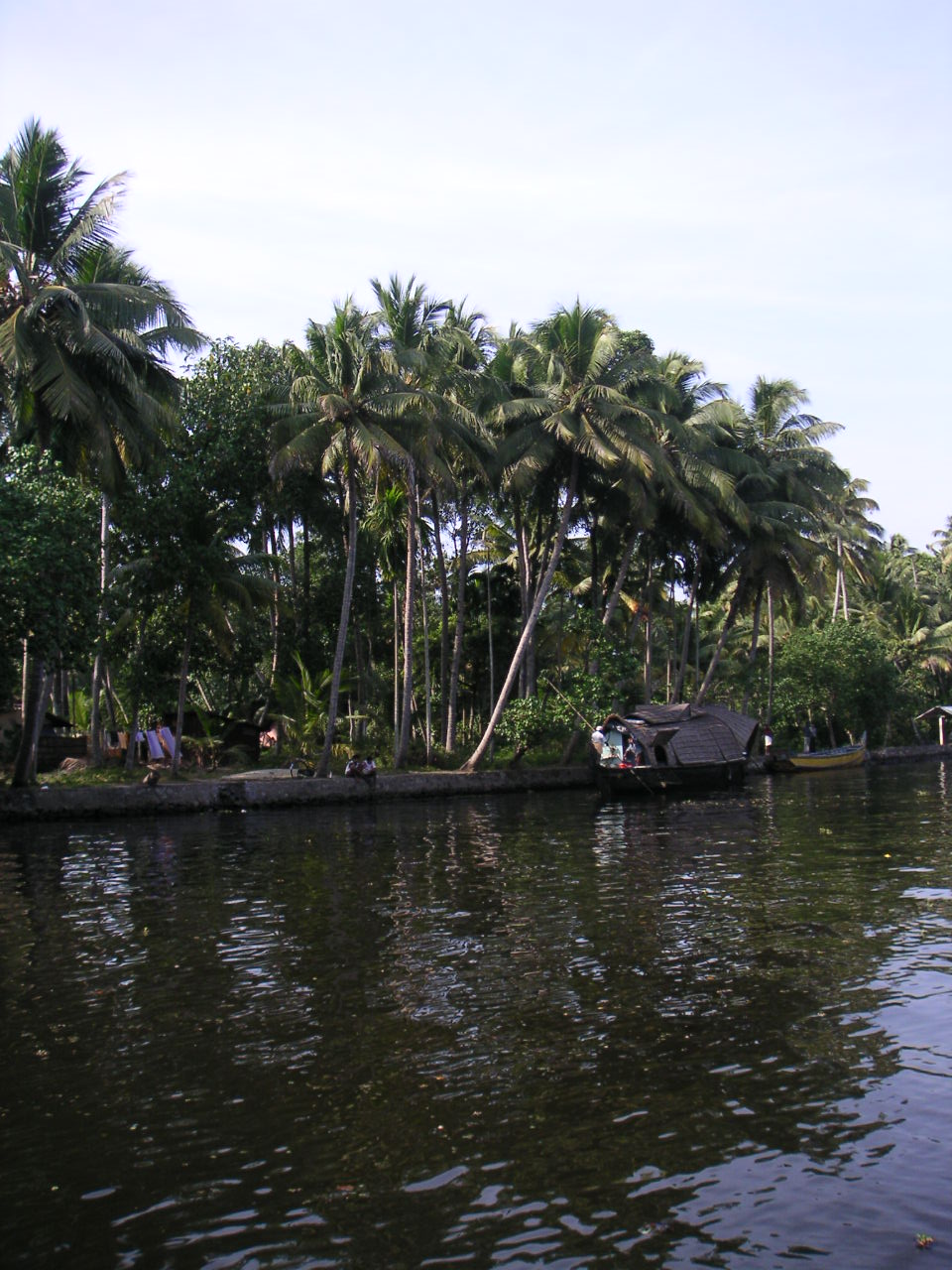
Village on bank of the lake

== See also ==
- Kollam
- Kallada River
- Munroethuruth
