= Ayiranalloor =

- village
- Location in Kerala, India Ayiranalloor (India)
- Coordinates: 8°59′0″N 76°58′0″E
- Country: India
- State: Kerala
- District: Kollam

Population (2011)
  - Total: 13,289

Languages
  - Official: Malayalam, English
- Time zone: UTC+5:30 (IST)
- Postal code: 691307
- Vehicle registration: KL-25

Ayiranalloor is a village in Kollam district in the state of Kerala, India.

== Demographics ==
As of 2011 India census, Ayiranalloor had a population of 13289 with 6244 males and 7045 females.
