= Mynagappally =

- village
- Mynagappally Lake
- Interactive map of Mynagappally
- Coordinates: 9°2′30″N 76°35′0″E
- Country: India
- State: Kerala
- District: Kollam

Population (2011)
  - Total: 41,027

Languages
  - Official: Malayalam, English
- Time zone: UTC+5:30 (IST)
- PIN: 690519
- Telephone code: 476
- Vehicle registration: KL-61
- Nearest city: Karunagappally
- Lok Sabha constituency: Mavelikkara
- Vidhan Sabha constituency: Kunnathur
- Climate: Moderate (Köppen)
- Website: www.mynagappally.in

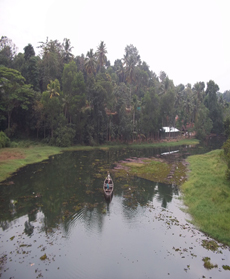
Mynagappally River

Mynagappally is a village in Kollam district in the Indian state of Kerala.

== Description ==
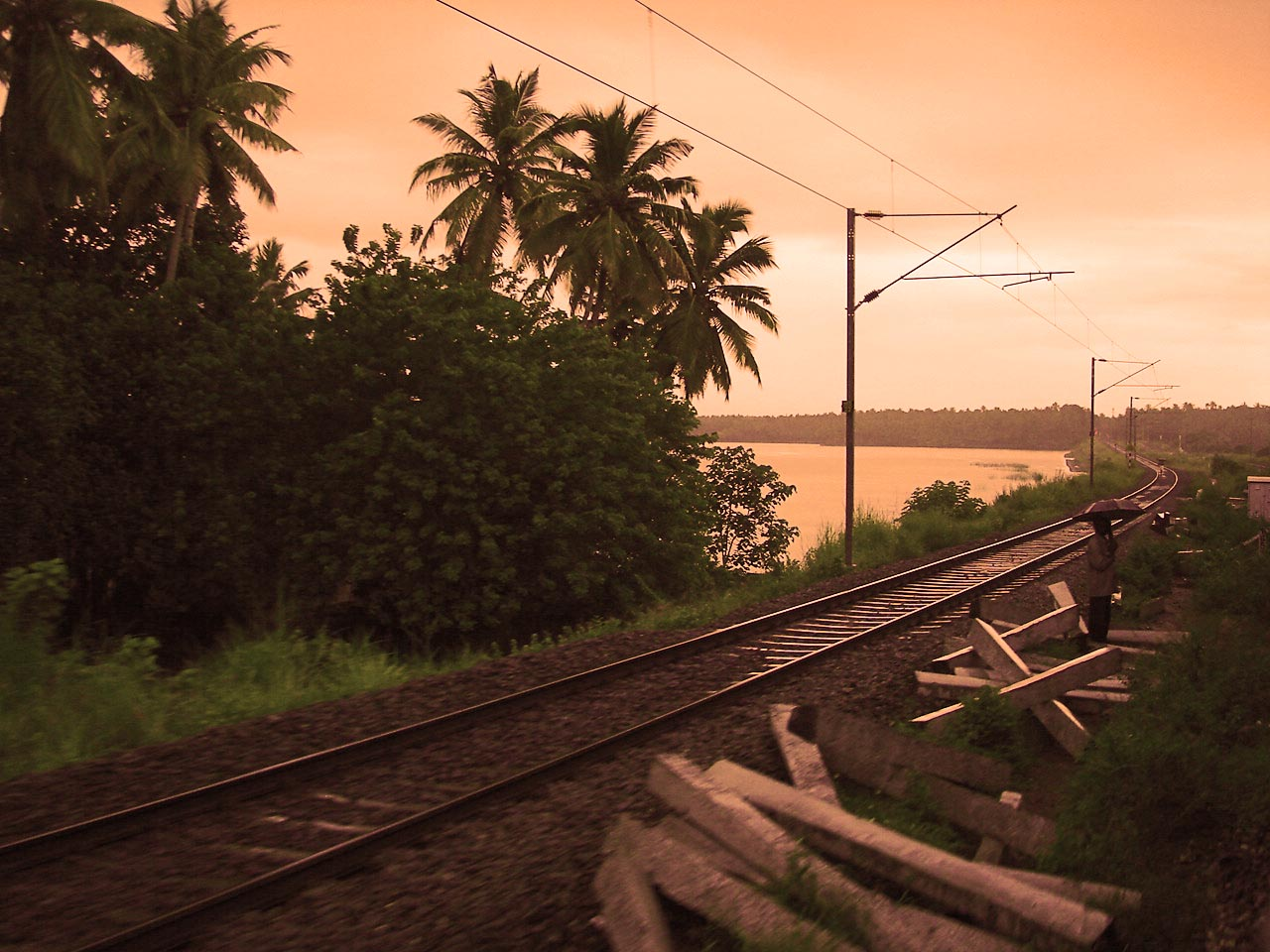
View of Kallukadavu Kayal from the railway line

As of 2011 India census, Mynagappally had a population of 41027 with 19494 males and 21533 females.

Mynagappally is located in Kunnathoor Taluk. Its location is 7 km east of Karunagappally and 6 km west of Sasthamcotta.

== Transport ==
Sasthamcotta railway station is in this village.

Its western border is separated by Pallikkal River from Thodiyoor panchayath. Mynagappally panchayat shares its southern border with Thevalakkara Panchayat, its North side with Sooranad panchayat and east side with Sasthamcotta panchayat.Bus facilities are also available here. The road joining Karunagappally and kottarakkara pass through Mynagappally.

== Economy ==
This panchayat hosts industrial activity including seven cashew factories, brick manufacturing, tile manufacturing, coir industry and matchbox industry. Four main market places service this village.

== Religion ==
"Mannoorkkavu Devi temple", where Kathakali played most often, is there. "Vettikkadu Siva Temple" are situated there."Kumarenchira Devi Temple " is also an important pilgrim place situated here.

== Education ==
High Schools in Mynagappally include:

- LVHS Mynagappally
- MSHSS Mynagappally
- Boys HS Thevalakkara

OLDEST SCHOOLS SCVLPS South Mynagappally SCVUPS South Mynagappally
