= West Kallada =

West Kallada Padinjare Kallada
- village
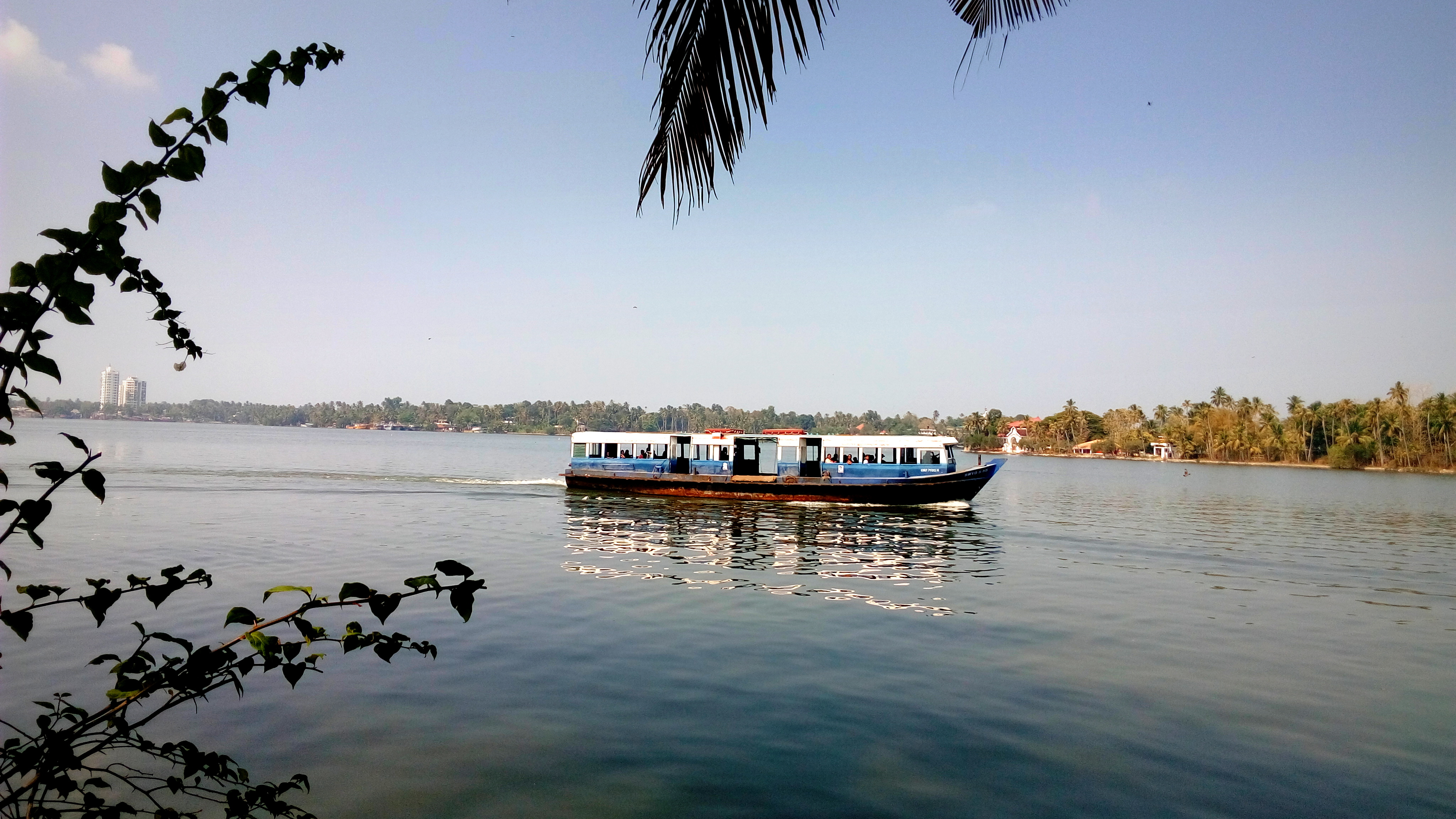
- West Kallada has regular ferries to Kollam
- Interactive map of West Kallada
- Coordinates: 9.0077577°N 76.6235876°E
- Country: India
- State: Kerala
- District: Kollam

Population (2011)
  - Total: 18,176

Languages
  - Official: Malayalam, English
- Time zone: UTC+5:30 (IST)
- PIN: 691500
- Telephone code: 0476
- Vehicle registration: KL-61
- Nearest city: Kollam
- Lok Sabha constituency: Mavelikkara
- Vidhan Sabha constituency: Kunnathoor
- Climate: Tropic (Köppen)

West Kallada is a village in Kollam district in the state of Kerala, India.

== Demographics ==
As of 2011 India census, West Kallada had a population of 18,176 with 8,693 males and 9,483 females.

== Kallada Valiyapally ==
St. Mary's Orthodox Syrian Church at West Kallada is one of the most important pilgrimage centres in the Malankara Church. The Church has a history dating from AD 9th century.

== Thiruvatta Temple ==
Thiruvatta Temple (Malayalam: തിരുവാറ്റ ശ്രീ മഹാദേവർ ക്ഷേത്രം ) is an ancient Hindu temple dedicated to Shiva at Westkallada

== Educational guidelines ==
- Govt. HSS, West Kallada.
- Government UPS, Valiyapadam
- Govt. L. P. School, Kothapuram.
- Govt. L. P. School, Kanatharkunnam.

== Hospitals ==
- Govt Ayurvedic Hospital, West Kallada
- Govt Veterinary Hospital, West Kallada
- Primary Health Center, Aithottuva, West Kallada
- Primary Health Center, Koikkalbhagom, West Kallada

== Main cultural institutions ==
- Sri Kumbalath Sankupilla Smaraka Grandhasala, Karali junction
- Abhiraj Grandhasala, Kanatharkunnam
- V.K.S. Grandhasala Aithottuva.
- Chintha Grandhasala Ulluruppu
- Nalandha Library, Thottathilkadav
- Navodaya Grandhasala, Kadapuzha
- E.M.S. Grandhasala, Valiayapadam west, Vilanthara.
- Gramam. Grandhasala, Valiayapadam, Vilanthara.
- C.K. Thankappan Smaraka Grandhasala, Aithottuva.
- P.K. Raghvan Smaraka Grandhasala, Aithottuva.
- Kadisseril Achyuthan Pilla Smaraka Grandhasala, Aithottuva
- Priyadarsini Grandhasala, Aithottuva
- T.P. Sadanandan Smaraka Grandhasala, Aithottuva.
- Mathrubhumi Study Circle ( Mathrubhumi Arts and sports club), Aithottuva.

== Government service centers ==
- Akshaya- E- Center
- St Antonys Building, Karali Junction
- Jana Seva Kendra, thengumthara junction, Aithottuva
- Common Service Centre Kadapuzha.

== Festivals ==
- Kallada Jalotsavam (കല്ലട ജലോത്സവം) - Vallam Kali (boat race) held on the Kallada River

Thaipooya kavadi at kodumthuruthil tempkle

- kanakkathara bhadrakali temple ulsavam
- kavadi, soolamkuth kodumthuruthil subrahmanya kshethram
- Thalayinakaav Temple ( Thrisoola pooja in every Saturday).
- Parambil umamaheswara Temple (uthram thirunaal mahotsav)
- Moolathara Nagakovil Temple ( Kumbha-thiruvathira mahotsav)

== Popular Games ==
- Kabaddi
- Gulan Perish ( Twenty-eight (card game) )
- Cricket
- Football
- Volleyball
- kilithattu kali(traditional willage game)
