= Kallada =

Village in Kollam District, Kerala, India

Kallada is a village in Kollam district of the Indian state of Kerala. Maharaja Marthanda Varma of the kingdom of Travancore was born there. The Kallada River passes through there and the famous Chittumala Sree Durga Devi temple is situated there, Kallada Valiya Pally is also situated there.

== See also ==
- Kizhakkekallada
