= Revolutionary Socialist Party (Leninist) =

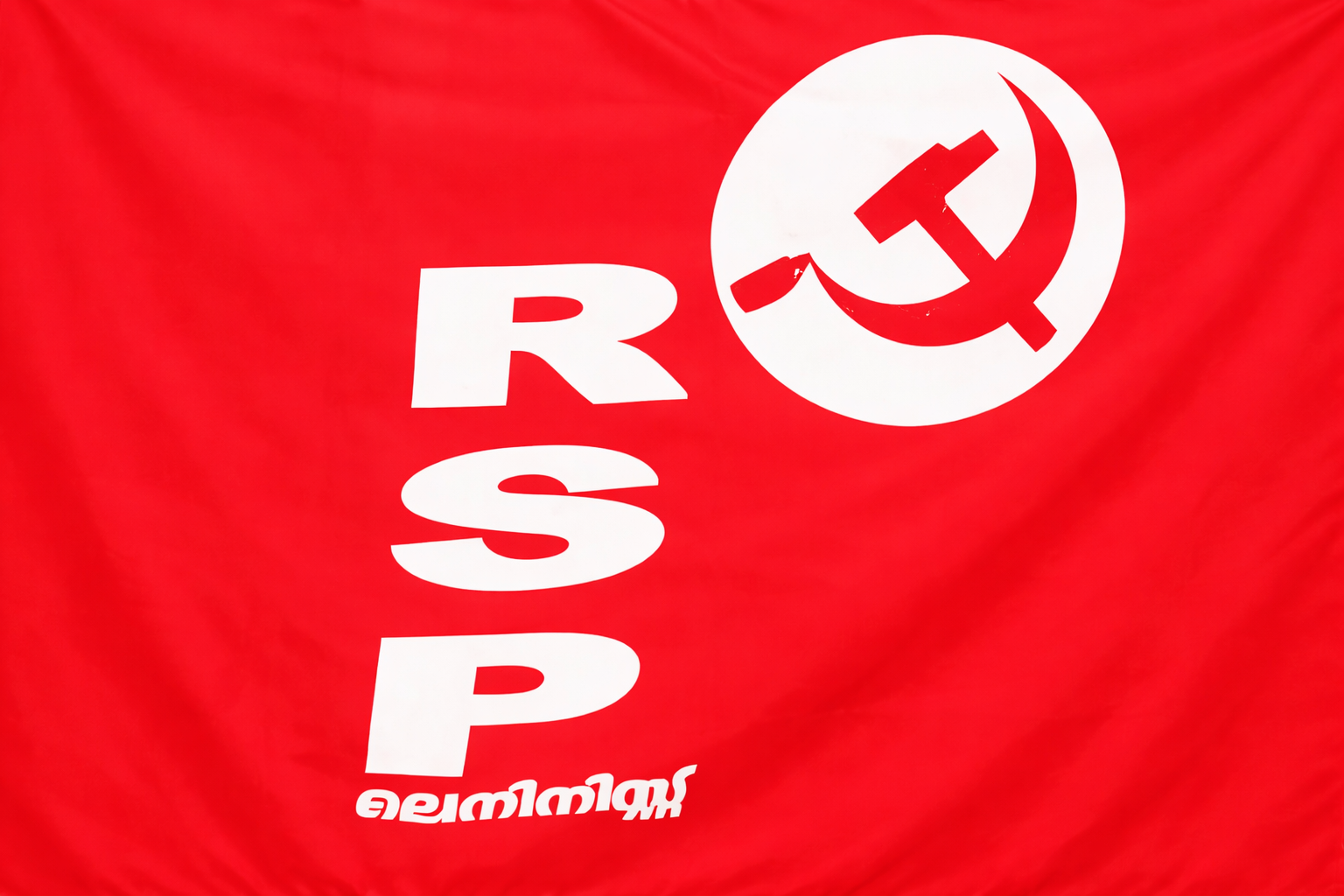
- Abbreviation: RSP(L)
- Leader: Kovoor Kunjumon
- Secretary: Shaji Philip
- Founder: Ambalathara Sreedharan Nair
- Founded: 2016 (10 years ago)
- Split from: Revolutionary Socialist Party
- Ideology: Communism; Marxism–Leninism; Revolutionary socialism
- Political position: Left-wing
- Colours: Red
- Alliance: Left Democratic Front (LDF)
- Seats in Kerala Legislative Assembly: 0 / 140
- Number of states and union territories in government: 0 / 31

The Revolutionary Socialist Party (Leninist) abbreviated as RSP(L) is a communist political party in India. The party was formed in 2016 following a split from the Revolutionary Socialist Party under the leadership of Kovoor Kunjumon.

== Electoral performance ==
Electoral performance of RSP(L)
Year	Candidate	Constituency	Result
2016	Kovoor Kunjumon	Kunnathoor	Won
2021	Kovoor Kunjumon	Kunnathoor	Won
2026	Kovoor Kunjumon	Kunnathoor	Lost

== See also ==
- Communism in Kerala
- Communism in India
- Revolutionary Socialist Party
- Kerala Revolutionary Socialist Party (Baby John)
- Revolutionary Socialist Party of India (Marxist)
