= Poruvazhy Peruviruthy Malanada Temple =

- Peruviruthy Malanada Temple, Poruvazhi, Kollam, Kerala

Religion
- Affiliation: Hinduism
- District: Kollam
- Deity: Mala Appooppan
- Festivals: Malakkuda Maholsavam, Pallipaana
- Governing body: Poruvazhy Peruviruthy Malanada Devaswom

Location
- Location: Poruvazhy
- State: Kerala
- Country: India
- Interactive map of Poruvazhy Peruviruthy Malanada Temple
- Coordinates: 9°06′08.8″N 76°39′28.4″E

Architecture
- Type: Kerala Traditional
- Creator: Poruvazhy Peruviruthy Malanada Devaswom

Specifications
- Temple: One
- Elevation: 47.56 m (156 ft)

Website
- https://malanada.com

Poruvazhy Peruviruthy Malanada, popularly known as Peruviruthy Malanada or Malanada is a Mala Appooppan shrine in South India. (It is believed that the 'Sankalpa Moorthy' at Malanada is 'Duryodhanan'). It is located at Edakkad Ward (Kara) of Poruvazhy village in Kunnathoor Taluk of Kollam district (Kerala State), India. This place is the northern border of Kollam district which Pathanamthitta and Alappuzha districts share the boundaries. The temple is located equidistant from Adoor (M C Road) to the Northeast and Sasthamcottah to the Southeast. It is also reachable from Kayamkulam and Karunagappally on the NH 47 and Kottarakkara (via Puthoor or Enathu) on the MC road (approximately 25 km from each centre).

== History ==
Malanada - There is a Temple (Nada) on the Hill (Mala). Unlike other temples, there is no deity, nor a ‘Sreekovil’ as such in Malanada. Down the hill on the south and west we see vast low lying paddy fields and on the east and north inhabited agricultural land. In place of Sreekovil and deity we could see only a raised platform called ‘Althara’ or ‘Mandapam’. In the absence of an idol, devotees submit themselves to a divine power (of their imagination/understanding) through a mental process of ‘Sankalpam’.

It is believed that the ‘Sankalpa Moorthy ‘at Malanada is ‘Duryodhanan’, the Great Epic character of Mahabharatham. The concept is unique in Indian history in as much as ‘Duryodhanan’, the Kaurava King known for his ‘Thamoguna’ driven thoughts and actions, being adored as the principal deity in a temple. Enduring beliefs assimilate into personal value system. The myth unravels: as part of his efforts to trace out the ‘Pandavas’ in exile, Duryodhanan traversed the forests in the Malanada hill. By that time he was much tired and went to a nearby house on the north west of Malanada and asked for drinking water. It was Thazhethil Kaduthamsserry Kottaram, where Malanada Appoppan, the priest and ruler of the land was staying. An elderly woman gave him toddy which was customary at that time as a mark of respect. The king enjoyed the drink, but realized after seeing the ‘Kurathali’ worn by the woman that she belonged ‘Kurava’ clan. The king appreciated the divinity of the place and its people who possessed supernatural powers (Siddha). Thereafter, in furtherance of his ‘Rajadharma’, the king sat on the hill and worshipped Lord Siva, praying for the welfare of his people (the prajas). As an act of charity he gave away hundreds of acres of agricultural land and paddy fields as freehold to the ‘Devasthanam’. Even now the land tax of the above property is being levied in the name of ‘Duryodhanan’.

The king also ensured that Gandhari, the Royal Mother, Dussala, his sister, Karnan, his close associate and Karna, Dronar, his ‘Guru’ and the other members of his family were properly and adequately aboded and worshipped in the nearby places and members of the ‘Kurava’ caste are poojaris in all such places.

The temple administration at Malanada is vested in a committee elected by members of 7 ‘Karas’, supposed having Malanada Appoopan’s territorial jurisdiction. Kunnathoor Taluk N S S Union and S N D P Union have their representatives in the committee by having 2 members each. ‘Kaduthamsserry Kudumbayogam among Kurava caste and ‘Kettungal Kudumabayogam’ among Ezhava caste enjoying special status in the administration of the temple.

== Malakkuda Festival ==
The annual festival at Malanada is known as ‘Malakkuda’(Mala means hill – the temple and Kuda, umbrella – an ornamental one used by Oorali, the priest, during ceremonial occasions.). It is celebrated during the summer, during the second half of March every year - an interval, when the terrestrial agricultural activities are over and before starting paddy cultivation in the wet land (paddy fields). The second Friday of the Malayalam month ‘Meenam’ is reckoned for celebrating ‘Malakkuda’( Meenam starts in the middle of March and ends in the middle of April) with toddy. The arrival of the festival is proclaimed by ‘Kodiyettu’ (the temple flag hoisting ceremony by Oorali after due observance) on the first Friday of Meenam. Presently, although there is festivity for 8 days from Kodiyettu to Malakkuda, there is no change in the rituals connected therewith.

On the festival day afternoon Oorali accompanied by his aids visits ‘Gurukkalssery Bhagavathy Temple’ and invites Devi to Malanada. Bhagavathy arrives Malanada in a procession and occupies her reserved seat (Mandapam in front of Malanada Temple). Thereafter Oorali goes to his abode at Kaduthamsserry Kottaram and gets ready with ‘Kachakettu’(wearing his priestly attire) with the help of his aidis, viz. ‘Thalikkaran’, ‘Kalassakkaran’ and ‘Naluveedar’. The team led by Oorali first worships at Malanada and thereafter proceed to ‘Muravukandam’ via ‘Adaipad’ to witness and bless the most spectacular and colourful event of the day known as the ‘Kettukazhcha’.

Kettukazhcha is a pageantry. It is the most splendid part of the Maha Malakkuda Maholsavam. It involves a spectacular display of craftsmanship in the form of ‘Edupu kala’ and ‘Edupu kuthira’. The orderly display of hundreds of such pieces, big and small, either as offering by believers for favours received or to be received or as customary by the 7 ‘Karakal’ (7 divisions of Malanada Appooppan’s territorial jurisdiction) in the vast stretch of the dry paddy fields surrounded by thousands of spectators viewing from far and near in the descending sun, renders a panoramic view. This is the essence of the festival. Oorali after having an overall view of the scene from his designated spot, visits and blesses each and every such display item. By around sunset the ‘Kettukazhcha’ one by one moves up the Malanada hill, rounds the temple 3 times and thereafter returns or parks on the hill for the night. There will be cultural programmes during night. "Kathakali" based on the story ‘Nizhalkuthu’ is customary.

Next Malakkuda Festival is on 28-Mar-2025

== Malanada Thookkam ==
It is one of the most popular traditions followed in Malanada. The right to do the thookkam iis reserved for Gurukkalsserial family. At present, the thukam is done by gurukkalsseril family.

== Swarna Kodi ==
Poruvazhy Peruviruthy Malanada Devaswom very proudly keeps under lock & key a Gold Flag(Swarnakkodi). It is the status symbol of Malanada Appooppan, the symbol of power and authority. It is the privilege of the Mannan – The Ruler, The King to own such a flag! Made in pure gold, it is a precious show piece of excellent workmanship.

Public ‘Darshan’ of Swarnakkodi is permitted only on auspicious days like ‘Kodiyettu Day’, ‘Malakkuda Maholsavam Day’, etc. It is believed that the ‘Darshan’ of the Swarnakkodi brings home goodness and prosperity.

== Pallipaana ==
It is believed that Lord Mahavishnu with the help of Lord Subramanian found that he was afflicted by ‘Asura Dosha’. People belonging to ‘Velan’ community are the right ones to perform the corrective rituals to get rid of the ‘Dosha’ which was inflicted by practicing witchcraft against the Lord. ‘Velan’ community could not be found anywhere in the three worlds. At last Shri Parameswaran, who knows everything, appeared as ‘Velan’, Shri Parvathy as ‘Velathy’, Shri Mahaganapathy and Shri Subramanian as ‘Bhoothaganangal’. They came over to Palazhy and performed the ‘Mahakarma’ which is known as ‘Pallippana’ and relieved Bhagavan of his evil afflictions. It was the first ‘Pallippana’ ever heard in the history of mankind.

‘Pallippana’ is thus believed as a ritual capable of eliminating the evil spirits afflicting a deity and its land and people. At Malanada this ritual is performed without fail once in 12 years. It is believed that this observance elates the divine power of ‘Malanada Appooppan’ and makes the people of the seven ‘Karas’ rich and prosperous.

About 50 members of the ‘Velan’ Community as performers and an equal number of "Purangadi’ community members as antiperformers take part in this function. It lasts for 11 days to complete 18 ‘Mahathkarmangal’. The conduct of the function is very costly. The main ‘Karmas’ performed are Kappukettu, Idupanabali, Kuzhibali, Pattadabali, Ninabali, Panchabhoothabali, Aazhibali, Kidangubali, Marukubali, Peed’abali, Dikbali, and Koombubali.

Last Pallipaana Date: 24-Feb-2023 to 07-Mar-2023.

Next Pallipaana is on year 2035.

== See also ==
- List of Hindu temples in Kerala
