= Poruvazhy =

Poruvazhy Poruvizhy
- village
- Location in Kerala, India Poruvazhy (India)
- Coordinates: 9°4′0″N 76°38′0″E
- Country: India
- State: Kerala
- District: Kollam

Population (2011)
  - Total: 28,722

Languages
  - Official: Malayalam, English
- Time zone: UTC+5:30 (IST)
- PIN: 690520
- Telephone code: 0476
- Vehicle registration: KL-02, KL-23, KL-61
- Nearest city: Chakkuvally, Bharanicavu
- Lok Sabha constituency: Mavelikkara
- Vidhan Sabha constituency: Kunnathoor

Poruvazhy is a village in Kollam district in the state of Kerala, India. The Poruvazhy Peruviruthy Malanada Temple is in the village.

== Demographics ==
As of 2011 India census, Poruvazhy had a population of 28,722 with 13,669 males and 15053 females.
