= Kallada River =

River in South Kerala, India

Coordinates: 8°59′N 76°38′E

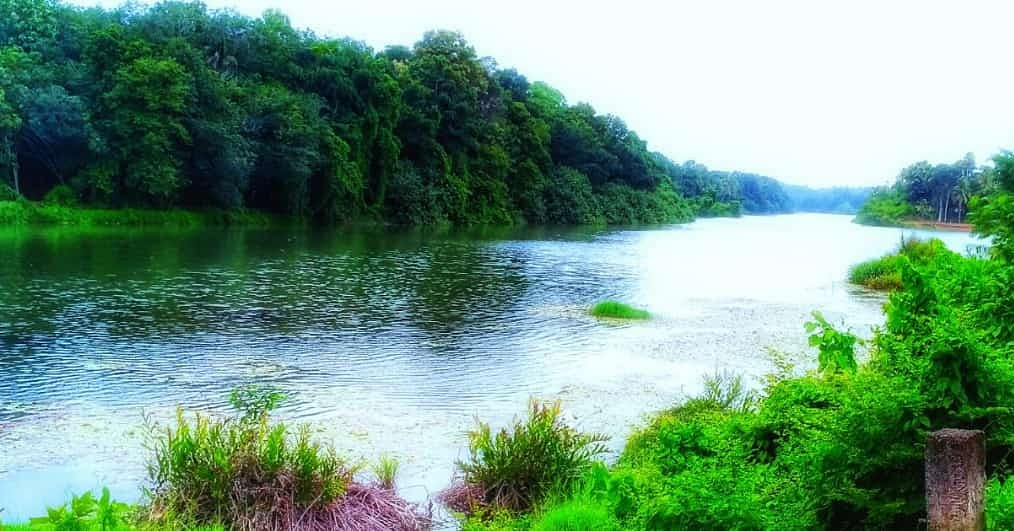
Kallada River/Kulathupuzha

The Kallada River is the longest river in Kollam District in Kerala, India. The river originates in Madathara in the Western Ghats and flows west reaching the Ashtamudi Lake, where it drains after traveling a distance of 120 km (75 mi).

== River Course ==
The Kallada originates from the southeastern part of the Kollam district as multiple streams arising from the Shendurney wildlife sanctuary. The most prominent among these streams are the Kazhuthuruttiyaaru, which arises from Rosemala and Ambanad Hills and flows southward, the Kulathupuzha river that flows northward from near the Ponmudi hills and the windward side of Agasthyamala Biosphere Reserve, and west-flowing streams that arise from the windward side of the Courtallam Hills. These major streams that form the river meet at Thenmala Dam.

The river flows through the towns of Kulathupuzha, Thenmala, Ottackal, Ayiranalloor, Edamon, Punalur, Nedumkayam, Kamukumchery and Pathanapuram. It then enters the plains where it flows alongside Pattazhy, Enathu, Mannadi, Kunnathur, Iverkala Puthoor, Pavithreswaram, East Kallada, Munroe Island and West Kallada. The river's estuary is situated near West Kallada, where it empties into Ashthamudi lake and thence into the Arabian Sea.

At Punalur, the Punalur Suspension Bridge was constructed in 1877 across the river by the Travancore Kingdom in the British Style. Kallada Boat Race (Kallada Jalotsavam) is one of the most famous boat races held in the state. The boat race is an annual event which takes place at the 28th day after Onam. It is held on the "Muthira Parambu - Karuvathra Kadavu" in the course of the river. Sasthamcotta Lake is the largest fresh water lake in Kerala and provides drinking water for most regions in the Kollam district. Except for an earthen embankment that is 1.5 km (0.93 mi) in length which separates the lake from the paddy fields on its southern side, bordering the alluvial plains of the Kallada River, all other sides of the lake are surrounded by steep hills.

== Industries along the river ==
There were many industries flourishing on the banks of the Kallada during the British Period. Punalur Paper Mills, established in 1875, is one such major company. The effluents discharged from the mill into the river were found to alter the physiochemical factors leading to production of plankton in the mid-1900s. The mill was embroiled in a labour dispute, and was closed in 1987. It was reopened in 2015, after legal resolutions.

Sand mining along the banks of the river is a cause of concern, because it makes them more vulnerable to erosion and floods.

== Kallada Irrigation Project ==
Kallada Irrigation project (KIP) is the largest irrigation project in Kerala. The command area of this project is distributed over Kollam, Pathanamthitta district and Alappuzha districts and covers Punalur, Pathanapuram, Kottarakkara, Kollam, Kunnathur, Karunagappally, Adoor, Mavelikkara and Karthikappally Taluks of Kerala.

The project was planned to irrigate a net cultivable command area of 61,630 ha (152,300 acres). During the course of execution some canals including the Kayamkulam Branch canal were dropped, and now this project is benefiting a net cultivable area of only 53,514 ha (132,240 acres) in 92 villages. Head work was completed during 1986. Now fully operational, the right bank main canal was partially commissioned during 1986 and the left bank main canal during 1992.

The Left Bank Main canal is 56.016 km (34.807 mi) in length and the Right Bank Main canal is 69.752 km (43.342 mi) in length. The Branch Canal of the left bank canal is 61.692 km (38.334 mi) long and that of the Right Branch canal is 47.573 km (29.560 mi). The canals begin from Ottakkal Lookout near Thenmala.

== See also ==
- Ithikkara River
- Thenmala
- Munroe Island
- Punalur
- East Kallada
- Madathara
