= Kudamutti Falls =

- Kudamutty Falls
- Location: Ambanad Hills, Kollam, India
- Number of drops: 1
- Watercourse: Achankovil River

Kudamutti Falls is a seasonal waterfall, located in the scenic Ambanad Hills range in Kollam district of Kerala, India. The falls is situated inside a large private plantation, visitors have to pass through the private plantation to reach the waterfalls. Kudamutti falls is one of the major tourist attractions in Ambanad Hills.

There is a dispute going on between the Kerala Forest and Wildlife Department and the private plantation owner about the ownership of land in which the waterfalls is situated. The plantation authorities claim that the falls is their private property and they included it in their estate tourism project. But the FOrest department claims that the location of the falls is in forest area and they have GPS proof for that.

== See also ==
- Palaruvi Falls
- Kumbhavurutty Waterfalls
- Manalar Waterfalls
- Oliyarik Waterfalls
- List of waterfalls
- List of waterfalls in India
