= Thenmala (disambiguation) =

Thenmala is a town in Kerala, India.

It may also refer to:

- Thenmala dam, a dam in Kerala.
- Thenmala railway station, a railway statio in Kerala.
