= Ambanad Hills =

Ambanad Hills Ambanad
- Hill Station
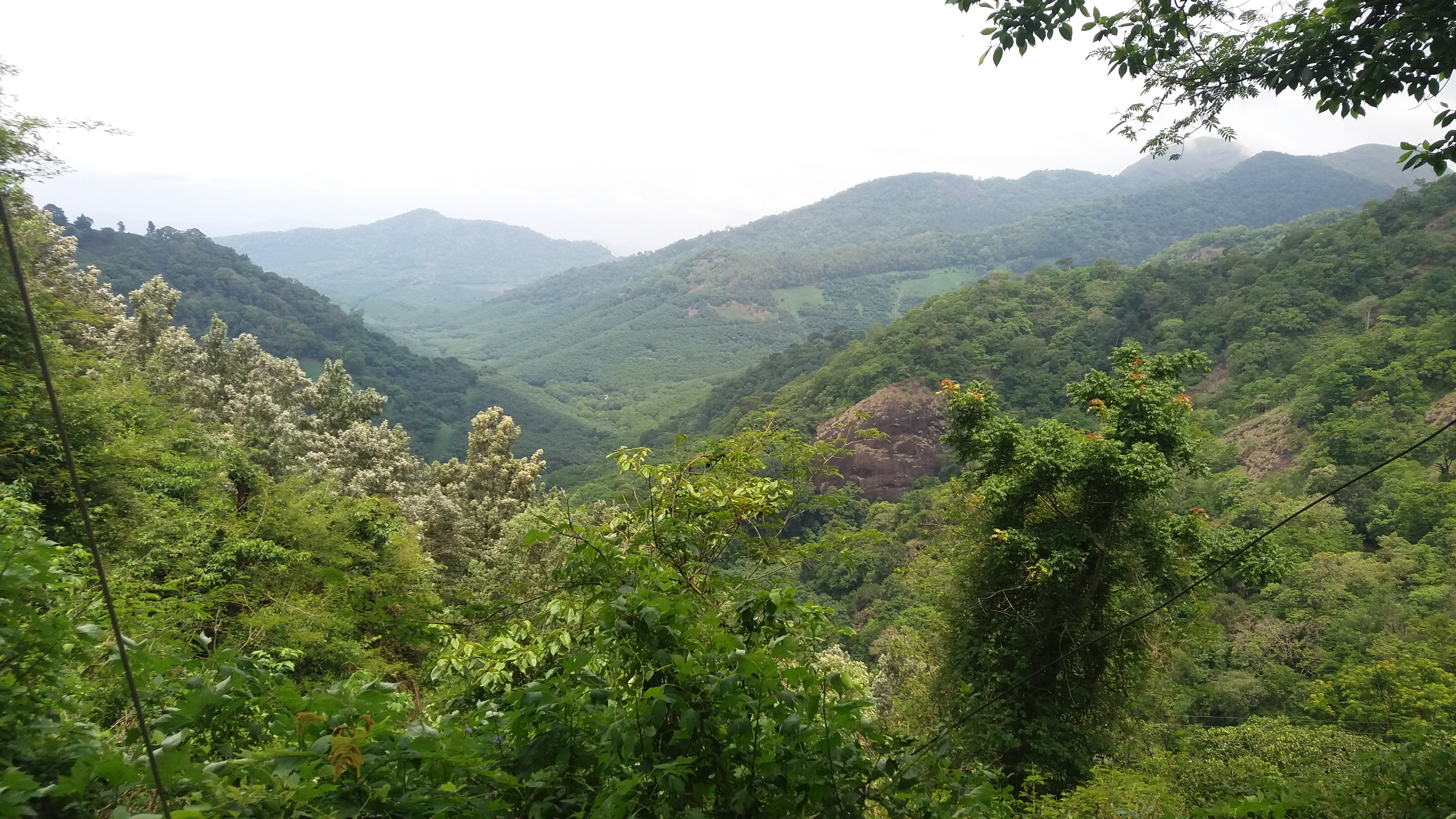
- Ambanad Hills

- Location in Kerala, India Ambanad Hills (India)
- Coordinates: 8°59′31.5054″N 77°5′4.5594″E
- Country: India
- State: Kerala
- District: Kollam
- Founder: East India Company

Government
  - Type: Democracy
  - Body: Aryankavu Panchayat

Languages
  - Official: Malayalam, English
- Time zone: UTC+5:30 (IST)
- ISO 3166 code: IN-KL
- Nearest city: Kollam
- Nearest railway station: Kazhuthurutty

Ambanad Hills or Ambanad is a hill station in Punalur Taluk in the eastern part of Kollam district in Kerala, India. This is one among the few tea and orange plantation areas in Kollam district. Ambanad Hills is in Aryankavu panchayath, about 12 km away from Kazhuthurutty.

This place is also home to Saint George Orthodox Church, Ambanad, a growing pilgrimage centre within the Diocese of Kottarakkara-Punalur of the Malankara Orthodox Syrian Church. Saint George Orthodox Church was established in 1960, with 30 families and has since dwindled to 2 families bringing significant attention and assistance from nearby Orthodox parishes. This parish is known for "Ambanad Perunnal" which takes place every May, and is the celebration of the Feast of St. George the Martyr.

The place is a famous tourist destination in South Kerala and is popularly known as 'Mini Munnar'. The tea estate in Ambanad hills is set up by the British people it is the only tea estate in Kollam district. The plantation and estate is controlled and managed by Travancore Rubber and Tea Company. The estate falls in Clove belt of India (Kollam - Nagercoil) and is one of the largest Clove estate in the country. It was one of the first places in country to which East India Company introduced clove in 1800s. The crop harvesting requires skilled labour and hence every year, the migrant labourers from Tamil Nadu will stay at the estate and work for nearly a month for harvesting the clove.

== Attractions ==
- Estate Bungalow with night stay
- Kudamutti waterfall
- View points
- Tea Factory with British era equipments
- Three lakes with pedal boating
- Nedumpara Peak

== See also ==
- Kollam
- Thenmala
- Thenmala Dam
- Kazhuthurutty railway station
- Aryankavu
