= New Aryankavu railway station =

Railway station in Kerala, India

New Aryankavu
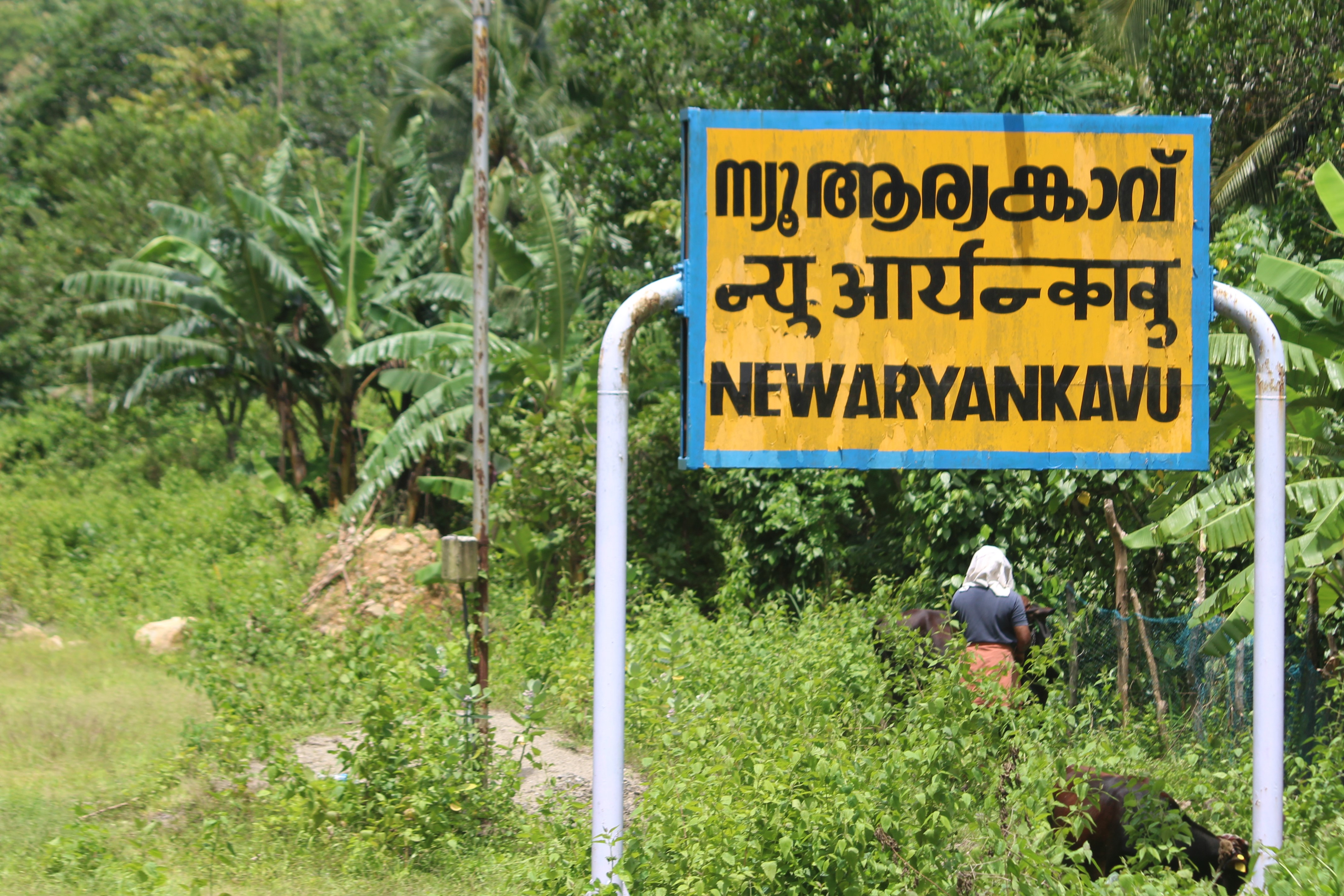
- Name board at New Aryankavu

General information
- Location: Palaruvi, Kollam, Kerala; India
- Coordinates: 8.9552°N 77.1347°E
- System: Regional rail, light rail & commuter rail station
- Owner: Indian Railways
- Operator: Southern Railway zone
- Line: Kollam–Sengottai branch line
- Platforms: 1
- Tracks: 2

Construction
- Structure type: At–grade
- Parking: Available
- Accessible: Disabled access

Other information
- Status: Functioning
- Station code: AYVN
- Zone(s): Southern Railway zone
- Division(s): Madurai
- Fare zone: Indian Railways

History
- Opened: 2018; 8 years ago

Passengers
- 2022–23: 530 per year 1 per day
Route map
Location
- Location within Kerala Location within India

New Aryankavu (station code:AYVN) is an NSG–6 category Indian railway station in Madurai railway division of Southern Railway zone. It serves New Aryankavu, located in Kollam district of the Indian state of Kerala.

== Relevance ==
The idea to build a new crossing station between Thenmala and Aryankavu on Kollam–Sengottai railway line came up in the year 2013 when the expert team found that the 114 years old Aryankavu has a gradient of only 1 in 260 suitable to accommodate meter gauge trains. So the team identified a suitable site for a new railway station with the gradient of 1 in 400 that can accommodate a broad-gauge yard in future. Around 330 trees were cut down to build the New Aryankavu railway station

== Performance and earnings ==
For the FY 2022–23, the annual earnings of the station was ₹22,360 (US$230) and daily earnings was ₹61 (63¢ US). For the same financial year, the annual passenger count was 530 and daily count was 1. While, the footfall per day was recorded as 19.

== See also ==
- List of railway stations in India
