= Aryankavu =

- Village
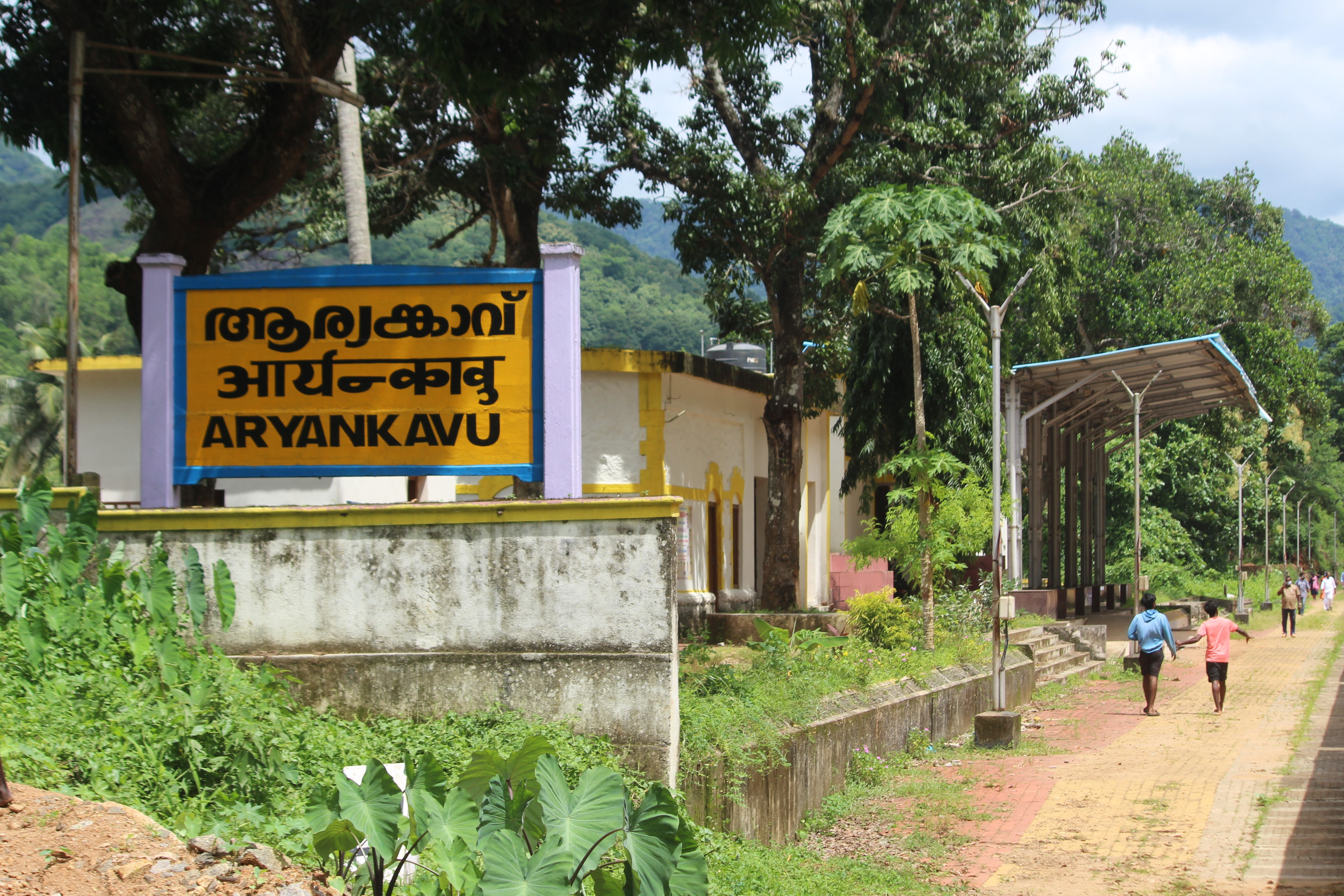
- Aryankavu Railway Station

- Location in Kerala, India Aryankavu (India)
- Coordinates: 8°58′0″N 77°8′35″E
- Country: India
- State: Kerala
- District: Kollam District

Government
  - Type: Panchayati Raj (India)
  - Body: Aryankavu Grama Panchayat

Area
  - Total: 198.84 km^{2} (76.77 sq mi)

Population (2011)
  - Total: 10,144
  - Density: 51.016/km^{2} (132.13/sq mi)

Languages
  - Official: Malayalam, English
- Time zone: UTC+5:30 (IST)
- PIN: 691309, 691316
- Vehicle registration: KL-25
- Nearest city: Kollam 76 kilometres (47 mi)
- Nearest town: Punalur 33 kilometres (21 mi)
- Climate: Tropical monsoon (Köppen)

Aryankavu is a village located in the Kollam district of the Indian state of Kerala. It lies close to the border between Kerala and Tamil Nadu near Thenmala. It is also one of the famous pilgrimage sites associated with the legend of Sabarimala. The village is located beside Shendurney Wildlife Sanctuary

== Location and connectivity ==
It is in the eastern end of Kollam district on National Highway 744 at about 22 km (14 mi) away from Tenkasi and 36 km (22 mi) away from Punalur. The village is well connected with Punalur, Kollam, Tenkasi and Thiruvananthapuram through both Tamil Nadu State Transport Corporation and Kerala State Road Transport Corporation.

The village lies along a mountain pass in Western Ghats called Aryankavu Pass or Schencottah Gap. The Kollam–Sengottai railway line also passes through Aryankavu and there are two railway stations in Aryankavu namely New Aryankavu railway station and Aryankavu railway station.

The nearby airports are Trivandrum International Airport (98 km [61 mi]), Madurai Airport (148 km [92 mi]) and Tuticorin Airport (115 km [71 mi]).

== Demographics ==
As of 2011 India census, Aryankavu had a population of 10144 with 4896 males and 5248 females. The most spoken languages in Aryankavu is Malayalam . Due to its close proximity to Tamil Nadu, and numerous tamil sabrimala pilgrimages, Tamil is also widely spoken and understood. There is also Malapandaram tribal population in Aryankavu.

== Aryankavu Pass/ Schencottah Gap ==
It is a mountain pass connecting Kollam district and Tenkasi district and the village is located along this pass. This pass along with Palakkad Gap and Aralvaimozhi gap is a significant pass that connects Kerala side of Western Ghats with Coromandel Coastal plains of Tamil Nadu. The pass is a narrow low-lying area in Western Ghats with altitude lesser than 300 metres (980 ft). The Kollam–Sengottai railway line and National Highway 744 passes through this pass. In the western end of the gap there is Kallada River valley. The pass plays an important role in the climate of nearby Punalur as it keeps the mercury levels in the town significantly higher than nearby areas.

The gap along with Achankovil Shear Zone plays the role of an ecological divide. It separate the Agasthyamala Biosphere Reserve from Cardamom Hills and High Range of Kerala.

== Attractions ==
=== Palaruvi water falls ===
The Palaruvi Falls is located in the forest, five kilometres (3.1 mi) away from Aryankavu check post. The name `Paal' means milk & `Aruvi' means stream. There is a train named Palaruvi Express that passes through Aryankavu which is named after this falls.

=== Kadamanpara Sandal Forest ===
It is the second largest natural sandal forest after Marayur. It is situated in Aryankavu Grama panchayath.

=== Rose Mala ===
Rose Mala is a place in Aryankavu which is 11.8 km away from Aryankavu Junction. It is one of the ecotourism spots which provides view of Thenmala Dam reservoir. There is a view point called Rajathottam near Rosemala which offers view of Tenkasi.

=== Nedumpara ===
Nedumpara is a place which is 11 km (6.8 mi) away from Aryankavu. Harrisons Malayalam limited has a rubber estate in this place named as Isfield Estate. One of the highest peak of Kollam district named Nedumpara Peak is located in Nedumpara, which is locally known as Nedumpara Motta. It is the water divide between Kallada River and Achankovil river.

=== Bourdillon's Plot ===
It is the world's first stump-planted teak plantation, located near the Palaruvi Falls in Aryankavu. A British man named T. F. Bourdillon was its leader. He was then conservator of Travancore.

=== Ambanad Hills ===
Ambanad Hills is the only tea estate of Kollam district. It is also one of the largest Clove plantation in Kerala. The estate also has tangerine plantations.

== Religion ==
Hinduism is the major religion at the village. There is also a sizeable Christian and Muslim population.

=== Aryankavu Shasta Temple ===
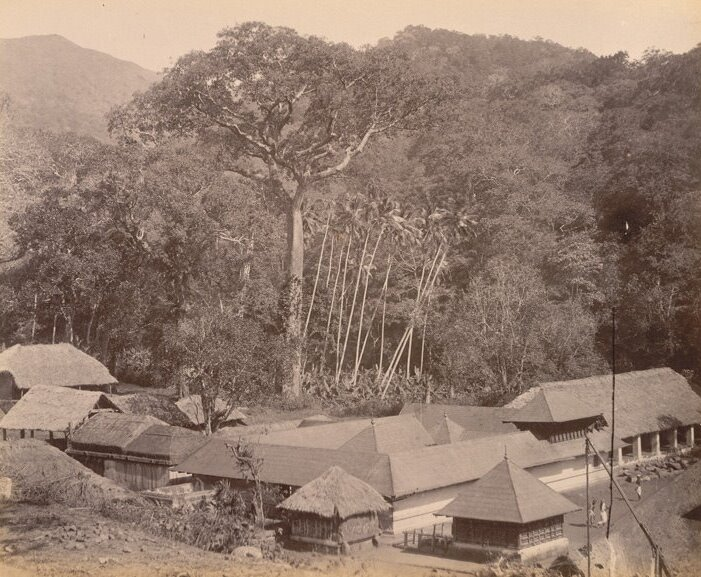
Aryankavu temple (1890)

The temple dedicated to Shasta at Aryankavu is situated near the border of Tamil Nadu. The temple is one of the important Shasta temples in Kerala. Ayyappan is depicted here as a teenager (young boy). The deity is known as Thiru Aryan and therefore the place got the name Aryankavu.

Surrounded by forests, the temple is located on the National Highway 744. Just like in Sabarimala, women from the age 10 to 50 are not allowed inside the temple. The rituals and pujas followed at the temple is that of Tamil tradition. The sanctum sanctorum of the temple has idols of Pushkaladevi, Shiva and Shasta. A young Ayyappa sits in the middle with Pushkaladevi on the left side and Shiva on the right side.

The festival at the temple is celebrated during the concluding days of the Sabarimala Mandala Kalam. The most important festivals observed here include Pandiyan Mudippu, Thiru Kalyanam and Kumbhabhishekham. There are plans to include the temple as part of Sabarimala circuit.

=== Other religious places ===
There are two catholic churches: St. Mary's Catholic Church Archdiocese of Changanassery & St. George Malankara Catholic Church at Aryankavu. The St. George Malankara Catholic Church was established in the 1950s. The founder of the Church was Mr. K.V Abraham Vaidyer (Kaleekal) also known as Kannadi Vaidyar. He was an Ayurvedic physician as well as a member of the Grama Panchayat in 1957.

There are also numerous Evangelicalist churches that are active in the area.

The major center of worship of Muslims is the Edappalayam Juma Masjid.

== See also ==
- Palakkad Gap
- Aralvaimozhi
