= Timeline of Southern Railway zone =

This is the timeline for India's Southern Railway zone that encompasses present day Tamil Nadu, Kerala and parts of Andhra Pradesh and Karnataka.

== Timeline ==
=== 19th century ===
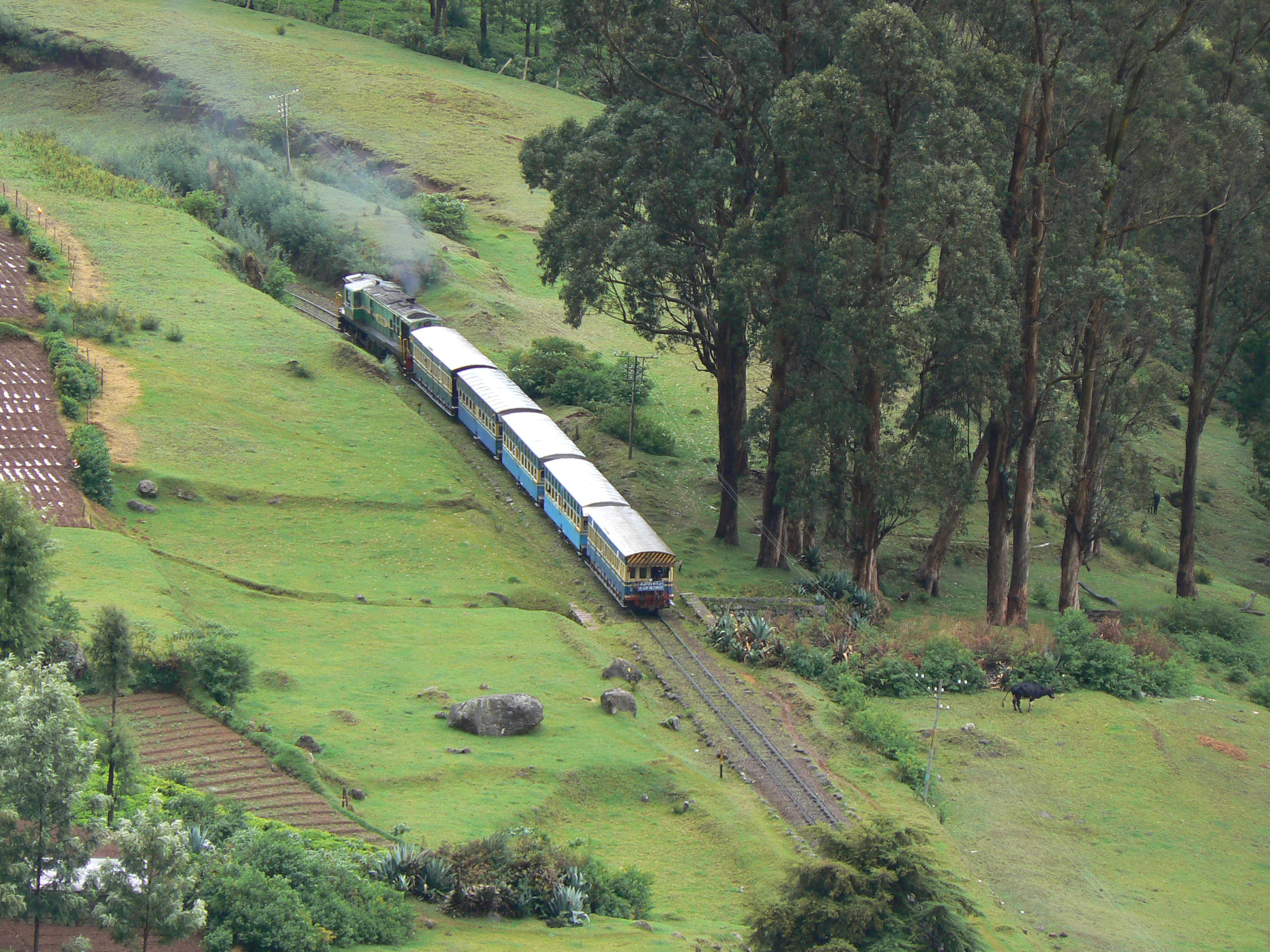
Nilgiri Mountain Railway, Chennai, in the Southern Railway zone is a UNESCO World Heritage site.

- 1845 Madras Railway Company was launched.
- 1853 Madras Railway Company, registered in Chennai (Royapuram) began work.
- 1856 July 1, First passenger rail service began from Royapuram - Walajapet (Walaja Road) route. Perambur loco workshop set up in Vaughan.
- 1856 July 1, 1856 Second passenger rail service began from Royapuram - Tiruvallur (Tiruvallur).
- 1857: Walajapet(Walaja Road) - Cuddalore route was proposed via: Katpadi, Tiruvannamalai, Tirukoilur.
- 05.04.1859 Construction of Railway System started at Nagapattinam to lay BG track to Tanjore by the Great Southern of India Railway Company (G.S.I.R).
- 1861: Tirur - Chaliyam (Kozhikode) route commissioned . Great Southern Railway of India Tiruchirappalli - Nagapattinam (broad gauge) up to 125 km from the gauge set. Walaja road - Cuddalore route came to existence via: Tiruvannamalai, Viluppuram.
- 01.05.1861 BG section from Kuttipuram to Tirur opened
- 18.07.1861 Old Coimbatore Now Podanur Station Building was Completed
- 02.12.1861 First BG train from Negapatam to Tanjore inaugurated.
- 11.3.1869 Track extended to Trichinopoly' from Tanjore and further extended to 'Trichinopoly Fort' (BG section)
- 1862: Madras Railway Company's Tram way for local transport established in Chennai.
- 1864: Jolarpettai - Bengaluru mail began service.
- 14.04.1862 BG section from Podanur to Pattambi opened
- 12.05.1862 BG section from Sankaridurg to Podanur opened
- 01.02.1864 First Express Train of South India "Blue Mountain Express" From Old Coimbatore (#Podanur) To Chennai Royapuram Started
- 1865: GSIR's General Office building constructed at Trichinopoly
- 08.05.1865 BG section from Conjeevaram to Arkonam opened.
- 03.12.1866 BG section opened between Trichinopoly Fort and Karur.
- 01.07.1867 BG section opened between Karur and Kodumudi
- 01.01.1868 BG section opened between Kodumudi and Erode.
- 1868: Service began in Nagapattinam - Tiruchirappalli.
- 01.02.1873 BG section from Podanur to Coimbatore Junction opened. Opening of Coimbatore Railway Station.
- 01.02.1873 BG section opened from Vellalore Road to Nanjundapuram Coimbatore Junction.
- 07.04.1873 Partial Opening of Madras Central (Now Puratchi Thalaivar Dr. M.G. Ramachandran Chennai Central Railway Station)
- 31.08.1873 BG section from Coimbatore Jn. to Mettupalayam opened Opening of Mettupalayam Railway Station.
- 01.07.1874 The South Indian Railway Company (SIR) formed by amalgamating the Great Southern of India Railway Co. and the Carnatic Railway Co.
- 26.01.1875 Nidamangalam to Tiruvarur section converted from BG to MG.
- 19.06.1875 Tiruvarur to Negapattanam section converted from BG to MG.
- 03.07.1875 Tanjore to Nidamangalam section converted from BG to MG.
- 10.07.1875 Track between Tanjore to Budalore converted from BG to MG.
- 17.07.1875 Track between Budalore to Trichinopoly Junction converted from BG to MG.
- 01.09.1875 MG section opened from Trichinopoly Junction to Madura.
- 01.01.1876 MG section opened from Madura to Tuticorin.
- 01.01.1876 MG section opened from Maniyachi to Tinnevelly.
- 01.09.1876 MG section from Madras Park to Tindivanam opened.
- 01.01.1877 MG section from Tindivanam to Cuddalore Junction opened.
- 15.02.1877 MG section from Mayavaram to Tanjore opened
- 01.07.1877 MG section from Cuddalore Jn. to Porto Novo opened.
- 01.07.1877 MG section from Shiyali to Mayavaram opened
- 01.01.1878 MG section from Coleroon to Shiyali opened.
- 14.07.1878 Conjeevaram to Arkonam section converted from BG to MG.
- 21.08.1878 G.O.No. 810 issued for the transfer of Railway HQ from Negapatam to Trichinopoly.
- 01.10.1878 MG section from Porto Novo to Chidambaram opened.
- 01.01.1879 MG section from Madras Beach old to Park opened.
- 01.07.1879 MG section from Chidambaram to Coleroon opened.
- 01.07.1879 Track between Trichinopoly to Karur Converted from BG to MG.
- 15.12.1879 MG section from Villupuram to the Gingee river inclusive of the bridge over the river opened
- 15.12.1879 MG section from East bank of the Gingee river to Pondicheri opened.
- 16.12.1879 Track between Karur to Erode Converted from BG to MG.
- 1879: Metre gauge line between Puducherry and Viluppuram formed according to an agreement between French Government and the British Government.
- 1880 Agent's Office shifted from Negapatam to Trichinopply.
- 01.08.1880 MG section from Chingleput to Walajabad opened.
- 01.01.1881 MG section from Walajabad to Conjeeveram opened.
- 30.09.1885 Original Nilgiri Mountain Railway Company registered.
- 1886 Engineering workshop opened at Trichinopoly.
- 1886 Some portion of workshop activities transferred from Negapatam to Trichinopoly
- 02.01.1888 BG section from Kadallundi to Calicut opened
- 02.01.1888 BG section opened from Olavakkot to Palghat.
- 1890 The "South Indian Railway" company which was incorporated in England came into being at Trichinopoly
- 17.11.1890 MG section from Villupuram to Tiruvannamalai opened.
- 18.03.1891 MG section from Tiruvannamalai to the outer signal of Katpadi opened.
- April 1894 Original Nilgiri Mountain Railway Company Liquidated.
- 1891: Nilgiri Mountain Railway Company was commissioned.
- 02.04.1894 MG section opened from Mayavaram Junction to Mutupet.
- Feb. 1896 New Nilgiri Mountain Railway Company formed.
- 1898: Metre gauge line between Karaikal and Peralam formed according to an agreement between French Government and the British Government.
- 1899: Mettupalayam (Coimbatore) - Coonoor service of Nilgiri mountain railway began. Olavakkode - Palakkad line constructed.
- 1899: Chennai - Vijayawada passenger service began. Boat Mail from Chennai to Ceylon, with passenger ship with a connecting service between Dhanushkodi (Rameswaram) and Ceylon started.
- 14.03.1899 Mettupalayam - Coonoor MG section opened for traffic.
- 07.08.1899 MG section opened from Tuticorin to Foreshore.
- 01.12.1899 MG section from Negapatam to Nagore opened.
- 15.01.1900 MG line from Madras Beach Junction to Madras Beach opened.

=== 20th century ===
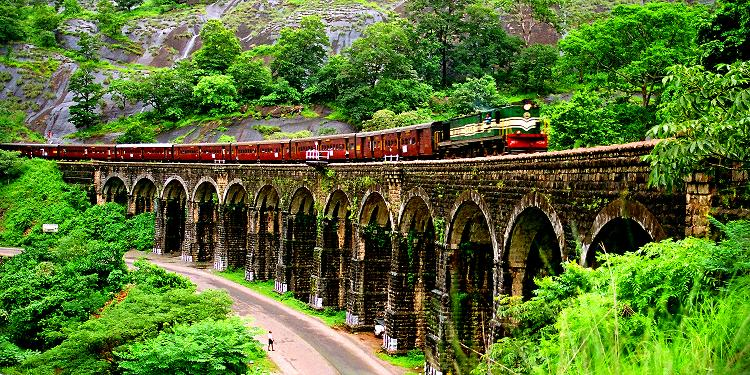
13 arch bridge situated at Thenmala on Kollam-Chennai railway line

- 01.10.1901 BG section from Calicut to Badagara opened.
- 01.01.5.1902 BG section from Badagara to Tellicherry opened.
- 01. 01.6.1902 MG section from Tinnevelly to Kallidaikurichi opened.
- 16.7.1902 Ernakulam - Shoranur path was set up.
- 1902: Kollam–Sengottai branch line was constructed to link port cities of Madras and Quilon together.
- 01.08.1902 MG section between Manamadurai Jn. to Mandapam opened.
- 01.08.1902 MG section opened from Madura to Manamadura.
- 20.10.1902 MG section opened from Mutupet to Pattukottai.
- 20.05.1903 BG section from Tellicherry to Cannanore opened.
- 01.08.1903 MG section opened from Kallidaikurici to Shencottah.
- 31.12.1903 MG section opened from Pattukottai to Arantangi.
- 15.03.1904 BG section from Cannanore to Azhikkal opened.
- 01.06.1904 MG section opened from Punalur to Quilon.
- 26.11.1904: Passenger train service started on Quilon-Madras railway line.
- 18.09.1905 NG (2 '6") section opened from Tiruppattur to Krishnagiri.
- 18.01.1906 NG (2' 6") section opened from Morappur to Dharmapuri.
- 21.08.1906 BG section from Azhikkal to Kanhangad opened.
- 01.09.1906 MG section opened from Pamban to Rameswaram
- 01.10.1906 BG section from Kanhangad to Kasaragod opened.
- 17.11.1906 BG section from Kasaragod to Kumbla opened.
- 21.01.1907 Feasibility Survey Report for India - Ceylon Railway was submitted by South Indian Railway Company.
- 03.07.1907 BG section from Kumbla to Mangalore opened.
- 1908: Chennai Egmore was built.
- 01.01.1908 Sections of Madras Railway Company transferred to South Indian Railway.
- 15.09.1908 MG section opened from Coonoor to Fernhill.
- 15.10.1908 MG section opened from Fernhill to Ootacamund.
- 10.12.1908 MG section opened from Rameswaram Road to Dhaneshkodi Jetty.
- 15.05.1913 NG (2'6") section opened from Dharmapuri to Hosur.
- Dec. 1913 Scherzer Rolling Bridge constructed at Pamban viaduct.
- 01.01.1914 MG section opened from Mandapam to Pamban
- 01.12.1914 MG section opened from Dhanushkodi Jetty to Dhanushkoai point.
- 15.02.1915 MG section opened from Nidamangalam to Mannargudi.
- 15.10.1915 MG section opened from Podanur to Pollachi.
- 01.01.1917 BG section opened from Salem Junction to Salem Market and Salem Market to Salem Town
- 01.01.1918 MG section opened from Quilon to Chakai.
- 15.05.1919 MG section opened from Tituthuraipundi to Agastiyampalli.
- May 1921 Traffic control by telephone commenced between Madras Egmore -Villupuram - Tanjore main line section inaugurated.
- 24.02.1923 MG section opened from Tinnevelly to Tiruchendur.
- 1923 A 2'-0" gauge tramway line was opened from Golden Rock to Sircarpalayam to a distance of 2.827 miles for carrying materials and trolley movement of the Inspecting Officials of the Railway.
- 1925 Water Storage Plant constructed at Sircarpalayam (near Trichinopoly).
- 25.11.1926 MG section opened from Mayavaram to Tranquebar
- 03.02.1927 BG section opened from Shoranur to Angadipuram
- 01.03.1927 'Publicity Branch' inaugurated under a whole time officer for publicity of all branches including railway Time Table.
- 30.06.1927 MG section opened from Virudunagar to Tenkasi
- 03.08.1927 BG section opened from Angadipuram to Vaniyambalam
- 22.08.1927 MG section opened from Srirangam to Golden Rock.
- 15.10.1927 MG section opened from Pamban to Rameswaram Road.
- 26.10.1927 BG section opened from Vaniyambalam to Nilambur Road.
- 01.12.1927 MG section opened from Villupuram to Vriddhachalam.
- 12.12.1927 MG section opened from Bikshandarkoil to Srirangam.
- 16.01.1928 Central Workshop at Golden Rock established.
- 10.03.1928 MG section opened from Lalgudi to Bikshandarkoil.
- 21.06.1928 MG section opened from Cuddalore Junction to Vriddhachalam.
- 1928 MG shop floor except Stores Department closed at Negapatam.
- 1928 BG shop floor at Podanur closed
- 19.11.1928 MG section opened from Dindigul to Pollachi.
- 20.11.1928 MG section opened from Madura to Bodinayakanur.
- 01.02.1929 MG section opened from Vriddhachalam to Lalgudi.
- 15.04.1929 BG section from Salem to Mettur Dam branch including the mileage of assisting siding from Mecheri Road to Mettur Dam opened.
- 17.04.1929 MG section opened between Trichinopoly Junction to Pudukottai.
- 25.09.1929 Track between Erode to Trichinopoly converted from MG to BG in a record time of 5 hours
- 1929: Chennai suburban railway service began.
- 01.07.1930 MG section opened between Pudukottai to Manamadurai Jn.
- 1930 Trichinopoly Marshalling Yard commissioned.
- 03.02.1931 Salem Junction to Salem Market section and Salem Market to Salem Town section converted into mixed gauge of BG and MG.
- 03.02.1931 MG section opened from Salem Town to Chinnasalem.
- 01.04.1931 Through goods line from Cammerford Block Station to Broad Gauge Buffer end in Trichinopoly Goods Station opened.
- 01.04.1931 Through goods line between Trichinopoly Junction and Golden Rock via classification yard opened
- 02.04.1931 MG Electrified suburban service from Madras Beach to Tambaram inaugurated
- 20.04.1931 Traffic Training School started at Trichinopoly to train probationers and signallers of Traffic department
- 11.05.1931 First electric train for public service from Madras Beach to Tambaram started.
- 17.08.1931 MG section opened from Chinnasalem Junction to Vriddhachalam.
- 04.11.1931 MG section opened from Chakai to Trivandrum Central.
- 21.11.1931 Dry dock at Mandapam for docking the SIR Steamers completed and T.S.Irwin was first docked at Mandapam
- 01.04.1932 BG Section between Olavakkot to Palghat converted into mixed gauge.
- 01.04.1932 MG section opened from Pollachi to Palghat.
- 1934: Ernakulam - Shoranur gauge conversion.
- 1935 Trichinopoly Passenger Station remodelled with six additional platforms, two subways and two Road-over-bridges.
- 20.01.1936 MG section opened from Agastiyampalli to Point Calimere.
- 01.07.1940 Idappalli-Ernakulam extension opened for BG good traffic.
- 01.07.1940 BG section between from Bridge Head to Cochin Pier to a distance of 4.07 miles opened.
- 10.07.1941 MG section opened from Nanjundapuram Block Station to Coimbatore Jn.
- 31.07.1941 NG (2' 6") section from Dharmapuri to Hosur closed for traffic.
- 31.07.1941 NG (2' 6") section from Tiruppattur to Krishnagiri closed for traffic,
- 31.10.1941 NG (2' 6") section from Morappur to Dharmapuri closed for traffic.
- 12.11.1941 Short link (0.50 miles)near Shoranur to connect main line with Shoranur - Cochin Railway opened
- 01.04.1944 Contract with SIR Co. and M & S.M. Co. terminated and working of the railways taken over by Government of India
- 01.04.1950 Mysore State Railway Co. came under the direct control of Govt, of India
- 14.04.1951 Southern Railway formed integrating Madras & Southern Mahratta Railway Company, the South Indian Railway Company and theM ysore State Railway Company
- 1951: Madras and Southern Mahratta Railway, the South Indian Railway Company, and the Mysore State Railway were united to form a new zone of the Southern Railway.
- 24-12-1952 Ernakulam - Kollam MG line - turning of first sod by Shri Jawaharlal Nehru, Prime Minister of India.
- 16-05-1956 Formation of Divisions in Southern Railway
- 23-08-1957 Opening of Renigunta - Gudur broad gauge section
- 1957 The Railway Press at Royapuram was expanded during 1957.
- 00-01-1958 Opening of Ernakulam - Quilon metre gauge line
- 00-00-1958 Establishment of S & T workshop Podanur
- 01-09-1963 opening of Virudhunagar - Aruppukkottai metre gauge line
- 02-05-1964 opening of Aruppukkottai -Manamadurai metre gauge line
- 00-01-1965 Conversion of DC 1.5 kV electrified system to 25 kV AC system from Chennai Beach to Tambaram
- 02-10-1966 Creation of South-Central Railway and handing over of Bezwada, Guntakal and Hubli Divisions to SC Railway
- 23-11-1975 Broad gauge conversion of Ernakulam - Kollam MG section
- 13-09-1976 Inauguration of Thiruvananthapuram Central - Ernakulam BG section via Kottayam
- 00-00-1976 Tamil Nadu Express from New Delhi - Chennai Central started its operation.
- 15-07-1977 Inaugural run of Vaigai Express.
- 13-04-1979 Electrification of Chennai - Gummidipundi section
- 20-05-1979 Inauguration of Mangaluru - Hassan MG line
- 09-08-1979 Electrification of Chennai Beach - Korukkupet - Madras Central
- 02-10-1979 Creation of Thiruvananthapuram Division
- 29-11-1979 Electrification Chennai - Tiruvallur section
- 27-07-1981 Creation of Bengaluru Division
- 03-09-1982 Electrification of Tiruvallur - Arakkonam section
- 11-08-1984 Electrified train services Between Chennai - Katpadi
- 00-00-1984 Vaigai Express was bifurcated into Vaigai and Pallavan Express.
- 00-00-1985 Phasing out BG Steam locomotives
- 14-04-1987 Inauguration of EMU service Chennai - Avadi
- 25-07-1987 First solid state interlocking in Indian Railways at Srirangam Station
- 02-10-1987 Introduction of Computerised Passenger Reservation
- 06-08-1988 Inauguration of Karur - Dindigul BG line
- 15-10-1989 Opening of Ernakulam – Alappuzha BG line
- 16-09-1991 Inauguration of MRTS project between Madras Beach - Park Town
- 01-11-1992 Introduction of first Rajdhani Express in Southern Railway between Bengaluru - Nizamuddin
- 20-11-1992 Inauguration of Alappuzha - Kayamkulam BG line
- 00-03-1992 Electrification of Jolarpettai - Bangalore section
- 16-04-1993 Opening of Bengaluru - Mysuru BG line
- 21-10-1993 Inauguration of Karur - Dindigul - Madurai - Thoothukudi BG project
- 09-05-1994 Introduction of first Shatabdi Express between Chennai – Mysuru
- 31-08-1994 Inauguration of Chikjajur - Chitradurga - Rayadurg BG line
- 02-04-1995 Inauguration of Chennai Beach-Tambaram BG line
- 11-01-1997 Opening of Salem - Bengaluru BG line
- 19-10-1997 Inauguration of MRTS project between Madras Beach - Thirumayilai
- 01-01-1998 Thiruchchirappalli and Thanjavur new parallel BG (SOkms) was opened for Passenger traffic
- 22-08-1998 Inauguration of Tambaram - Tiruchirappalli (chord line) and Tiruchirapalli - Thanjavur opened after gauge conversion.
- 06-01-1999 Opening of Tiruchirappalli - Dindigul BG line
- 15-06-1999 Centenary Celebrations of Nilgiri Mountain Railway

=== 21st century ===
- 19-06-2000 Quilon-Trivandrym 65 km doubling Work completed and opened for passenger traffic
- 23-07-2000 Inauguration of Electric traction between Thrissur-Ernakulam
- 13-10-2000 Opening of 100th Computerised Passenger Reservation Centre at Kovilpatti
- 30-10-2000 Commissioning of optical fibre communication link between Villupuram-Tiruchirapalli
- 22-11-2000 Inauguration of new BG line between Penukonda and Puttaparthi
- 03-03-2001 MG main line between Chennai Egmore and Tambaram is converted and commissioned for BG passenger traffic
- 2002: Southern Railway, Bengaluru and Mysuru divisions separated to form the South Western Railway. Ernakulam, Thrissur electrified.
- 2003: Southern railways started operating trains from Anna Nagar west railway station and inaugurated that railway station.
- 06-01-2003 Vriddhachalam - Vadalur( 27 km) was opened for traffic
- 01-06-2003 Gauge Converted section between Virudhunagar and Rajapalayam (52 kms) was opened for passenger traffic
- 23-12-2003 Valiikunnu and Kadaiundi - Ferok (3.485 km) was opened for passenger traffic
- 29-12-2003 Vadalur - Cuddalore Port Junction (30 Km) was opened for Passenger traffic
- 2003 Two MG lines from Chennai Beach to Chennai Egmore have been converted into Broad Gauge and opened for

passenger traffic February'2003.

- 2003 The gauge Conversion of B line between Tambaram-Chengalpattu (30 Km) has been completed and opened

for traffic in Nov. 03.

- 14-02-2004 The up line between Coimbatore and Coimbatore North (2.7. kms) has been completed and opened for

traffic.

- 23-04-2004 The section between Caiicut and Feiok (8.843 km) was opened for passenger traffic
- 02-05-2004 Thanjavur - Kumbakonam Section (39 kms) was opened for passenger traffic
- 2004: Flying train of MRTS started service from Mylapore to Thiruvanmiyur in Chennai .
- 18-09-2004 The quadrupling work of Pattablram-Tlruvallur section (16km) have been completed
- 20-09-2004 Gauge Converted section between Rajapalayam -Tenkasi (69 Km) -was opened for passenger traffic
- 01-11-2004 Gauge Conversion works between Chennai Egmore and Tambaram have been completed and open for traffic
- 24-11-2004 The section between Kadaiundi and Tanur (7.83 km) was opened for passenger traffic
- 2005: The Nilgiri Mountain train declared as one of the UNESCO World Heritage site.
- 30-04-2005 Madurai - Manamadurai was opened for passenger traffic
- 01-07-2005 The section between Kadaiundi and Ferok (0.796 km) Diversion portion was opened for passenger traffic
- 20-07-2005 The section between Tanur and TIrunavaya (16,6 km) was Qpened for passenger traffic
- 12-06-2006 Ernakulam Junction - Ernakulam Marshalling Yard Doubling (3 kms) Works completed' and

commissioned

- 17-06-2006 GC work between Kumbakonam and Mayiladuthurai (31 kms) completed. After CRS inspection In 18 & 19th April 2006, the newly converted section from Mayiladuthurai to Kumbakonam has been inagurated and opened for passenger services on 17/06/2006 and handed over to Division on 27/2/2008.
- 29-09-2005 The section between Tirunayaye and Kuttipuram (6.17 km) was opened for passenger traffic
- 2006: Villupuram - Mayiladuthurai (main line) gauge conversions started.
- 25-03-2006 Kuttipuram and Pallipuram (9.65 km) was opened for passenger traffic
- 14 November 2006: Salem division was formed.
- 05-01-2007 Tiruchchirappalli and Pudukottai (53 kms) was opened for passenger traffic
- 19-05-2007 Pudukottai and Karaikkudi section also completed and opened for passenger traffic
- 12-01-2007 Thanjavur and Tiruvarur (55kms) was opened for Passenger traffic
- 13-03-2007 The section between Pallipuram and Shoranur (19.283 kms) opened for passenger traffic
- 01-05-2007 - Rail services on Kollam-Punalur section of the Kollam–Sengottai branch line withdrawned for gauge conversion works.
- 2007: First movement on Pamban bridge after broad gauge conversion.
- 2007: train service up to Anna Nagar discontinued.
- 12-08-2007 Manamadurai and Rameswaram (114 krns) opened for passenger traffic
- 18-11-2007 Vriddhachalam and Salem section (134 km) is opened for passenger traffic
- 19-11-2007 MRTS train services extended up to velacherry.
- 2008: Virudhunagar - Manamadurai gauge conversion started.
- 07-02-2008 Tenkasi- Sengottai (8 Kms) opened for passenger traffic
- 02-07-2008 Karaikudi - Manamadurai Section opened for passenger traffic
- 27-09-2008 Tiruneiveli and Tiruchendur(61.21 kms) was opened for passenger traffic
- 20-11-2008 Katpadl-Vellore (10 kms) section and opened for passenger traffic
- 10-12-2008 : Pollachi - Palghat Gauge conversion started
- 2009: Dindigul - Pollachi - Podanur Gauge Conversion started
- 27-02-2009 Tiruvarur and Nagore (30.37 Kms) completed and opened for passenger traffic
- 2010 - Kollam-Thiruvananthapuram broad gauge line electrified
- 2010: Vizhupuram - Mayiladuthurai (main line) services started.
- 01-12-2013 Inauguration of Palakkad MEMU Shed
- 10-05-2010 - Kollam-Punalur broad gauge section thrown open for services
- 2011: Sengottai - Punalur gauge conversion began.
- 2011: Madurai - Bodinayakkanur gauge conversion began.
- 19-03-2012 - First MEMU service on Kollam-Ernakulam route flagged off
- 2012: Thiruvarur - Pattukottai - karaikudi gauge conversion began.
- 2012: Dindugal - palani train service starts
- 14-07-2012 Virudhunagar - Manamadurai BG line opened.
- 31-11-2012 - First MEMU service on Kollam-Kanyakumari route flagged off
- 2013: Inauguration of Karur - Salem line.
- 01-12-2013 Inauguration of Kollam MEMU Shed
- 09-01-2015: Palani - Pollachi train service starts
- 16-11-2015: Pollachi - Palghat train service starts
- 2016: Electric traction between Shoranur - Cheruvathur completed
- 31-03-2018 - The entire Kollam–Sengottai line thrown open for passenger train services.
- 2018: Doubling of railway line completed till Madurai from Chennai(chord line).
- 2019: Thiruvarur - pattukottai - Karaikudi gauge Conversion ends and track opened for traffic.
- 22-01-2020 - Madurai Junction to Usilampatti Stretch on the Madurai to Bodinayakkanur Railway line completed and opened for traffic
- 29-09-2020 - Singaperumal koil to Guduvancherry stretch on the Tambaram to Chengalpattu 3rd line opened for traffic
- 11-11-2020 - Mayiladuthurai to Thanjavur Main line electrified. By this the entire main line got electrified.
- 12-11-2020 - Kadambur to Gangai kondan and Vanchi Maniyachchi to Tataparai doubling completed and opened for traffic (chord line)
- 16-12-2020 - Usilambatti to Andipatti section open es for traffic on the Madurai Bodinayakkanur railway line.
- 20-01-2021 - Walajaroad Junction to Ranipettai Railway line opened for traffic(goods traffic only).
- 15-02-2021 - Chennai beach to Athipattu 4th line works completed and opened for traffic.
- 26-05-2022 - Inaguural of Madurai Junction to Teni BG section.
- 01-10-2026 - Transfer of Mangalore region (From Ullal till Padil) to SWR
