= National Highway 744 (India) =

National highway in India

National Highway 744
- Map of National Highway 744 in red

Route information
- Auxiliary route of NH 44
- Maintained by NHAI
- Length: 206 km (128 mi)
- History: Announced as 'NH-208' in 2000

Major junctions
- West end: NH 66 in Kollam, KL
- at Kallumthazham at Kottarakkara at Punalur
- East end: NH 44 in Tirumangalam, TN

Location
- Country: India
- States: Kerala, Tamil Nadu

Highway system
- Roads in India; Expressways; National; State; Asian
← NH 544H	→ NH 744A

National Highway 744 or NH 744 (earlier NH 208) is a National Highway in Southern India that links Kollam in Kerala with Madurai in Tamil Nadu. Starting from NH 66 at Chinnakkada in Kollam, it joins Tirumangalam in Madurai at National Highway 44 (India).

== Route description ==
This route has historically connected the cashew and spice producing Kollam District with the erstwhile Madras State. Nowadays, hordes of lorries carrying various goods from Tamil Nadu ply through this highway. The road cuts through the narrow low altitude gap at Aryankavu, and is a visual delight, especially the stretch from Thenmala to Sengottai. The historic Kollam-Sengottai Railway line goes by the side of the road.

Chinnakada → Kallumthazham →Keralapuram → Kundara → Ezhukone → Kottarakkara → Chengamanad → Kunnicode → Vilakkudy → Punalur → Edamon → Thenmala → Kazhuthurutty → Aryankavu → Shenkottai → Ilanji → Tenkasi → Kadayanallur → Puliangudi → Vasudevanallur → Sivagiri → Seithur → Rajapalayam → Srivilliputtur → Alagapuri → T. Kallupatti → Tirumangalam

== Future ==
As per news reports and NHAI tender & project data, it has been confirmed that the section of NH 744 between Tirumangalam (on NH 44) and Rajapalayam is being taken up to be converted into a tolled, four lane highway for a total distance of 68 km. The stretch between Kollam and Senkottai will be developed as a greenfield access-controlled highway.

The work of preparing the Detailed Project Report (DPR) for the 208 km long National Highway-744 between Kollam-Tirumangalam near Madurai is being promoted by the National Highways Authority of India (NHAI) under Bharatmala Pariyojana Phase I.

During the Budget 2021, Finance Minister Mrs. Nirmala Sitharaman proposed the Madurai-Kollam corridor.

In 2023, Prime Minister Narendra Modi laid the foundation stone for the Kollam-Madurai National Highway 744.

Project is being implemented in the following manner.

Si.No	State	Project	Length
1	Tamil Nadu	Tirumangalam- Vadugapatti	36
2	Tamil Nadu	Vadugapatti- South Venganallur (Rajapalayam)	35.6
3	Tamil Nadu	Rajapalayam- Sengottai (I)	35.4
4	Tamil Nadu	Rajapalayam- Sengottai (I)	32.9
5	Tamil Nadu	Sengottai- Aryankavu	7
6	Kerala	Aryankavu - Edamon	23
7	Kerala	Edamon - Kadambattukonam	38.62
Total			208.52

On the Madurai-Kollam highway, work is being carried out in the first phase from Thirumangalam to Vadugapatti and from Vadugapatti to South Venganallur and Rajapalayam at a cost of Rs. 2415 crore.

The second phase of work will begin from Rajapalayam to Sengottai at a cost of Rs. 2849.22 crore.

== Major intersections ==
State	District	Location	km	mi	Destinations	Notes
Tamil Nadu	Madurai	Tirumangalam	0	0	NH 44 - Madurai, Kanyakumari	Eastern end of the highway.
Tamil Nadu	Virudhunagar	Alagapuri	32	20	SH 182 - Virudhunagar	
Tamil Nadu	Virudhunagar	Srivilliputhur	86	53	SH 42 - Sivakasi	
Tamil Nadu	Tenkasi	Puliyankudi	136	85	SH 76 - Sankarankoil	
Tamil Nadu	Tenkasi	Thenkasi	167	104	SH 39 / SH 40 - Pavoorchatram, Courtallam	
Tamil Nadu	Tenkasi	Sengottai	173	107	SH 40 - Courtallam	
Kerala	Kollam	Thenmala	202	126	SH 2 - Thiruvananthapuram	
Kerala	Kollam	Punalur	223	139	SH 48 / SH 8 - Anchal, Ayoor, Pathanapuram	
Kerala	Kollam	Kunnikode	232	144	Sabari Bypass - Pathanapuram	
Kerala	Kollam	Kottarakkara	241	150	SH 1 - Thiruvananthapuram, Kottayam, Angamaly	
Kerala	Kollam	Kollam	264	164	NH 66 - Thiruvananthapuram, Attingal, Ernakulam	Western end of the highway. Kollam bypass.
1.000 mi = 1.609 km; 1.000 km = 0.621 mi

== Gallery ==
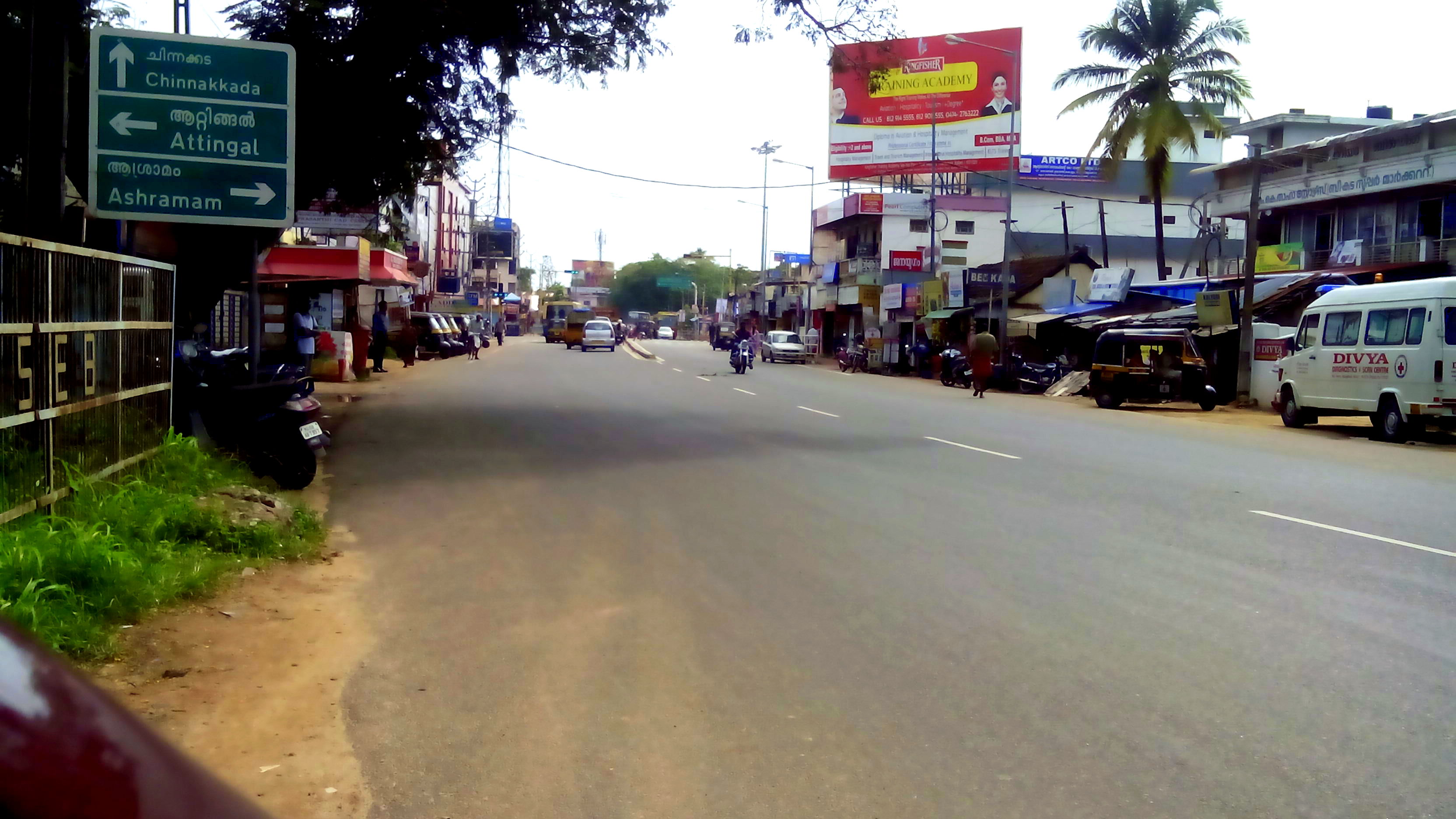
NH-744 at Kadappakada, Kollam City

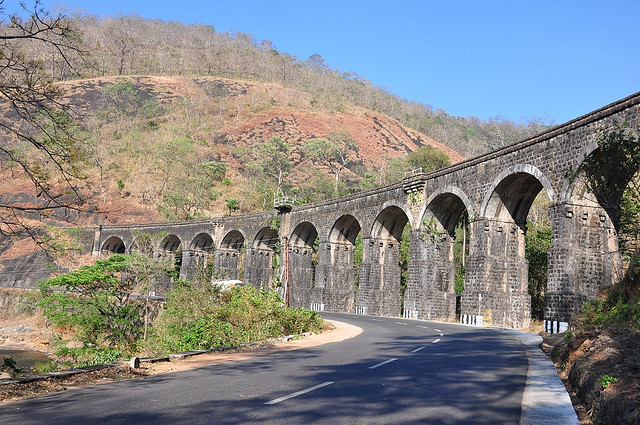
13 Arch Bridge near the side of NH 744, Thenmala

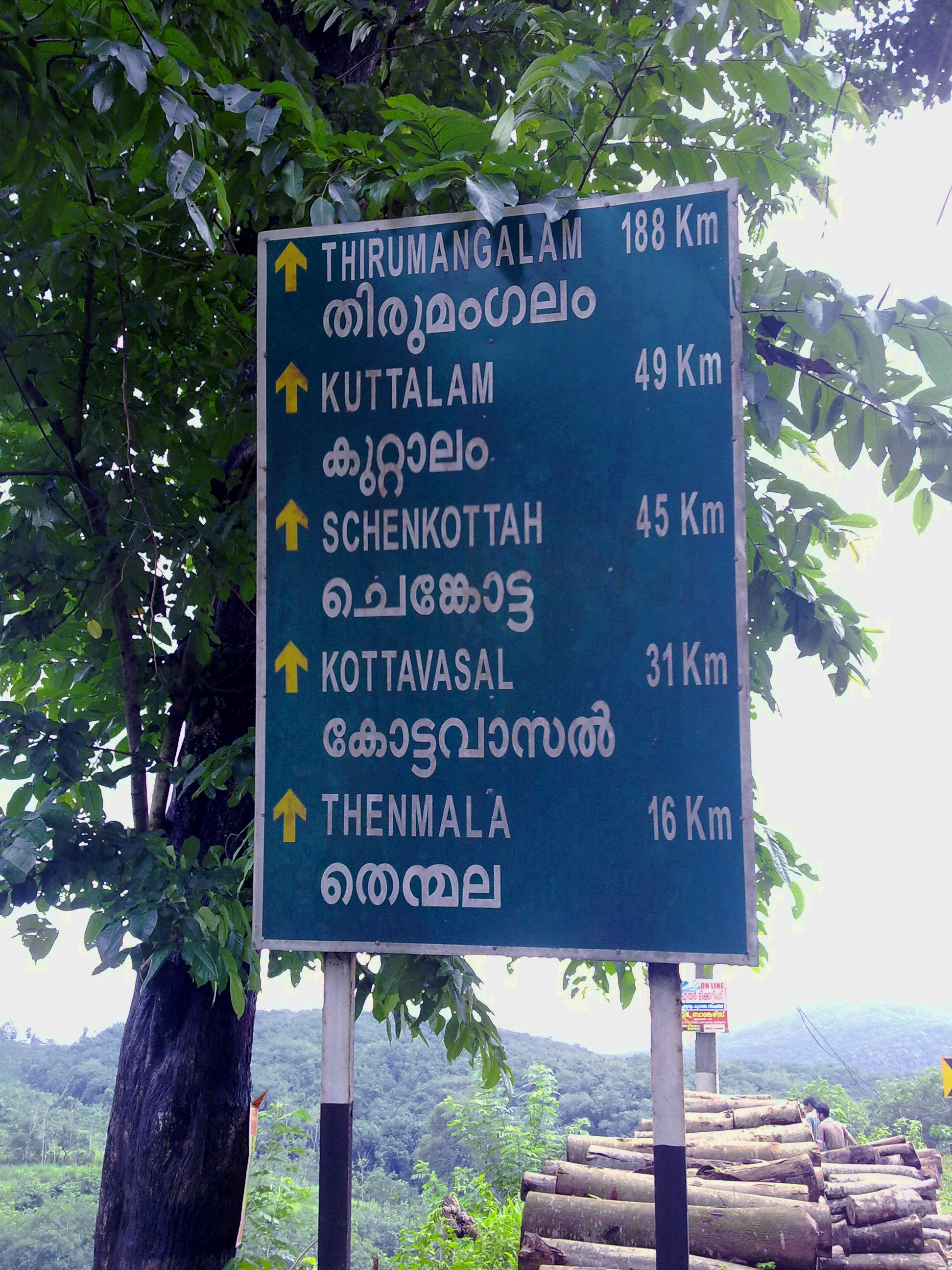
A sign board in NH 744

== See also ==
- List of national highways in India
- National Highways Development Project
