= Nedumpara Peak =

Mountain in India

- നെടുമ്പാറ
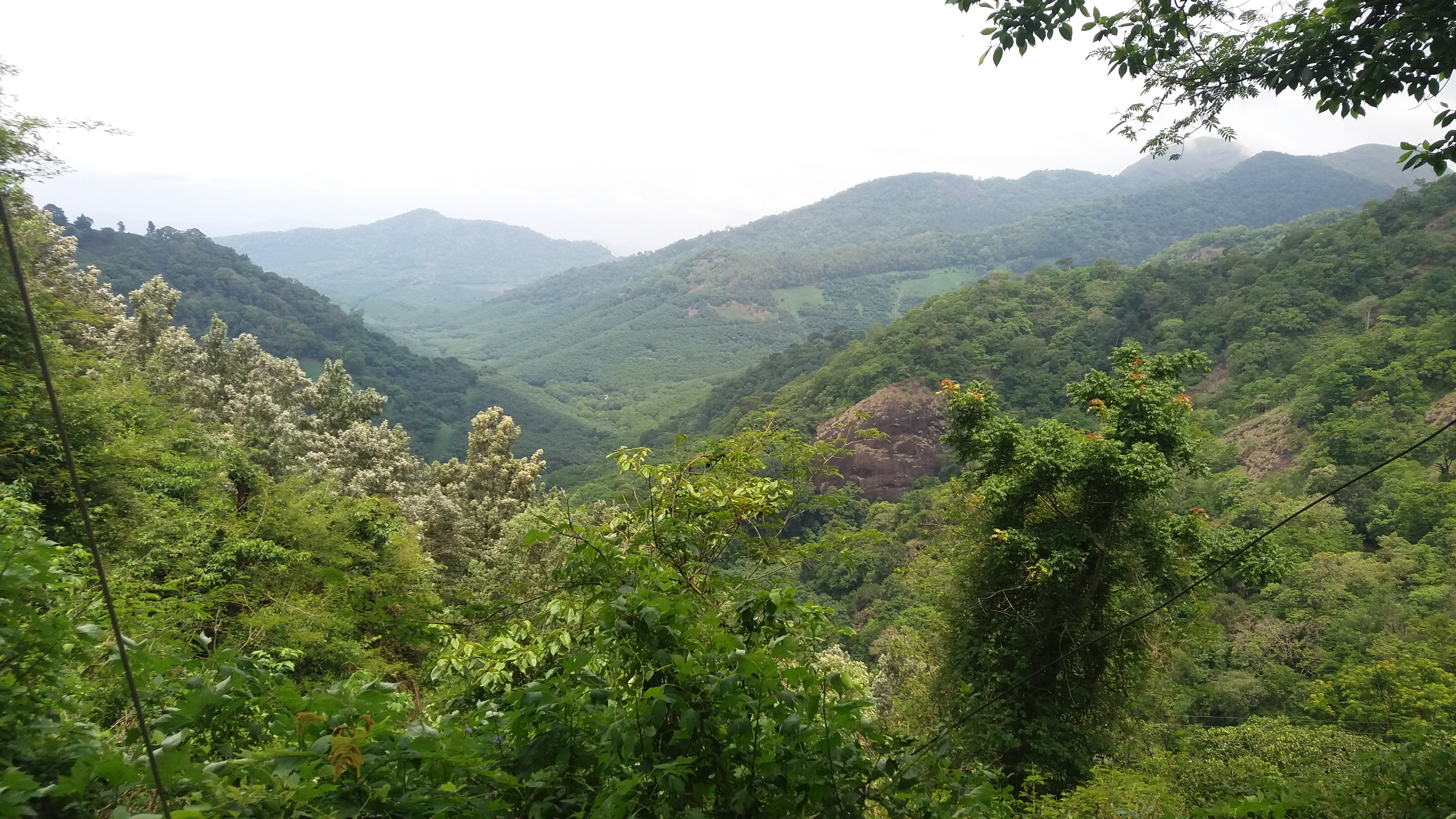
- Distant view of Ambanad Hills and Nedumpara peak

Highest point
- Elevation: 900 m (3,000 ft)

Naming
- Language of name: Malayalam

Geography
- Location: Punalur Taluk, Kollam, India
- Parent range: Western Ghats

Nedumpara Peak is one of the highest peaks in the Western Ghats, situated in the Kollam district of Kerala, India, at an elevation of 900 m (3,000 ft). The peak is situated at Ambanad Hills near Aryankavu. It is just 7 km (4.3 mi) from Thenmala.
