= Melilla (disambiguation) =

Melilla is an exclave of Spain in North Africa.

Melilla also may refer to:

== Places ==
- Melilla (Santurce), a subbarrio of Santurce, San Juan, Puerto Rico
- Lezica-Melilla, rural area of Montevideo Department, Uruguay

== Politics ==
- Melilla (Congress of Deputies constituency), a constituency of the Spanish Congress of Deputies
- Melilla (Senate constituency), a constituency of the Senate of Spain

== Ships ==
- Italian cruiser Aquila, which served as the destroyer Melilla in the Spanish Nationalist Navy from 1937 to 1939 and in the Spanish Navy from 1939 to 1950

== See also ==
- Mellilla, a genus of moths
- Mellilä, a former municipality of Finland
- Mellila, Morocco, a town and rural commune in Benslimane Province, Casablanca-Settat, Morocco
- Melila, Kollam, a village in Kollam district in the state of Kerala, India
