= Aryankavu Tunnel =

Colonial-era railway tunnel

Aryankavu Railway Tunnel

Overview
- Official name: Aryankavu–Puliyara (Kottavasal) Tunnel
- Other names: Kottavasal Tunnel, Thenmala Tunnel
- Line: Kollam–Sengottai Chord Line
- Location: Aryankavu, Kerala - Tamilnadu Border
- Status: Active
- Crosses: Western Ghats
- Start: Aryankavu in Kerala
- End: Puliyara in Tamil Nadu

Operation
- Work began: 1901
- Opens: 1903
- Owner: Indian Railways
- Operator: Southern Railway zone of Indian Railways
- Traffic: Train

Technical
- Length: 891.70 m (2,925.5 ft)
- No. of tracks: 1
- Track gauge: 1,676 mm (5 ft 6 in) (Broad gauge)
- Electrified: Yes
- Operating speed: 30km/hour
- Max elevation: 274.320 Meters above M.S.L

The Aryankavu–Puliyara (Kottavasal) tunnel, also known as the "Aryankavu tunnel", is a railway tunnel located in the southern Western Ghats on the Kerala-Tamil Nadu border in India. This 891.70 meter long tunnel is a section of the Kollam-Sengottai railway line, which was the first line in the former Travancore Kingdom and has been in operation for more than a century. This tunnel's construction began in 1901, and two years later, in 1903, it was finally completed. The Travancore Kingdom's conch insignia has been inscribed on both sides of the tunnel. Aryankavu railway station in Kerala and Bhagavathipuram Station in Tamil Nadu are connected via the Aryankavu tunnel. It is the longest railway tunnel in Kerala and contains the state border between Tamil Nadu and Kerala. The border between Kerala and Tamil Nadu is located 672 meters inside the tunnel from the Aryankavu entrance in Kerala.
