= Pathimoonnu Kannara Bridge =

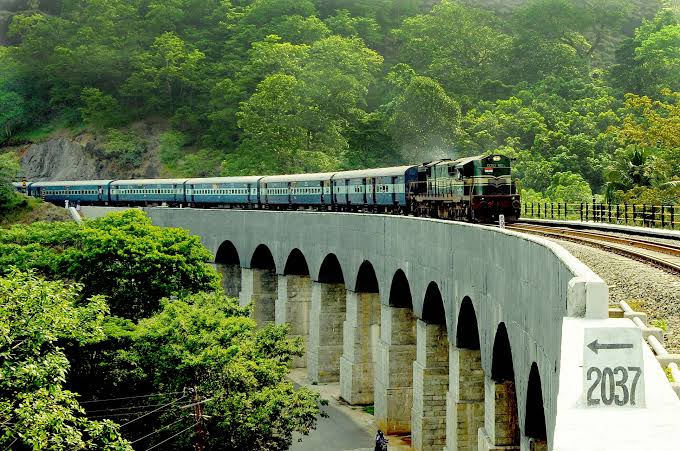
- View of the bridge after renovation
- Coordinates: 8°58′03″N 77°05′27″E
- Carries: Indian Railways
- Crosses: valley in Kazhuthurutty
- Other name(s): 13 Arch Bridge

Characteristics
- Design: Arch bridge
- Material: Rocks, limestone, and jaggery (Surki method)
- Total length: 102.72 meters (337.0 ft)
- Height: 5.18 meters (17.0 ft)
- No. of spans: 13

Rail characteristics
- No. of tracks: 1
- Track gauge: Broad gauge (5 ft 6 in)

History
- Construction start: 1900
- Construction end: 1903
- Inaugurated: 1904

The Pathimoonnu Kannara Bridge, also called the "13 Arch Bridge", is a historic British-era structure on the Kollam-Sengottai railway line in India. It is situated at Kazhuthurutty in the Kollam district of Kerala. The bridge is a part of one of India's oldest mountain rail lines and was constructed by the British in 1904 to transport goods from Kollam to Madras. The bridge was constructed with just rocks, limestone, and jaggery (Surki method), and it has 13 arches. The bridge, which connects two hillocks, is supported by thirteen granite pillars that are about 100 feet tall. The bridge is sandwiched by the River Kazhuthurutti on one side and the Kollam Thirumangalam National Highway (NH 744) on the other.

== Gallery ==
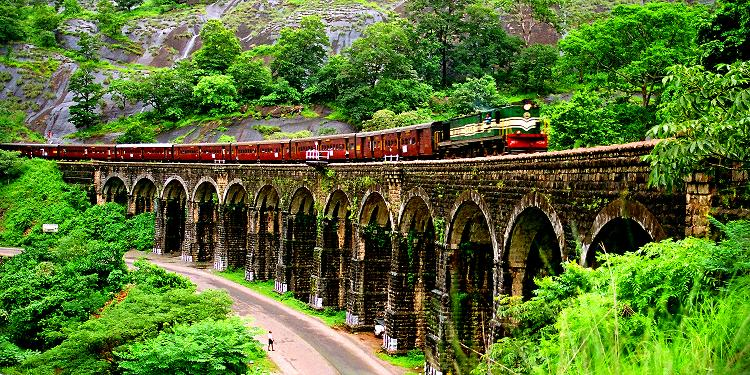
View of the bridge during monsoon (before renovation).

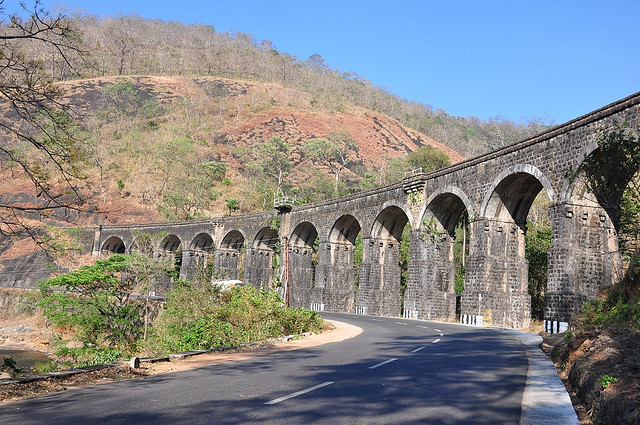
View of the bridge during summer (before renovation).
