= Kumbhavurutty Waterfalls =

- Kumbhavurutti Waterfall കുംഭാവുരുട്ടി വെള്ളച്ചാട്ടം
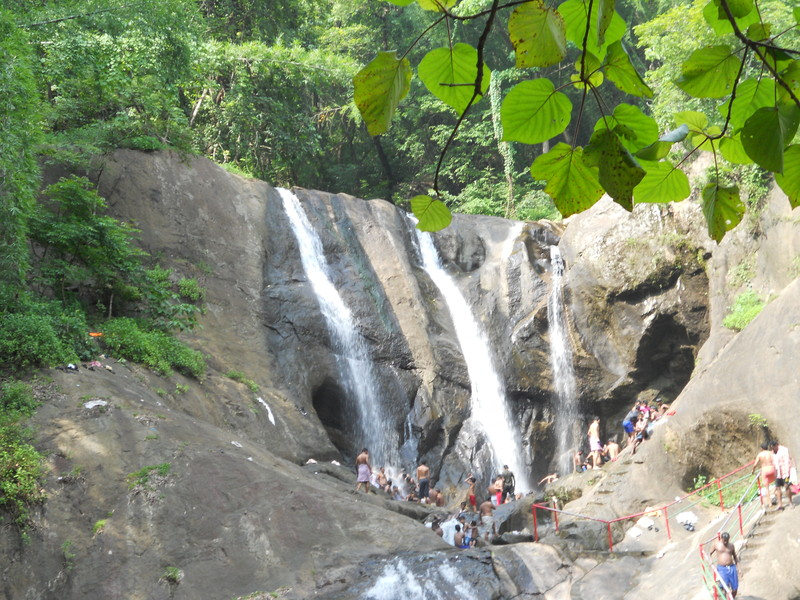
- Kumbhavurutty Waterfalls
- Interactive map of Kumbhavurutty Waterfalls
- Location: Kollam District, Kerala, India
- Coordinates: Kerala_scale:50000 9°5′5″N 77°10′22″E
- Type: Segmented
- Number of drops: 2
- Watercourse: Achankovil River

Kumbhavurutty Waterfall is a famous waterfalls in South India situated near Aryankavu panchayath in Kollam district of Kerala near Tamil Nadu border. It is located 6.5 km away from Achenkovil. Palaruvi Falls is another nearby attraction of this falls.

== See also ==
- List of waterfalls
- List of waterfalls in India
- Palaruvi Falls
- Manalar Waterfalls
- Oliyarik Waterfalls
