= Kudukkathu Para =

Rock formation in Kerala, India

- Rock formation
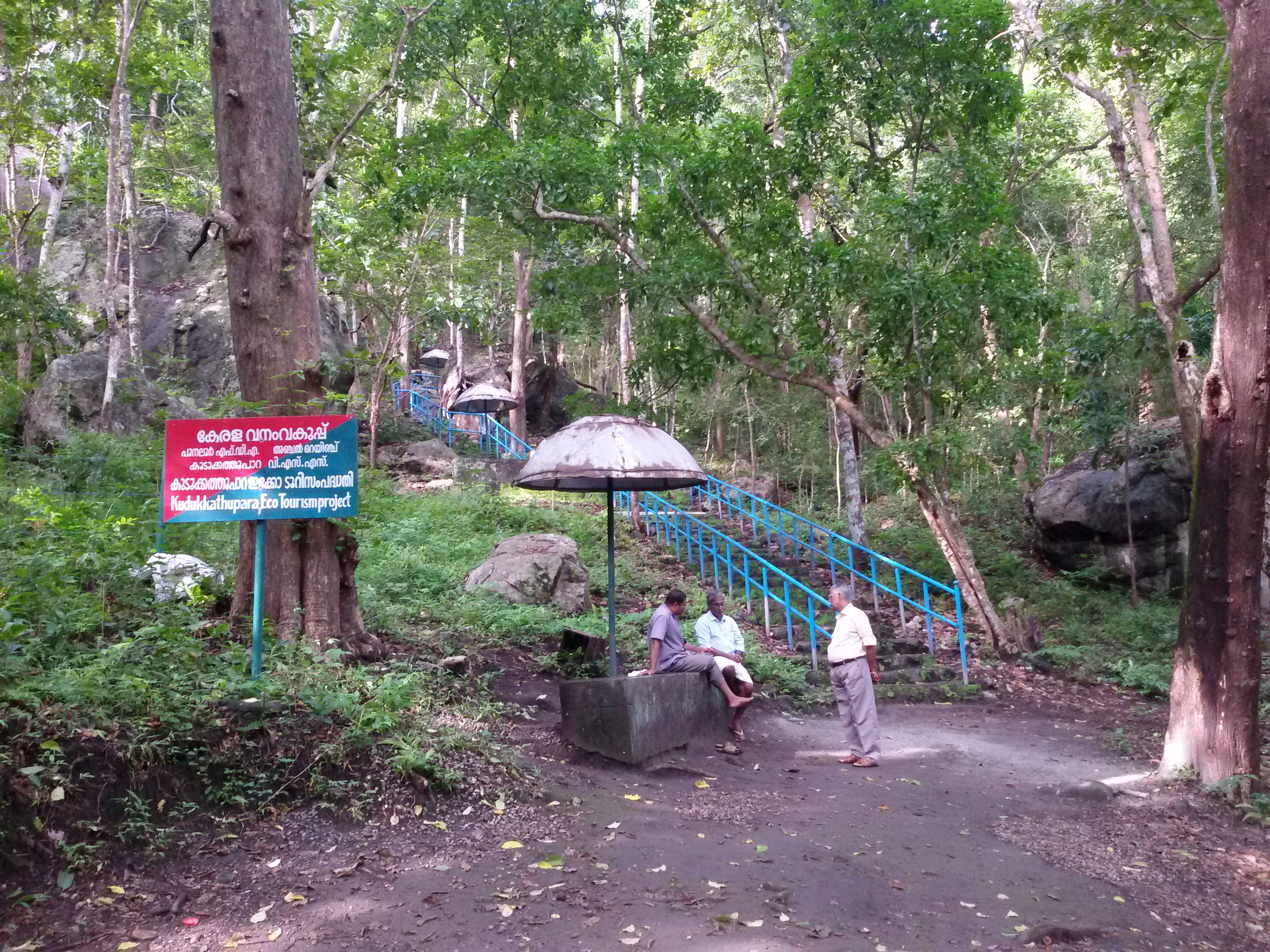
- Entrance to Kudukkathu Para

- Location in Kerala
- Coordinates: 8.8873°N 76.9822°E
- Location: Anchal Alayamon, Kerala, India
- Elevation: 840 m (2,760 ft)
- Website: https://keralaforestecotourism.com

Kudukkathu Para is a complex of three rocks situated at Anakkulam in Anchal Forest range and Anchal block Panchayath of Kollam district in Kerala, India, and is a popular tourist spot. The rock structure is 840 metre above sea level, and is developed as an eco-tourism project by the Kerala Forest Department. The spot is around 1 km away from Anakkulam junction, and is approachable from Channapetta in the north.

Visitors can climb two rocks, or 780 metres, while the third one, the tallest, is not accessible. Four districts of Kerala and a small part of Tamil Nadu can be viewed from top of the second tallest rock. The Kudukathu Para Eco-tourism Promotion Council is formed with a view to promoting the tourist spot.

== See also ==
Channapetta
