= Melila, Kollam =

Melila
- village
- Location in Kerala, India Melila (India)
- Coordinates: 9°0′30″N 76°51′0″E
- Country: India
- State: Kerala
- District: Kollam

Government
  - Type: Panchayati raj (India)
  - Body: Gram panchayat

Population (2011)
  - Total: 22,203

Languages
  - Official: Malayalam, English
- Time zone: UTC+5:30 (IST)
- Postal code: 691508
- Vehicle registration: KL- 24

Melila is a village in Kollam district in the state of Kerala, India situated along the Pathanapuram - Thiruvananthapuram Sabari Bypass road. The nearest NH, National Highway 744 (India) is at Kunnicode. The nearest Railway station is Auvaneeswaram railway station. The region—which is surrounded by dense rubber plantations—has been used as a location for a number of Malayalam movies, including Mutharamkunnu P.O. and Kottaram Veettile Apputtan. There are also many well-known Television artistes from the region such as TV anchor and news reader Melila Sreekandan Nair of Asianet (TV channel). Melila is the first Village in Kerala to complete 100% Aadhaar Enrollment.

The Famous Hindu Temple, Sree Dharma Shastha Temple is located in Melila which is also famous for its Bhadrakali Mudiyettu (മുടിയേറ്റ്).

== Location ==
Melila village is situated towards the Eastern boundary of kottarakara taluk, The village is located in Kottarakara taluk about 7 km away from the taluk headquarters. It comes under the Pathanapuram Legislative Assembly and Mavelikkara Parliamentary constituency.

== Demographics ==
As of 2011 India census, Melila had a population of 22,203 with 10,330 males and 11,873 females.
