= National Highway 744A (India) =

National highway in India

National Highway 744A

Route information
- Length: 82.6 km (51.3 mi)

Major junctions
- From: National Highway 744
- To: National Highway 44

Location
- Country: India
- States: Tamil Nadu

Highway system
- Roads in India; Expressways; National; State; Asian

National Highway 744A, commonly called NH 744A, is a national highway in the state of Tamil Nadu in India. It is a secondary route of National Highway 44.

== See also ==
- List of national highways in India
