= Manalar Waterfalls =

- Manalaar Waterfalls മണലാര്‍ വെള്ളച്ചാട്ടം
- Interactive map of Manalar Waterfalls
- Location: Kollam District, Kerala, India
- Coordinates: Kerala_scale:50000 9°4′2″N 77°10′53″E
- Type: Segmented
- Number of drops: 1
- Watercourse: Achankovil River

Manalar Waterfalls is situated at Achankovil in Kollam district of Kerala. It is on the eastern area of Kollam District and Konni forest. Manalar Waterfall is about 112 km away from Kollam city.

== See also ==
- List of waterfalls
- List of waterfalls in India
- Kumbhavurutty Waterfalls
- Palaruvi Falls
- Oliyarik Waterfalls
