= Kazhuthurutty railway station =

Railway station in Kerala, India

Kazhuthurutty

General information
- Location: Kazhuthurutty, Kollam, Kerala; India
- Coordinates: 8.97003°N 77.09795°E
- System: Regional rail, Light rail & Commuter rail station
- Owner: Indian Railways
- Operator: Southern Railway zone
- Line: Kollam–Sengottai branch line
- Platforms: 2
- Tracks: 2

Construction
- Structure type: At–grade
- Parking: Available

Other information
- Status: Functioning
- Station code: KZTY
- Zone(s): Southern Railway zone
- Division(s): Madurai
- Fare zone: Indian Railways

History
- Opened: 1904; 122 years ago
Route map
Location
- Location within India Location within Kerala

Kazhuthurutty railway station (Code: KZTY) is a railway station in Kollam, Kerala and falls under the Madurai railway division of the Southern Railway zone, Indian Railways.
