= Kunnicode =

Town in Kollam, Kerala, India

Kunnicode is a town on NH 744 (Kollam-Thirumangalam highway) in the Kollam District.

== Location ==
It is located 8 km (5.0 mi) from Kottarakkara, 10 km (6.2 mi) from Pathanapuram and 10 km (6.2 mi) from Punalur.

== Politics ==
Kunnicode is a part of Pathanapuram Assembly in Mavelikara (Lok Sabha constituency). Shri Kodikunnil Suresh is the present member of parliament. Shri K. B. Ganesh Kumar is the current MLA.

== Transportation ==
There is a recent proposal to construct Sabari ByPass, which serves as an alternative to travel from Thiruvananthapuram to Sabarimala (The normal route is through Kottarakkara, Adoor and Pathanamthitta). This proposed route passes through Kunnicode.
