= Channapetta =

- Panchayat
- Location in Kerala, India Channapetta (India)
- Coordinates: 8.8892°N 76.9557°E
- Country: India
- State: Kerala
- District: Kollam

Government
  - Type: Gram panchayat

Languages
  - Official: Malayalam, English
- Time zone: UTC+5:30 (IST)
- PIN: 691311
- Nearest city: Punalur

Channapetta is a village in Kollam district of Kerala state, India. It is situated 8 km away from the nearest town Anchal.

Channapetta lies on the foothills of the Western Ghats. Kerala Government has an e-literacy project centre, Akshaya, in the village.
