= Thenmala railway station =

Railway station in Kerala, India

Thenmala
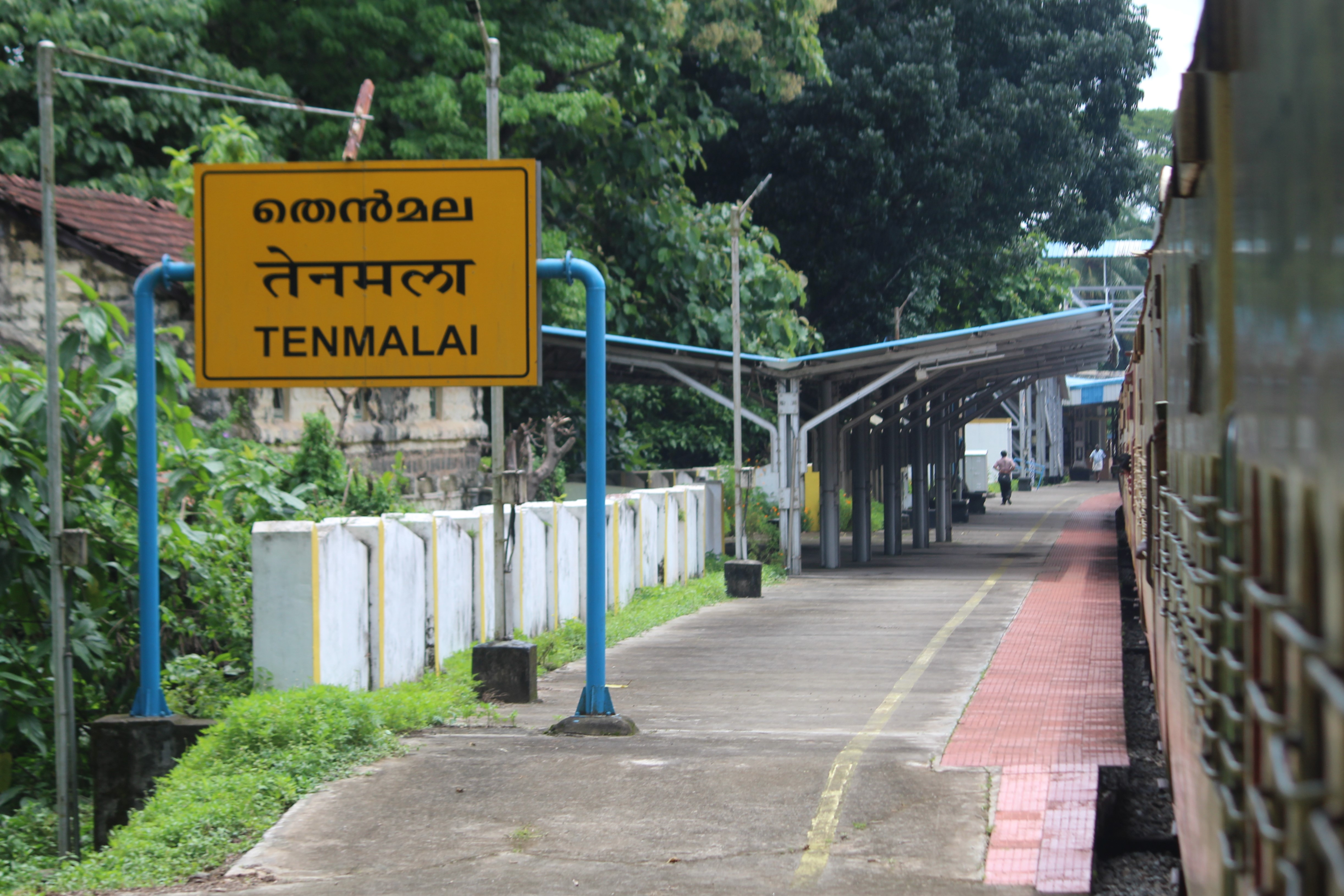
- Tenmalai sign board

General information
- Location: Thenmala, Kollam district, Kerala; India
- Coordinates: 8.9669°N 77.0727°E
- System: Regional rail, light rail & commuter rail station
- Owner: Indian Railways
- Operator: Southern Railway zone
- Line: Kollam–Sengottai branch line
- Platforms: 2
- Tracks: 2

Construction
- Structure type: At–grade
- Parking: Available

Other information
- Status: Functioning
- Station code: TML
- Zone(s): Southern Railway zone
- Division(s): Madurai
- Fare zone: Indian Railways

History
- Opened: 1904; 122 years ago

Passengers
- 2022–23: 7,527 per year 21 per day
Route map
Location
- Location within Kerala Location within India

Thenmala railway station (station code:TML) is an NSG–6 category Indian railway station in Madurai railway division of Southern Railway zone. It serves Thenmala, located in Kollam district of the Indian state of Kerala.

== Performance and earnings ==
For the FY 2022–23, the annual earnings of the station was ₹454,669 (US$4,700) and its daily earnings was ₹1,246 (US$13). For the same financial year, the annual passenger count was 7,527 and daily count was 21. The footfalls per day was recorded as 51.
