= Oliyarik Waterfalls =

- ഓലിയരിക് വെള്ളച്ചാട്ടം
- Location: Kollam District, Kerala, India
- Type: Segmented
- Watercourse: Kallada River

Oliyarik Waterfalls is a waterfall situated near Anchal in Kollam district, India. It is the less known one among the four waterfalls in Kollam district. The falls is about 55 km away from Kollam city.

== See also ==
- List of waterfalls
- List of waterfalls in India
- Kumbhavurutty Waterfalls
- Palaruvi Falls
- Manalar Waterfalls
