= Thenmala Dam =

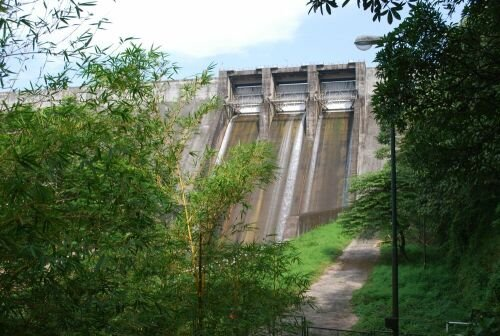
- Thenmala Dam

- Location within Kerala Location within India
- Official name: Kallada dam
- Country: India
- Location: Thenmala, Kollam, Kerala
- Coordinates: 8°57′14″N 77°4′11″E
- Purpose: Irrigation
- Status: Operational
- Opening date: 1986

Dam and spillways
- Height: 85.35 m (280.0 ft)
- Length: 335 m (1,099 ft)
- Spillways: 3
- Spillway type: Ogee with radial gate auxiliiary- Labyrinth

Reservoir
- Total capacity: 524,000,000 m^{3} (424,814 acre⋅ft); Maximum Water Level; 115.82 metres, 380.0 ft
- Active capacity: 507,000,000 m^{3} (411,032 acre⋅ft)
- Catchment area: 549 km^{2} (212 mi^{2})
- Surface area: 23 km^{2} (9 mi^{2})

The Thenmala Dam also known as Parappar Dam is part of the largest irrigation project in Kerala, India. It is built along Kallada River in Kollam district of Kerala. The reservoir is used for irrigation and power generation.

The dam project started in the 1960s under the Kallada Irrigation and Tree Crop development project. The foundation stone of the dam was laid by T. K. Divakaran on 26 January 1972. It was completed in 1986 and was commissioned on 26 May 1986 by K. Karunakaran along with Kallada Irrigation Project. The reservoir is now a part of Thenmala Ecotourism Project.

== Location and Geography ==
The dam site is in the confluence of three major tributaries of Kallada River namely Kulathupuzha river which arises from various streams originating in Ponmudi hills, Parappar river which originates from streams originating on Windward side of Agasthyamala Biosphere Reserve and Shendurney river originating from streams near Aryankavu - Sengottai Pass. The gravity dam opens up to downstream that flow westward towards Punalur.

The dam is situated 65 km east of Kollam, 72 km north of Thiruvananthapuram and 39 km west of Tenkasi.

== Kallada Irrigation Project ==
The KIP Project (Kallada Irrigation and Tree Crop development project) started with an original cost of Rs. 13.28 crores. The revised estimate of project is Rs. 728 crores (at the 1999 schedule of rates) and made cost escalation to the tune of 5,356 percent. The ayacut targeted was 61,630 hectares (net) and 92,800 hectares (gross) but the achieved target was below 50,000 hectares Though the project was targeted for completion, and priority in allocation was given during the Ninth Plan, it could not be completed and commissioned fully.

== Thenmala Ecotourism ==
India's first planned Ecotourism was started around the reservoir in 1998. The ecotourism project uses reservoir as an ecotourism destination, with boating available, trekking and adventure activities on Shendurney Wildlife Sanctuary that surrounds the reservoir.

== See also ==
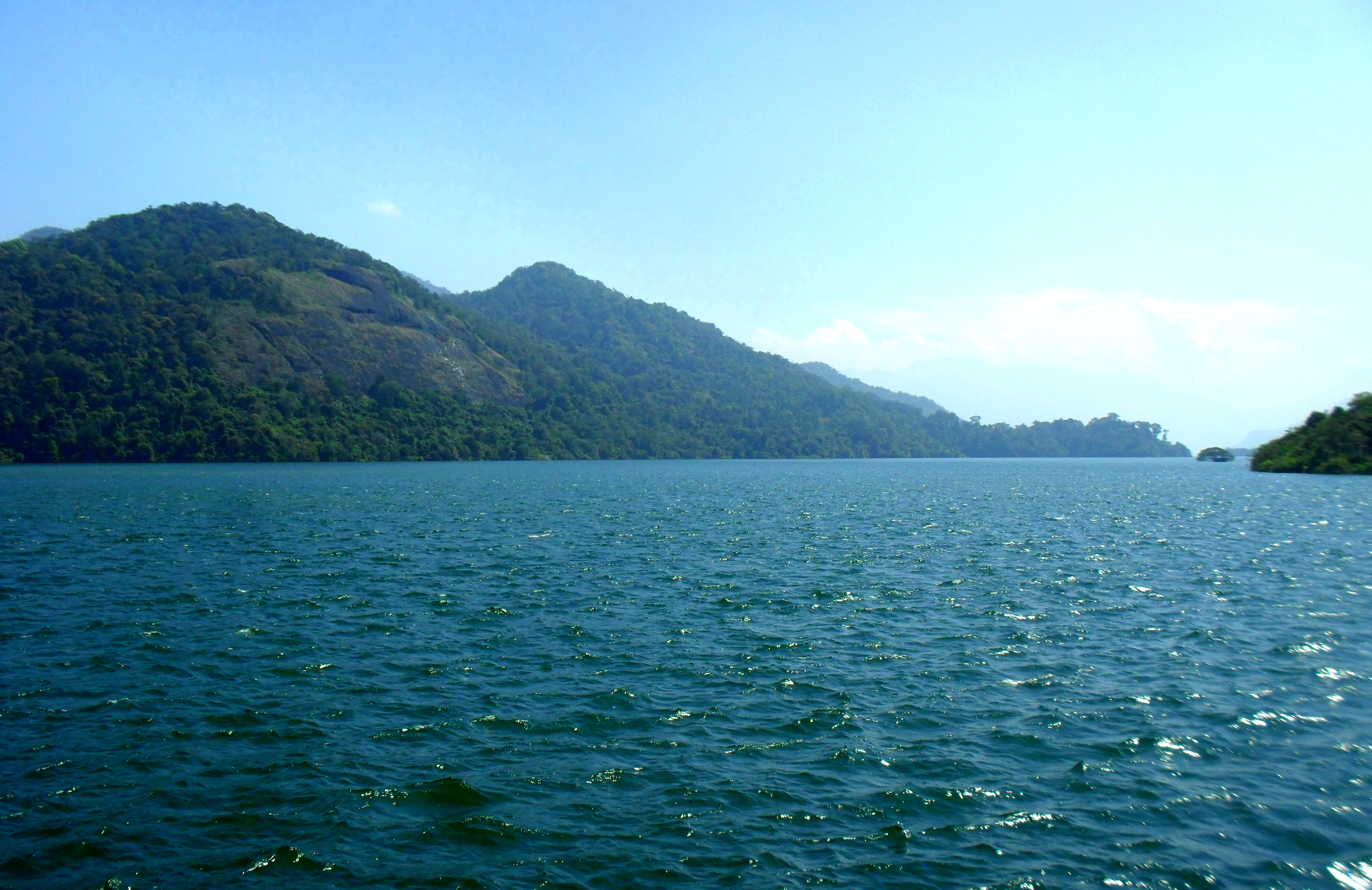
Reservoir of Thenmala Dam

- List of dams and reservoirs in India
- Palaruvi Falls
