= Kollam–Sengottai Chord Line =

Railway line in southern India

Kollam–Sengottai railway line
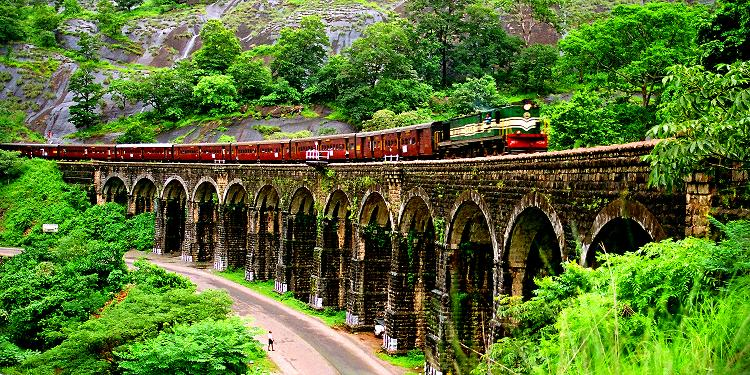
- Metre-gauge train passing through Thirteen Arch railway bridge

Overview
- Status: Active
- Owner: Indian Railways
- Locale: Kerala; Tamil Nadu
- Termini: Kollam Junction; Sengottai
- Stations: 17
- Website: www.sr.indianrailways.gov.in

Service
- Type: Express train Passenger train
- Services: 4 Express, 3 Passenger
- Route number: 63
- Operator: Southern Railway zone
- Depot(s): Kollam; Ernakulam; Golden Rock

History
- Opened: 26 November 1904; 121 years ago
- Closed: 2010; 16 years ago
- Reopened: 9 June 2018; 8 years ago

Technical
- Line length: 94.1 km (58.5 mi)
- Number of tracks: 1
- Track gauge: 1,676 mm (5 ft 6 in)
- Old gauge: 1,000 mm (3 ft 3 3/8 in)
- Loading gauge: 4,725 mm × 3,660 mm (15 ft 6.0 in × 12 ft 0.1 in) (BG)
- Electrification: Yes
- Operating speed: 100 km/h (62 mph)
- Highest elevation: 272 m (892 ft)

The Kollam–Sengottai railway line (formerly known as Quilon–Shencottah or Quilon–Chenkotta line) is part of Kollam-Chennai railway line in South India that connects Kollam Junction in Kerala state and Sengottai (also spelled Shencottah, Shenkottai, Chenkotta, Senkottai) in Tamil Nadu. The Quilon–Shencottah railway line was the first railway line in the erstwhile Travancore state and is more than a century old. The Kollam–Sengottai section is part of the Kollam–Chennai metre-gauge rail route commissioned by the British in 1904. The line has been completely converted to broad gauge and is now fully operational from Kollam Junction to Shengottai. It is going to be the important cargo transportation line connecting Vizhinjam container port and South Indian States.

== History ==
The Kollam–Sengottai metre-gauge line was conceived and implemented by Maharajah Uthram Thirunal of Travancore. It was built jointly by South Indian Railway Company, Travancore State and the Madras Presidency. After a survey in 1888, work started in 1900 and was completed by 1902. The first goods train travelled on this route in 1902 while the first passenger train began its run in 1904. Metre-gauge services were inaugurated on 1 July 1904 with the first passenger train flagged off from Kollam by Maharajah Moolam Thirunal of Travancore with a 21-gun salute. The railway line was constructed by the British in the foothills of the Western Ghats to transport forest products, spices and cashews from Kollam to Chennai, their southern headquarters.

=== Timeline ===
- 1888 Survey for Quilon-Madras rail started.
- 1899 - Survey for Quilon–Madras rail link completed
- 1900 - Works for Kollam–Sengottai metre-gauge railway line started to connect the city of Quilon with Madras
- 1902 - Kollam–Sengottai Railway line works completed
- 1904 - On 1 June, His Highness Moolam Thirunal Rama Varma of Travancore flagged off the first passenger train service on the Kollam–Sengottai railway line at Kollam railway station
- 1998 - Gauge conversion of Kollam–Sengottai Railway line officially started
- 2007 - On 1 May, rail services on Kollam–Punalur section withdrawn
- 2010 - On 10 May, Kollam–Punalur broad-gauge section thrown open for services
- 2018 - On 31 March, the entire Kollam–Sengottai line thrown open for passenger train services. The first passenger train on the stretch was Tambaram–Kollam–Tambaram special train service (06027/28) which completed the service by earning Rs 3.15 lakh as passenger ticket collection from its 879 passengers against a capacity of 712.
- 2022 - Electrification of Kollam - Punalur stretch completed.
- 2023 - Electrification of Punalur - Edamon stretch and Sengottai - Bhagavathipuram stretch completed.
- 2024 - On 31 March 2024 the pending electrification works between Edamon and Bhagavatipuram was completed. Thus the entire Kollam–Sengottai line is electrified. However the traction substation at Punalur was not yet ready. On 2024 July 28, the Palaruvi Express from Tirunelveli to Palakkad was the first electric train that passed through the route. The electric supply was obtained from Sengottai and Perinad traction substations. Currently all trains Including Ernakulam–Velankanni Express are running on electric traction. More trains like MEMU are expected to run through the route since electrification is completed.
- 2025 - On 18 October 2025 electric supply from KSEB reached newly constructed Punalur traction substation after delay of 2.5 years from their end. The Kollam - Chennai Egmore mail was the first train to run using the electric supply from Punalur TSS. The electric supply from Punalur TSS would energise the Kilikollur - Thenmala 70 km section. Thus the entire 761 km Kollam - Chennai route is electrified in all respects finally. This was a milestone in the 121 year old history of the route and would ensure seamless transportation experience along the ghat section.

== About the route ==
The route was once a lifeline for the people of the southern districts of Kerala state and the Sengottai–Virudhunagar belt of Tamil Nadu. It served to create a strong link especially among the trading community of these areas in the two States. British tea estates and coffee plantations thrived on the labour of tribesman living in the Thenmala forests and workers from Tamil Nadu. The railway line contributed much to the development of a plantation economy in this area. The farmers of the Shencottah-Virudhunagar belt depended on the trains to market their produce in south Travancore. Huge quantities of vegetables, groceries and dairy products such as curd were brought into Kollam district from Tamil Nadu by trains that plied the route. The Palaruvi and Kazhuthurutti waterfalls and the Thenmala eco-tourism centre are on the fringes of this line, and the Courtallam waterfalls at the destination make this route popular with nature lovers.

=== Notable landmarks on the route ===
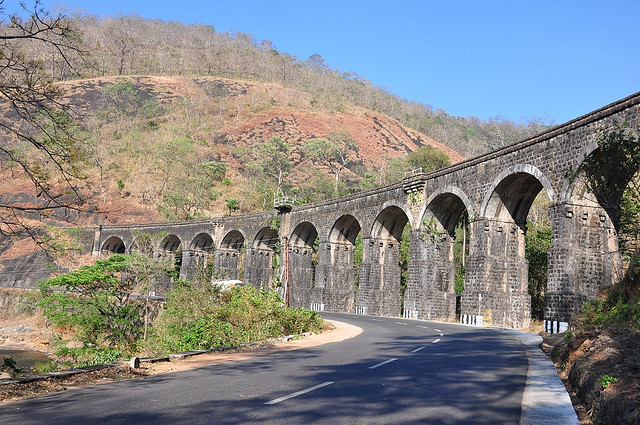
View of 13 Kannara Bridge

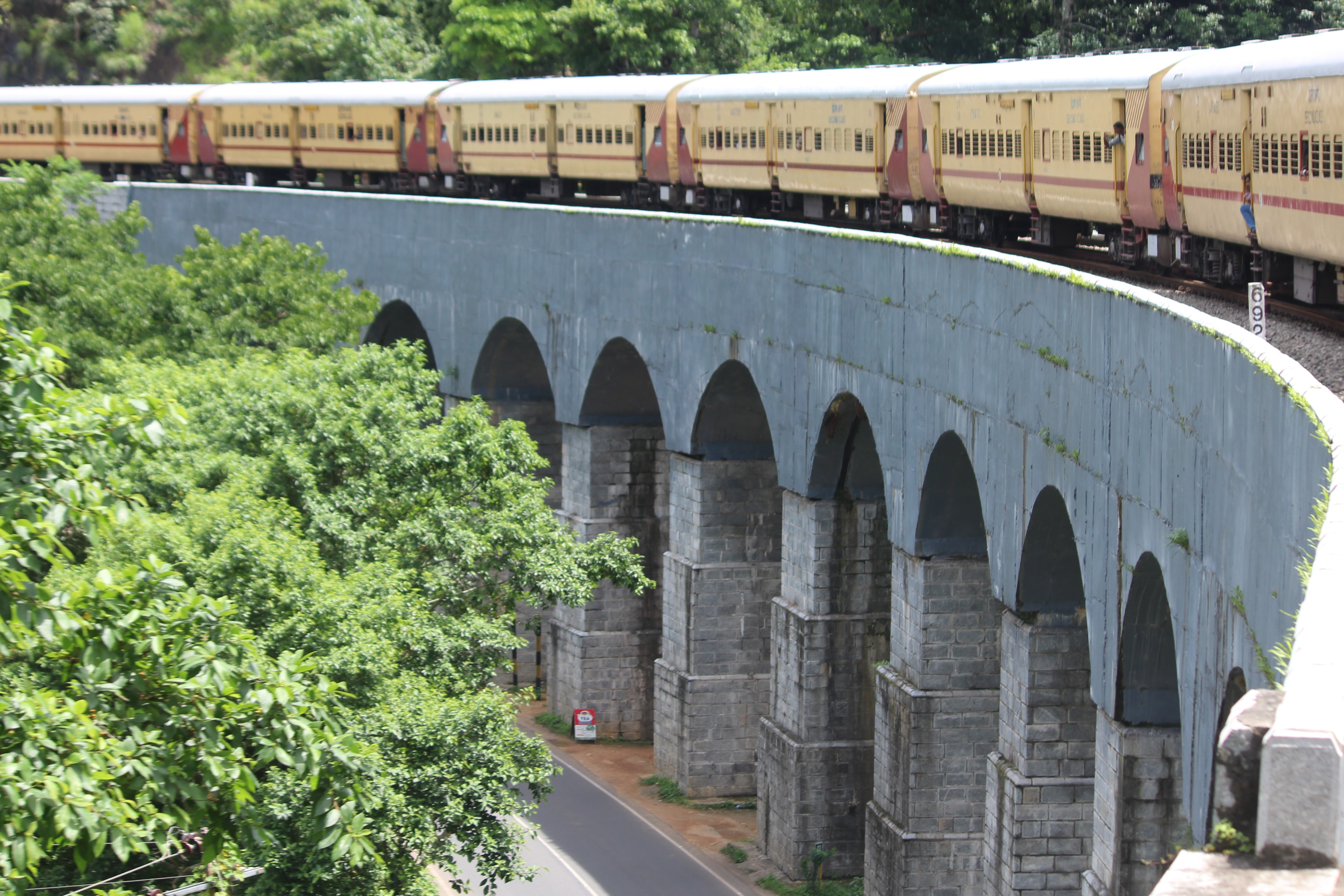
Train passing over 13 Kannara Bridge in 2022

- 13 Kannara Bridge

The Pathimoonnu Kannara Bridge or 13 Arch Bridge (Pathimoonu kannara palam) is a 108–year–old bridge at Kazhathuruthi. The bridge consists of 13 arches and is a major landmark on the Kollam–Sengottai railway line. The bridge connects two hillocks and stands on thirteen granite pillars each almost a hundred feet tall. Sandwiched by the Kollam-Thirumangalam National Highway on one side and the Kazhuthurutti river on the other, the bridge is 102.72 metres (337.0 ft) long and 5.18 metres (17.0 ft) tall.

- Aryankavu–Puliyara (Kottavasal) tunnel

The Aryankavu tunnel links Aryankavu in Kerala with Bhagavathipuram in Tamil Nadu. The tunnel was completed in 1903 and is 680 metres (2,230 ft) long. On both sides of the tunnel, the conch shell symbol of the Travancore rulers has been imprinted.

=== Popular metre-gauge trains on the route ===
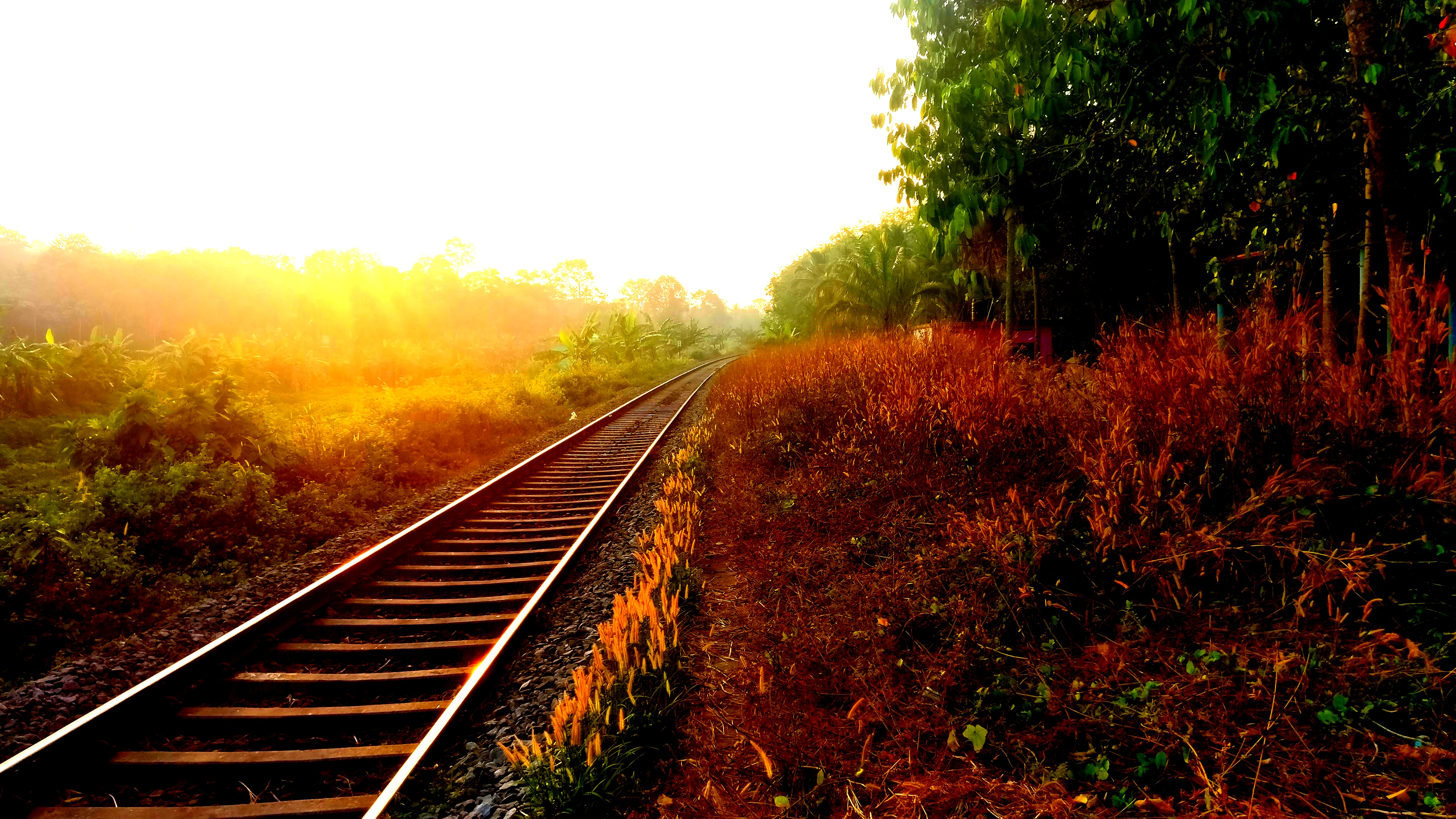
Rail line towards Kollam Junction near Kuri

- Train No:6105/6106 (earlier 105/106) Kollam–Chennai Egmore Mail

This train was introduced in 1904 after the completion of the Quilon–Sengottai–Virudhunagar metre-gauge line and was flagged off by the then Maharaja of Travancore, Moolam Thirunal. The train was later renamed the Quilon–Madras Mail. The train was extended to Trivandrum in 1918 after completion of the Quilon–Trivandrum metre-gauge line. This train was one of the early metre gauge trains to have a First Class. The train was truncated at Quilon after the Kollam–Trivandrum Central metre-gauge track was converted to broad gauge in 1979. The train went through to Madurai Junction railway station via Manamadurai Junction from 1996 when the Virudhunagar–Madurai line was converted to broad gauge. The train was discontinued in June 2000.

- Train No:6383/6384 Tirunelveli–Kollam Express
- Sengottai–Kollam passenger

This passenger train was the main means of transport among office workers and students along this route.

== Stations ==
The railway stations in Kollam Junction–Sengottai railway line are

- Kollam Junction
- Kilikollur
- Chandanattop
- Kundara
- Kundara East
- Ezhukone
- Kottarakara
- Kuri
- Avaneeswaram
- Punalur
- Edaman
- Ottakkal
- Thenmala
- Kazhuthurutty
- Edapalayam
- New Aryankavu
- Aryankavu
- Bhagavathipuram
- Sengottai

== Broad gauge conversion ==
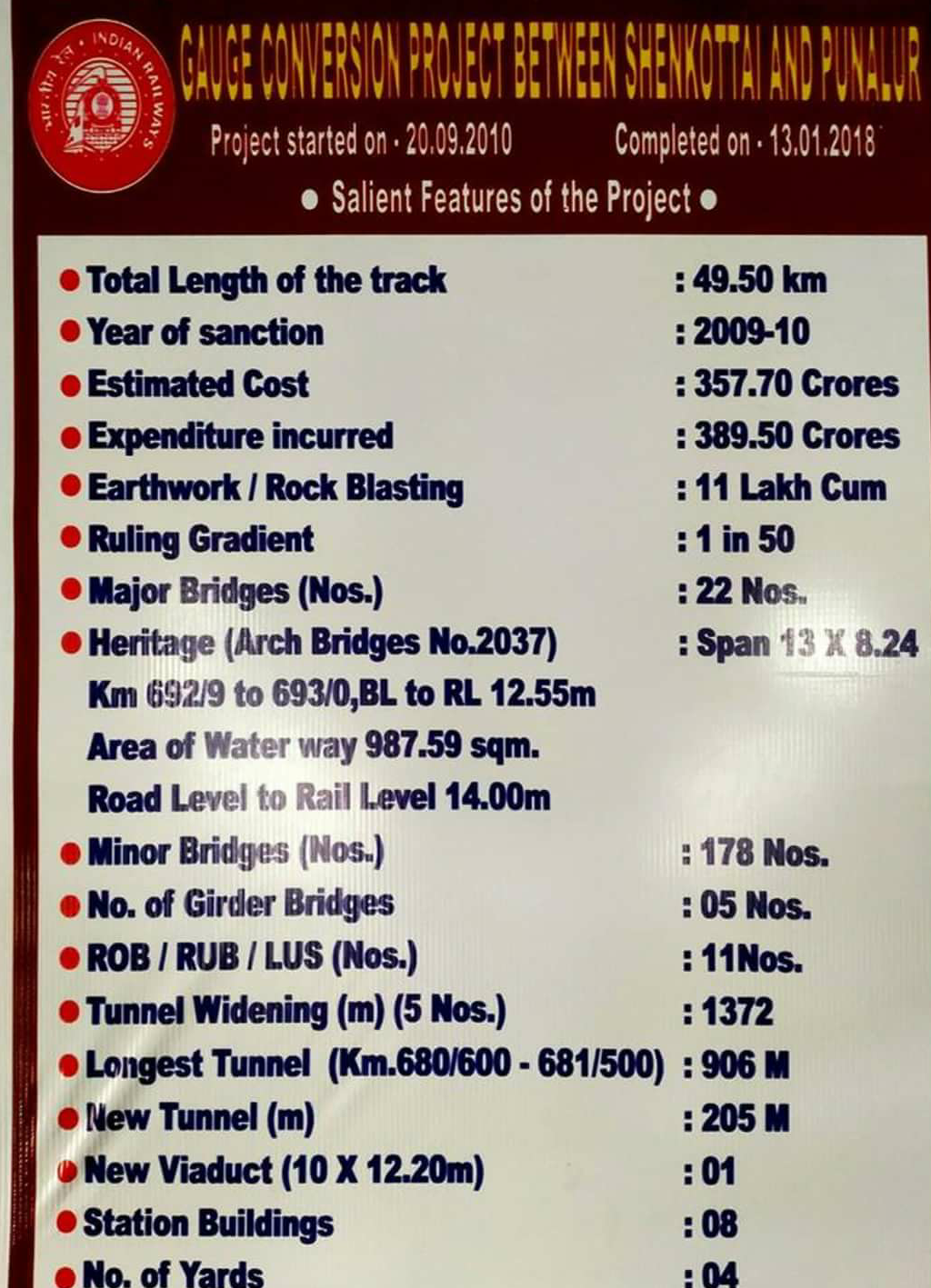

The Punalur–Sengottai section is part of the 325-km Kollam–Sengottai–Tenkasi–Tirunelveli–Tiruchendur broad gauge conversion project and part of the Tenkasi–Virudhunagar trunk route to Chennai. The broad gauge conversion section has been completed.

=== Kollam–Punalur section ===
The Kollam Junction–Punalur metre-gauge railway line to broad-gauge conversion works foundation stone was laid in 1998 at Punalur. Services on the Punalur–Kollam metre-gauge section were withdrawn on 1 May 2007, to facilitate the broad gauge conversion work. The gauge conversion took almost 11 years to complete after the foundation stone was laid. The 44 km line was converted to broad gauge and inaugurated on 10 May 2010. Passenger train services connecting Punalur to Kollam, Madurai, Guruvayur, Kanyakumari and Palakkad Junction are currently operational in this route.

=== Punalur–Sengottai section ===
To facilitate the broad gauge conversion work on the Punalur–Sengottai section, train services on the section were withdrawn in September 2010. The 49.2-km Punalur–Sengottai section gauge conversion works were completed in December 2017 and the line was commissioned in March 2018. The inaugural Tambaram–Kollam special train (06027) ran through the section on 31 March 2018. The inaugural TBM–QLN special train was later extended to Chennai Egmore (MS) and then regularised w.e.f. 04.03.2019 where the inaugural run of the regular daily express train was flagged off. The regular train is 115 years old and re-started after 19 years. The train MS<>QLN EXP has train numbers 16101 (MS–QLN)/16102 (QLN–MS). The inaugural special run of the regular train had 06101 as the number and had a total of 14 coaches with 8 SL coaches & 2 3A coaches.

== Major Trains ==
The major trains passing through this line are:

- Chennai Egmore–Kollam Junction Express (Quilon Mail)
- Ernakulam - Velankanni Express
- Palaruvi Express
- Guruvayur - Madurai Express

== Future Projects ==
- Improvements in track and track alignment is necessary to increase the speed and capacity of trains. Since Edamon-Bhagavathipuram stretch is a ghat section, currently trains with less number of bogies are moving at low speed with banker locos attached. The length of platforms at various stations are required to be increased to facilitate stoppage of long trains.
- The doubling of the line is necessary because the line is shortest path from Kollam to Chennai and cargos from upcoming Vizhinjam Port (Thiruvananthapuram) will be travelling through this line.
- Extensions of Sabari Railway Line:
1. The first phase of Sabari rail line is up to Erumely. As a second phase a railway line is proposed from Erumeli to Punalur. This facilitates the connection of Kollam- Sengottai line to Sabarimala, Pathanamthitta and to Ernakulam - Shornur line bypassing Kottayam, Alappuzha, Ernakulam.
2. Third phase extension from Punalur to Nemom / Balaramapuram (Proposed Vizhinjam port line starts from here). This railway line will act as bypass line to Kollam-Thiruvananthapuram line. This line is beneficial to people in the highrange region of Kollam and Thiruvananthapuram districts. Also this line will facilitate the cargo movement from Vizhinjam Port.

If both the above extensions happen Punalur railway station will become a major junction railway station in Kerala.

== See also ==
- Tenkasi Junction
- Tirunelveli Junction
- Kollam - Thiruvananthapuram line
- Ernakulam-Kayamkulam Coastal line
- Ernakulam–Kottayam–Kayamkulam line

Route map
