= Palaruvi =

Village in Kerala, India

Palaruvil is a tiny village in Kollam district, Kerala in South India. Palaruvi falls is situated in Palaruvi and Palaruvi is famous for Palaruvi waterfalls.
