= Palaruvi Falls =

Coordinates: 8°58′49″N 77°09′51″E

- Paalaruvi Waterfall
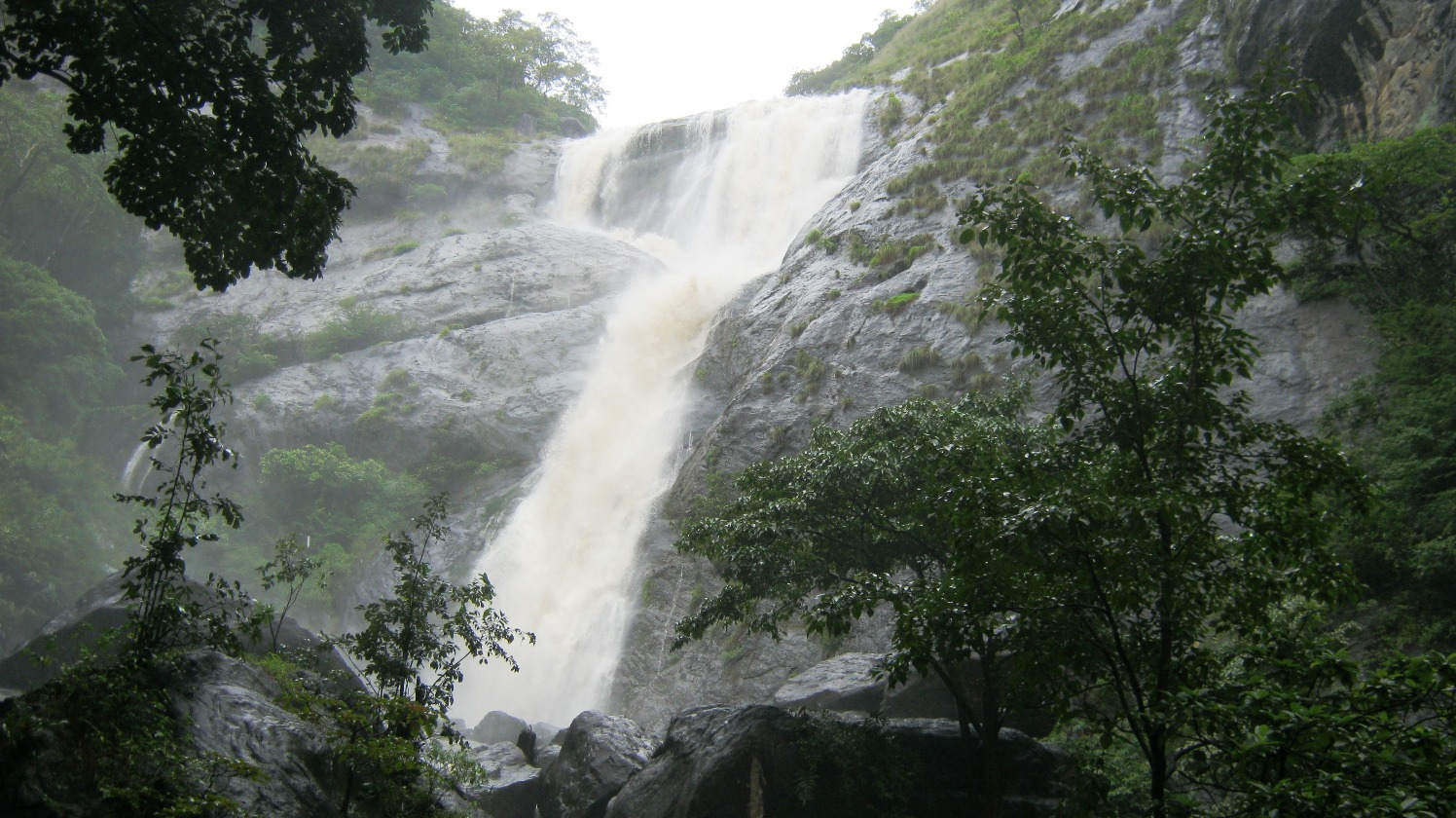
- Palaruvi Falls
- Interactive map of Palaruvi Falls
- Location: Aryankavu, Kollam district, Kerala, India
- Type: Horsetail
- Total height: 91 metres (299 ft)
- Number of drops: 1
- Watercourse: Kallada River

Palaruvi Falls is a waterfall located in Kollam district in the Indian state of Kerala. It is the 32nd highest waterfall in India.

Palaruvi (literally "stream of milk") falls from a height of 300 feet (91 m) and is situated at Aryankavu in the Kollam district of the south Indian state of Kerala.

== See also ==
- Kumbhavurutty Waterfall
- Manalar Waterfall
- Oliyarik Waterfall
- List of waterfalls in India
- List of waterfalls in India by height
