= Thenmala =

Thenmala Tenmala
- Village
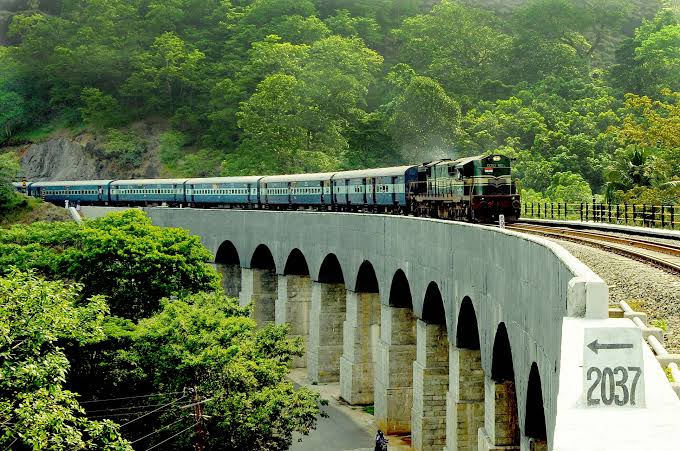
- 13 Kannara railway bridge in Thenmala

- Location in Kerala, India Thenmala (India)
- Coordinates: 8°57′0″N 77°4′0″E
- Country: India
- State: Kerala
- District: Kollam

Languages
  - Official: Malayalam, English
- Time zone: UTC+5:30 (IST)
- Vehicle registration: KL-25
- Nearest city: Kollam (63 km)

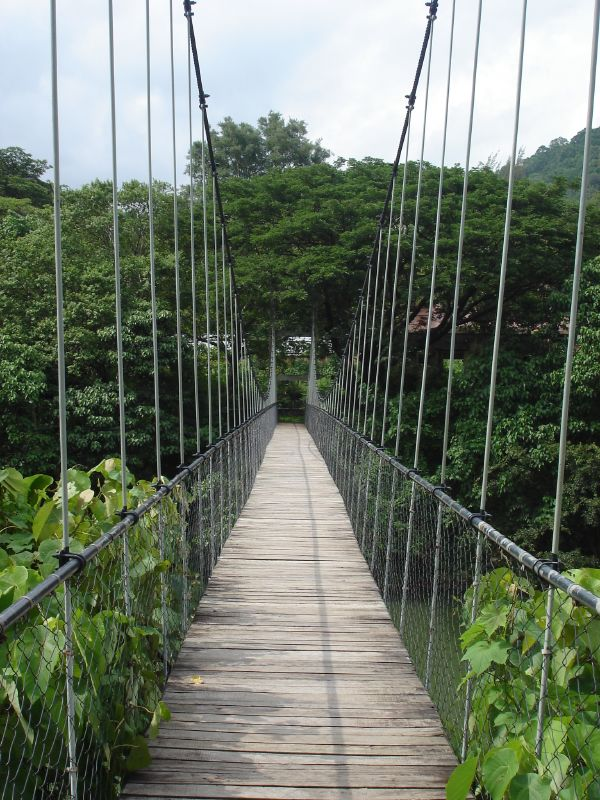
Suspension Bridge

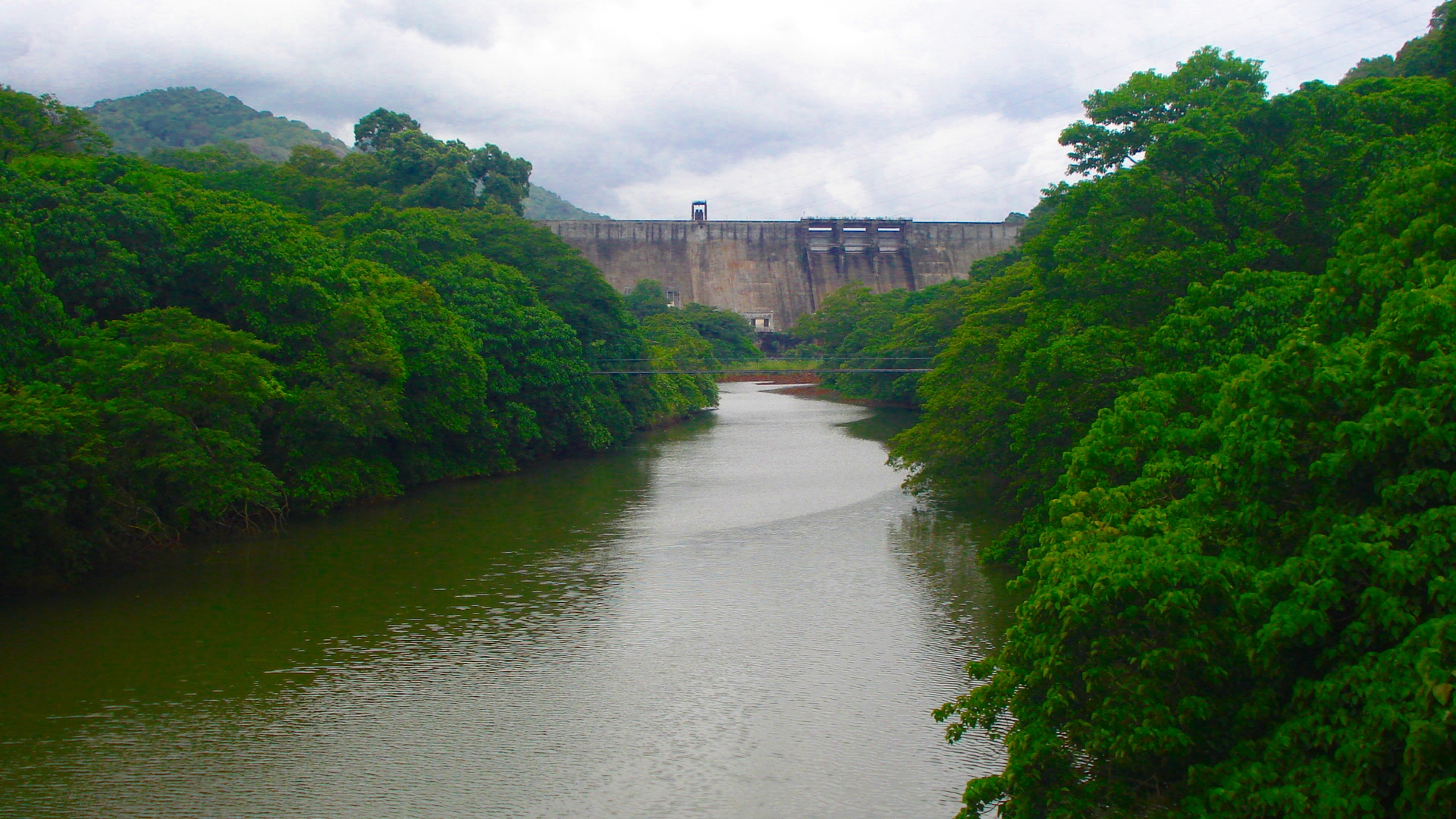
Parappar dam

Thenmala is a tourist destination on the eastern side of Kollam district in Kerala, India. It is home to the first ecotourism centre in India. The word 'Thenmala' means "Honey hill" in the Malayalam language. It is known for its high-quality honey export. The town is 66 km away from Kollam city, 69 km from the state capital, Trivandrum and is just 14 km away from the Tamil Nadu state border. The interstate National Highway 744, connecting Kollam with Madurai in Tamil Nadu, and State Highway 2 of Kerala are passing through Thenmala.

== Etymology ==
Thenmala is derived from Malayalam word "thēn" means nectar/honey and "mala" means mountain. Thenmala was the shooting location for several Malayalam and Tamil films including Adiverukal (1986).

== Tourism ==
Thenmala attracts foreign and domestic tourists with a host of attractions including boating on the lake, a rope bridge, trekking, mountaineering, biking and a musical fountain. Thenmala is approachable both from Trivandrum and Punalur by road. The nearest railway station is Thenmala. Kollam-QLN and Sengottai railway station is better connected nationally. The waterfall called Palaruvi is a prime attraction nearby. Also nearby is a deer rehabilitation center where visitors can see deer in a forest setting and have a peep into a traditional tree house used by forest dwellers to escape harm from wild animals.

== Attractions ==
=== Eco-tourism ===
Thenmala is the first planned eco-tourism destination in India. The Thenmala Dam is an ecotourism destination in Kerala. The Dam, which impounds the largest reservoir in the state which was built under the Kallada Irrigation and Tree Crop development project. The construction of the Parappara Dam across the confluence of the Chenduruney, Kazhuthurutty and Kulathupuzha rivers has resulted in the creation of an artificial lake of about 26 Sq. km. which spreads along the middle of the Shendurney Wildlife Sanctuary. It is the largest irrigation project in Kerala.

=== Butterfly Safari ===
The Butterfly Safari Park at Thenmala Ecotourism is Recognized as "Asia's First Butterfly Safari Park" making it one of the major landmark in Thenmala.The Park Inhabits About 125 Species of Butterflies, including the Autumn Leaf Butterfly, which endemic to Suthern Western Ghats.The park was established in 2001 along with the formation of TEPS(Thenmala Ecotourism Promotion Society).

=== Other Landmarks ===
Kulathupuzha Sastha temple, Anchal Pinnacle view point, Kudukkathu para, Punalur suspension bridge. Thenmala is 72 km from Thiruvananthapuram and 16 km from Palaruvi Falls.
