= Valiyode =

Coordinates: 8.9222°N 76.7969°E

- village
- Interactive map of Valiyode
- Country: India
- State: Kerala
- District: Kollam

Languages
  - Official: Malayalam, English
- Time zone: UTC+5:30 (IST)
- PIN: 691520
- Vehicle registration: KL-24

Valiyode is a village in Kollam district, Kerala state, India. It is also the first Ward of the Elamad Grama Panchayat in Kottarakkara Tehsil.

== Location ==
Valliyode is located on the Oyoor-Vappala route, bordering with Veliyam Grama Panchayat. It is situated 29 kilometers from Kollam, located at 76.75 °E 9.00 °N, 30 meters above sea level. It is a hilly area with a population of up to 1623 people. Along with Anganvadis, SRVUPS school is in this village. There are some beautiful temples and churches. Some of the famous temples are Chavarumurthi Temple, Kilikkodu, Aayiravalli Temple, Purambil and Thannettu kaavu. The Valiyode Marthoma Church is 2 km away on the way to Ambalamkunnu.

== Economy ==
The main agricultural products of surrounding areas are Rubber, Black pepper, Cashew, Honey, Tapioca, Bananas and other spices.

Most people are part of animal husbandry.

== Nearby places ==
Some of the famous nearby places are Kottarakara 12 km, Odanavattom 5 km, Oyoor 8 km, Kottiyam 20 km, Chathannoor 17 km, Anchal 23 km, Kulathupuzha and Punalur 30 km.

== Religion ==
The majority of the population belongs to the Hindu religion(75%). This village also has a sizable Christian population(25%). Among Hindus, the Ezhava caste forms the dominant community with 80% of Hindus. The rest are Viswakarmas(5%), Harijan(10%). Others form 5%.
