= Kottarakkara Assembly constituency =

Constituency of the Kerala legislative assembly in India

Kottarakkara
- Constituency No. 119 for the Kerala Legislative Assembly
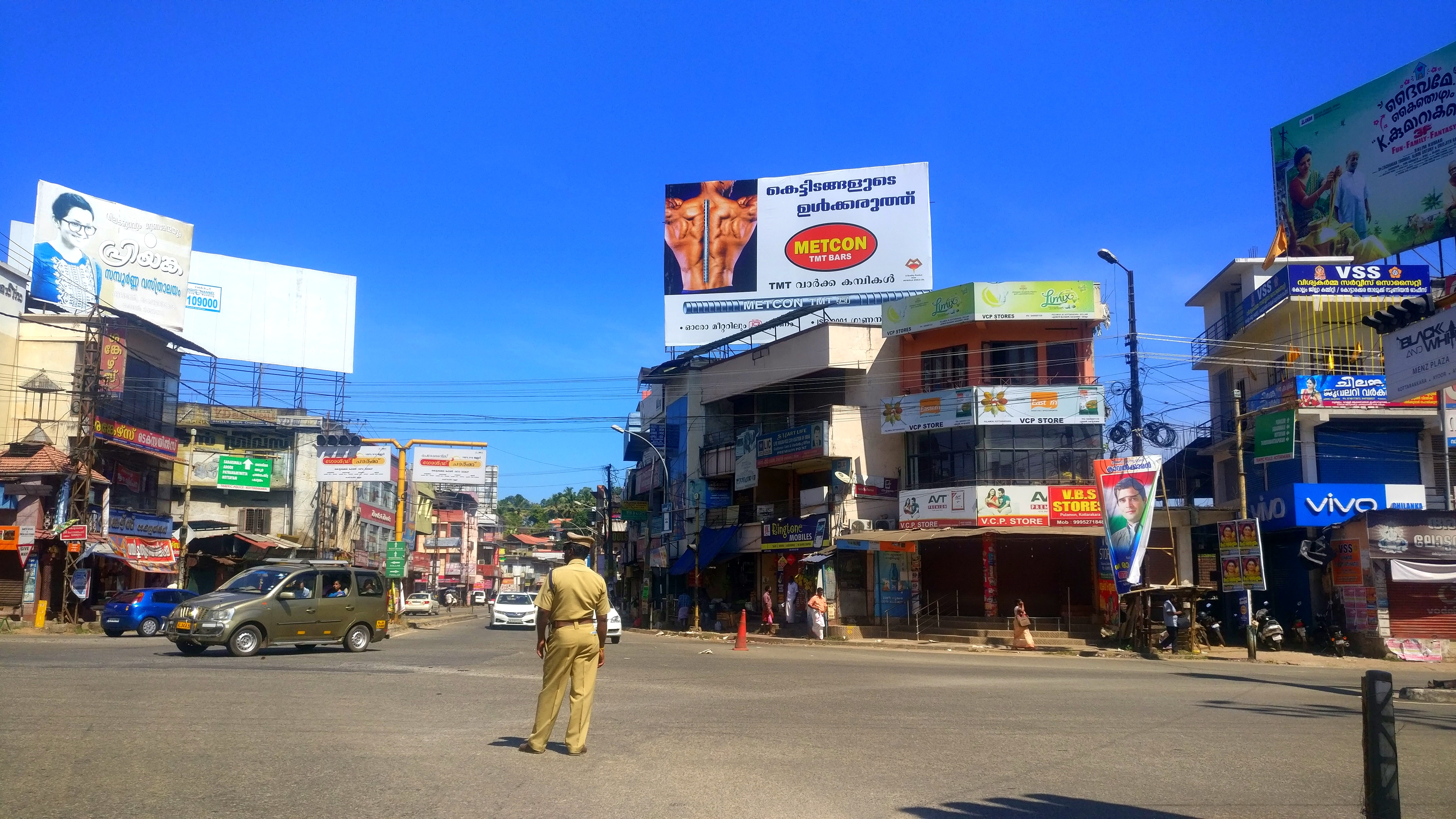
- Pulamon Junction in Kottarakara town

Constituency details
- Country: India
- Region: South India
- State: Kerala
- District: Kollam
- Established: 1957
- Total electors: 2,00,586 (2016)
- Reservation: None

Member of Legislative Assembly
- 16th Kerala Legislative Assembly
- Incumbent K. N. Balagopal
- Party: CPI(M)
- Alliance: LDF
- Elected year: 2026

Kottarakara or Kottarakkara is a legislative assembly constituency in Kollam district of Kerala, India. It is one among the 11 assembly constituencies in Kollam district. As of the 2026 assembly elections, the current MLA is K N Balagopal of CPI(M).

== Structure ==
As per the recent changes on Assembly constituency delimitations, Kottarakara Assembly constituency consists of the municipality of Kottarakkara and seven neighbouring panchayaths including Ezhukone, Kareepra, Kulakkada, Mylom, Neduvathoor, Veliyam and Ummannoor.

- Municipalities: Kottarakara
- Panchayaths: Ezhukone, Kareepra, Kulakkada, Mylom, Neduvathoor, Ummannoor, Veliyam
- Neighbourhood towns: Thrikkannamangal, Kunnicode, Valakom, Odanavattam

== Electoral history ==
=== Travancore-Cochin Legislative Assembly Elections ===
Year	Winner	Party	Vote Margin	Coalition
1951	Krishnan Nair	Socialist	3,526	NA
1954	B. B. Pandarathil	RSP	6,586	LDF

== Members of Legislative Assembly ==
The following list contains all members of Kerala Legislative Assembly who have represented the constituency:

Election	Niyama Sabha	Member	Party	Tenure
1957	1st	E. Chandrasekharan Nair	CPI	1957–1960
1960	2nd	D. Damodaran Potti	PSP	1960–1965
1967	3rd	E. Chandrasekharan Nair	CPI	1967–1970
1970*	3rd	C. Achutha Menon	CPI	1970
1970	4th	Kottara Gopalakrishnan	INC	1970–1977
1977	5th	R. Balakrishna Pillai	KEC	1977–1980
1980	6th	R. Balakrishna Pillai	KEC	1980–1982
1982	7th	R. Balakrishna Pillai	KEC	1982–1987
1987	8th	R. Balakrishna Pillai	KEC	1987–1991
1991	9th	R. Balakrishna Pillai	INC	1991–1996
1996	10th	R. Balakrishna Pillai	KC(B)	1996–2001
2001	11th	R. Balakrishna Pillai	KC(B)	2001–2006
2006	12th	P. Aisha Potty	CPI(M)	2006–2011
2011	13th	P. Aisha Potty	CPI(M)	2011–2016
2016	14th	P. Aisha Potty	CPI(M)	2016-2021
2021	15th	K. N. Balagopal	CPI(M)	2021-2026
2026	16th	K. N. Balagopal	CPI(M)	2026-

*by-election

== Election results ==
Percentage change (±%) denotes the change in the number of votes from the immediate previous election.

=== 2026 ===
2026 Kerala Legislative Assembly election: Kottarakkara
Party	Candidate	Votes	%	±%
CPI(M)	K. N. Balagopal	63,926	42.95	▼3.03
INC	P. Aisha Potty	62,914	42.27	▲3.52
BJP	R. Reshmi	20,664	13.88	▼0.31
NOTA	None of the above	611	0.41	▲0.03
Margin of victory		1,012	0.68	▼6.55
Turnout		1,48,854		
CPI(M) hold		Swing		

=== 2021 ===
There were 2,00,587 registered voters in the constituency for the 2021 Kerala Assembly election.

2021 Kerala Legislative Assembly election: Kottarakkara
Party	Candidate	Votes	%	±%
CPI(M)	K. N. Balagopal	68,770	45.98	▼9.46
INC	R. Resmi	57,956	38.75	▲11.64
BJP	Vayakkal Soman	21,223	14.19	▼1.80
NOTA	None of the above	574	0.38	
Independent	Mathews K. Lukose	136	0.09	−
Independent	Lal Viswan	103	0.07	
Margin of victory		10,814	7.23	▼21.10
Turnout		1,49,552	74.56	▼0.48
CPI(M) hold		Swing	▼9.46	

=== 2016 ===
There were 2,00,527 registered voters in the constituency for the 2016 Kerala Assembly election.

2016 Kerala Legislative Assembly election: Kottarakkara
Party	Candidate	Votes	%	±%
CPI(M)	P. Aisha Potty	83,443	55.44	▲1.55
INC	Savin Sathyan	40,811	27.11	
BJP	Rajeshwary Rajendran	24,062	15.99	▲11.36
NOTA	None of the above	742	0.49	
Independent	Madhu B.	491	0.33	−
BSP	R. Sukumaran	386	0.26	▼0.40
SS	Veliyam Shaji	325	0.22	
Independent	Hariprasad	173	0.11	
Independent	Ajaykumar Thankappan	80	0.05	
Margin of victory		42,632	28.33	▲13.35
Turnout		1,50,513	75.04	▲0.72
CPI(M) hold		Swing	▲1.55	

=== 2011 ===
There were 1,84,97 registered voters in the constituency for the 2011 election.

2011 Kerala Legislative Assembly election: Kottarakkara
Party	Candidate	Votes	%	±%
CPI(M)	P. Aisha Potty	74,069	53.89	
KC(B)	N. M. Murali	53,477	38.91	
BJP	Vayakkal Madhu	6,370	4.63	
Independent	Dhaneshlal Panavely	1,063	0.77	
BSP	P. T. Prasanna Kumar	911	0.66	
Independent	S. Solomon	773	0.56	−
Independent	Prakash V.	454	0.33	
Independent	Prakash R.	320	0.23	
Margin of victory		20,592	14.98	
Turnout		1,37,437	74.32	
CPI(M) gain from KC(B)		Swing		
