= Perumkulam =

- village
- Location in Kerala, India Perumkulam (India)
- Coordinates: 8.705244°N 76.786133°E
- Country: India
- State: Kerala
- District: Kollam
- Taluk: Kottarakara Taluk

Government
  - Body: Gram panchayat

Population (2011)
  - Total: 19,202

Languages
  - Official: Malayalam, English
- Time zone: UTC+5:30 (IST)
- PIN: 691566
- Vehicle registration: KL-

Perumkulam is a village in the Kollam district of Kerala, India. It is India's second and Kerala's first 'village of books'. The village received this recognition on 19 June 2020.

== Location ==
Perumkulam (Pusthakagramam) village is situated in Kulakkada Panchayath along Kottarakkara - Mannady (Dalawa road) road 6 km away from Kottarakkara town and 3 km away from Inchakkad on Main Central Road. 5 km away from Kottarakkara Sree Mahaganapathi Kshethram. The nearest railway station is Kottarakara railway station.

== Demographics ==
As of 2011 India census, Perumkulam had a population of 19202 with 9337 males and 9865 females.

== See also ==
- Bhilar
- Pustakanch Gaav
