= Roaduvila =

Tourism place in Kollam, Kerala

Roaduvila റോഡുവിള Roadvila
- village
- Location in Kerala, India Roaduvila (India)
- Coordinates: 8.8883°N 76.8150°E
- Country: India
- State: Kerala
- District: Kollam

Languages
  - Official: Malayalam, English
- Time zone: UTC+5:30 (IST)
- PIN: 691516
- Telephone code: +91 474 2xxxxxx
- Vehicle registration: KL-24-XXXX

Roaduvila (also spelled "Roadvila") is a place located in Cheriyavelinallur, Karingannoor area of Velinalloor Panchayat village in the Kottarakara Taluk, Kollam District of Kerala, India. It is situated on the banks of the Ithikkara River. Post Office of Roaduvila is CHERIYAVELINALLOOR, comes under Pincode 691516. The Ayoor- Ithikkara road passes through this place. This place is 7 kilometers from Ayoor junction, and 28 kilometers from Kollam railway station.

== Landmarks ==
The main centers of public activity in Roaduvila consist of an Engineering college, an architecture college, a Bus stand, a Petrol Pump, a primary health center (PHC), lower and upper primary schools, higher secondary school, a market, a village administrative office, a post office, a temple, Mosques, and Christian churches.

== Education ==
Travancore Engineering College Roaduvila Government L.P.School Roaduvila Higher Secondary School, K.P.M, HIGHER SECONDARY SCHOOL, Nizar Rahim and Mark School of Architecture, Kollam
