= Panaveli =

Panavely
- Village
- Location within Kerala
- Coordinates: 9.0927°N 76.8612°E
- Country: India
- State: Kerala
- District: Kollam
- Taluk: Kottarakkara

Languages
  - Official: Malayalam
- Time zone: UTC+5:30 (IST)
- PIN: 691532
- Telephone code: 0474
- Vehicle registration: KL-24
- Nearest city: Kottarakara
- Lok Sabha constituency: Mavelikara
- Assembly constituency: Pathanapuram
- Literacy: 93.63%

Panavely is a village situated near Kottarakkara in Kollam District, Kerala state, India.

== Politics ==
Panaveli is a part of PATHANAPURAM assembly constituency in Mavelikkara (Lok Sabha constituency). Sri KB GANESH KUMAR is the current MLA of PATHANAPURAM. Shri.Kodikkunnil Suresh is the current member of parliament of Mavelikkara. Panavei is a part of Vettikkavala panchayat and part of Vettikkavala Block Panchayat. CPM, INC, CPI, BJP, KC(B) etc. are the major political parties.

== Geography ==
Panaveli is a small village near Kottarakkara.
