= Ampalamkunnu =

Ambalamkunnu
- town
- Location in Kerala, India
- Coordinates: 8°54′N 76°47′E
- Country: India
- State: Kerala
- District: Kollam
- Elevation: 30 m (98 ft)

Languages
  - Official: Malayalam, English
- Time zone: UTC+5:30 (IST)
- PIN: 691537
- Telephone code: 0474
- Vehicle registration: KL-24
- Nearest city: Kottarakara

Ambalamkunnu, also spelled as Ampalamkunnu, is a small temple town in the Indian state of Kerala. It is situated 25 kilometers from Kollam, located at 76.90 °E 9.00 °N. It's a hilly area and houses a large number of temples.

Some of the temples are: Valiya Vila Bhagavathy temple, Nettayam Indilayappa swami temple, Meeyanakkavu Devi temple, Kayila Madan Kavu, Cheruvakkal Dharma Saastha temple, Vaaliyode Madan temple, Nelliparampu Sreekrishna Swami temple.

Some of the nearby places are Kottarakara, Roaduvila, Odanavattom, Oyoor, Kottiyam, Chathannoor Anchal, Kulathupuzha, Pooyapally, Veliyam and Punalur.

The main agricultural products of surrounding areas are rubber, rice, wheat black pepper and other spices.

The Ambalamkunnu bend on the NC road has seen many accidents and the residents have requested adequate safety measures.

== Religion ==
The majority of the population belongs to the Hindu religion(60%). The town also has a sizeable Muslim(30%) population and the Christian population is around 10%. Among Hindus, Ezhava caste forms the dominant community with 60% of Hindus. The rest are Nairs(17%), Viswakarmas(5%), Dalit(15%). Others form 3%.

== Festivals ==
The famous festival here is Onam. It's celebrated by all people regardless of their caste and religion. The main festivals among Hindus are Deepavali, vishu and the Karthika festival. Muslims celebrate Valiya Perunnal, Cheriya Perunnal and Nabi Jayanthi. Christmas is celebrated not only by Christians but also by some sections of Hindus too.
