= Sadhu Kochoonju Upadesi =

Indian Christian leader (1883–1945)

Muthampakkal "Sadhu" Kochkunju Upadesi
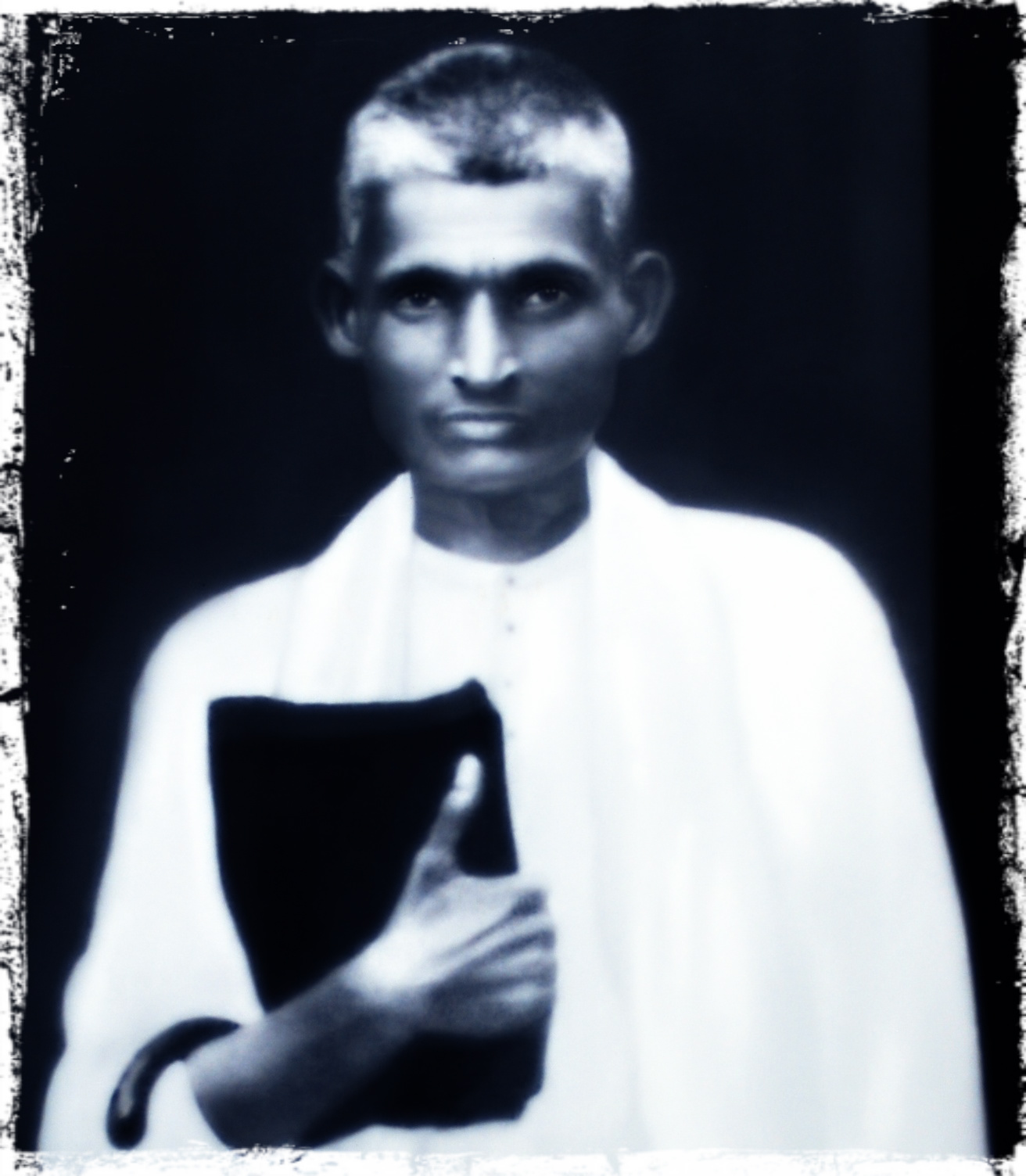
- Born: M. I. Varghese; 1883; Edayaranmula. near Aranmula, Travancore
- Died: 30 November 1945 (aged 61–62)
- Resting place: Laka St Thom Marthoma Church, Edayaranmula
- Other names: Kochukunju, Kochoonju
- Occupation: Missionary
- Known for: Christian poet, composer
- Spouse: Aleyama
- Parent(s): Itty and Mariamma

Sadhu Kochoonju Upadesi (born Moothampackal Itty Varughese) (1883 – 30 November 1945) was a famous Malayali Christian preacher, poet and composer. Kochoonju was a very distinctive person in appearance. He always wore a white shirt and white dothi. He was about 175 cm tall and had very thin and frail body. His eyes appeared to be piercing and his forehead was frowned as if brooding yet with a childlike impression. He always carried an umbrella and his Bible wherever he went. His saintly life, self-control, self-denial, and commitment towards social issues made him a unique person. He liked to spend time alone with Bible, to him the Bible was not a book to be read but an instruction book which should be followed in day-to-day life. Much of his time he spent in reading.

During his lifetime he was known as Kochoonju which was a contraction of the two Malayalam words Kochu and Kunju. Malayalam equivalent of a preacher is Upadesi. During his missionary work in Tamil Nadu, India, they called him Sadhu meaning, holy man. Thus he came to be known as Sadhu Kochkunju Upadesi.

== Birth and family life ==
M. I. Varughese was born on 29 November 1883 to Itty of Moothampackal and his wife Mariamma of Perangattu Padickal, in Edayaranmula, a small village near Aranmula in Pathanamthitta District, Kerala.

His parents called him Kochoonju and he was a member of a large family of six sisters. He had a brother, who died at the age of two.

As Sadhu Kochkunju Upadeshi lived at a time when child marriage was an accepted custom, Kochkunju was married at 12 years of age. His wife's name was Aleyamma. She provided the support that Kochkunju needed. He made ends meet by working as a farmer and selling the products of the field.

== Education and early life ==
He joined a nearby Mar Thoma Lower Primary school. In 1895 when he was only 12, he married Aleyamma, Vattapara, Kurianoor who was from a nearby village. For this his classmates ridiculed him and so he left that school and joined an English medium school. While he was there one of the teachers punished him for no reason and so Kochoonju wrote a poem ridiculing him. That was his first attempt in writing poems. He was an intelligent student and was top in the class. When he was 14 years of age he stopped his formal education to help his father in farming.

His mother died in 1898 when he was 15. That was a terrible blow to his father who was already sick. His father died in 1903 when he was 20, leaving a small piece of land and some loan. Income from the agriculture was not at all sufficient for their living. So he had a hard life and was forced to do many small jobs to make both ends meet. He did textile business, and for some time he taught in a school. His wife's parents were very helpful. Finally he settled as a farmer.

== Beginning of the ministry ==
Sadhu Kochkunju Upadesi at the age of 11 accepted Jesus as his personal saviour during a meeting held in his home parish. He decided to commit himself to the ministry at the age of 17. In the beginning he went to spread the gospel at night time after farming. When the Kerala Brethren movement gained momentum, Sadhu Kochoonju Upadesi decided not to join that church even though his friend and classmate K. V. Simon (later Mahakavi, poet laureate) who was also a paternal cousin of his wife's father joined the movement. He said that even though he agreed with their doctrine, he felt that his mission was to stay with the church he was and to preach the gospel. He claimed the source of his livelihood was prayer, which he used to spend many hours in daily.

== Organizations and institutions ==
From the very beginning he organized Sunday Schools and Prayer Groups in his village. His parish priest Rev K. V. Jacob and his classmate Mahakavi K. V. Simon strongly supported him. Together they formed Edayarmula Christian Fellowship (ECF), Youth league, Christian Care Units.

He believed that faith without action is dead. So later in life he gave leadership for the formation of organizations like the YMCA, the Anti dowry movement, the Free School for the Poor Children, Bible School to train evangelists and a prayer hall for conducting meetings and also as a guest house for traveling evangelists on the Kozhencherry – Chengannur roadside.

At Kalayapuram near Kottarakara he started Bible study classes and open air meetings where people gathered to hear his messages. People at these meetings wore white dresses showing respect to him.

== The ministry ==
Sadhu Kochoonju Upadesi was the source of many missionary movements in Kerala. He travelled all over Kerala, South India and Sri Lanka to preach the Gospel. He had a habit of trusting in God for all of his needs. He spend hours in prayer as he sought guidance from God. His major method of spreading the gospel was by speaking in large gatherings. He did about 30 years of intensive gospel work. This is an indication of his commitment. He not only spoke of spiritual things, but also talked about social issues which attribute to loose morale and religious right.

The speeches of Sadhu Kochoonju Upadesi was enjoyed by the old and young alike. He used a wide range of stories, examples, experiences and humour liberally throughout his messages to add colour to his speeches. He was very inclined to people experience a born again warmth than bored again. He incorporated his own composed songs in these gatherings, which later made his revised hymns popular. So the ministry of Sadhu Kochoonju Upadesi had great results in Kerala and South India. The results were that many came to hear what he had to say and accepted Christ as their saviour in this meetings. It wasn't an unusual thing to see drunkards coming to his meetings and going back as new men. Most of these conversions were genuine and those who came to Christ shared their understanding of faith with their friends and family. Thus the ministry of Kochoonju was a great success. His modus operandi brought revival to many parts of South India which opened the doors to many future Christian missions.

In 1915 then Mar Thoma Metropolitan gave him the authorization to preach and to do gospel work in all the Parishes of the Church. In 1930s he had a very hectic schedule and at regular intervals conducted parish conventions from Thursday to Sunday. The rest of the days he dedicated to reading books and prayer.

== Lifestyle and principles ==
Sadhu Kochoonju Upadesi was a headstrong individual, He believed requirement of lifestyle for being a good gospel bearer. So he set a standard or set of strict principles for himself, and lived accordingly as he believed. Following are the principles he strived to achieve:-

- He decided to end companionship with women and that he would have no more children because he considered that, his given children were enough. This was a trend which was rare-common among ascetically religious Nambudiri Brahmans.
- Spent much of his time reading to increase the depth of his knowledge about God and the word of God and meditated on such associated ideologies.
- Regulated his eating routines; he had little food everyday and also fasted regularly, he took the literal meaning of verses like JOHN 6:51 and to avoid the morbid sins as gluttony, this willful standard caused many ailments in the later part of his life.
- Materialistic things were minimized and mere essentials were only kept and gathered; to be more focused on his Christian commitment and to avoid avarice.
- He considered Gospel work as his responsibility and for which he was not willing to take any remuneration or salary.
- Decided not to adopt-use any embellishments which would distract; He adopted this in his dress-code and only wore white clothes which he considered decent and modest.
- He thought that any form of hedonism was forbidden and shielded himself from all worldly enjoyment.
- He was very careful and compulsive to exercise humility and yearned for no deferential respect, because to him all men and women were equal in God's eyes and he believed any form of respect and adoration was to be directed to God.
- He set a principle to never think or consider of himself as above or smarter than others. To him vanity, competitiveness and snobbery was an act of a deadly sin, Pride and wrong in the eyes of God. Kochoonju believed in strengthening people through prayer and guidance & considered talents developed as gifts by the grace of God, that should be used for the common good and not for brewing bitterness.
- He was cautious from his experience in business background and striven towards higher Christian ideals.

== Other activities ==
Kochoonju Upadesi was the General Secretary of the Mar Thoma Voluntary Evangelists' Association from 1924 to 1945. He was also the Manager of the Edayaranmula English Middle school for some time.

== Literary works ==
Parama Christanithwm, Paramanentha Kristya Jeevitham. (Joyful Christian life), etc. are some of his many books published.

But the most appreciated work was his many Christian devotional songs that are enjoyed by Christians of Kerala even today. His songs written in Malayalam, brought hope and happiness to many lives. He wrote a book named Aasawaasa Geethangal (Songs of Consolation) in which 210 of his songs were included. Seventeen songs written by him was compiled with 427 hymns the Mar Thoma Church published, Kristheeya Keerthanangal as devotional songs.

These include:

1. Dukhaththinte paana paathram karththavente kayyil thannaal....
  (His second son Samuelkutty died in 1912 at the age of nine. It was a big loss in his life which inspired him to write this immortal hymn).
2. Krushinmel krushinmel kaanhunnath- aaritha! ....
3. Ente sampaththennu cholluvann-vereyillonnum ....
4. Ente Daivam swarga simhassanam thannil ....
5. Ponnesu thampuran nalloru rakshakan ....
6. Aaru sahaayikkum? Lokam thunakkyumo? ....
7. Aashwaasame enikkerre thingeedunnu ....
8. Baalar- aakunna njaangalhe yeshu thampuran ....
9. Cherneedume vegam njaanum aa koottaththil ....
10. Ente Daivam Mahathvathil ardhravaanayi....
11. Ushakaalam namezhunelkkuka paraneshuve sthuthippan....

== Last days ==
He was burdened by the death of his second son, poverty, responsibility of caring for his wife and children, illness in his own life and inward conflicts regarding different types of Christian faith and practices among the contemporary believers. He considered himself as a foreigner and sojourner on earth and thus detached himself from worldly worries. He had a strong belief which refutes delusions, that God and God alone was his one and only, refuge and trust and this was his prime strength which enabled him to tread through difficulties. His continuous travels and restless gospel work made him sick many times. In 1945 November, he became very sick. He died at 8.45 am on Friday 30, November 1945 and was buried in the Laka St Thoma Mar Thoma Church cemetery the next day. The funeral service itself was a great honour for him. Two bishops, more than 100 priests and over 40,000 people attended the funeral service.

== Bibliography ==
In Malayalam.

1. George, Dr.K.M. (1995). Sadhu Kochoonju, Christhava Sahitya Samithy, Tiruvalla.
2. Mathew Daniel, Rev.Dr. (1988). Sadhu Sadhu Kochoonju Upadesi). .
3. Mathew P.V. (1995). Keralathile Nazranee Kristanikal (Nazrani Christians of Kerala) Vol. III.
4. Mathew, N.M. (2008) Malanakara Marthoma Sabha Charitram. (History of the Malankara Mar Thoma church.) Volume III.
5. Mar Thoma Evangelistic Association (1964). Suvisesha Senanykal. (Biography of Missionaries)
