= Oyoor =

- village
- Location in Kerala, India Oyoor (India)
- Coordinates: 8°55′45″N 76°54′32″E
- Country: India
- State: Kerala
- District: Kollam

Languages
  - Official: Malayalam, English
- Time zone: UTC+5:30 (IST)
- PIN: 691510
- Telephone code: +91 474 2xxxxxx
- Vehicle registration: KL-24-XXXX
- Website: http://www.oyoormates.in

Oyoor (also spelled "Oyur") is a small township of Velinalloor village in the Kottarakara Taluk, Kollam District of Kerala, India. It is situated on the banks of the Ithikkara River. It is surrounded by several small satellite villages: Ugramkunnu in the south, Chenkulam in the west, Mylode in the north and Karingannoor in the east.

== Landmarks ==
The main centers of public activity in Oyoor consist of a market, a bus stand, a primary health center, lower and upper primary schools, a village administrative office, a post office, a temple, Mosques and Christian churches. A social service club '(occ)' centralizing in Oyoor.

== Education ==
The Government aided upper primary school was established over 75 years ago by Shri T. Abraham and T. Benjamin sons of Shri (Idupadical) Tharian Koruthu. A primary health center (established in 1956 by Dr A .R .Menon, who was then the Health Minister of Kerala state) is situated at Chunkathra.

== Etymology ==
The place derives its name from an old Forest Office where chunkom (taxes) were collected during the Raj.

== The Ithikkara River ==
The Ithikkara River flows south of Ugramkunnu. Prior to public works improvements in 1975, the river used to become swollen and flood during the monsoon season. Both the widest and the narrowest parts of the river may be found near Oyoor, as there is a spot where the water has to flow between two huge rocks. The rocks are named "Unnikkannan Paras", a reference to Lord Krishna. The width between the rocks is only two feet. In summer, when the flow is at its ebb, one can cross the river by jumping. Once the river passes between the rocks, it widens to approximately two furlongs. During summer seasons the water recedes to one side of the river and exposes a large part of the bed covered with white, fine sand. It is here that the "Manali Kachhavadam", an annual flea market of household necessities and other domestic products, takes place. The SreeRama Temple is located on northern bank of the river but, due to a bend in the river, appears to be on the west, looking to the east. A road along a sandy bank passing the temple leads to the northernmost part of Trivandrum district: Pakalkuri, which is home to the nearest government high school. Students from Oyoor have to ferry across the Ithikkara River, in front of the temple (see the picture below, taken in 2006, a view from the bridge connecting Kollam and Trivandrum Dist, the bridge was constructed in 1961–63, foundation stone laid by Sri Pattom Thanupillai, the then chief minister of Kerala The white spot in center of the picture is the temple.)

== Local temples and history ==
The SreeRama Temple is also the site of the "Kaala Vayal" cattle auction/show, a part of the annual "Rohini Nakshathram Ulsavam" (festival) at Velinalloor. This festival has been the subject of a documentary on Jeevan TV. The famous Sri Ramaswamy kshetram (temple), dating back more than 1,000 years, is located in Velinalloor. It is believed that His Highness Marthanda Varma of Travancore was the last king who supported and maintained the temple. Velinalloor has its own significance in the epics. It is believed that Ugramkunnu is the place where Sugerevan lived (Sugreevan Kunnu-Ugramkunnu) and that Valiyan Kunnu is the place where Bali lived (Baliyan Kunnu-Valiyan Kunnu). There is some evidence that Jadayu Para in Chadayamangalam is the place where Ravanan cut Jadayu's wings. Peykavu is a Kavu 100 meters away from the Sree Keezhuttu Devi Temple. Its distinct feature is that no idol of any Lord is installed inside the Kavu. Devotees believe in the presence of Lord Shiva and he is called "Appooppan" (Grandfather). The rituals are performed by the male devotees who visit here, without the presence of Brahmin priests. Women are not allowed inside the Kavu. The most important offering to the Appooppan is "Pey-Oottu" or serving the lord with food, especially bananas. Keezhuttu Devi Temple was recently renovated by the public. It is one of the special temple where both Durga and Bhadrakali resides in the same Nalambalam. Among the nearby attractions are the Velinalloor Sri Ramaswamy Temple, Kuzhithrachalil Sree Murugan temple, which is about 500 and above years old temple, the Mathiyodu Madan Kavu and the Kaithakkal Devi Temple. Kottarakara Ganapathi Temple is easily accessible.

== Celebrities ==
Oyoor resident Kochu Govinda Pillai (1916–2008) was a great Kathakali artist who trained Kathakali under the great Sri. Chennithala Kochu Pillai Panicker and Sri. Kurichi Kunjan Panicker and winner of the Sangeet Natak Akademi Award for 1989.

The Sri Ramavilasam Kathakali school, under Sri Vasukutty, a former Kalamandalam Principal Sri. Kalamandalam Gangadharan Nair (Kathakali music), is located nearby in Veliyanallur. Kalabharathi Kathakali school is also close by at Pakalkuri. Award-winning Kadhakali performers namely Kalamandalam Ratheesan and Kalamandalam Ramachandran hails from this village. Kalamandalam Ratheeshan is well famous for his 'Nalan' and Kalamandalam Ramachandran for his female characters especially the 'Kurathi'.

In Ugramkunnu there is a government school near the Sri Ramaswamy Temple, founded 55 years ago by Sri Krishna Pillai (the Panchayat President) as a private school.
