= Kottukal Cave Temple =

Building in India

Kottukkal Cave Temple
- Cave Temple, Kottukkal, Anchal, Kollam, Kerala

Religion
- Affiliation: Hinduism
- District: Kollam
- Deity: Shiva Ling
- Festival: Maha Shivaratri

Location
- Location: Kottukkal, Anchal
- State: Kerala
- Country: India
- Coordinates: 8°53′22.5″N 76°54′18.9″E

Architecture
- Type: Rock-cut architecture

Specifications
- Temple: One
- Elevation: 72.53 m (238 ft)

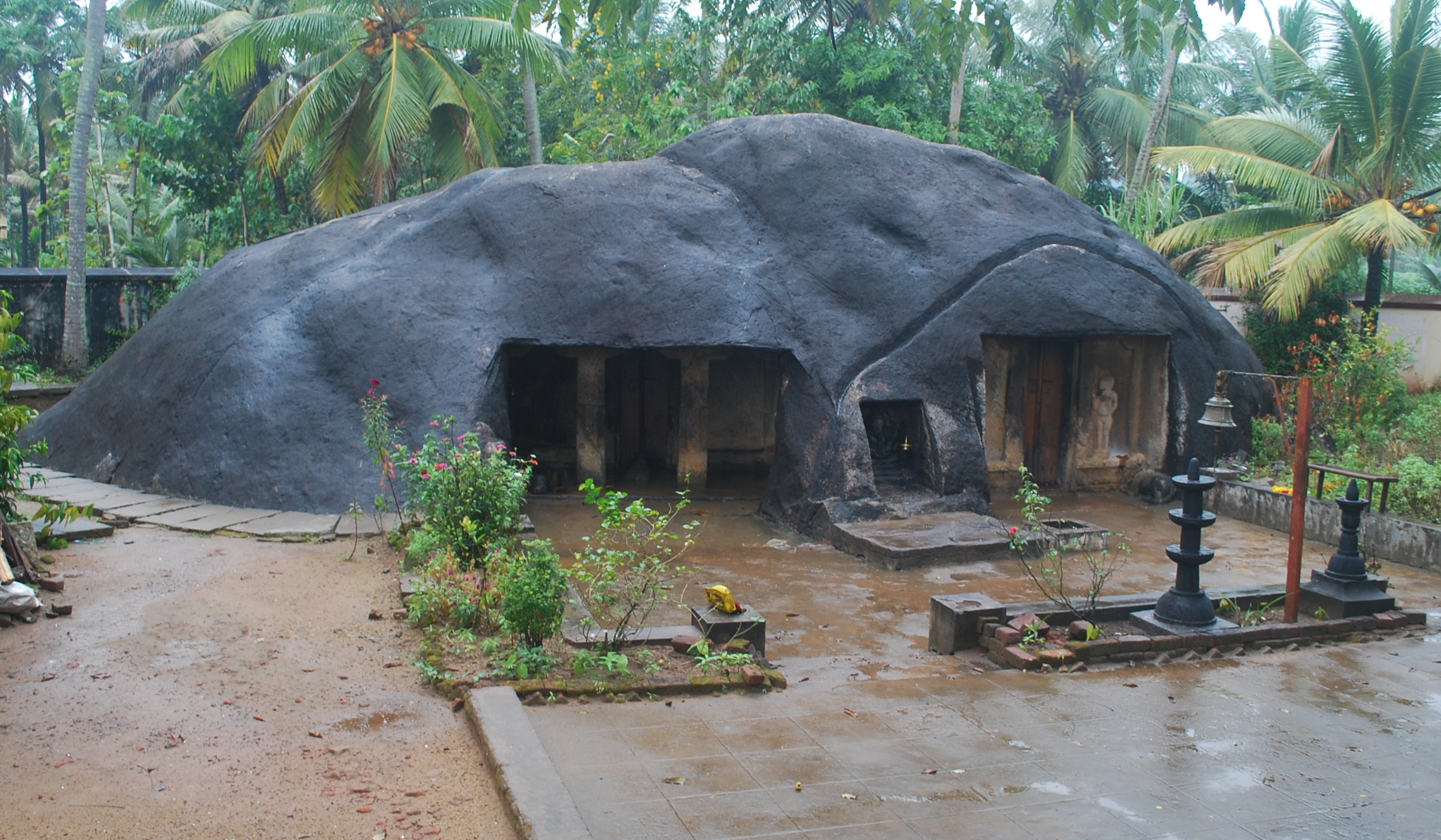
Kottukal Cave Temple

Kottukkal Cave Temple, also known as Kaltrikkovil in Malayalam, is an existing example of rock cut architecture, built between 6th and 8th centuries CE. It is situated in the village of Kottukkal, near Anchal, Kollam district, Kerala in India. The name Kottukkal (which means Kothiya Kallu- carved rock) is a reference to rock cut shrine. There are two caves of unequal size, both facing the east with the sculpture of the main deity Ganapathy in between. The smaller cave has an idol of Hanuman and the larger one has a monolithic Nandi (bull) in it. Lord Shiva is also a deity in the temple in the form of a Shiva Ling.

According to local traditions, the big rock was brought to the area by the incarnations of Shiva including Nandi to the area, and another small rock near to it called 'chummaadu para' is believed to be the support to relieve the pain when the bigger hard rock kept in head. Historians read its origin back to the 7th century AD when 'Nedila Paranthaka Nedumchadayan' who ruled Chadayamangalam the nearby place, made the rock cut temple.

It is now situated in the centre of a large extent of paddy fields and daily rituals are done under Travancore Devaswom Board. The calmness and tranquility of the area attracts the travellers, and one can reach the spot travelling 45 kilometers from Kollam.

== Location ==
This Rock-cut temple is located with the geographic coordinates of 8°53′22.5″N 76°54′18.9″E at an altitude of about 72.53 m above the mean sea level.

== Architecture ==
The temple is made by carving out a gigantic piece of rock. This architectural is situated in the middle of paddy field and from a distance gives impression of a sleeping elephant. There are two 10 feet long and 8 feet wide rooms cut into the rocks and covered by a single rock overhead. The temple which has a Shiva linga flanked by Nandi and Sri Hanuman is believed to belong to the period of Pallava dynasty (8th century BC) and contemporaneous with the Shore Temple at Mahabalipuram near Chennai.

== Access ==
From Thiruvananthapuram,

1. the MC Road at Ayoor jn turn right, the road leading to Anchal, turn right at Anchal Kurishmoodu jn. then go through Kadakkal road via kottukal jn. (or)
2. in MC road Manjappara which from Ayoor bridge then to the temple.

From Kollam, local roads lead to Ayoor first and at Ayoor jn. turn to Anchal road and turn right at Anchal Kurshinmoodu jn. and turn right to Kadakkal road via Kottukal jn.

The best and widest road is MC road -Ayoor Anchal road -Anchal Kadakkal road.
