= Oyoor Kochugovinda Pillai =

Indian Kathakali exponent (1917-2008)

- Born: 17 November 1917; Oyoor, Travancore, British Raj
- Died: 16 August 2008 (aged 90); Oyoor, Kollam district, Kerala, India
- Occupation: Kathakali exponent
- Children: 9
- Parents: Narayana Pillai (father); Kochupennu (mother)
- Awards: Sangeet Natak Akademi Award (1989); Kerala Sangeetha Nataka Akademi Award (1986)

Oyoor Kochugovinda Pillai was an Indian Kathakali artist and teacher from Kerala. He received the Kerala Sangeetha Nataka Akademi Award from Government of Kerala in 1986 and the Sangeet Natak Akademi Award from Government of India in 1989.

== Biography ==
Kochugovinda Pillai was born on Malayalam date 17 Thulam 1093 (corresponding to 17 November 1917) at Moothukonath house in Oyoor in Velinalloor village of present-day Kollam district of Kerala to Narayana Pillai and Kochupennu. He started Kathakali training at the age of 9 under his uncle Chathannur Velu Pillai. After six years of practice, he joined his uncle's Kathakali troupe. He also studied Kathakali from Chennithala Kochu Pillai Panicker, and Kurichi Kunjan Pannikkar, and also studied literature from Pallikkal Moothala Kesava Pillai.

=== Personal life and death ===
Pillai had six sons and three daughters. His son Kalamandalam Oyoor Ratheesan, nephew Kalamandalam Ramachandran, and grandson Govind are Kathakali actors. He died on August 16, 2008 at his residence in Oyoor.

== Career ==
Pillai made his debut in Kathakali by portraying the role of Krishna at the Velinallur Sree Ramaswamy Temple and ended his career portraying Kuchela at the same temple. He has performed all the Kathakali characters except for the Chuvanna Thadi (red beard) and the female characters. Among various characters he played from Indian mythology in his Kathakali career spanning over eight decades, he is best known for his role as 'Hamsam' (Swan) in the play Nalacharitham. Other roles played by him include Krishna and Sundara-Brahmana in Rukmini svayamvaram (Rukmini's Choice of Groom), Pushkara, Rukmangada, Karna, Arjuna and Kacha.

In 1966, he was invited to Singapore and remained there for some time to instruct Kathakali to children. As a member of the noted FACT (Fertilisers and Chemicals Travancore) troupe he toured all over India and continued to perform till his 70s.

== Awards and honors ==
Pillai received the Kerala Sangeetha Nataka Akademi Award from Government of Kerala in 1986 and the Sangeet Natak Akademi Award from Government of India in 1989.

== Legacy ==
An art and cultural center has been built in Kochu Govinda Pillai's hometown in his honor. His death anniversary and commemoration are held every year under the leadership of this art and cultural center.

A Kathakali award is also being given under the name Oyoor Kochugovinda Pillai Aasan Puraskaram. The award consists of Rs. 25,000, a certificate of appreciation and a plaque. Kathakali actor Kalamandalam Rajasekharan was the recipient in 2026.

In January 2018, during a week-long Kathakali festival organised by the District Kathakali Club at Cherukolpuzha, T. C. Sunil Dutt delivered a commemoration speech on Oyoor Kochu Govinda Pillai as part of events marking his birth centenary.
