= Book town =

Town or village with many used book or antiquarian bookstores

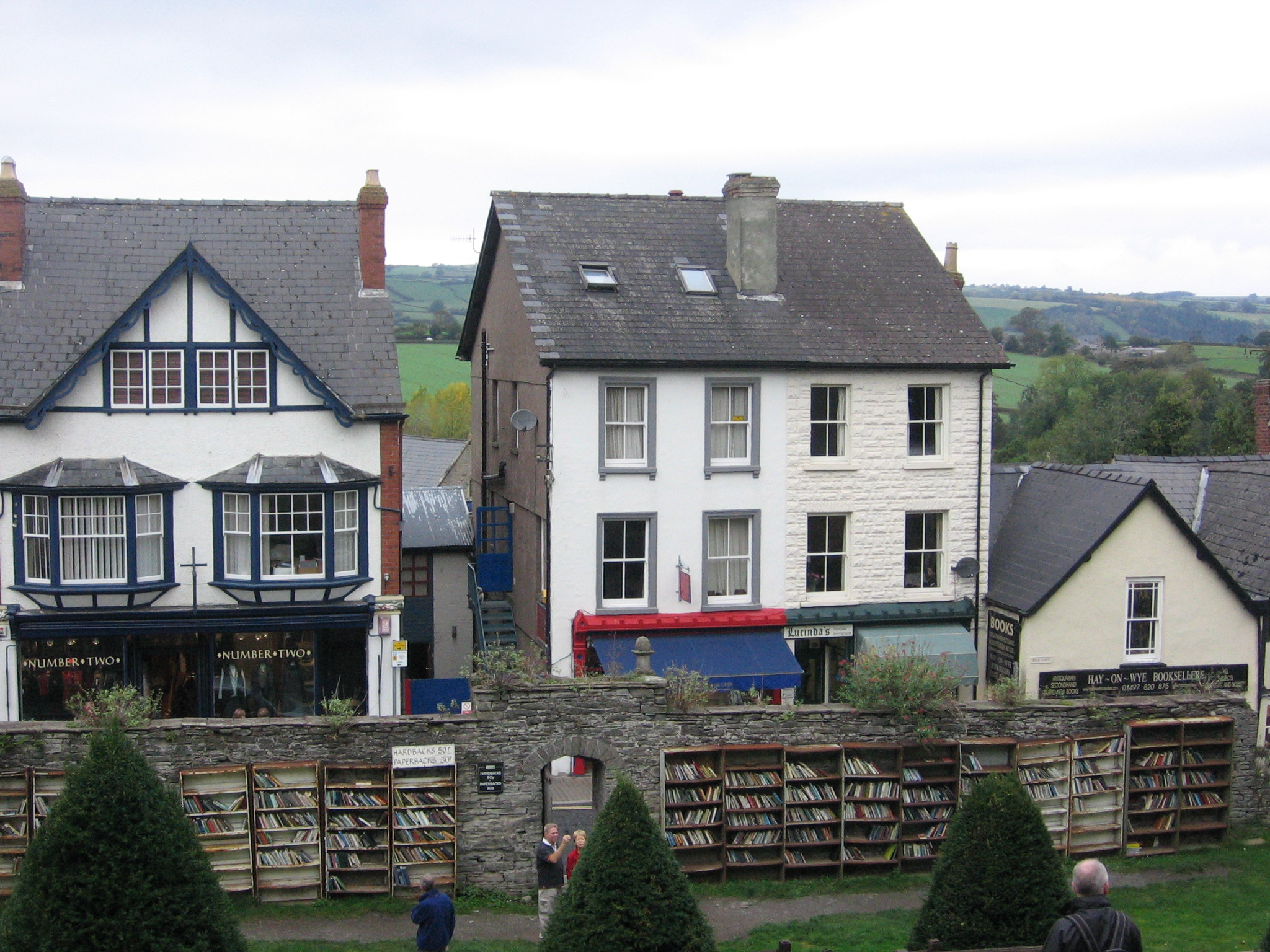
Hay Castle bookshop in Hay-on-Wye, Wales, with other bookshops on the road behind.

A book town is a town or village with many used book or antiquarian bookstores. These stores, as well as literary festivals, attract bibliophile tourists. Some book towns are members of the International Organisation of Book Towns.

== List of book towns ==
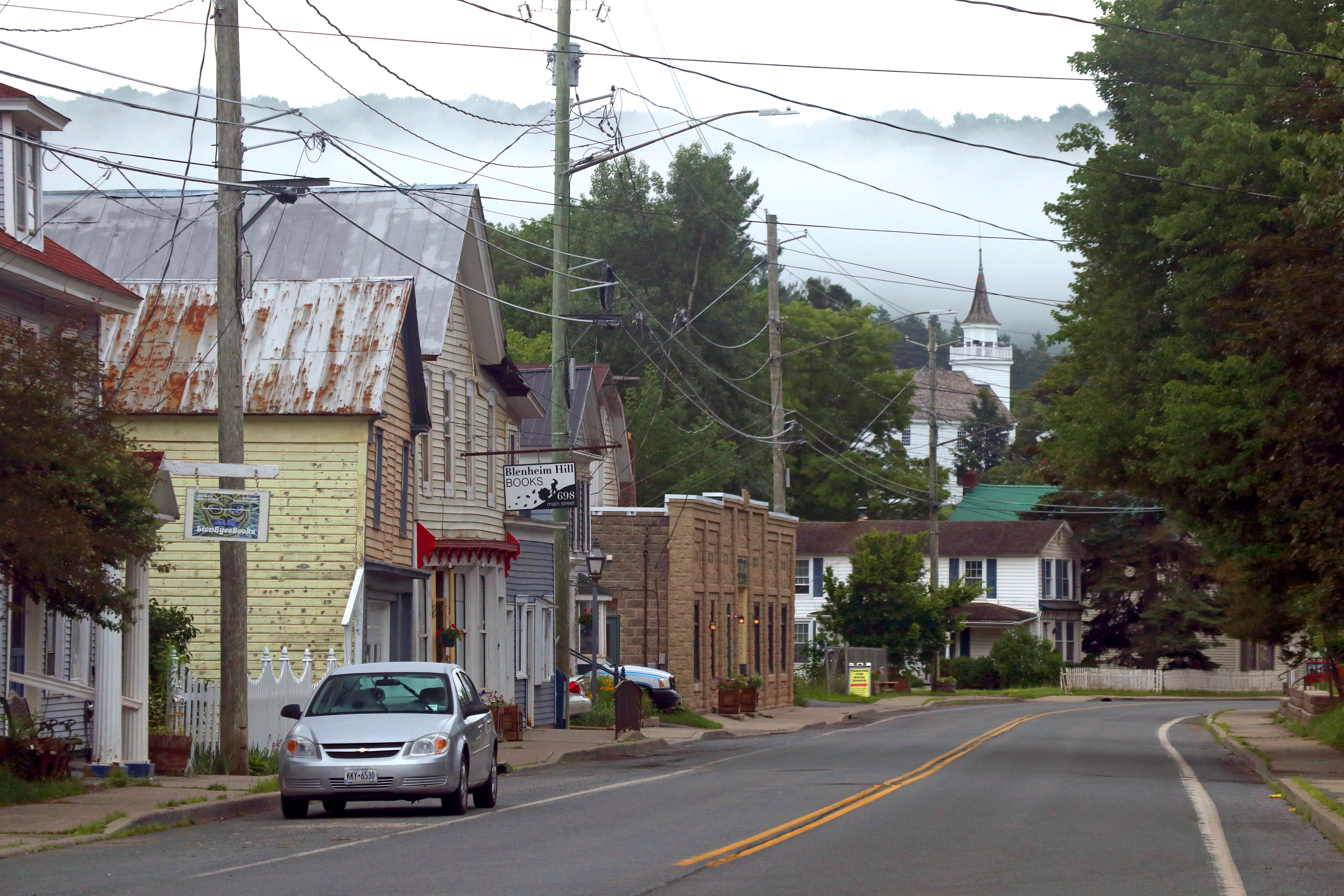
Bookshops seen along Main Street in Hobart, NY

=== Book towns with known dates of operation ===
- Bellprat, Spain (2008)
- Bhilar, India (2017)
- Blaenavon, Wales (2003–2006)
- Borrby, Sweden (2011)
- Brownville, Nebraska, US (2004)
- Cargill, Ontario, Canada (since 2021)
- Clunes, Victoria, Australia (2007)
- Dalmellington, Scotland (1997–2005)
- Esquelbecq, France (2010)
- Featherston, New Zealand (2015)
- Hay-on-Wye, Wales (1962)
- Hobart, New York, US (2005)
- Jimbōchō Book Town, Japan (1868)
- La Pobla de Segur, Spain (2018)
- Langkawi International Book Village, Malaysia (1997, unknown date of closure)
- Mellösa, Sweden (2001)
- Montmorillon, France (2000)
- Montolieu, France (1991)
- Paju Book City, South Korea (1989)
- Redu, Belgium (1984)
- Sedbergh, England (2003)
- Torup, Denmark (2006)
- Urueña, Spain (2007)

=== Book towns with unknown dates of operation ===
- Timbuktu, Mali

== See also ==
- UNESCO World Book Capital (est. 2001)
