= Pakalkuri =

- town
- Location in Kerala, India Pakalkuri (India)
- Coordinates: 8°51′5″N 76°47′25″E
- Country: India
- State: Kerala
- District: Thiruvananthapuram

Government
  - Type: Panchayat
  - Body: Pallickal Panchayat

Languages
  - Official: Malayalam, English
- Time zone: UTC+5:30 (IST)
- Vehicle registration: KL-81

Pakalkuri is a village located in the eastern part of Varkala Taluk in the Thiruvananthapuram district of Kerala, India. It is situated 20 km east of Varkala Town on the banks of the Ithikkara River and is well known for its serene beauty and landscape. The Ithikkara River, which originates from the Western Ghats, separates Thiruvananthapuram and Kollam districts at Pakalkuri in its meandering to the Arabian Sea.

== Location ==
Pakalkuri belongs to Pallickal panchayathu in Varkala taluk in Thiruvananthapuram District. One can reach Pakalkuri from Varkala in SH63 Road via Pallickal, from Ayoor in MC Road Via Velinalloor, from Parippally in NH47 via Kulamada and from Kottarakkara in MC Road via Oyoor. Pakalkuri is well connected with state transport services and private sector transports from all these centres.

The nearest airport is Thiruvananthapuram International Airport which is about 50 km away. The nearest major railway stations is Varkala

== Facilities ==
The main centres of social activities in Pakalkuri are Guru Chengannoor Kathakali Akademi (Kala Bharathi), Government Vocational Higher Secondary School, Lower Primary School, post office, South Indian Bank, Mahadever Temple, Muslim mosques, Kerala Gandhi Smaraka Nidhi Kendra (Khadi Board), cashew nut factory, the Pakalkuri Panchayat Market, a village milk production society, Government Veterinary Hospital, a government homeopathic hospital, Padmavilasom Ayurveda Vaidyasala- a traditional Ayurvedic Centre with classical medicines, a public library, KSEB sub office, an active arts and sports Club, PASC with its roots extending 40 years, and a branch of Pallikal Service Co-operative Bank.

=== Education ===
Guru Chengannoor Kathakali Academy (Kala Bharathi), situated near Pakalkuri temple, is one of the Kathakali institutions in Kerala. Kathakali Sangeetaham and Chenda are also studied in this school. Sri. Madavur Vasudevan Nair is the principal of this institution.

Pakalkuri Government Higher Secondary School is located at the Pakakuri junction. Standard 5 to 10, plus two and vocational courses (Accounting and Auditing) are offered in this school.

Pakalkuri was blessed with the primary education facilities earlier than Indian independence. The primary Malayalam school was upgraded to upper level and then secondary level during the early 1950s. Pakalkuri High School had been the only secondary level school within the perimeter of 10 kilometres in this period.

== Social centres ==
=== P.A.S.C. ===
The presence of a primary school since the early years of Independence, literacy had been higher and developments in reading habits led to the formation of a Gramoddarana Vayanasala with donations of books and newspapers in the early fifties and early sixties reformed by name Nehru Memorial Arts and Sports Club with the backing of second generation literates. A lot of music instruments and sports items were granted by Government departments. Sports and arts activities were conducted regularly to uplift the social life. The activities could manage to acquire 3 cents of land by the donation from Singapore Pakalkurians (thanks to Mr. Habeeb Mohamed, Kunnumpurath) but to die down to emerge as PASC by the active third generation.

=== Religious centres ===
Pakalkuri Maha Vishnu Temple is situated on the banks of Ithikkara River. It is one of the few temples in Kerala which offers Darsanam to the western direction. The Prathista in this temple is god Mahavishnu. Shiva, Ganapathi, Devi, Ayyappa are also there as Upaprathista. There are a number of Utsavams in this temple. The great Mahotsavam starts ten days before the Sivarathri day and ends on Sivarathri. Gajamela is one of the attractions of the Mahotsavam, which occurs in the ninth day.

Pakalkuri Mosque is the religious centre of the Muslims in Pakalkuri town area. It is situated in Kottiyam mukku (junction). A madrasah is associated with this mosque. There is another Juma Ath Masjid, Thazhebhagam Jama At Masjid, which is the parent and religious centre since the history of Muslims in the locality, on the banks of the Ithikkara river, at Pallikkapuzha Kadavu, 1.5 km from High School Junction.

=== Industry ===
Kerala Gandhi Smaraka Nidhi Kendra, located at Kottiyam mukku (junction), is under the government, and produces cloth and offers job to women in the village. The cashew nut factory located at Arayil and Maramcode also offers jobs to women.

A granite crusher unit and a government veterinary center are also working in Pakalkuri.

Pakalkuri post office is a sub post office of the Pallickal post office. Its pin code number is 695 604.

=== Market ===
Pakalkuri Market operates on Sundays and Wednesdays. People can purchase fish, meat, vegetables, agricultural tools, and stationery items from the market during those days.
