= Pustakanch Gaav =

Library in India

Village of Books
- Pustakanch Gaav
- Logo of Pustakanch Gaav
- Location: Bhilar, Maharashtra, India, India
- Type: Special library
- Established: May 4, 2017

Pustakanch Gaav (English: Village of Books) is a special library in Bhilar, Maharashtra that opened on May 4, 2017. The initiative was conceptualized and led by Vinod Tawde, Minister of Cultural Affairs and Marathi Language and inaugurated by Devendra Fadnavis, Ex. Chief Minister of Maharashtra. This government initiative is inspired by Britain’s Hay-on-Wye, a notable Welsh town known for its book stores. At the time of launch, there were 25 artistically decorated locations in Bhilar that are turned into spots for readers; collectively they housed over 15,000 books in 18 distinct genres. Most books were in Marathi language and there were plans to add additional 25,000 books in other languages such as English, Hindi and Gujarati.

On 2021 June 19, Perumkulam, a village in Kerala’s Kollam district, was declared a Pusthaka Gramam (village of books) by Kerala Chief Minister Pinarayi Vijayan.The announcement made on June 19, National Reading Day, makes it India’s second and Kerala’s first such village. At the heart of the announcement is its library, Bapuji Smaraka Vayanasala.

== History ==
=== Planning ===
Bhilar, a village near Mahabaleshwar and Panchgani, was finalized as the location; the long-term vision is to promote the destination as a cultural and literary hub. Seventy five artists from across India traveled to Bhilar to creatively design 25 locations that were shortlisted as reading spots and exhibition centers. These locations include a temple, two schools, several houses and homestays.

== Events ==
Recitations and depictions of classic work of many renowned poets and writers are organized by community in past. Events are often graced by dignitaries in literature field.

== Genres ==
Pustakanch Gaav has 19 libraries exclusive to 19 genres, each library is designed and decorated by freelance artists, painters and professionals.

=== Hagiography ===
It hosts the books of hagiography at Pustakanch Gaav.

=== Poetry ===
In this hall of the house at Pustakanch Gaav, are works of Manik Sitaram Godghate (popularly known as Kavi Grace,) Shanta Shelke and other poets.

=== Newspaper ===
At Pustakanch Gaav, there is a home that host newspapers in the Marathi language.
