= K. N. Balagopal =

Indian politician

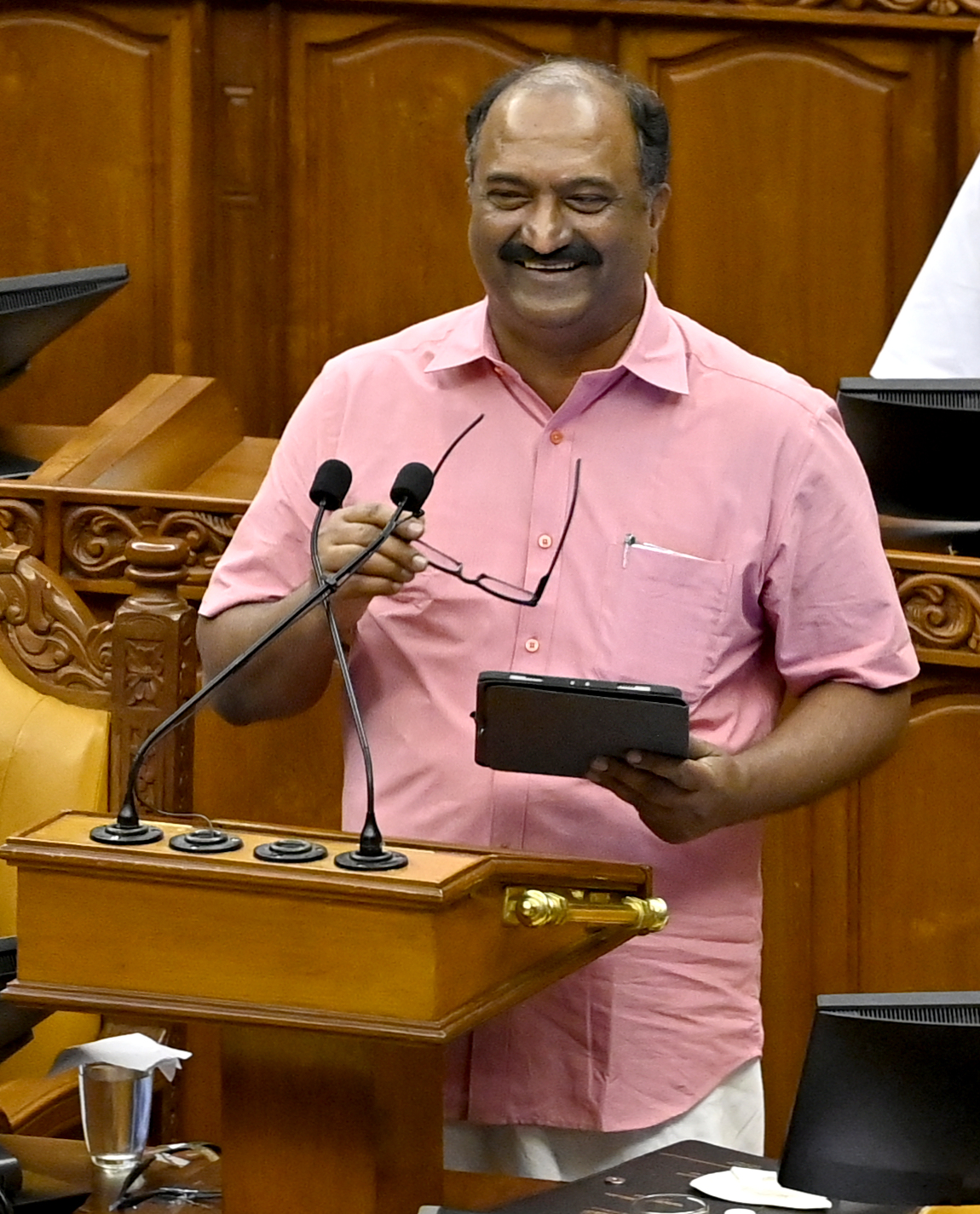

Former Minister for Finance, Government of Kerala
- In office 20 May 2021 – 4 May 2026
- Chief Minister: Pinarayi Vijayan
- Departments: Finance; National Savings; Stores Purchase; State Goods and Services Tax (Commercial Taxes); Agricultural Income Tax; Treasuries; Lotteries; State Audit; Kerala State Financial Enterprises; State Insurance; Kerala Financial Corporation; Stamps and Stamp Duties; Kerala Infrastructure Investment Fund Board (KIIFB); Local Fund Audit; Public Enterprises
- Preceded by: T. M. Thomas Isaac
- Succeeded by: V.D. Satheesan

Member of the Kerala Legislative Assembly
- Incumbent
- Assumed office 24 May 2021
- Preceded by: P. Aisha Potty
- Constituency: Kottarakkara

Member of Parliament, Rajya Sabha
- In office 3 April 2010 – 2 April 2016
- Constituency: Kerala

Personal details
- Born: 28 July 1963 (age 63) Kalanjoor, Pathanamthitta, Kerala, India
- Party: Communist Party of India (Marxist)
- Spouse: Asha Prabhakaran
- Children: 2
- Parents: P. K. Narayana Panicker; Radhamony Amma
- Education: Kerala Law Academy Law College, Thiruvananthapuram

Kalanjoor Narayana Panicker Balagopal (born 28 July 1963) is an Indian Politician belonging to the Communist Party of India (Marxist), who previously served as the Minister for Finance for the Government of Kerala and Member of Legislative Assembly representing Kottarakkara. He was a member of the Rajya Sabha the Upper house of Indian Parliament from 2010 to 2016.

== Personal life ==
Son of P. K. Narayana Panicker and Radhamony Amma, Balagopal was born at Kalanjoor, Pathanamthitta on 28 July 1963. Balagopal is an M.Com., LL.B., LL.M. graduate as well as a social and political worker. He married Asha Prabhakaran on 24 March 1999 and the couple have one son and one daughter. His brother K. N. Madhusoodanan, an entrepreneur with business interests in varied fields, is the part time chairman of Dhanlaxmi Bank.

== Political career ==
He entered politics through Students Federation of India and held positions such as district president (Kollam), state president (Kerala), and all India President of SFI and DYFI. He was also the President of Kerala University Employees Confederation and a Member of Student Syndicate, Kerala University. He was the Political Secretary of Chief Minister of Kerala, V.S. Achuthanandan from 31 May 2006 – 13 March 2010. He is a member of CPI(M) Kerala State Committee since 1998. He was elected to Rajya sabha in April 2010 and was a Member of Parliament from April 2010-April 2016. In the 2021 Kerala Assembly Election, he was elected to the Legislative Assembly from Kottarakkara constituency by a margin of 10,814. He is now selected as Central Committee member of CPI(M).
