= Karingannoor =

- village
- Location in Kerala, India Karingannoor (India)
- Coordinates: 8°55′45″N 76°54′32″E
- Country: India
- State: Kerala
- District: Kollam

Languages
  - Official: Malayalam, English
- Time zone: UTC+5:30 (IST)
- PIN: 691516
- Telephone code: 0091 474 2xxxxxx
- Vehicle registration: KL-24 xxxx
- Nearest city: Oyoor

Karingannoor is a small township of Velinalloor village in the Kottarakara Taluk, Kollam District of Kerala, India. It is surrounded by several small places: Adayara, Puthuserry, Atoorkonam, Thannimoodu, Alumoodu, Mottarkunnu, Puthanvila, 504, Mulakuvila, Perupuram and Ezhamkutty.

== Public Facilities ==
The main centers of public activity in Karingannoor lower and upper primary schools, Velinalloor BSNL office, a post office Pin 691516, Indian Overseas Bank Kringannoor 2466432, The Velinalloor Service Co-operative Bank LTD NO.2873, Velinalloor Agriculture Office, five temples, and a social service club centralizing in Karingannoor.

== Local temples ==
- Velinalloor Sriramaswamy temple
- Puthussery Ayyappa temple
- Sree Bhuvaneswari Devi Temple
- Kuzhithrachalil Sree murugan temple
- Mangad Ilanjikkal Temple
- kovilkunnu SREE SUBRAMANYA SWAMI TEMPLE
