= Elamad =

- village
- Location in Kerala, India Elamad (India)
- Coordinates: 8.9008602°N 76.8357289°E
- Country: India
- State: Kerala
- District: Kollam

Population (2011)
  - Total: 27,248

Languages
  - Official: Malayalam, English
- Time zone: UTC+5:30 (IST)
- Vehicle registration: KL-

Elamadu is a village and Gram Panchayat in Kottarakkara tehsil in Kollam district in the state of Kerala, India.

== Administrative organization ==
In the 2020 elections, the standing committee of Elamadu Gram Panchayat consisted of 17 members, representing the same number of wards, among which Valiyode.

== Demographics ==
As of 2001 India census, Elamadu had a population of 26382 with 12571 males and 13811 females. In 2011 the total population had risen to 27,248.
