= Valakom, Kollam =

Valakom
- Revenue Village
- Interactive map of Valakom
- Coordinates: 8.9545629°N 76.8427834°E
- Country: India
- State: Kerala
- District: Kollam

Area
  - Total: 17.61 km^{2} (6.80 sq mi)

Population (2011)
  - Total: 17,928
  - Density: 1,018/km^{2} (2,637/sq mi)

Languages
  - Official: Malayalam, English
- Time zone: UTC+5:30 (IST)
- Postal code: 691532

Valakom is a revenue village located in Kottarakara taluk of Kollam district in Kerala, India. This village falls under the jurisdiction of Ummannoor Grama Panchayat.

== Politics ==
Valakom comes under the Kottarakkara legislative assembly constituency currently represented by Adv. Aisha Potty of CPI(M), and under the Mavelikkara parliament constituency currently represented by Mr. Kodikkunnil Suresh of INC.Former minister R Balakrishna Pillai and incumbent minister K B Ganesh Kumar is from Valakom.

== Institutions and businesses ==
Many churches and religious institutions are situated here. Y.M.A. Library and Sree Gosalakrishna temple are situated at Marangattukonam, 1 km from Valakom. A police aid post is located near the Mercy Hospital Junction (Old Kalachantha/cattle market) which is one km north of the town in SH-1.

=== Education ===
The major educational institutions in the village are the Marthoma Higher Secondary School(started in 1924, which is the oldest one in this locality), R. V. Training College & school and C.S.I. Training centre, college & school for the Hearing Impaired.

- Marthoma Higher Secondary School, Valakom
- Rama Vilasam Higher Secondary School, Valakom
- Rama Vilasom Teacher Training Institute, Valakom
- Mercy College Of Nursing, Valakom
- St.Mary's Bethany Central School, Valakom
- CSI School for the Deaf & Dumb

=== Health ===
Mercy Hospital is a major health care centre in this area. There are a few other clinics also there.

- Karunya Hospital, Valakom
- Twinkle Hospital, Valakom
