= Chakkuvarakkal =

- village
- Location in Kerala, India Chakkuvarakkal (India)
- Coordinates: 8°59′0″N 76°51′0″E
- Country: India
- State: Kerala
- District: Kollam

Population (2011)
  - Total: 16,086

Languages
  - Official: Malayalam, English
- Time zone: UTC+5:30 (IST)
- Vehicle registration: KL-

Chakkuvarakkal is a village in Kollam district in the state of Kerala, India.

== Demographics ==
As of 2011 India census, Chakkuvarakkal had a population of 16086 with 7470 males and 8616 females.

Around 13 km from Kottarakkara and almost same from Punalur.
