= Nelliparampu Sreekrishna Swami Temple =

Nellipparambu Sreekrishna Swami temple is located in the Nellipparambu, Kollam district of the state of Kerala, India. It is estimated to be around 1800 years old. Nellipparambu Sreekrishna Swami temple is a Hindu temple dedicated to Lord Krishna. Krishna is popularly known in Kerala by different names such as Kannan, Unnikkannan ("Baby" Kannan), Unnikrishnan, Balakrishnan, and Guruvayurappan.The Krishna temple is one of the famous Krishna\Vishnu temple in kollam.

== Festivals and ceremonies ==
Various pujas (ceremonies, or festivals) are performed at the Nelliparampu Sreekrishna Swami temple, at auspicious times. There are a number of utsavams in this temple. The mahotsavam is held every year during the month Minam {March–April}.
