= Ummannoor =

- village
- Location in Kerala, India Ummannoor (India)
- Coordinates: 8°57′0″N 76°47′0″E
- Country: India
- State: Kerala
- District: Kollam

Government
  - Body: Gram panchayat

Area
  - Total: 18.42 km^{2} (7.11 sq mi)

Population (2011)
  - Total: 17,406
  - Density: 945.0/km^{2} (2,447/sq mi)

Languages
  - Official: Malayalam, English
- Time zone: UTC+5:30 (IST)
- Postal code: 691520
- Vehicle registration: KL-
- Nearest city: Kollam
- Literacy: 89%
- Lok Sabha constituency: Indian Parliament
- Vidhan Sabha constituency: Kerala Legislative
- Climate: fair (Köppen)

Ummannoor is a village and gram panchayat in Kollam district in the state of Kerala, India. It comes under Kottarakkara assembly, Mavelikkara parliamentary constituency and Vettikkavala block panchayat. The place has a Village office too. Ummannoor village has population of 17406 as per the Census India 2011. Ummannoor is known for farming and agricultural trade like Ginger, Black pepper, Paddy, Rubber etc.

== Demographics ==
As of 2011 India census, Ummannoor had a population of 17,406, with 8436 males and 8970 females.

== Schools ==
- MM LPS Andoor
- Marthoma High School
- St. John's vhss Ummannoor
- Rama Vilasam H S S
- Govt LPS Ummannoor
