= Kottarakkara Sree Mahaganapathi Kshethram =

Hindu temple in Kerala, India

Kottarakkara Sree Mahaganapathi Temple
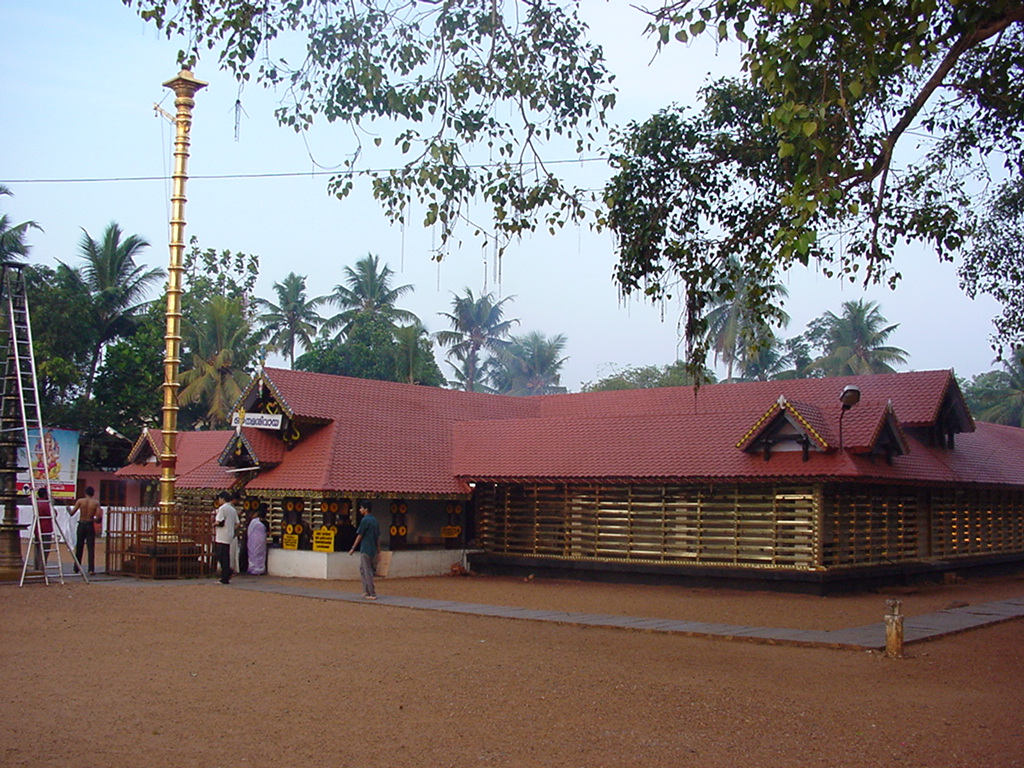

- Kottarakkara Sree Mahaganapathi Temple, Kottarakkara, Kollam, Kerala

Religion
- Affiliation: Hinduism
- District: Kollam
- Deity: Lord Shiva and Lord Ganesha
- Festival: Meda Thiruvathira ulsavam (മേടതിരുവാതിര ഉത്സവം)

Location
- Location: Kottarakkara
- State: Kerala
- Country: India
- Interactive map of Kottarakkara Sree Mahaganapathi Temple
- Coordinates: 9°00′03.2″N 76°46′12.3″E

Architecture
- Type: Architecture of Kerala

Specifications
- Temple: One
- Elevation: 64.09 m (210 ft)

Website
- http://www.kottarakaramahaganapathi.org/

Kottarakkara Sree Mahaganapathy Temple is a Hindu temple in Kottarakkara in the Indian state of Kerala. Though the central deity is Shiva, the temple is known for the shrine of Shiva's son Ganesha (Mahaganapathy).

Non-Hindus are permitted.

== Temple ==
The deities of Kottarakkara Sree Mahaganapathy Kshethram are Shiva, his consort Parvati, his sons Ganesha, Murugan and Ayyappan, and the serpent deity Nagaraja. Even though the main deity is Shiva, the main priority is given to Ganesha. All deities except Parvati and Ganesha face east. The main offerings of the temple are Unniyappam.
