= Bhilar =

Coordinates: 17.913°N 73.762°E

Bhilar is a village in Satara district in the Indian state of Maharashtra.

== Geography ==
Bhilar is located near the hill station Panchgani. Bhilar is popular for its strawberries.

== Village of books ==
Bhilar became India's first "village of books", as more than 35,000 books are available to explore free of cost. These books are available at 35 locations, including homes, schools, lodges and temples.

To make these books widely available and to provide an appropriate environment for reading villagers, the Gram panchayat and school management came together to provide these facilities free of charge. Anybody can visit this town of books and find colorful signboards on roads showing genres of books instead of road or area names. After deciding on genre, anybody can enter the place, like a library or the house of a villager, and browse their catalogs.

This facility is available from 9:00 a.m. to 6:00 p.m. While the books can be freely read on location, they are not available for sale or to take home. Lots of readers, travelers and celebrities from various fields had this experience. School trips to Bhilar are also very frequent. The village provides a unique exhibition and library of a vast variety of books, where one can explore various unknown books as well. Many events are arranged in Bhilar, including drama presentations, book publications, musical events, workshops etc. Lodging and food are available as a paid service.

It is a concept inspired by Britain's Hay-on-Wye, a Welsh town known for its book stores and literature festivals.

== See also ==
- Perumkulam
- Pustakanch Gaav
