= Vettikkavala =

- Village
- Location in Kerala, India Vettikkavala (India)
- Coordinates: 8°59′0″N 76°49′0″E
- Country: India
- State: Kerala
- District: Kollam

Area
  - Total: 18.71 km^{2} (7.22 sq mi)
- Elevation: 72 m (236 ft)

Population (2011)
  - Total: 20,118
  - Density: 1,075/km^{2} (2,785/sq mi)

Languages
  - Official: Malayalam, English
- Time zone: UTC+5:30 (IST)
- Postal code: 691538
- Vehicle registration: KL-24

Vettikkavala is a village located in the Kollam district in the state of Kerala, India. The village is famous for Shiva-Vishnu temples which hosts a special deity called Vathukkal Njaali Kunju. An annual celebration of Pongala is held at the temple. The village is also well known for temple arts (kshetra kala) and a palace constructed by Sree Moolam Thirunal.

== Etymology ==
The village Vettikkavala derives its name from the origins of idol worship of the temple here. The initial worship was carried out on an idol beneath a Vetti( aporosa cardiosperma) tree that existed near the temple. According to local historians, this tree was roughly situated near the present-day government school.

== Demographics ==
As of the 2011 India census, Vettikkavala has a population of 20,118 with 5,313 households. The majority of the population identifies as Hindu and Christians are the largest religious minority. Scheduled Castes make up 17.02% of the total population; 0.12% of the population are Scheduled Tribes.

== Administration and Politics ==
In local self governance, the village of Vettikkavala falls within the Block panchayat named Vettikkavala (one among the 11 blocks in Kollam district) and the is spread across Gram panchayats of Vettikkavala and Melila. In revenue administration it comes under in the Kottarakara Taluk of Kollam district of Kerala. Vettikkavala is part of the Mavelikara (Lok Sabha constituency) and in the state legislature, it forms part of Pathanapuram legislative seat.

== Attractions and Notable Locations ==
=== Vettikkavala Sree Mahadevar temple ===
Vettikkavala Sree Mahadevar temple is one of the largest and most famous Shiva-Vishnu temples in Kerala. As per oral history there was an idol worship carried out beneath a vetti tree near the present day temple in olden times. The available records suggests that in around the 17th or 18th century, a temple was constructed near the tree by the queen of Elayadath Swaroopam. The Elayadath Swaroopam centered at Kottarakkara was brought under Travancore in 1742 by troops of Marthanda Varma as a result of Travancore–Dutch War. The temple remained in a dilapidated state for many years after the annexation. However, in 1900 (Malayalam era 1176), and under the insistence of palace manager Sankaran Thampi the king of Travancore, Moolam Thirunal renovated the temple into its current structure.

The Travancore Devaswom Board made a major investment in restoring the temple. In 1996, another round of maintenance was undertaken. During this work, a portion of kulikadavu around the temple pond was inadvertently damaged.

On the southern side of the temple lies a palace constructed by Travancore kings during the reign of Moolam Thirunal. This palace was designed for kings and royal family members who were visiting the adjacent temple. Presently, weather and encroaching vegetation are leading the temple into further ruin.

=== Other Religious Places ===
- Ancient Sadananda Ashram, Sadanandapuram
- Kannamcode Sree Subrahmanya Swami Temple
- Edamana Madom Sree Bhagavathy Trust Raktheshwari Kudumba Paradevatha Temple
- Koikkal Sree Dharma Sastha Temple
- Villur Vaikuntanatha Temple
- Chirattakonam Church
- Thalachira Mosque
- India Pentecostal Church of God
- Assemblies of God in India
- The Pentecostal Mission
- APA
- Kattalanchavarkavu pachoor
- Bethel Marthoma Church, Panavely

=== Tourist Attractions ===
- Kallada Irrigation Project
- KTDC Motel Aaram, Sadanandapuram
- Pinnacle View Point
- Kazhuvudayan kunnu, Pachoor
- Muttamala

=== Educational Institutions ===
Vettikavala Government Model High School is a high-tech, high-achieving secondary school. Another higher secondary school is in Sadanandapuram and is also high achieving academically. High schools are situated in Thalachira, Chakkuvarakkal, Kottavattom and are at a good level. Some lp, up, and welfare schools are also run by the government. Sector and some aided schools are also run by the private sector. There is also a polytechnic college in Thalachira.

- Govt Model Higher Secondary School Vettikavala
- Govt High School Thalachira
- Govt Higher Secondary School Sadanandapuram
- Govt high school chakkuvarakkal
- D Krishnan Potti Memorial High School Kottavattom
- Travancore Devaswom Board School Vettikavala
- Mar baselios ocean star public school Chirattakonam
- SDA school Karickom
- Karickam international public school
- Aala achan memorial English medium school Thalachira
- Younus polytechnic college Thalachira

== Transportation ==
=== Road ===
State-run KSRTC buses are the primary form of transportation. The village is well connected to Kottarakkara, Kokkadu, Thalachira, Chakkuvarakkal and Punalur through frequent bus services. Three daily KSRTC Fast Passenger bus services ensure connectivity to neighboring districts of Pathanamthitta and Thiruvananthapuram.

- Kollam - Tirumangalam NH 744 passes through Chengamanad which is situated 2 km away.
- Pathanapuram - Valakom (Mc road) Sabarimala Bypass pass through Vettikkavala.
- Kadakkal-Chengamanad road is another important road passing through Vettikkavala that connects Vettikkavala with Anchal.

=== Rail and Air ===
The Kottarakara and Avaneeswaram railway stations, located on the Kollam-Sengottai railway line, are the nearest stations. Both of them are 8 km from Vettikkavala. However, Vettikkavala is better connected with Kottarakkara railway station through public transportation. The nearest airport is Trivandrum International Airport (68 km).

== See also ==
- Kollam
