= P. Aisha Potty =

Indian politician

Aisha Potty
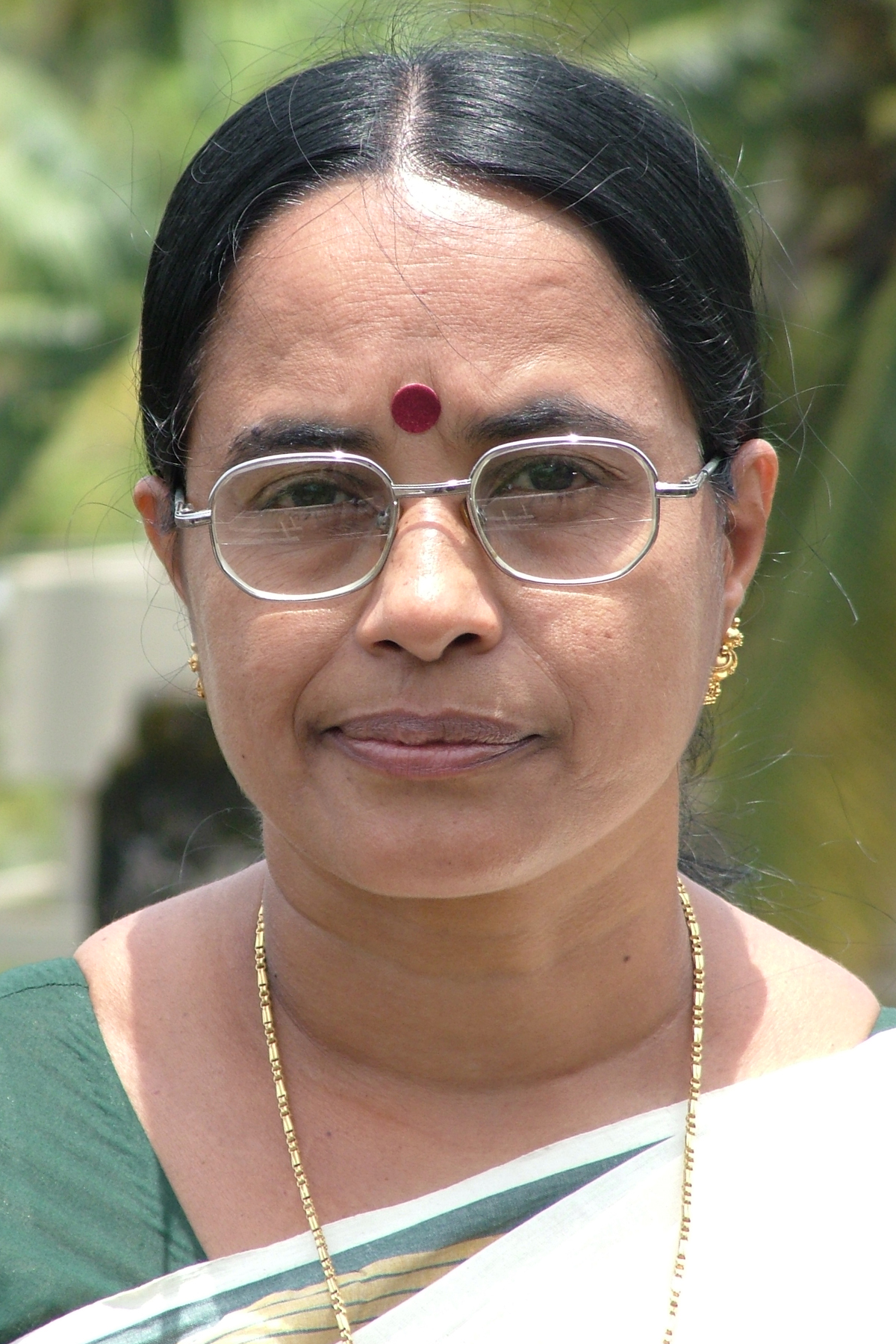
- Ex kottarakara mla

Member of Legislative Assembly, Kerala
- In office 11 May 2006 – 24 May 2021
- Preceded by: R. Balakrishna Pillai
- Succeeded by: K. N. Balagopal
- Constituency: Kottarakkara

Personal details
- Born: 31 May 1955 (age 71) Kottarakkara, Kollam
- Party: Indian National Congress (2026–present)
- Other political affiliations: Communist Party of India (Marxist) (–2026)
- Spouse: E. Sankaran Potty
- Children: Resmi Sankar, Sooraj Sankar
- Education: Government Law College, Thiruvananthapuram

P. Aisha Potty is an Indian politician and former MLA of Kottarakkara. Daughter of Shri N. Vasudevan Potty and Smt. N.J. Parvathy Antharjanam, Aisha Potty is a member of All India Lawyers Union (AILU) National Council and treasurer of AILU Kerala Council . She is also the convener of State Women’s Sub Committee. She won the 2016 assembly election with a huge majority of more than 42,000 votes. She holds a master's degree in Law (LLM).
