= Kalayapuram =

- village
- Location in Kerala, India Kalayapuram (India)
- Coordinates: 9°3′16.1″N 76°46′10.6″E
- Country: India
- State: Kerala
- District: Kollam

Population (2011)
  - Total: 20,233

Languages
  - Official: Malayalam, English
- Time zone: UTC+5:30 (IST)
- PIN: 691560
- Telephone code: 91 474 26XXXXX
- Vehicle registration: KL-24
- Nearest city: Kollam
- Lok Sabha constituency: Mavelikkara
- Vidhan Sabha constituency: Kottarakara

Kalayapuram is a village in Kollam district in the state of Kerala, India.

== Demographics ==
As of 2011 India census, Kalayapuram had a population of 20233 with 9449 males and 10784 females.
