= Veliyam =

- Village
- Interactive map of Veliyam
- Coordinates: 8°55′0″N 76°46′0″E
- Country: India
- State: Kerala
- District: Kollam

Government
  - Body: Panchayat

Languages
  - Official: Malayalam
- Time zone: UTC+5:30 (IST)
- Vehicle registration: KL-24

Veliyam is a village in Kerala, India. It is situated near Kottarakara in the Kollam district of Kerala.
