= Kareepra =

- village
- Location in Kerala, India Kareepra (India)
- Coordinates: 8°57′0″N 76°43′0″E
- Country: India
- State: Kerala
- District: Kollam

Population (2011)
  - Total: 30,099

Languages
  - Official: Malayalam, English
- Time zone: UTC+5:30 (IST)
- Postal code: 691505
- Telephone code: 0474
- Vehicle registration: KL-24
- Nearest city: Kottarakkara
- Sex ratio: 1032 ♂/♀
- Literacy: 100%%
- Lok Sabha constituency: mavelikara (17km)
- Vidhan Sabha constituency: Kottarakkara

Kareepra is a village near Edakkidom in Kollam district in the state of Kerala, India.

== Demographics ==
As of 2011 India census, Kareepra had a population of 30,099 with 14,090 males and 16,009 females.
