= Kottukkal =

Kottukkal Manjippuzha
- Village
- Location in Kerala, India Kottukkal (India)
- Coordinates: 8°53′0″N 76°54′0″E
- Country: India
- State: Kerala
- District: Kollam

Population (2011)
  - Total: 18,400

Languages
  - Official: Malayalam, English
- Time zone: UTC+5:30 (IST)
- PIN: 691306
- Telephone code: 0475
- Vehicle registration: KL-24

Kottukkal is a village in Kollam district of Kerala, India. The historical importance of the village is linked to Kottukal cave temple, built before 800 CE. The village comes under Ittiva panchayath and it is the most prominent town in this panchayath. The village has many libraries such as Safder Hashmi library and Kairaly library. Attractions include the district agricultural farm. Ancient temples here include more than 6 temples surrendered in 3 kilometers of Kottukkal, such as the Cave temple.

== Demographics ==
As of 2011 India census, Kottukkal had a population of 18400 with 8588 males and 9812 females.
