= Kottarakkara =

- Municipal Town
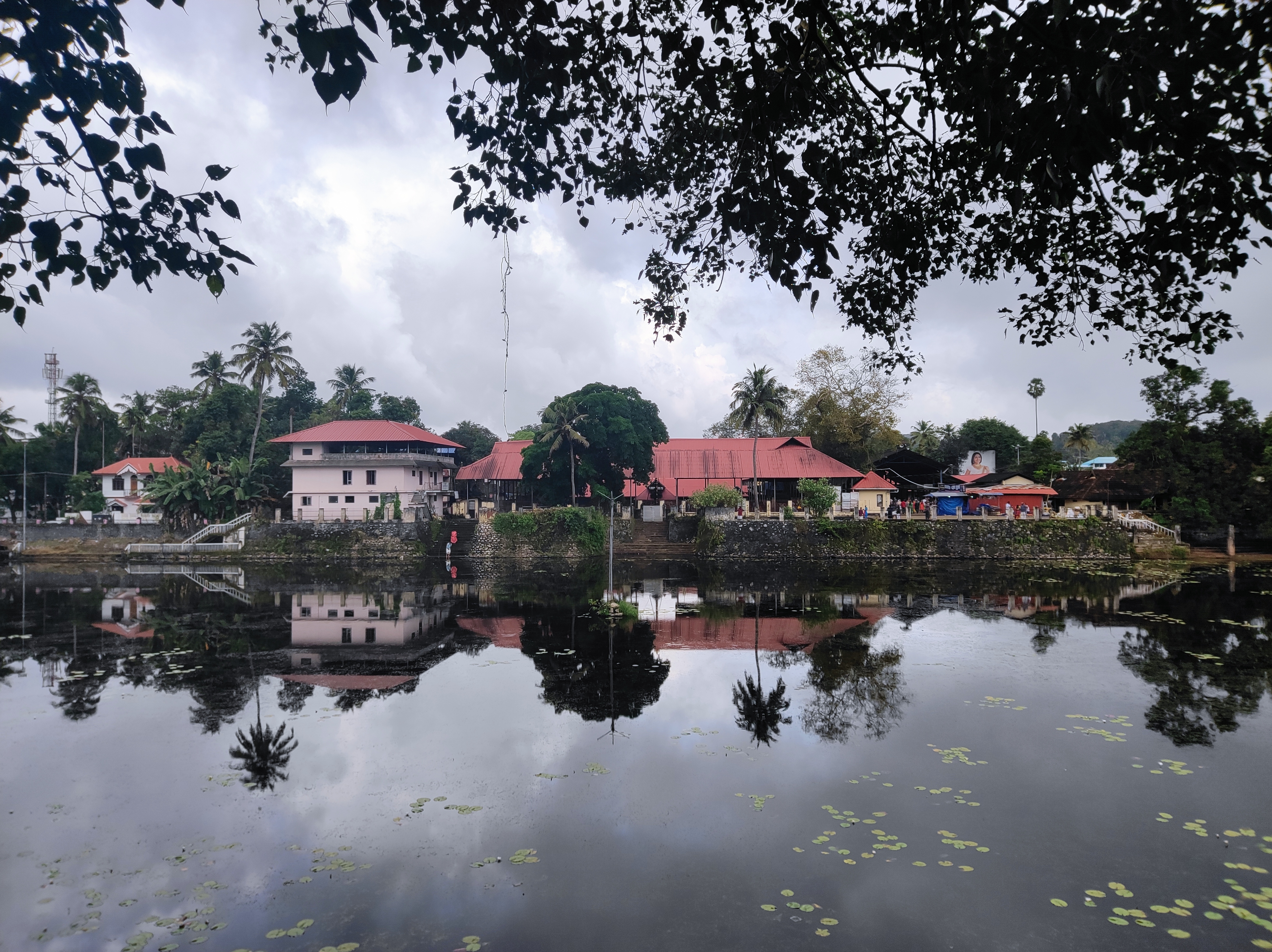
- Kottarakkara Sree Mahaganapathi Temple

- Location in Kerala, India Kottarakkara (India)
- Coordinates: 08°59′00″N 76°46′00″E
- Country: India
- State: Kerala
- District: Kollam

Government
  - Type: Council
  - Body: Kottarakkara Municipality
  - MP: Kodikunnil Suresh
  - MLA: K.N.Balagopal

Area
  - Total: 17.39 km^{2} (6.71 sq mi)

Population
  - Total: 29,788
  - Density: 1,713/km^{2} (4,436/sq mi)

Languages
  - Official: Malayalam, English
- Time zone: UTC+5:30 (IST)
- PINCODE: 691506
- Vehicle registration: KL-24
- Nearest city: Kollam
- Civic Agency: Kottarakara Municipality

Kottarakkara (IAST: Koṭṭārakkara), also transliterated as Kottarakara, is a town and municipality in the Kollam district of Kerala, India. Kottarakkara lies 27 kilometres (17 mi) to the east of Kollam city centre.

== History ==
Kottarakkara, also known in the ancient days of the kings as the Elayadathu Swarupam, was a principality ruled by a branch of the Travancore Royal Family, later the kingdom collapsed and some elite Nair royals settled in the Thrikkannamangal region of Kottarakkara. It is the home of Kathakali, a well known dance drama which originated initially as Ramanattam created in the 17th century by Prince Kottarakkara Thampuran and later patronized by the Raja of Kottarakkara in the early 19th century absorbing other dance forms of Krishnanattam with further innovations.

== Etymology ==
Kottarakkara, is a compound word made up of the words Kottaram, meaning "palace", and kara meaning "land", literally means "land of palaces". The area which had several palaces was thus named "Kottarakkara."

== Geography ==
Kottarakkara is a small municipality and taluk headquarters, close to Kollam. The taluk has six panchayats and other small towns. It is surrounded by several other towns.

=== Revenue villages in Kottarakara Taluk ===
According to the Kollam district website, there are 27 villages in Kottarakara Taluk. These are:-

- Chadayamangalam
- Chakkuvarakkal
- Chithara
- Elamad
- Ezhukone
- Ittiva
- Kadakkal
- Kalayapuram
- Kareepra
- Kottarakkara
- Kottukkal
- Kulakkada
- Kummil
- Mankode
- Melila
- Mylam
- Neduvathur
- Nilamel
- Odanavattom
- Pavithreswaram
- Pooyappally
- Puthurv
- Ummannur
- Valakom
- Velinallur
- Veliyam
- Vettikkavala

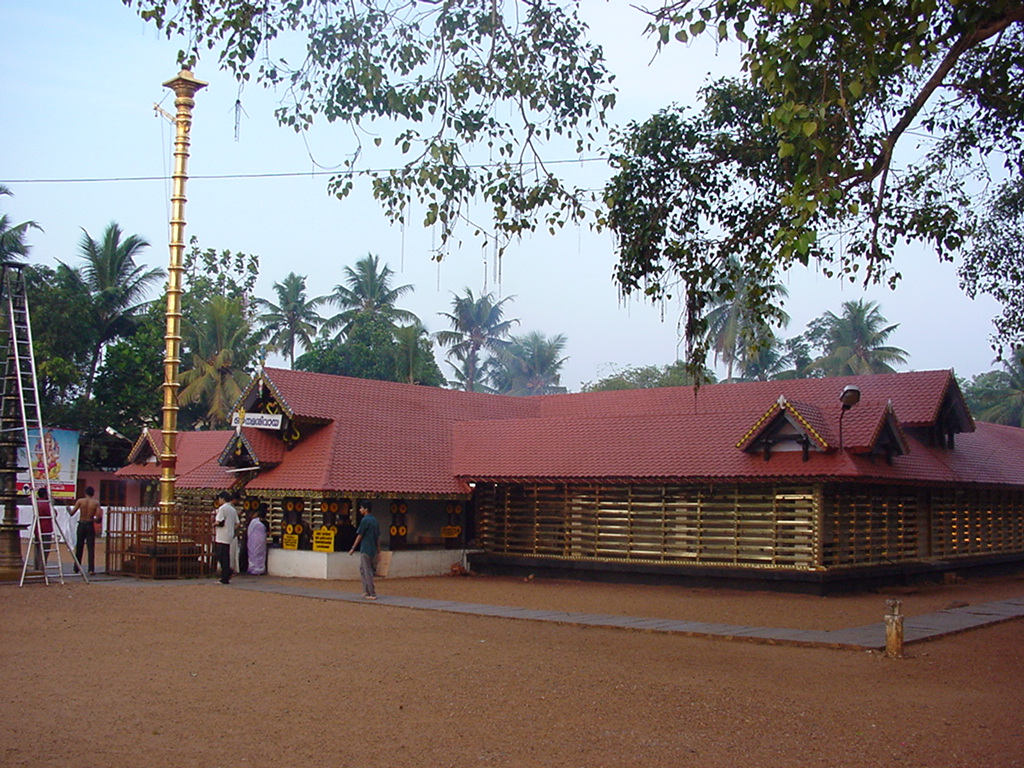
Kottarakkara Sree Mahaganapathi Kshethram

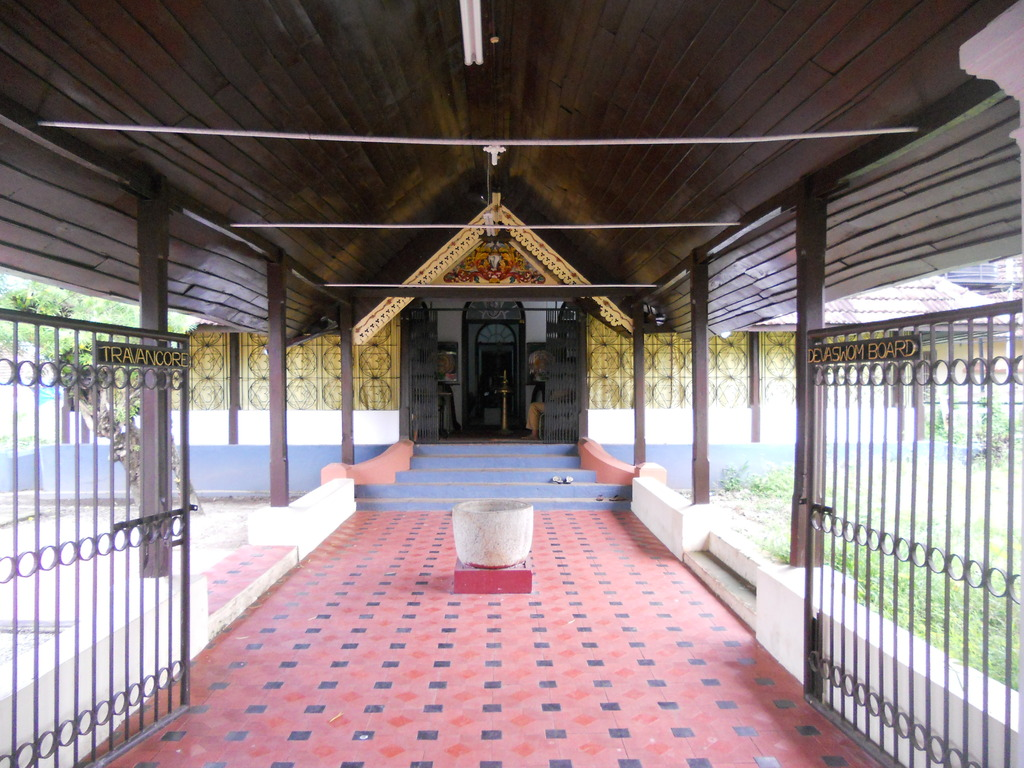
Kottarakkara Thampuran Memorial Museum of Classical Arts

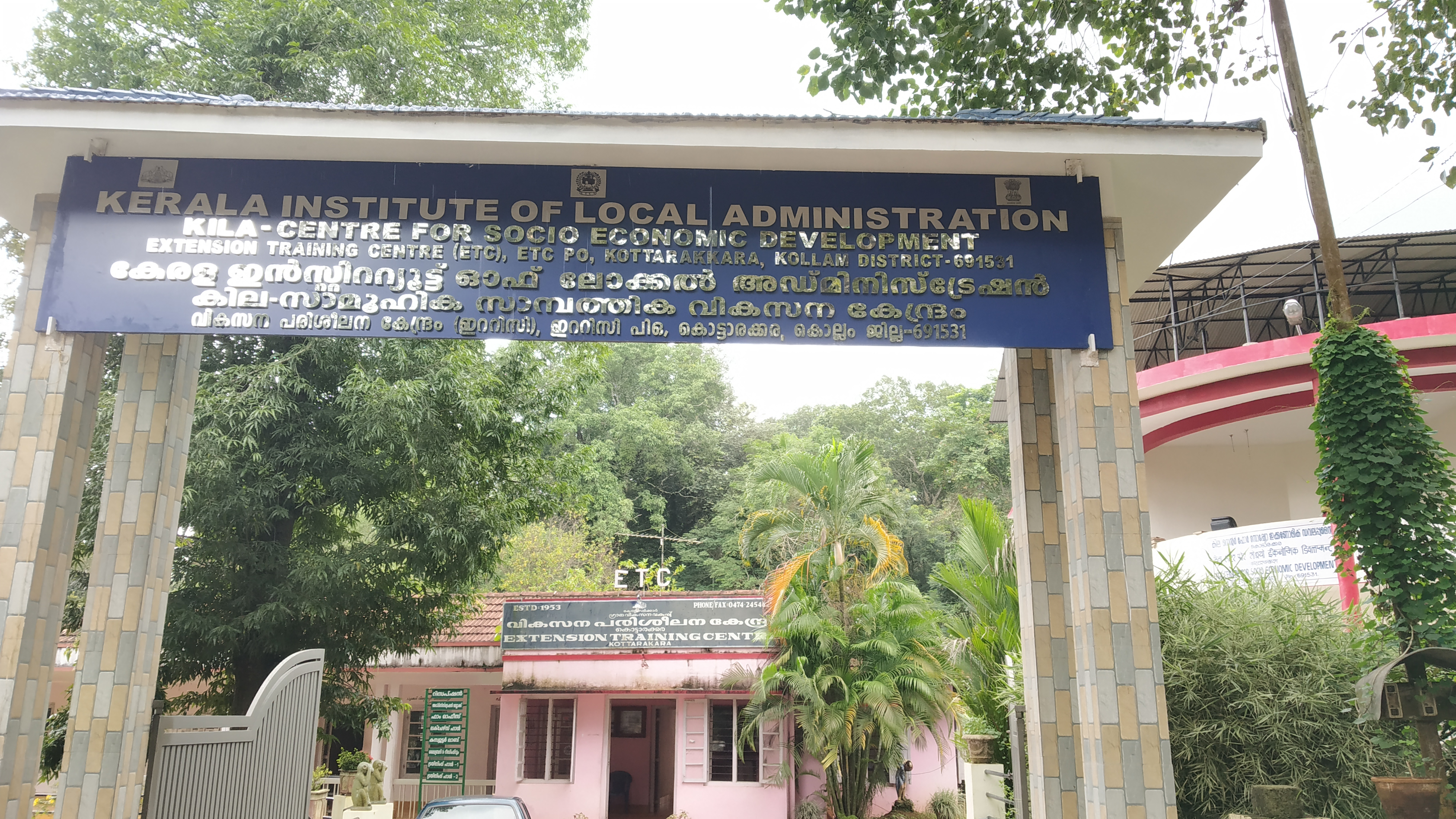
Kottarakara centre of KILA

=== Climate ===
Climate data for Kottarakkara, Kerala
Month	Jan	Feb	Mar	Apr	May	Jun	Jul	Aug	Sep	Oct	Nov	Dec	Year
Mean daily maximum °C (°F)	30.4 (86.7)	31.2 (88.2)	32.3 (90.1)	32.4 (90.3)	32.0 (89.6)	29.9 (85.8)	29.3 (84.7)	29.5 (85.1)	29.9 (85.8)	29.8 (85.6)	29.5 (85.1)	29.8 (85.6)	30.5 (86.9)
Mean daily minimum °C (°F)	22.4 (72.3)	23.1 (73.6)	24.5 (76.1)	25.3 (77.5)	25.4 (77.7)	24.1 (75.4)	23.6 (74.5)	23.6 (74.5)	23.8 (74.8)	23.8 (74.8)	23.4 (74.1)	22.6 (72.7)	23.8 (74.8)
Average precipitation mm (inches)	17 (0.7)	34 (1.3)	67 (2.6)	166 (6.5)	261 (10.3)	477 (18.8)	411 (16.2)	277 (10.9)	228 (9.0)	311 (12.2)	214 (8.4)	54 (2.1)	2,517 (99)
Source: Climate-Data.org

== Culture ==
Kottarakkara is regarded as the birthplace of Kathakali, the classical dance-drama of Kerala. The art form is believed to have originated in the 17th century when Prince Kottarakkara Thampuran composed several plays and developed it as an alternative to Krishnattam of Guruvayur. Kathakali later evolved into one of the major cultural symbols of Kerala.

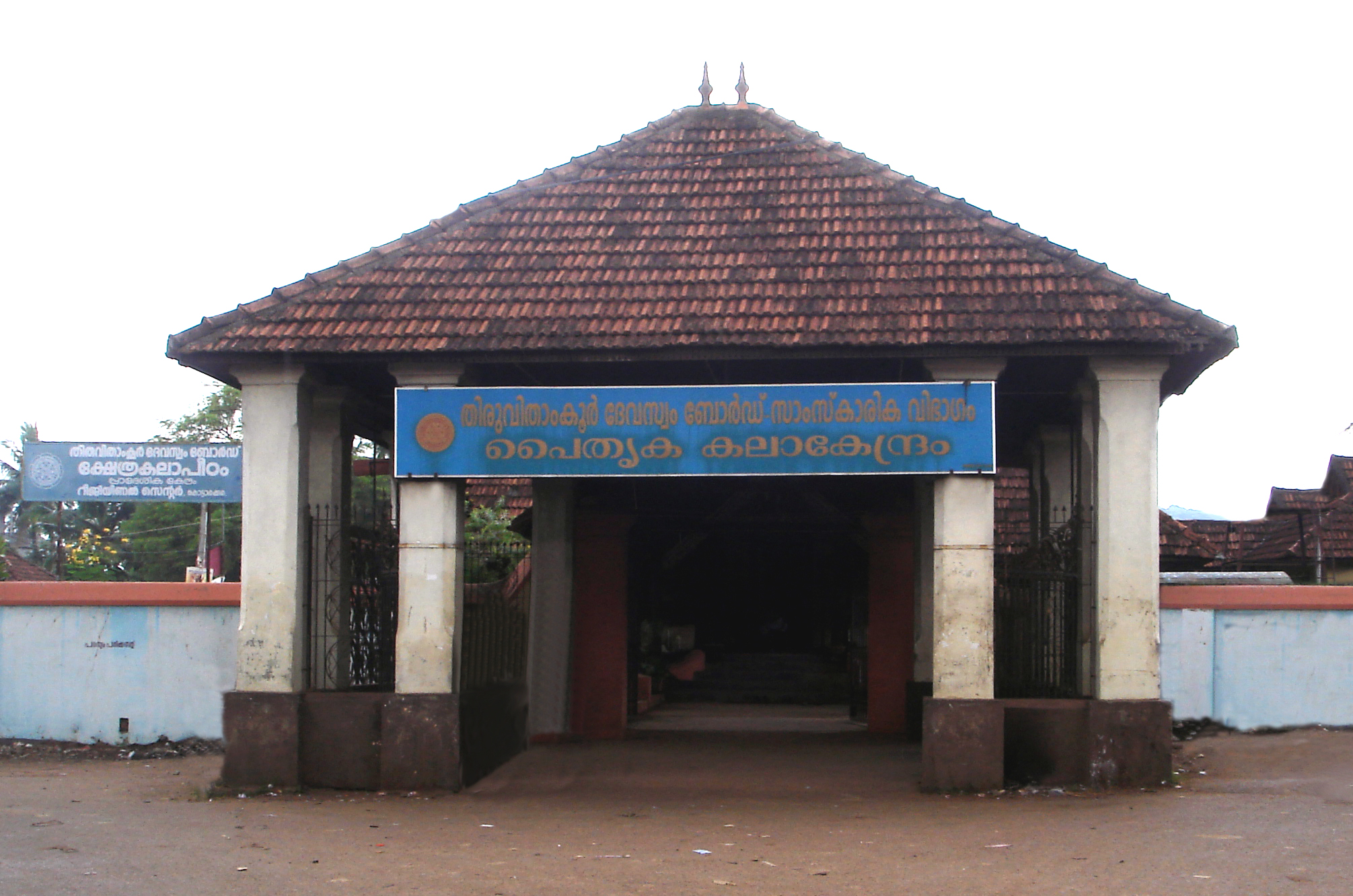
Kottarakkara Palace

== Tourist attractions ==
- Kottarakkara Sree Mahaganapathy Temple – a famous pilgrimage centre known for its Ganapathi idol and the tradition of offering unniyappam as prasadam.
- Kottarakkara Palace – historic palace associated with the royal family of Kottarakkara and closely linked to the origin of Kathakali.

== Politics ==
Kottarakara Assembly Constituency is one among the 11 assembly constituencies in Kollam district. K. N. Balagopal is the present MLA from Kottarakkara constituency. Kottarakkara comes under Mavelikkara (Lok Sabha constituency)(previously it was in Adoor Loksabha constituency) that represents a large area including Kottarakkara, Mavelikkara, Changanasseri, spread in Kollam, Alappuzha and Kottayam districts.

E Chandrasekaran Nair (CPI), D.Damodaran Potti (PSP), R.Balakrishna Pillai (Kerala Congress), E.Chandrasekaran Nair (CPI), C.Achutha Menon (CPI), Kottara Gopalakrishnan (INC) and R.Balakrishna Pillai (Kerala Congress - B),P. Aisha Potty (CPM) are the former elected members represented Kottarakara Assembly Constituency in the past.

== Notable people ==
- Veliyam Bharghavan, Former General Secretary, Communist Party of India
- Bobby Kottarakkara, Malayalam actor
- K. B. Ganesh Kumar, actor and politician
- Sai Kumar, Malayalam actor
- Kottarakkara Sreedharan Nair (1922–1986), actor
- R. Balakrishna Pillai, former Minister, MLA, MP and Panchayat President, Chairman of the Kerala Congress
- P. Aisha Potty, MLA
- Salim Yusuf - Physician, cardiologist and epidemiologist
