= Kulakkada =

- village
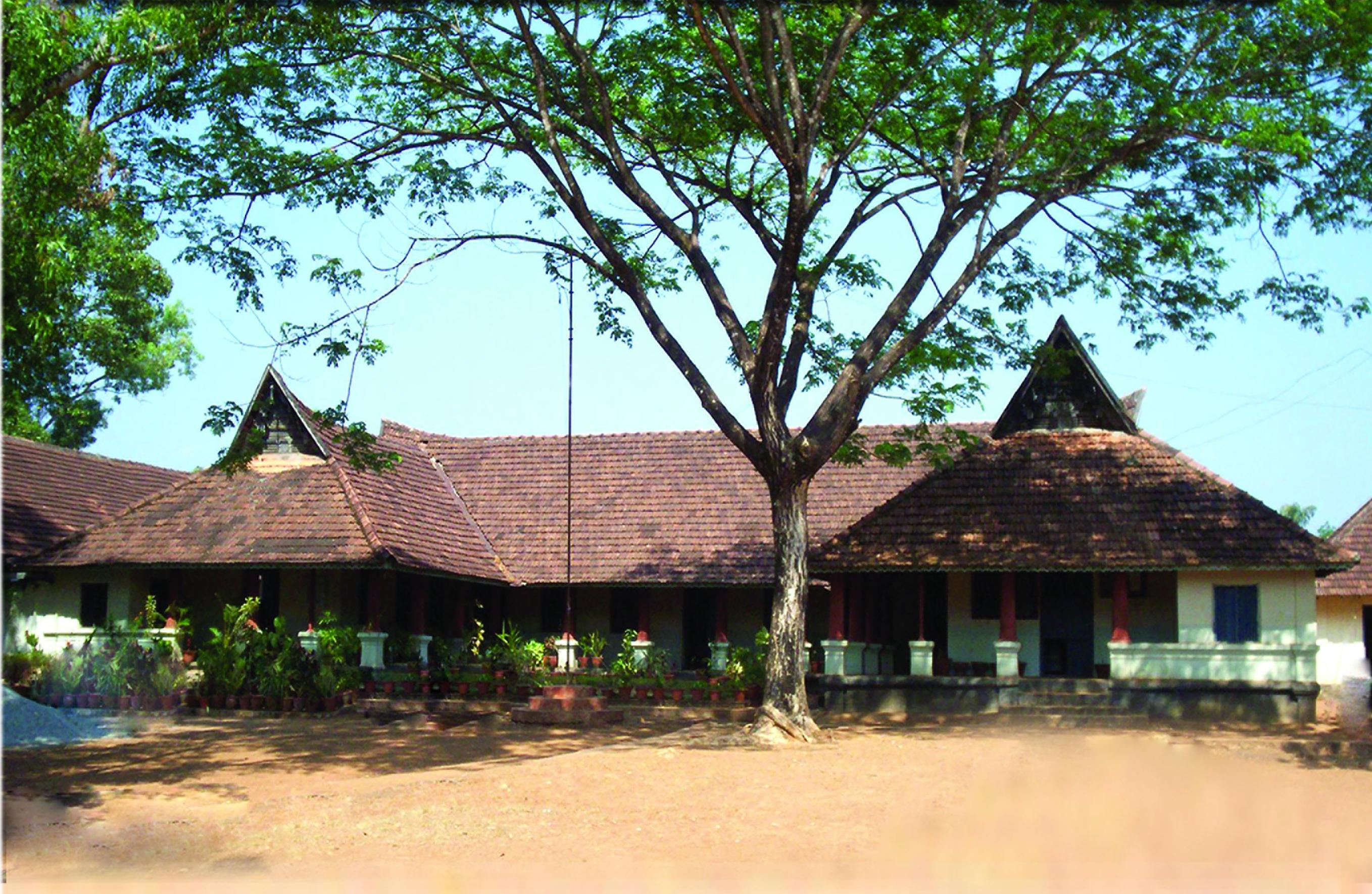
- Government Highschool
- Interactive map of Kulakkada
- Coordinates: 9°4′0″N 76°45′0″E
- Country: India
- State: Kerala
- District: Kollam

Government
  - Body: Gram panchayat

Population (2011)
  - Total: 15,148

Languages
  - Official: Malayalam, English
- Time zone: UTC+5:30 (IST)
- PIN: 691521
- Telephone code: 0474-26*****
- Vehicle registration: KL-24
- Nearest city: Kollam

Kulakkada is a village in Kollam district in the state of Kerala, India.

Kulakkada is also a panchayat headquartered in Mavadi. The main towns in Kulakkada panchayath are Kulakkada, Puthoor, and Poovattoor. The Thiruvananthapuram–Angamaly M.C. road passes through Kulakkada. This village is situated at the bank of the Kallada River.

== Demographics ==
As of 2011 India census, Kulakkada had a population of 15,148, with 7,222 males and 7,926 females.

== Schools and colleges ==
- Govt VHSS Kulakkada
- Govt LP School Kulakkada
- Kerala University CTE Kulakkada
- DVUP School Thazhathu Kulakkada
- DVLP School Thazhathu kulakkada
- GWLP School Kuttara

== Church ==
- CGI Kulakkada (Church of God(Full Gospel) in India), Thiruthilambalam)
- St Thomas Mar Thomas Church, Malappara
- St Gregorious Orthodox Church, EarthuKulakkada
- St George Orthodox Valiyapally, Thuruthilambalam
- Evangelical church, Thuruthilambalam
