= Velinalloor =

- village
- Location in Kerala, India Velinalloor (India)
- Coordinates: 8°51′0″N 76°46′0″E
- Country: India
- State: Kerala
- District: Kollam

Population (2011)
  - Total: 28,864

Languages
  - Official: Malayalam, English
- Time zone: UTC+5:30 (IST)
- Vehicle registration: KL-

Velinalloor is a village in Kollam district in the state of Kerala, India.

== Demographics ==
As of 2011 India census, Velinalloor had a population of 28864 with 13499 males and 15365 females.
