= Thirupullabhoothangudi Temple =

Hindu temple in Tamil Nadu

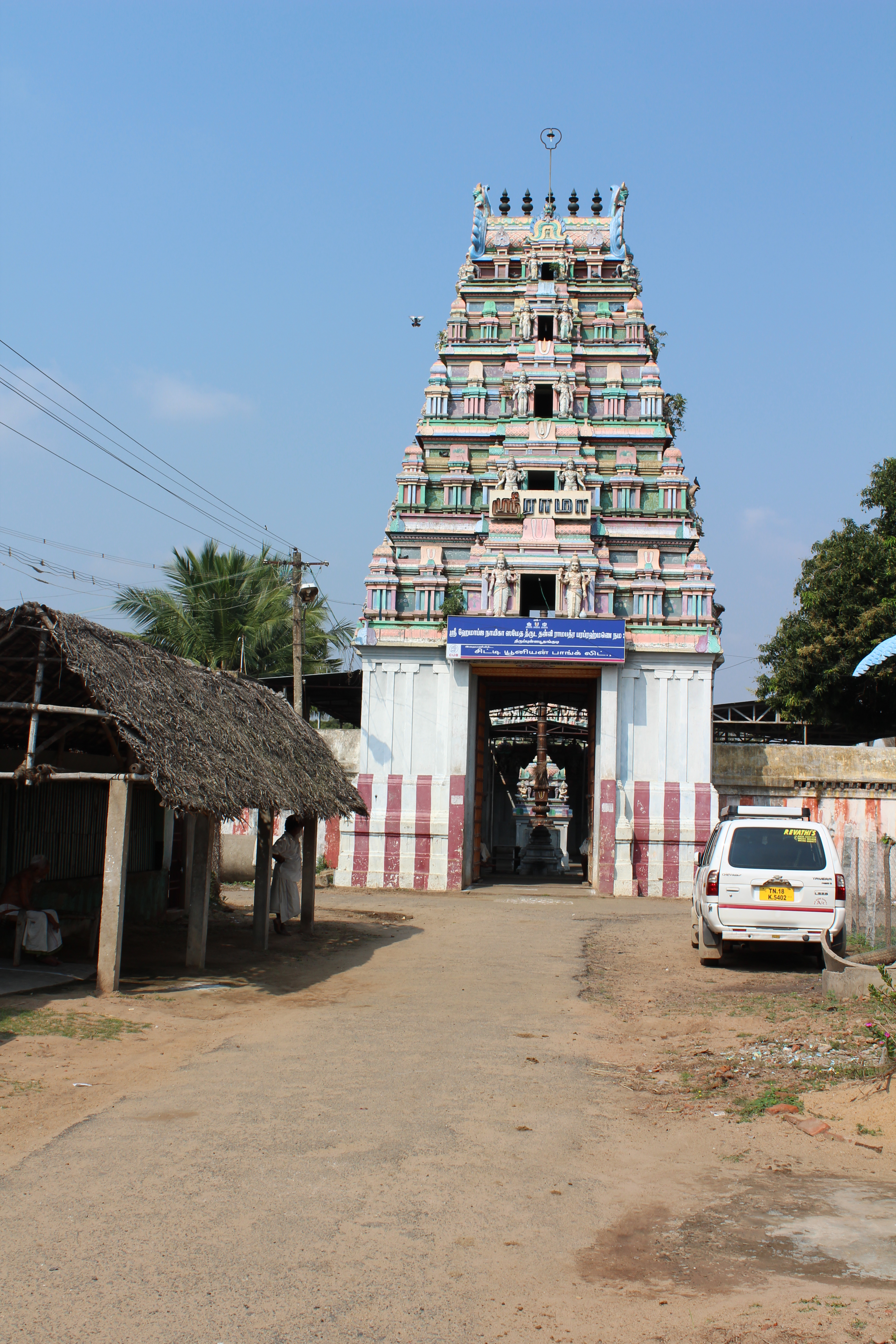

- Location in Tamil Nadu

Religion
- Affiliation: Hinduism
- District: Tanjore
- Deity: Valvil Ramar (Vishnu); Potramaraiyal (Lakshmi)
- Features: Tower: Sopana; Temple tank: Jatayu

Location
- Location: Pullabhoothangudi, Kumbakonam
- State: Tamil Nadu
- Country: India
- Coordinates: 10°58′17″N 79°18′12″E

Architecture
- Type: Dravidian architecture

Thirupullabhoothangudi Temple is a Hindu temple dedicated to Vishnu located in Pullabhoothangudi near Kumbakonam in the South Indian state of Tamil Nadu. Constructed in South Indian Style of Architecture, the temple is glorified in the Nalayira Divya Prabandham, the early medieval Tamil canon of the Alvar saints from the 6th–9th centuries CE. It is counted as one among the 108 Divya Desams dedicated to Vishnu. Vishnu is worshiped as Valvil Ramar and his consort Lakshmi as Sita.

The temple has a small shrine with Vimanam and five-tier rajagopuram. The temple was built by Medieval Cholas with additions from later kings. The temple is located in Pulla Bhoothangudi, a small village, 8 km away from Kumbakonam and 3 km from Swamimalai. The temple tank is located north of the temple.

Kolavalli Ramar is believed to have appeared for Sita and the temple is believed to be the place where Rama performed the last rites of the eagle king Jatayu. The temple has six daily rituals at various times from 7:30 a.m. to 8 p.m., and four yearly festivals on its calendar. Vaikuntha Ekadashi celebrated during the Tamil month of Margali (December–January) is the major festival celebrated in the temple.

== Legend ==
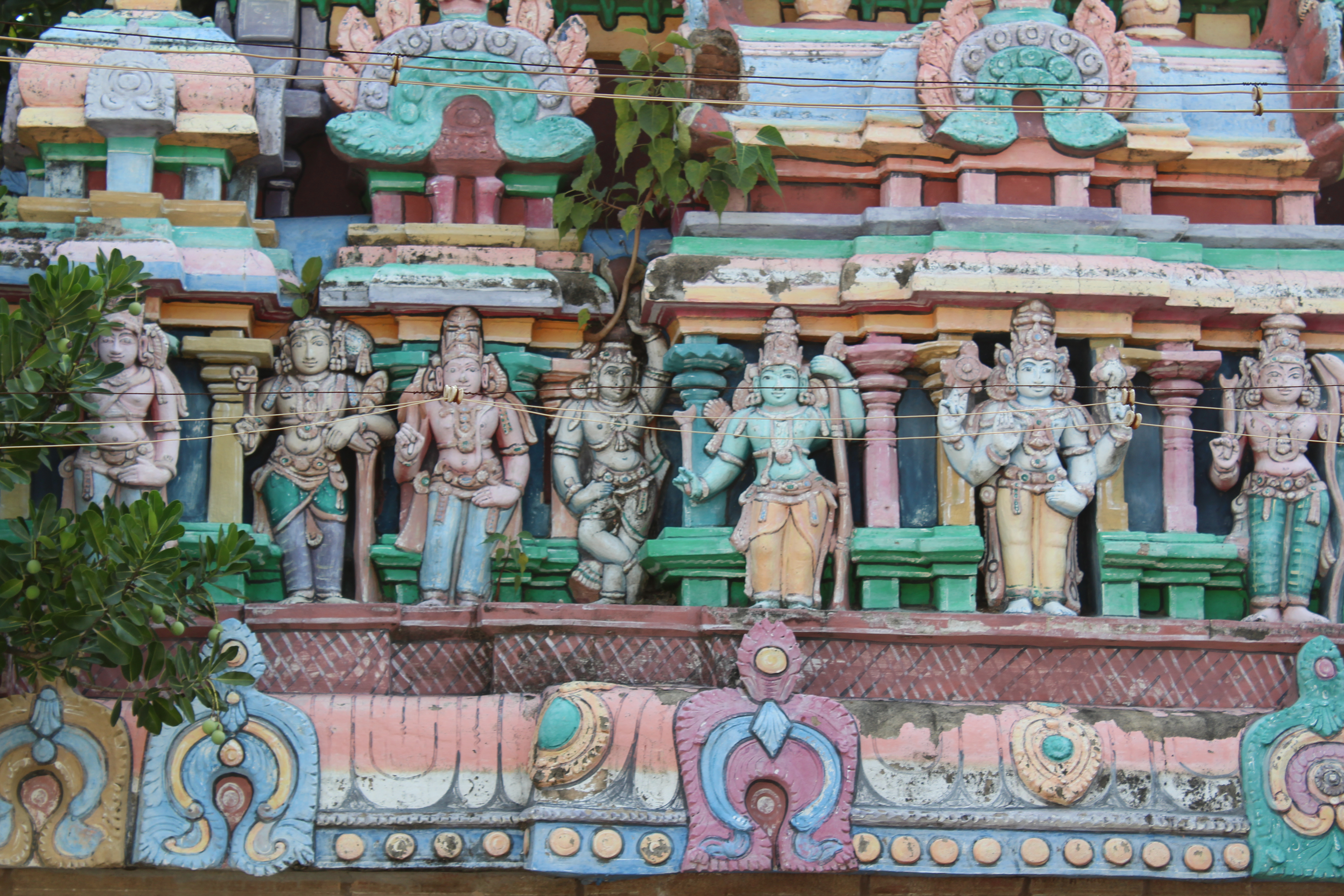
Image of Rama in the temple gopuram

The Brahmanda Purana and Padma Purana detail the sthala purana of the temple. In the Ramayana, Ravana, the rakshasa king abducted Sita, the wife of Rama during their exile in a forest. Jatayu, the eagle king, fought a valiant battle with Ravana who had taken Sita captive in the Pushpaka Vimana. Jatayu was severely injured in the battle and fell down to the ground. Jatayu was able to narrate the events to Rama who was in search of Sita. Jatayu died after narrating the events and Rama performed the rites. As per Hindu customs, the wife of the individual performing the final rites has to accompany him. Since Sita was not present, Bhumadevi appeared to accompany Rama from a golden lotus. The same legend is associated with Vijayaraghava Perumal temple in Thiruputkuzhi King Krita is believed to have worshiped Vishnu here.

== Architecture ==
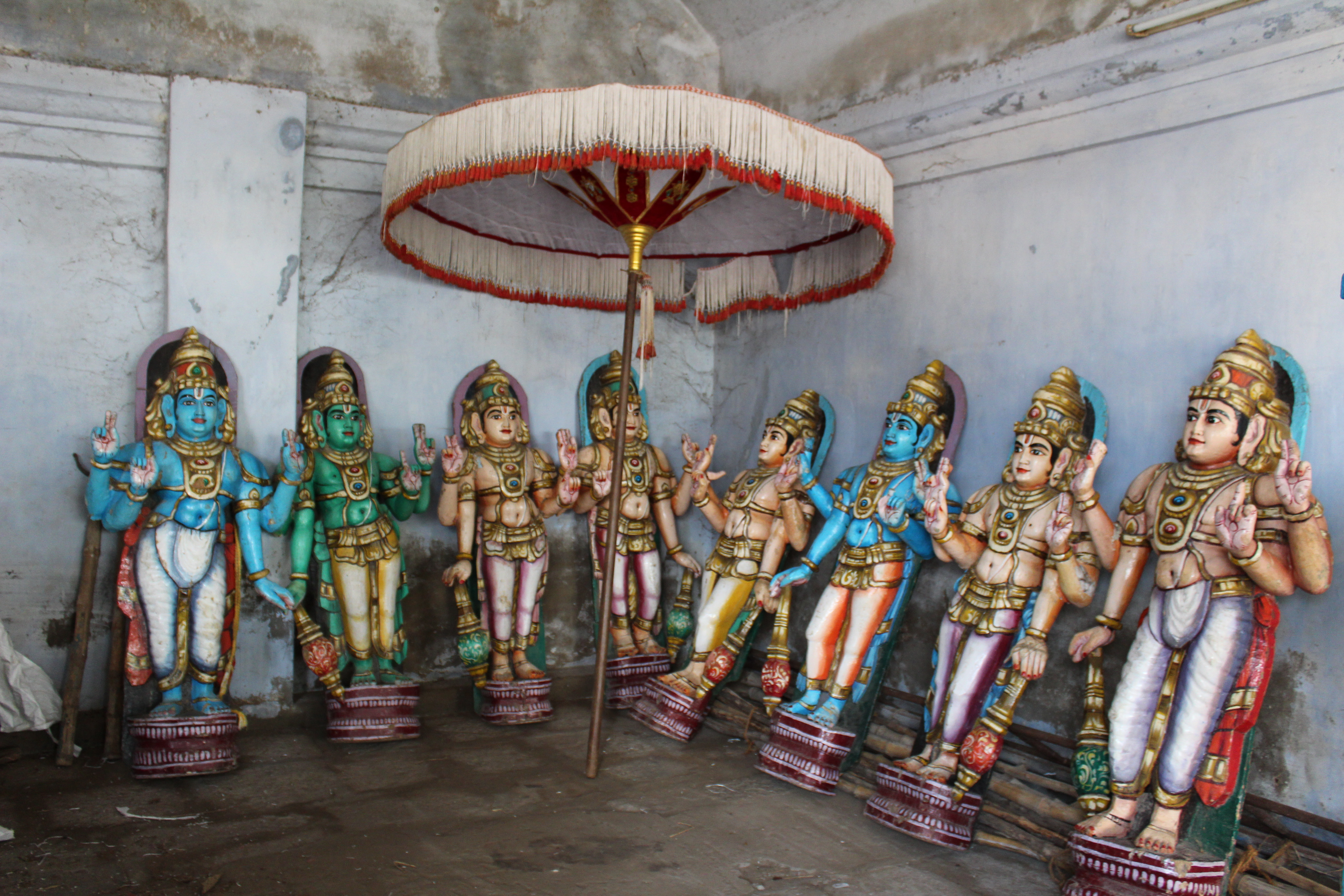
Images of the festive mounts

The temple has a small shrine with Vimanam and five-tier rajagopuram. It is located in Pullabhoothangudi, a small village, 8 km away from Kumbakonam and 1 km from Thiru Aadanoor Temple. The temple tank is located north of the temple.

== Religious importance ==
The temple is revered in Nalayira Divya Prabandham, the 7th–9th century Vaishnava canon, by Kulasekhara Alvar in one hymn. The temple is classified as a Divya Desam, one of the 108 Vishnu temples that are mentioned in the book. Thirumangai Alvar has also revered the temple in his verses. The temple is the only place where Rama is sported with four hands, with two of the hands holding conch and chakra.

== Festivals and religious practices ==
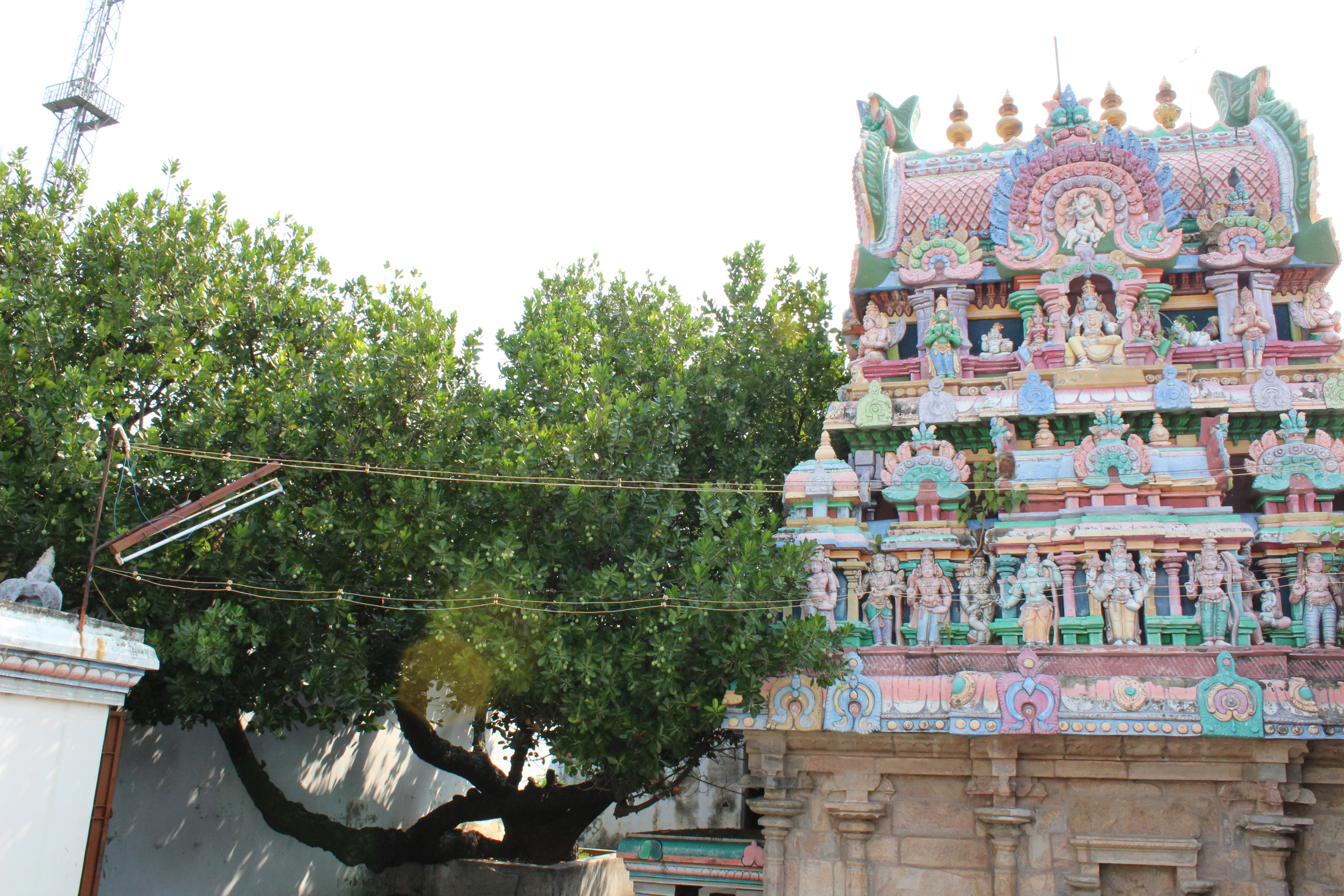
The vimana of the temple

The temple follows Pancharatra Agama and the worship practises are carried out by hereditary priests. The temple also follows the Vadakalai tradition, specifically the traditions of Ahobila Mutt. The temple priests perform the pooja (rituals) during festivals and on a daily basis. As at other Vishnu temples of Tamil Nadu, the priests belong to the Vaishnavaite community, from the Brahmin varna. The temple is currently administered by Sri Ahobila Mutt. The temple rituals are performed six times a day: Ushathkalam at 7 a.m., Kalasanthi at 8:00 a.m., Uchikalam at 12:00 p.m., Sayarakshai at 5:00 p.m., Irandamkalam at 6:00 p.m. and Ardha Jamam at 7:30 p.m. Each ritual has three steps: alankaaram (decoration), neivedyam (food offering) and deepa aradanai (waving of lamps) for both Vijayaraghava Perumal and Maragathavalli. During the last step of worship, nagaswaram (pipe instrument) and tavil (percussion instrument) are played, religious instructions in the Vedas (sacred text) are recited by priests, and worshippers prostrate themselves in front of the temple mast. There are weekly, monthly and fortnightly rituals performed in the temple. Vaikuntha Ekadashi, celebrated during the Tamil month of Margali (December–January) is the major festival celebrated in the temple.
