= Vijayaraghava Perumal temple =

Vishnu temple in Kanchipuram

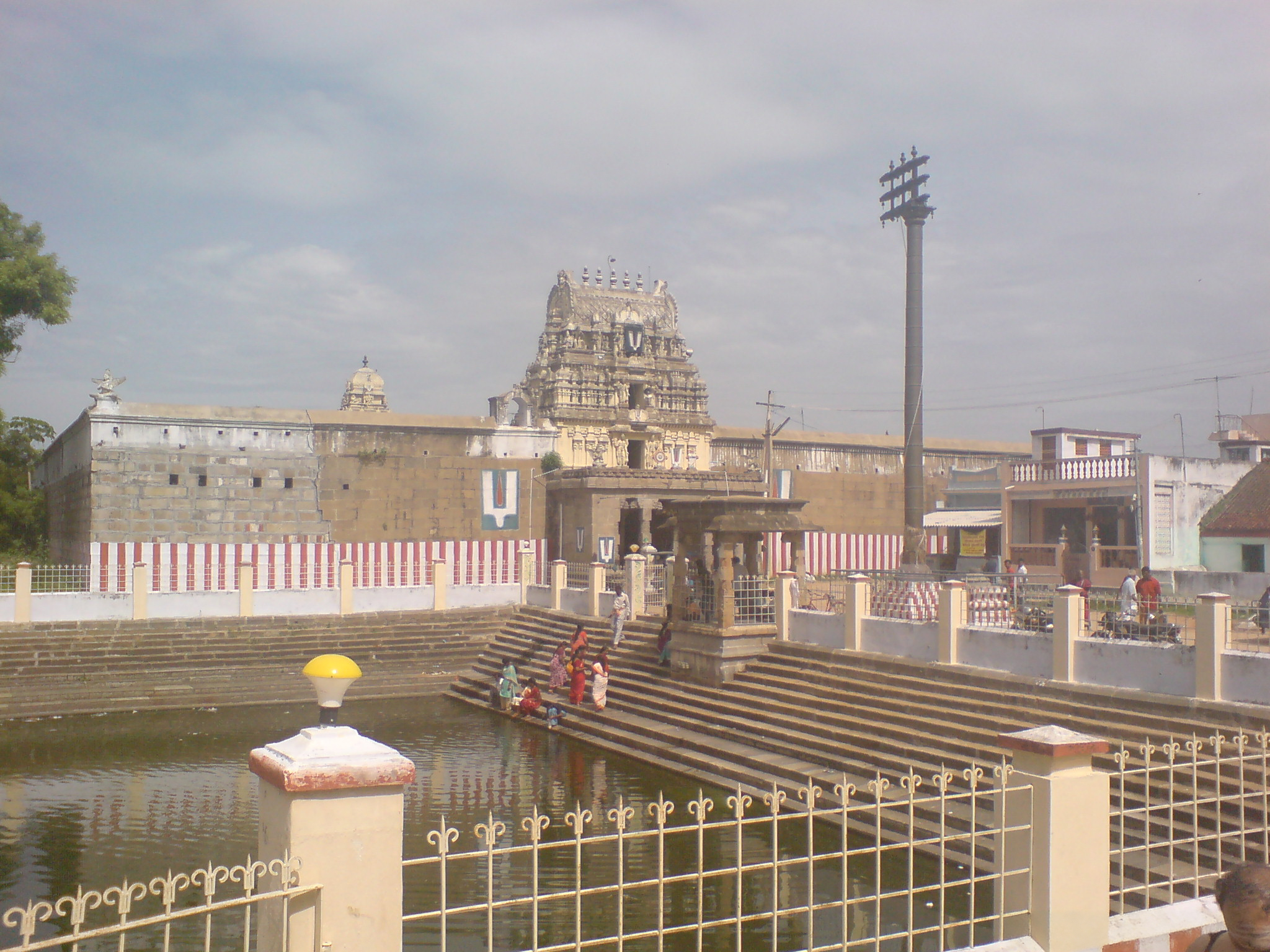

- Location in Tamil Nadu

Religion
- Affiliation: Hinduism
- District: Kanchipuram
- Deity: Vijayaraghavaswamy (Vishnu) Margathavalli Thayar (Lakshmi)

Location
- Location: Tamil Nadu, India
- State: Tamil Nadu
- Country: India
- Coordinates: 12°52′21″N 79°37′08″E

Architecture
- Type: Dravidian architecture

Vijayaraghava Perumal temple is a Vishnu temple in Thirupputkuzhi, a village in Kanchipuram district in Tamil Nadu, India. It is situated about 7 miles west of Kanchipuram and half a kilometre from Baluchetti Chattiram, which lies on the Chennai - Vellore highway. Constructed in Dravidian style of architecture, the temple is glorified in the Naalayira Divya Prabandham, the early medieval Tamil canon of the Alvar saints from the 6th–9th centuries CE. It is counted as one among the 108 Divya Desams dedicated to Vishnu. Vishnu is worshiped as Vijayaraghava Perumal and his consort Lakshmi as Maragathavalli Thayar.

The temple is believed to be of significant antiquity and is believed to be initiated by the Pandyas, with later contributions at different times from Cholas and Thanjavur Nayaks. The temple has three inscriptions dating from the Chola period. The temple has a five-tiered rajagopuram (gateway tower) and enshrined within a granite wall. The complex contains all the shrines while the temple tank, is located to the west of the temple. The Brahmotsavam festival celebrated in the Tamil month of Masi (February - March), Theppotsavam (float festival) in Thai (January - February) are the major festivals celebrated in the temple.

== Architecture ==
The temple is believed to have been built by the Pandya kings during the 13th century, as seen from the stone inscriptions in the temple. The temple here is one among the 108 Divya Desams and is dedicated to Vijayaraghavaswamy (Mulavar). There is a separate temple for Thayar in the form of Margathavalli Thayar and a sannidhi for Sri Ramanuja. The central shrine houses the image of the presiding deity, Vijayaraghava sported with four hands. He is seen in a posture holding the demigod bird Jatayu and performing the last rites. Sridevi and Bhudevi are sported along with their head facing earth. It is believed that the image is sported to indicate sorrow on the faces. Sridevi who is usually sported on the right side of Perumal is located to his left in this temple probably because of the sorrow created by the death of Jatayu. Ramanuja, the preceptor of Visishtadvaita philosophy had his early education at this temple.

== Legend ==
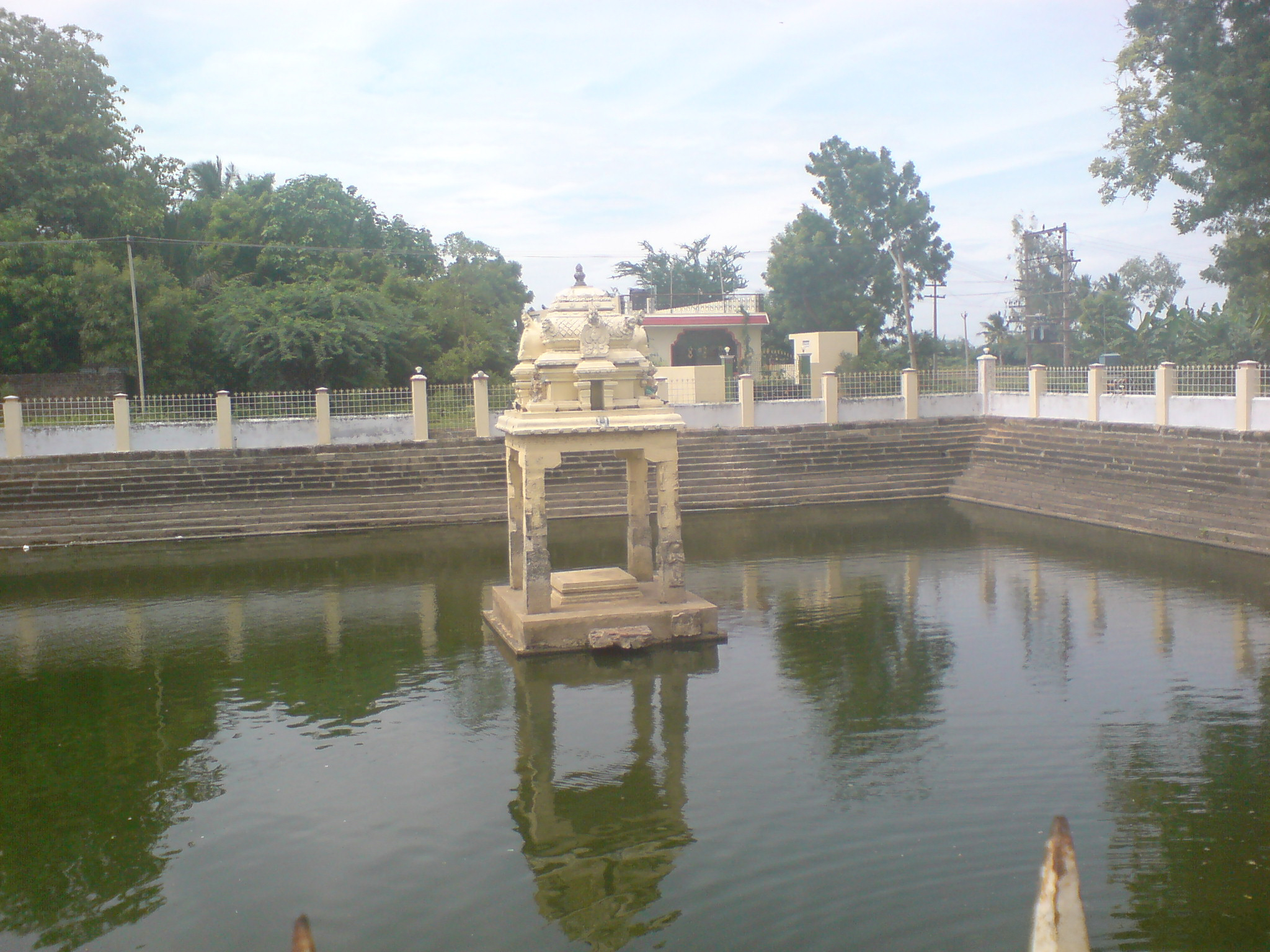
Temple Tank

Jatayu, the demigod bird of the Ramayana, was killed by the rakshasa king Ravana, while trying to save Sita during the abduction. Rama, the avatar of Vishnu and the hero of the Ramayana, who was in search of his wife Sita, are regarded to have arrived at this place. When Rama and Lakshmana went there in search of Sita, they find Jatayu mortally wounded in the forest. The eagle Jatayu narrated these events to Rama before breathing his last. The presiding deity, Vijayaraghava Perumal, is believed to have performed the last rites of Jatayu at this place. The water body where Jatayu fell is called Jatayu Tirtham. Jatayu belongs to the Pul (a separate family of eagle) family and was buried in a pit (Tamil: kuli), and hence this site is called Thiruputkuḻi. The same legend is also associated with Thirupullabhoothangudi Temple.

== Religious importance ==
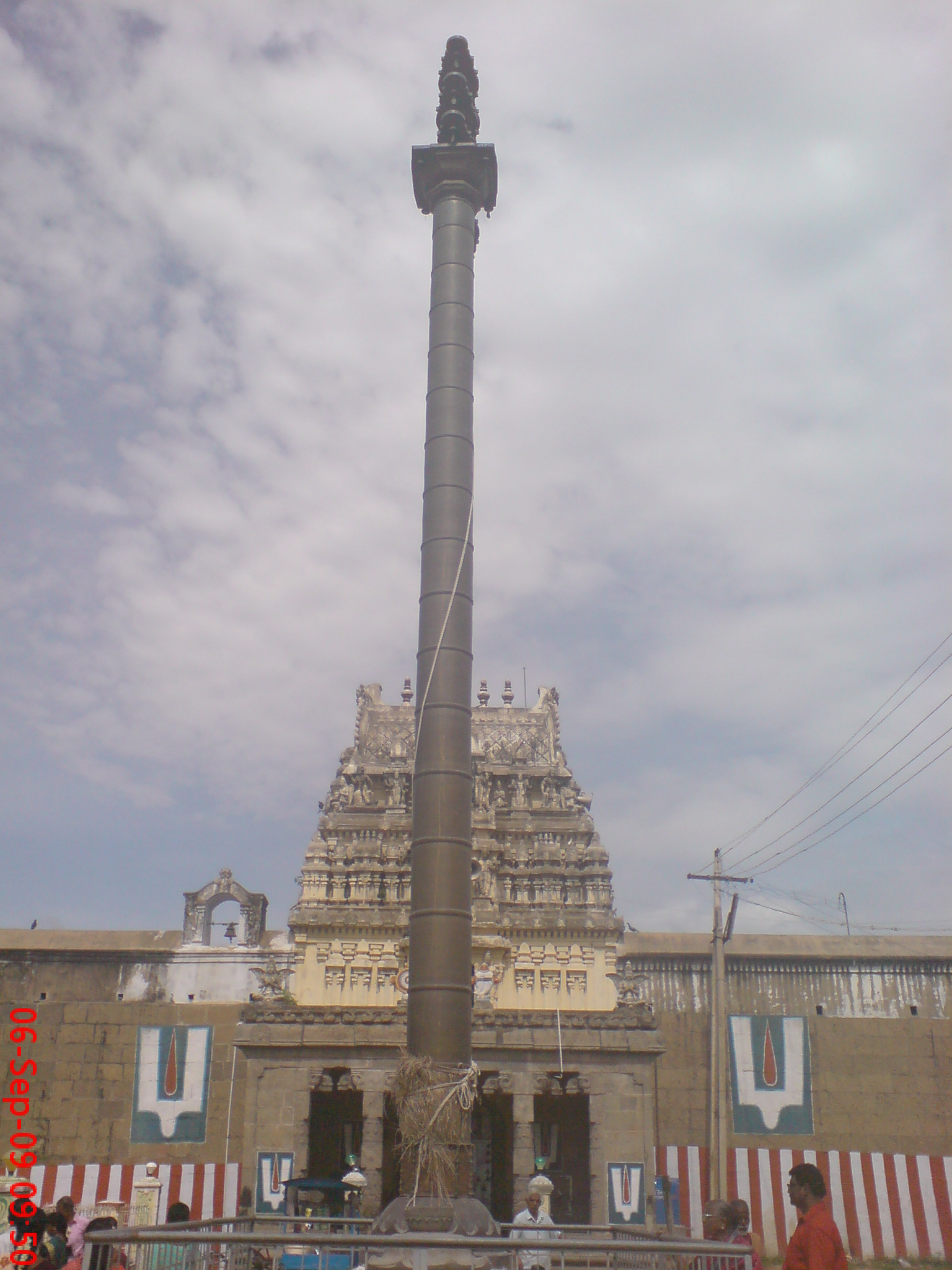
Temple Gopuram

The temple is revered in Naalayira Divya Prabandham, the 7th–9th century Vaishnava canon, by Thirumangai Alvar in one hymn. The temple is classified as a Divya Desam, one of the 108 Vishnu temples that are mentioned in the book. Thiruputkuḻi is believed to be the birthplace of Yadava Prakaasa, the teacher of Vaishanava saint Ramanuja and also that of Pinpaḻagiya Perumal Jeeyar. Vedanta Desika composed hymns praising the presiding deity. Thirumangai Alvar has also revered the temple in his verses. The temple follows Pancharaktha Agama and the worship practises are carried out by hereditary priests belonging to the Porakathi Bhattar sect.

== External ==
- "Thiruputkuzhi - Sri Vijayaraghava Perumal Temple, Tirupukuzhi". Divyadesam.com.
- "Thiruputkuzhi Sri Vijayaraghava Perumal Temple". Sri Vaishnavam Practices. Archived from the original on 23 February 2010.
