= Jatayu =

Ramayana character

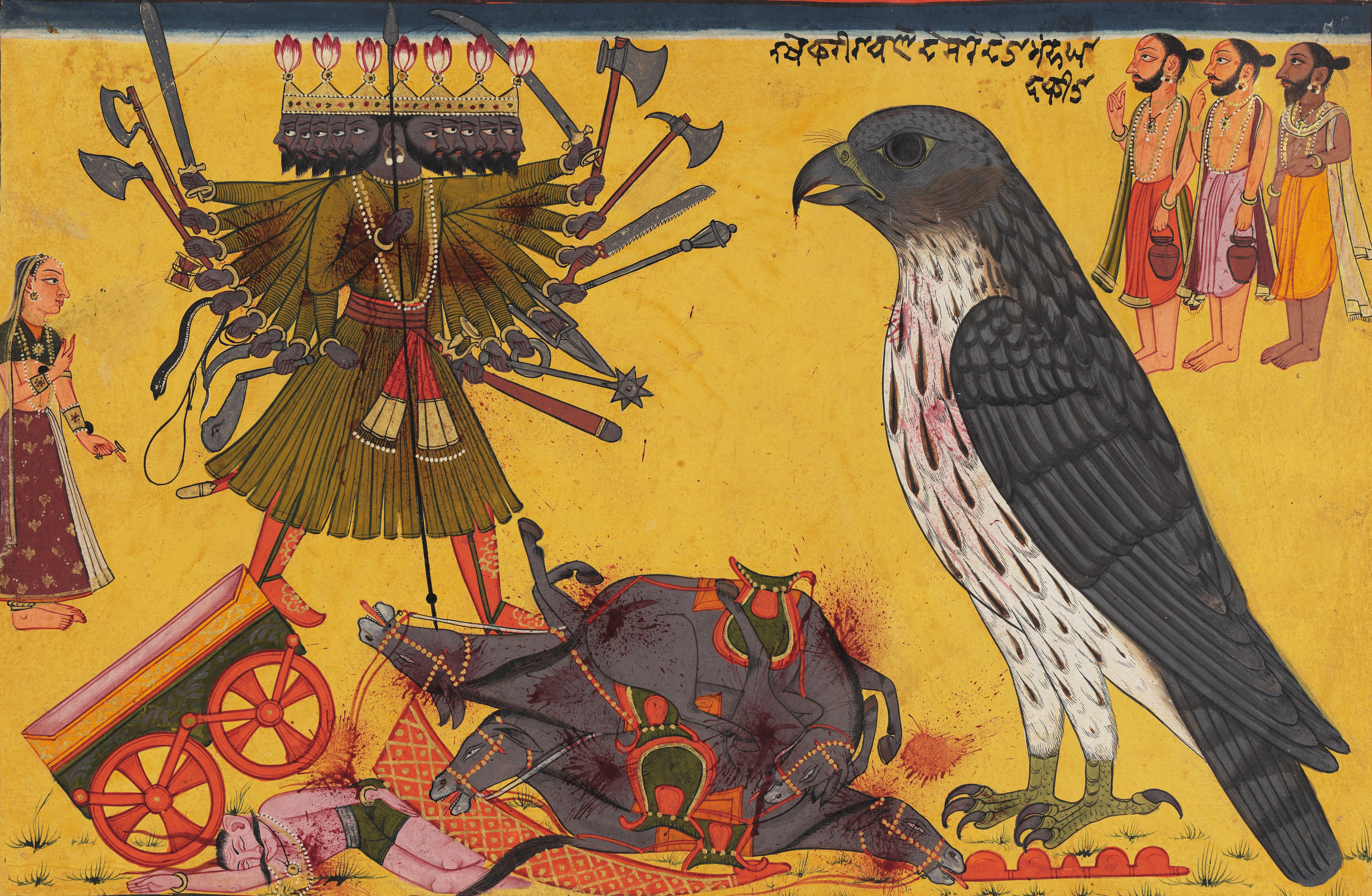
- A painting of Jatayu attacking Ravana to save Sita and shattering his Chariot, early 18th century
- Texts: Ramayana and its other versions

Genealogy
- Parents: Aruna (father); Shyeni (mother)
- Siblings: Sampati

Jatayu (Sanskrit: जटायु, IAST: Jaṭāyu) is a demigod in the Hindu epic Rāmayana, who has the form of a vulture. He was the younger son of Aruṇa and his wife Shyeni, the brother of Sampati, and the nephew of Garuda. He was also an old friend of King Dasharatha, Rāma's father.

== Legend ==
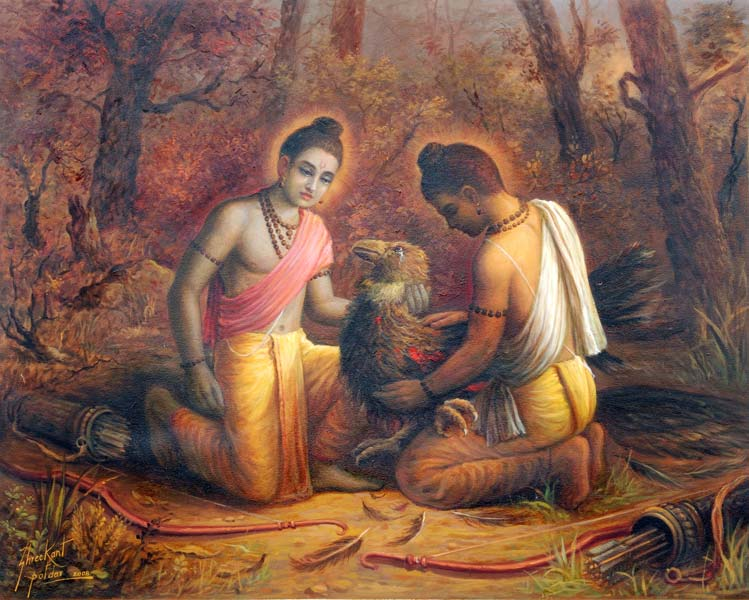
Rama and Lakshmana meet a dying Jatayu.

=== Flight towards the Sun ===
During their youth, Jatayu and his elder brother, Sampati, under a wager, flew towards Sūrya, the solar deity. Jatayu, careless due to his youthfulness, outflew his brother, and entered the Sūryamaṇḍala, the orbit of the Sun, during noon. Due to the blazing heat of Surya, his wings started to get scorched. In a desperate bid to rescue his brother, Sampati flew ahead of him, spreading his wings wide open to shield him. As a consequence, it was Sampati who had his wings burnt, descending towards the Vindhya mountains. Incapacitated, he spent the rest of his life under the protection of a sage named Nishakara, who performed a penance in the mountains. Jatayu never met his brother again.

=== Battle against Ravana ===
The Araṇya-Kāṇḍa of the Ramayana mentions that Jatayu is the "King of Vultures"(gṛdhrarāja). According to the epic, the rakshasa Ravana was abducting the avatar of Lakshmi, Sita, when Jatayu tried to rescue her. Jatayu fought valiantly with Ravana, but as Jatayu was very old, Ravana soon defeated him, clipping his wings, and Jatayu descended upon the earth. Rama and Lakshmana, while searching for Sita, chanced upon the stricken and dying Jatayu, who informed them of the battle with Ravana, and told them that Ravana had headed south. Jatayu then died of his wounds and Rama performed his final funeral rites.

== Veneration ==
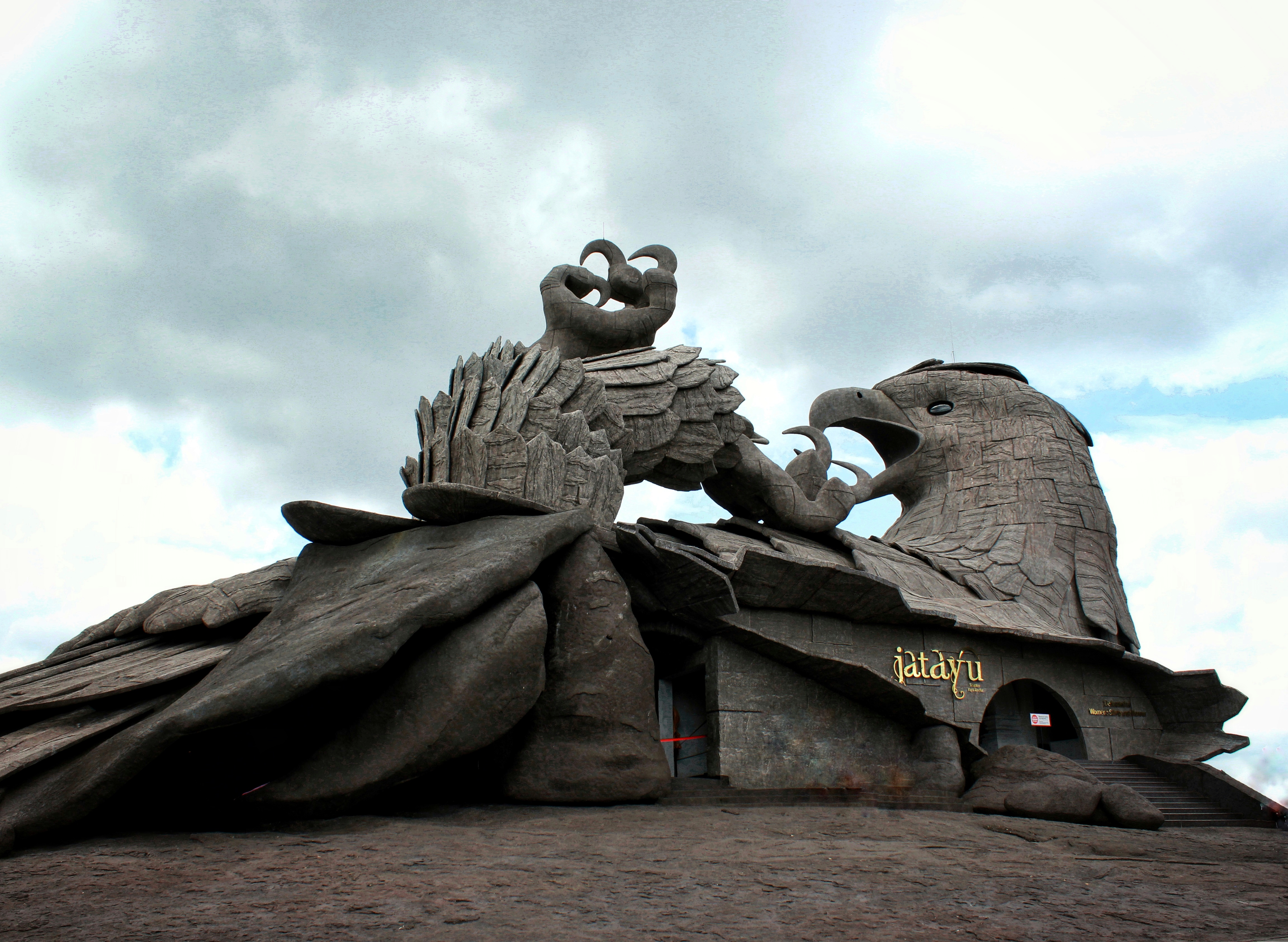
Jaṭayu sculpture at Jaṭāyū Nature Park

- According to local lore of Kerala, it is believed that Jatayu fell on the rocks in Chadayamangalam in the Kollam district of Kerala after his wings were clipped off by Ravana. The name "Chadayamangalam" is said to be derived from "Jatayu-mangalam". Jatayu Earth's Center Nature Park in Chadayamangalam features a 61 metres (200 ft) wide statue of Jatayu, which is credited as the world's largest bird sculpture.
- Lepakshi in Andhra Pradesh is also attributed as the place where Jatayu fell after being wounded by Ravana. Rama is said to have commanded the bird to rise, saying Le Pakshi (literally: "Get up, Bird" in Telugu), hence the name for the village.
- Vijayaraghava Perumal temple in Thiruputkuli, Tamil Nadu is associated with Jatayu because the presiding deity, Vijayaraghava Perumal (a form of Rama), is believed to have performed the last rites of Jataya at this place. The water body where Jatayu fell is called Jatayu Tirtham.
- Thirupullabhoothangudi Temple in Pullabhoothangudi, Tamil Nadu is also claimed as the location of Jatayu's last rites.

== Depictions ==
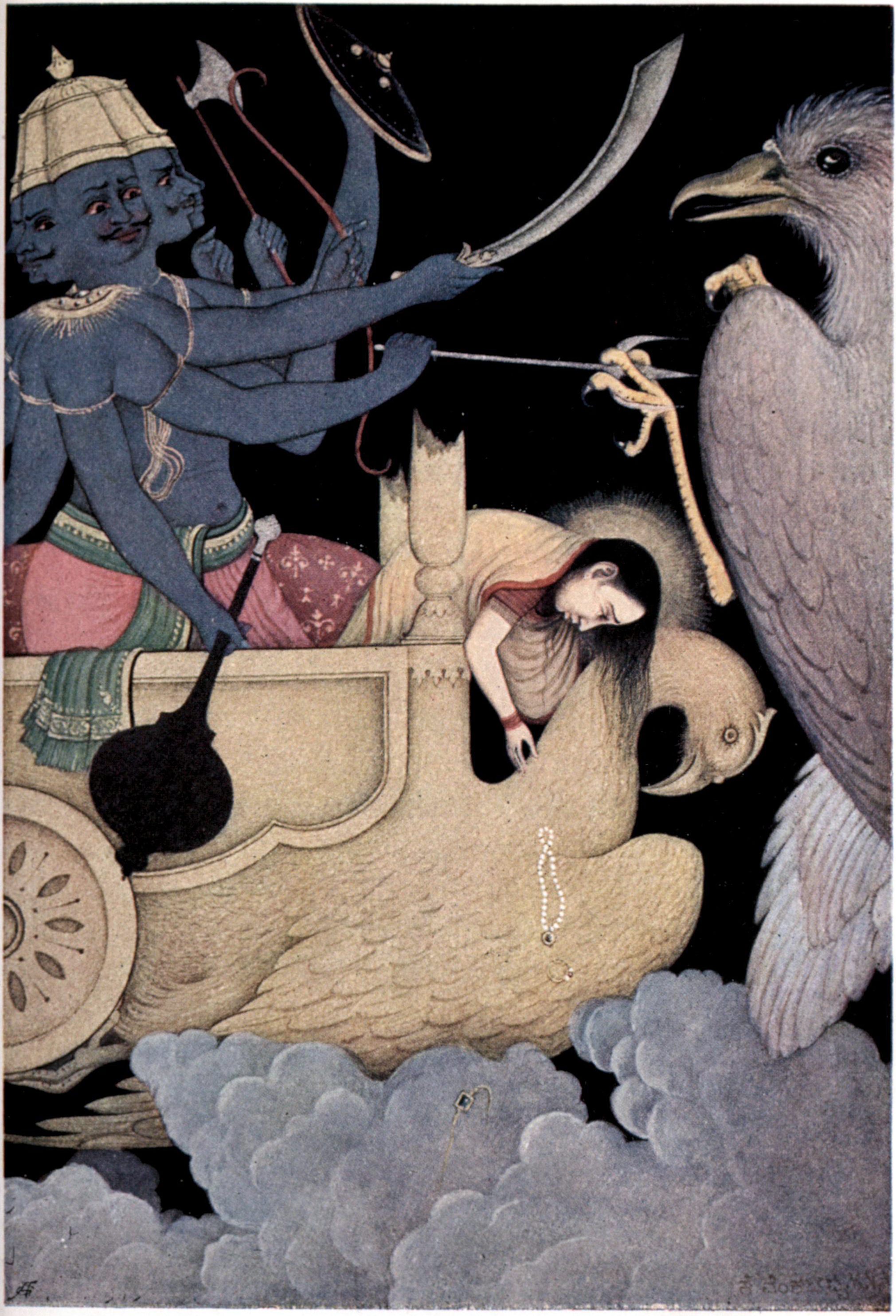
A painting of Ravana fighting Jatayu

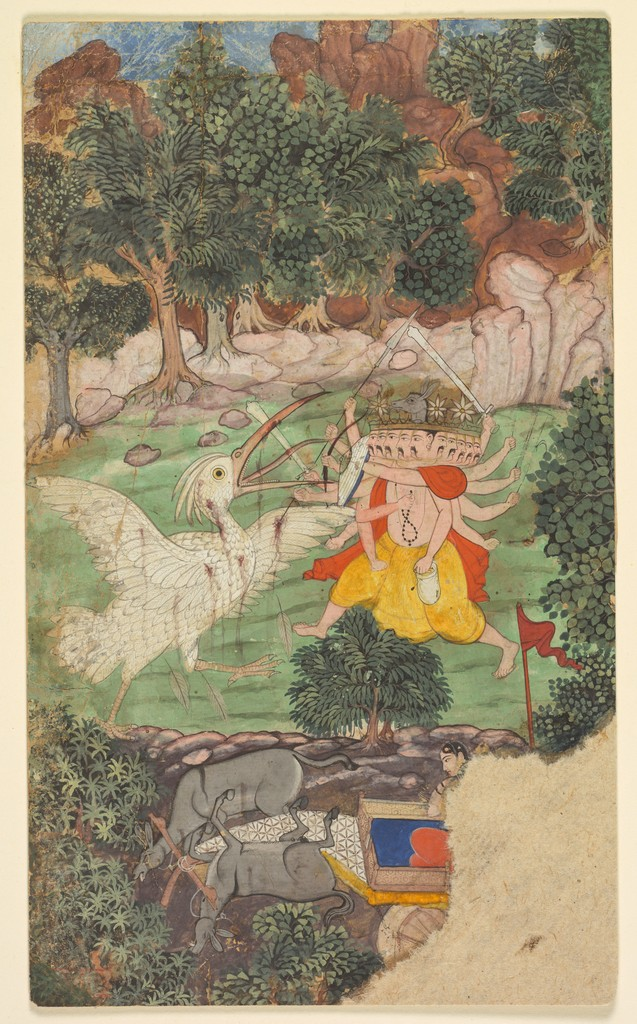
A painting of Jatayu fighting Ravana (c.1605)

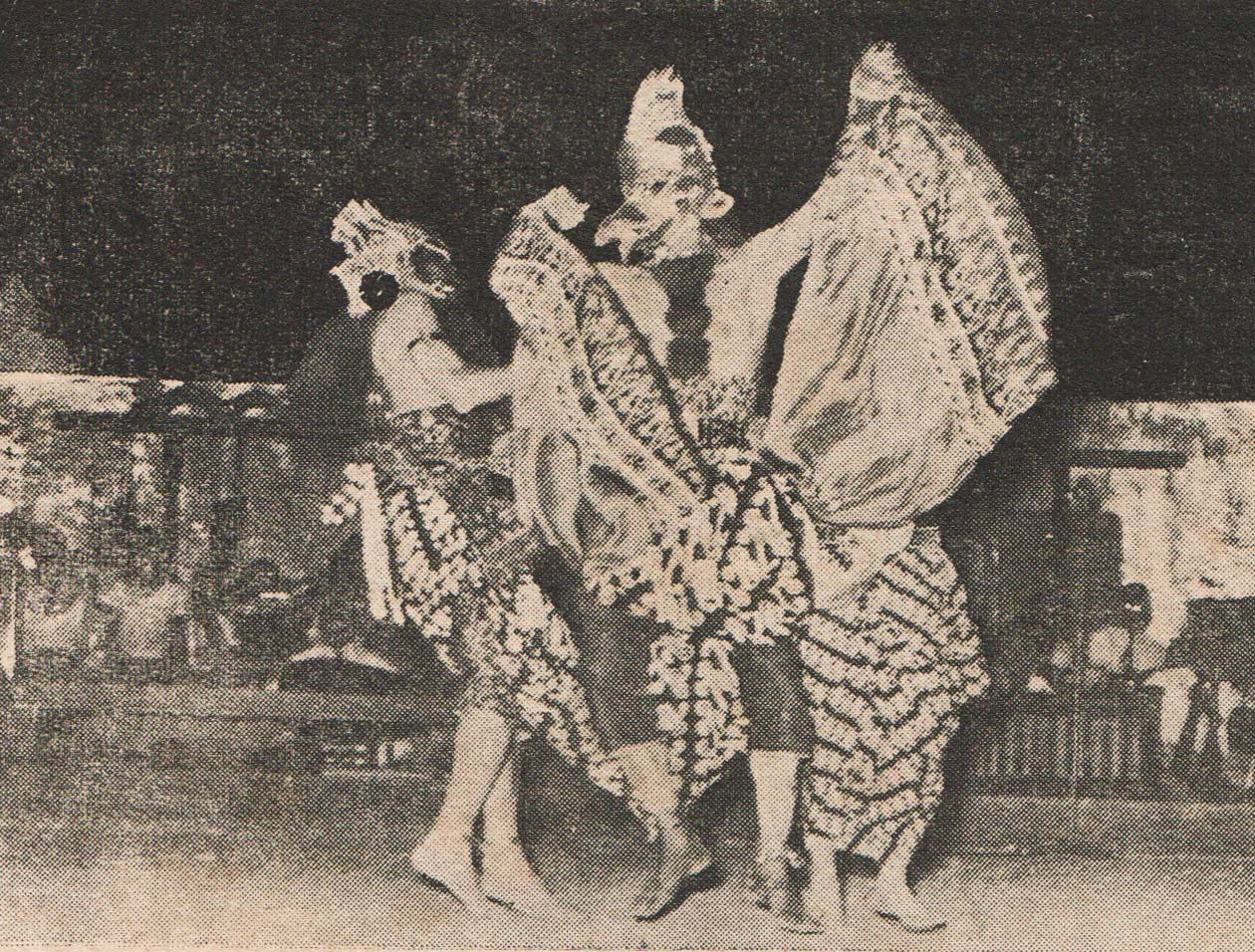
Ramayana Ballet - Jatayu fighting Ravana (Yogyakarta, Indonesia)

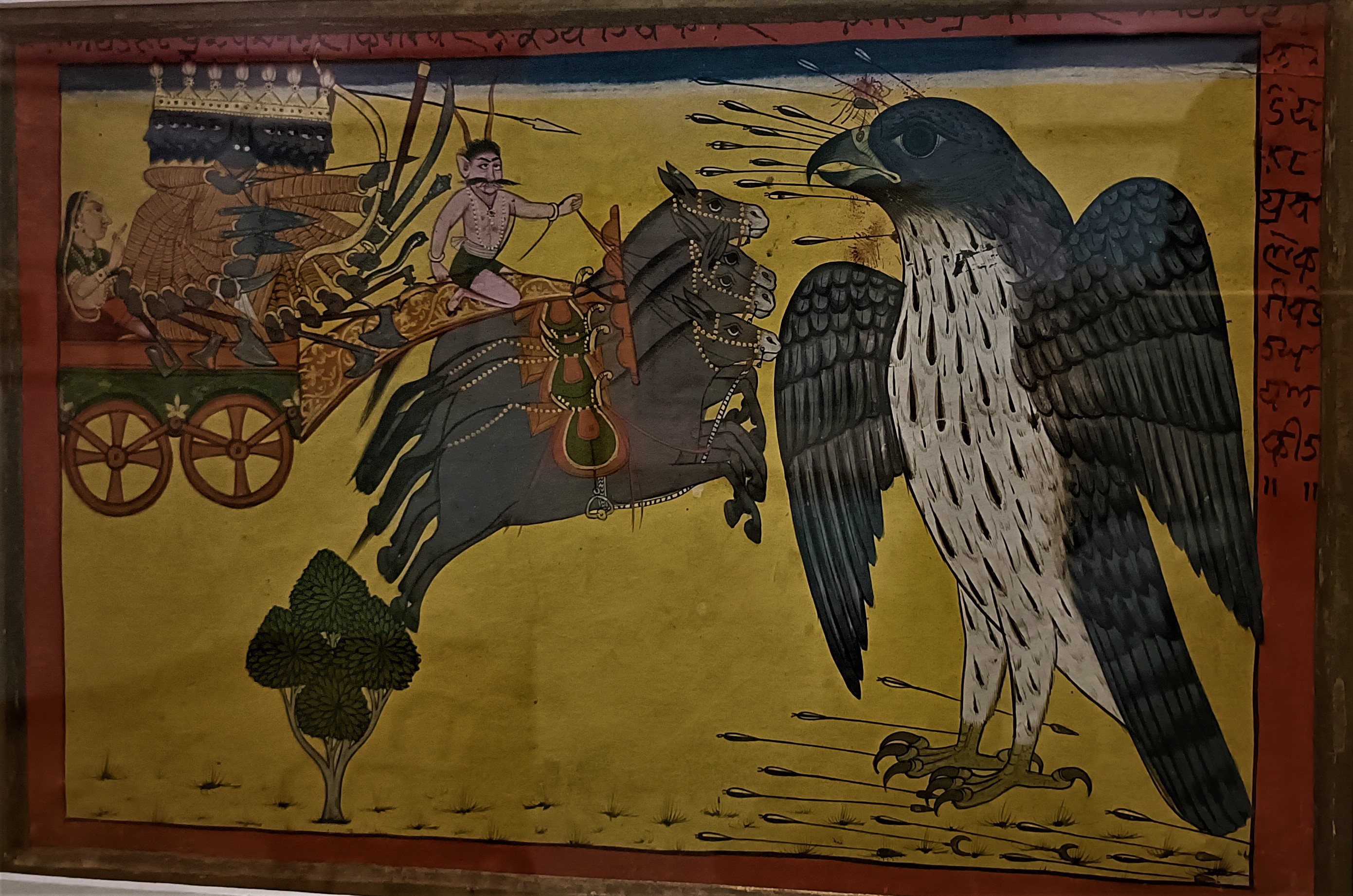
A painting of Jatayu confronting Ravana to save Sita (c.1740-50)

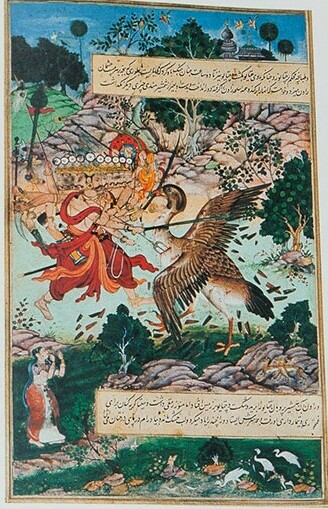
Ravana kills Jatayu

== In popular culture ==
In 2026, Jatayu was voiced by Anupam Kher in the Indian film, Ramayana: Part 1.

== See also ==
- Garuda
- Sampati
- Jatayu Nature Park

== Bibliography ==
- Dictionary of Hindu Lore and Legend (ISBN 0-500-51088-1) by Anna Dhallapiccola
- Ramayana (ISBN 0-89744-930-4) by C. Rajagopalachari
