= Thiru Aadanoor Temple =

Hindu temple in Thanjavur

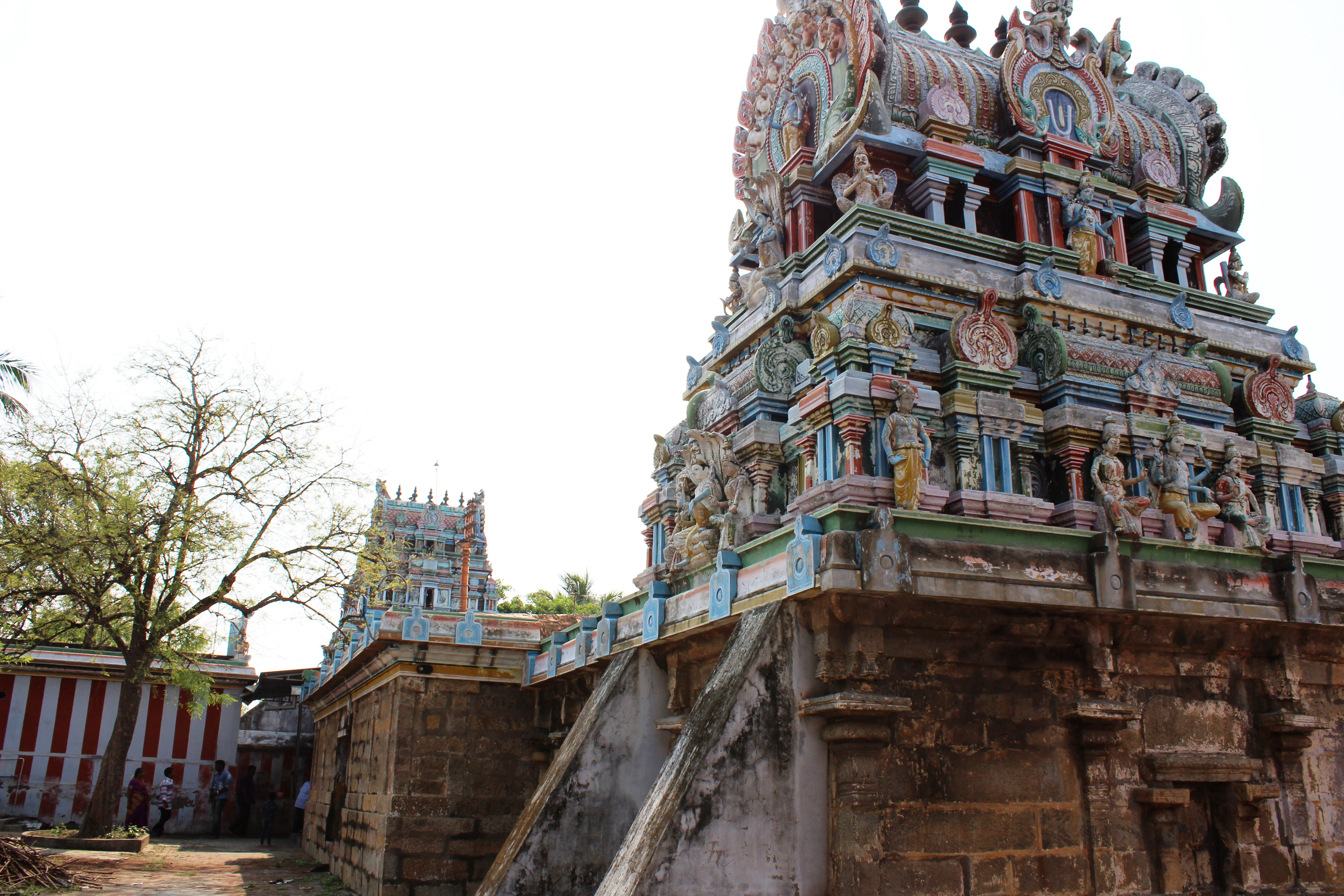

- Location in Tamil Nadu

Religion
- Affiliation: Hinduism
- District: Thanjavur
- Deity: Andalakkum Aiyan Perumal (Vishnu); Ranganayaki (Lakshmi)
- Features: Tower: Pranava; Temple tank: Surya

Location
- Location: Aadanoor, Kumbakonam
- State: Tamil Nadu
- Country: India
- Coordinates: 10°58′35″N 79°18′48″E

Architecture
- Type: Dravidian architecture

The Thiru Aadanoor or the Andalakkum Aiyan Perumal Temple is a Hindu temple dedicated to Vishnu located in Aadanoor, Thanjavur district in Tamil Nadu, India. Constructed in Dravidian style of architecture, the temple is glorified in the Nalayira Divya Prabandham, the early medieval Tamil canon of the Alvar saints from the 6th–9th centuries CE. It is counted as one among the 108 Divya Desams dedicated to Vishnu. Vishnu is worshipped as Andalakkum Aiyan and his consort is worshipped as Ranganayaki, a form of Lakshmi.

The temple has a small shrine with Vimanam and 3-tier rajagopuram. The temple was built by Aditya Chola. The temple is located in Olaipadi, a small village, 7 km away from Kumbakonam and 2 km from Swamimalai. The temple tank is located north of the temple. The deities are similar to the Sri Ranganathaswamy temple of Srirangam with the chief deity Vishnu in a reclining, half-sleeping posture.

== Legend ==
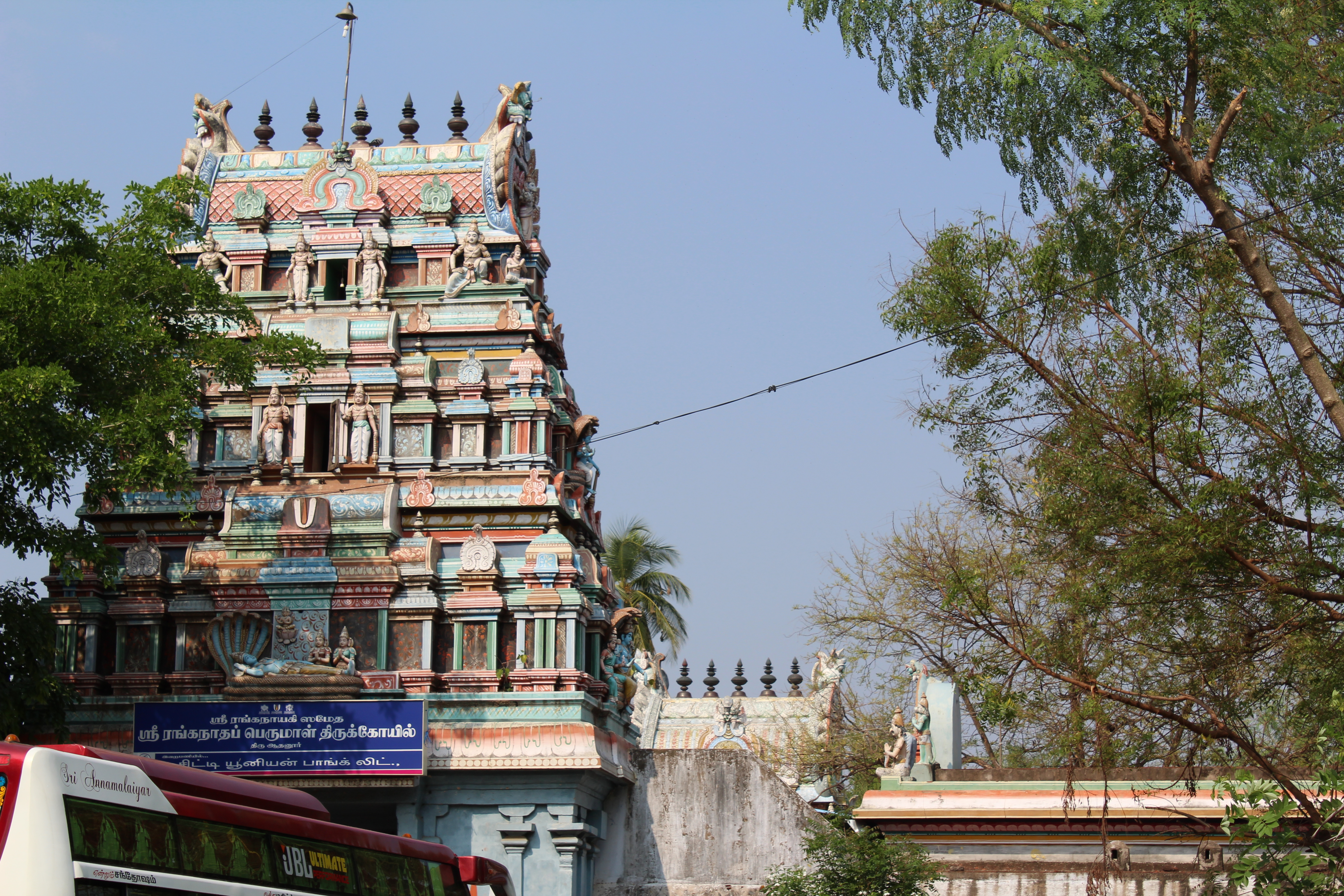
Gopuram of the temple

According to the temple's regional legend, there was an affluent devotee who also wished to partake in religious endeavour of serving Ranganatha. Some of those who worked under him exploited his bhakti to their advantage and swindled all his money, making him penniless. Pleased with his devotion, Vishnu appeared in his dream and promised to help him out of the situation. He instructed the devotee to bring along a marakkal and his workers, who cheated him, to the bank of the Kollidam, where he promised to pay the workers their dues. The deity, in the guise of an old man, gave each of them a measure of sand from the bank of Kollidam according to the work done by them. Much to their surprise, it turned into precious stones for those who toiled and it stayed the same for those who shirked work. The workers who did not get anything were enraged and started chasing the old man. At this juncture, the deity appeared in his original form and made the workers realize their mistakes. It is also believed that the presiding deity appeared for Kamadhenu, the holy cow and also for Thirumangai Alvar, the saint poet of 8th century.

As per another legend, the celestial deities Indra and Agni worshiped Vishnu at this place. Indra once insulted the sage Bhrigu when he placed the divine garland offered to him on his elephant Airavata. Bhrigu cursed him to lose all the powers. Indra did severe penance in the place to regain the powers. Agni, the fire god, was affected with Brahmahatha Dosha, a curse inflicted on account of burning the head of Brahma handed over by Shiva. He was propitiated off his curse by offering worship at this temple.

== Architecture ==
Aadanoor temple is located in Adanoor located 8 km (5.0 mi) away from Kumbakonam in Thanjavur district in the South Indian state of Tamil Nadu. It is located close to Swamimalai. The temple has a three-tiered rajagopuram, the temple tower and all the shrines are enclosed by rectangular enclosure. The sanctum is located axial to the gopuram and is approached through sacrificial altar and temple mast. There are sculptures of Kamadhenu, the divine cow and her daughter Nandini. The temple is believed to be similar to the Srirangam Ranganathaswamy temple in all its form having seven enclosures, but were destroyed with time. The vimana, the shrine over the sanctum is called Pranava Vimana, where image of Vishnu is visible up to knee. As per the legend in Srirangam temple, it is believed that the world will get destroyed when the feet of the image emerges. Hanuman, the vanara deity, is said to have visited the temple on his way to Lanka. Rama is believed to have visited the place hearing about Hanuman's visit and the foot marks are sculpted to indicate the legend. The image of Hanuman in the place is known as Virasudarshana Anjaneya.

== Religious importance ==
The temple is revered in Nalayira Divya Prabandham, the 7th–9th century Sri Vaishnava canon, by Kulasekhara Alvar in one hymn. The temple is classified as a Divya Desam, one of the 108 Vishnu temples that are mentioned in the book. Thirumangai Alvar has sung in praise of the deity in this temple with one pasuram, numbered at 3815. It is believed that once the temple was buried under earth. At the same time, a Kashmiri Princess was afflicted on account of a spell from a magician. Vishnu appeared in the dreams of the king and asked him to renovate the submerged temple. The king is believed to have followed the orders, resulting in the princess getting propitiated. The worship in the temple is thus believed to offer solace to people afflicted by witchcraft.
