= Swamimalai Bronze Icons =

- Geographical indication
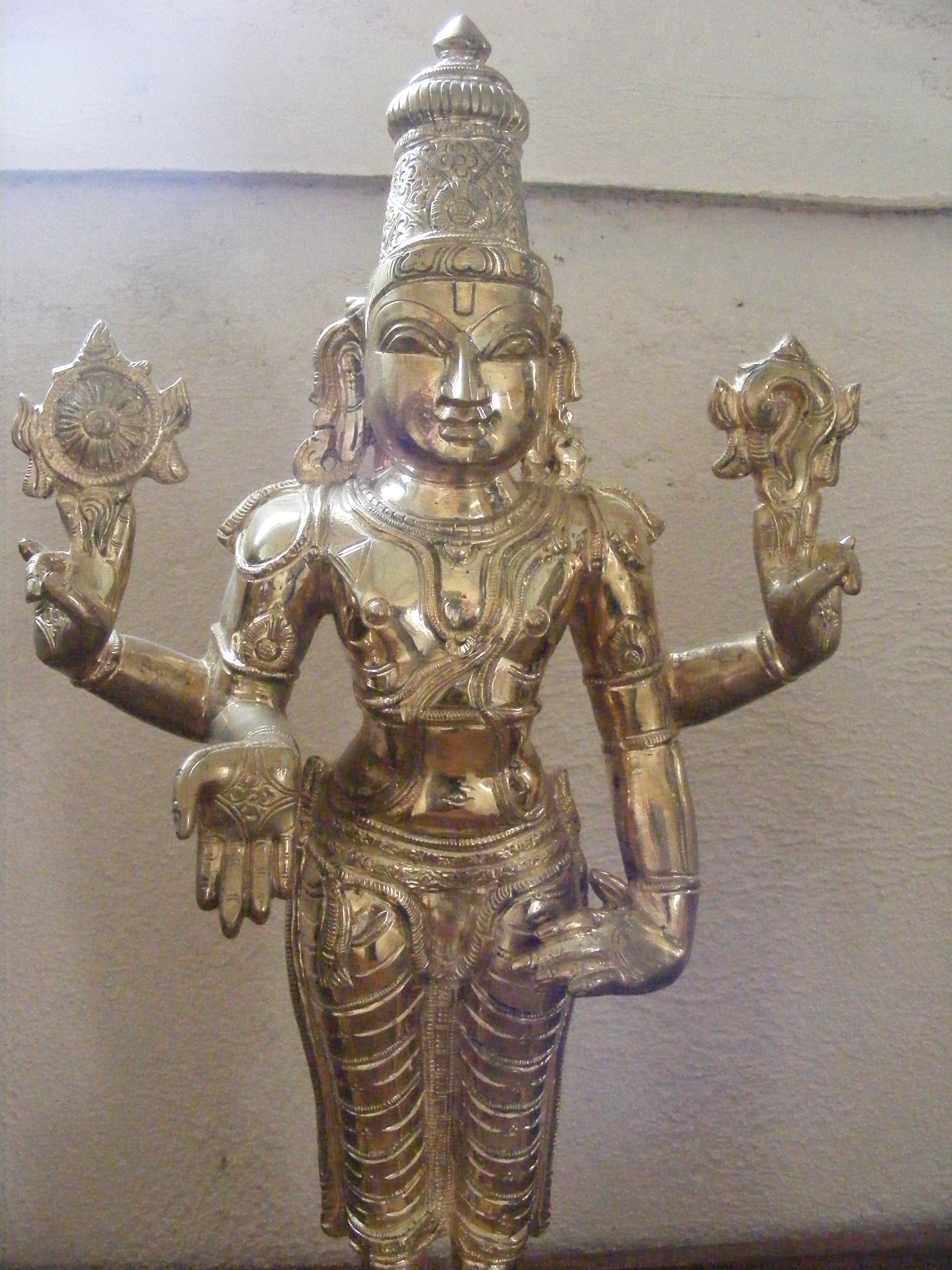
- A Panchaloha icon
- Description: bronze idols and statues manufactured in Swamimalai
- Type: handicraft
- Area: Swamimalai, Tamil Nadu
- Country: India
- Registered: 2008–09
- Material: metal, wax, clay, bronze

Swamimalai Bronze Icons are traditional bronze sculptures and idols produced in the town of Swamimalai in Thanjavur district, Tamil Nadu. It was registered as a geographical indication by the Government of India in 2008–2009.

== History ==
During the Chola period, King Raja Raja I (r. 985-1014 CE) commissioned sculptors for the construction of iconography of the Brihadisvara Temple in Thanjavur. Subsequent generations of these metal artisans cast statues for the 12th-century Airavatesvara Temple at Darasuram and later settled at the nearby Swamimalai.

== Production ==
The icons vary from small decorative pieces to large temple sculptures measuring 1.8 to 3.7 m (6 to 12 ft) in height. The production is closely controlled and limited in number to maintain quality. While the primary production is of Hindu deities, artisans also cast animal figures, portraits and other motifs based on requirements. Casting is done using the ancient lost-wax process (cire perdue), producting either solid or hollow casts.

For solid castings, artisans prepare an original model form a wax compund made of pure beeswax, tree resin (kungiliyam), and groundnut oil in a 4:4:1 ratio. The wax model is overlayed with three successive layers of clay moulding (the investment): a fine 3 mm (0.12 in) inner layer of alluvial soil from the Kaveri River bed mixed with charred rice husk, and cowdung; a secondary layer of paddy field clay, and sand; and a coarse outer coat of sand and clay. For larger statues, the clay coating is reinforced using metal rods.

The mould is heated to melt and drain the wax core. This is followed by the pouring of the molten metal into the hollow cavity. Historically, icons were cast using Panchaloha, a five-metal alloy comprising gold, silver, copper, zinc and lead. In contemporary practice, brass and bronze alloys (primarily copper, zinc, tin or lead) are more commonly used. Icons made of precious metals (gold and silver) are produced only for specific temple sanctum commissions. Once the metal solidifies, the clay shell is broken away and raw casting is hand-chiseled, filed and polished.

== Measurements ==
Artisans determine the icon's proportions using traditional measurement systems set out in Shilpa Shastras. The basic unit of measurement is tala, defined as the distance from the hairline to the chin. The tāla is divided into 12 aṅgulas (finger-breadths), which are further subdivided into eight yavas (barley-corn units), and so on down to the smallest unit, a paramu (smaller than the end of a single hair). Artisans use a flexible strip of coconut palm leaf, marked and folded proportionally, to verify dimensions throughout the modelling phase.

== Artisans ==
Approximately 1,200 artisans in Swamimalai work in metal sculpting. The artisans are known as sthapathis, who are traditionally from the Vishwakarma community that have practiced lost-wax metal casting for several generations.

== Export ==
Swamimalai bronze icons are exported internationally to countries including the United States, United Kingdom, Canada, Australia, South Africa, Switzerland, Malaysia and Thailand. An estimated 60 percent of the total production is destined for export, primarily for installation in Hindu temples established by global Indian diaspora.

== Geographical Indication ==
In 2008, the Tamil Nadu Handicraft Development Corporation Applied for intellectual property protection for the craft. The Government of India granted Geographical Indication status to Swamimalai Bronze Icons under the Geographical Indication of Goods Act, 1999, in the 2008–09 cycle (GI Application No. 126).

== Training and modern preservation ==
To preserve the hereditary craft, the government of Tamil Nadu established the government College of Fine Arts (formerly the Government Sculpture Training Centre) in nearby Kumbakonam. This offers structured degree programmes in traditional metal casting and temple architecture. Landmark monumental statues, including major Nataraja icons for domestic and international institutions have been executed by several master sthapathis from Swamimalai. They include the recipients of the National Award for Master Craftpersons and the Padmashri.
