= Jatayu Earth's Center Nature Park =

National Park in Kerala, India

Jatayu Earth's Center
- Jatayu Nature Park
- Jatayupara
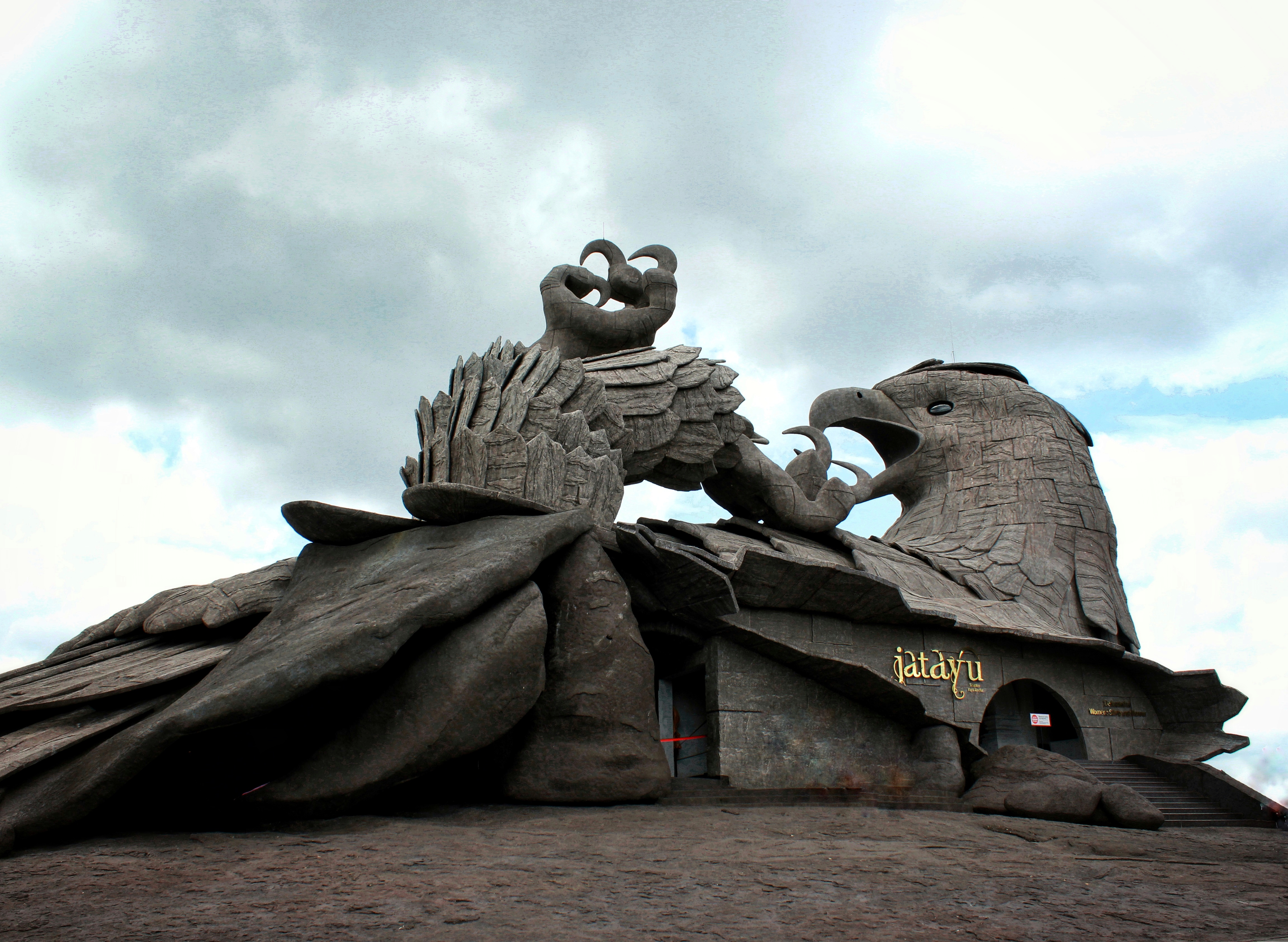

- Location within Kerala
- Type: Adventure Park
- Location: Chadayamangalam, Kollam, India
- Nearest city: Kollam(Quilon); 38 km (24 mi)
- Coordinates: 8°51′57″N 76°52′02″E
- Area: 65 acres (26.30 ha)
- Opening: Phase-I; 5 December 2017; Phase-II; 17 August 2018
- Designer: Rajiv Anchal
- Operator: Jatayupara Tourism Private Limited
- Status: Open all year
- Budget: ₹100 crore (US$11 million)
- Public transit: C'mangalam - 1.5 km, Kottarakkara - 21.8 km, Kottarakara - 20.5 km, Varkala - 26 km, Paravur - 27 km, Kollam - 36 km, Trivandrum - 52.3 km
- Website: jatayuearthscenter.in

Jatayu Earth's Center, (IPA: [dʒɐʈaːju]) also known as Jatayu Nature Park is a tourism centre at Chadayamangalam in Kollam district of Kerala, India. It is situated on top of a hill named Jatayupara and at an altitude of 350 m (1,150 ft) above mean sea level. To get to the top, there is a cable car, and it is the only cable car in Kerala. The honor of being the largest bird sculpture in the world belongs to Jatayu.

Made of concrete and steel, the sculpture measures 200 feet (61 m) long, 150 feet (46 m) wide, 70 feet (21 m) in height and occupies 15,000 square feet (1,400 m^{2}) of floor area). It was sculpted by Rajiv Anchal.

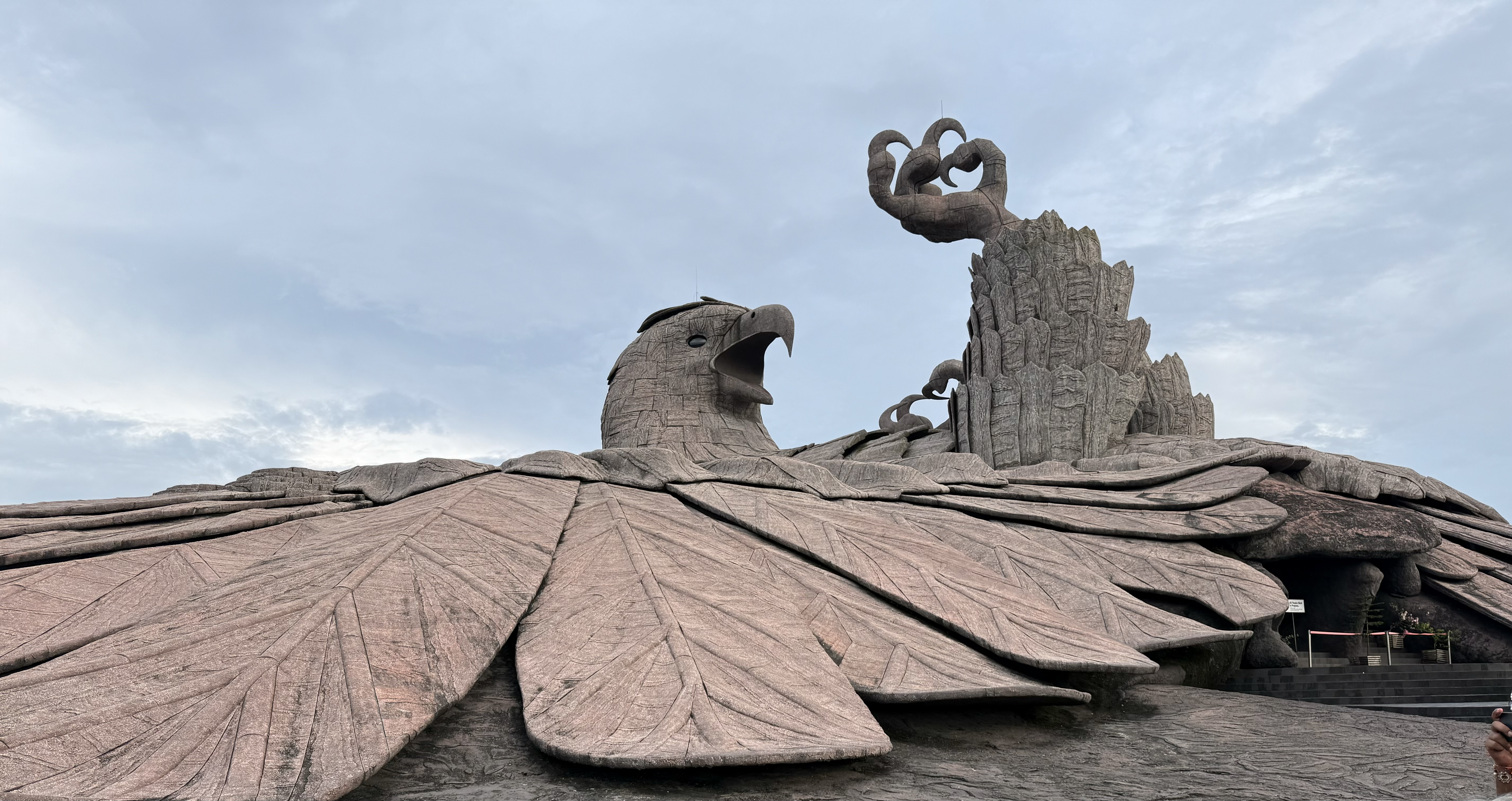
Sculpture of Jatayu

This rock-theme nature park was the first Public–private partnership tourism initiative in the state of Kerala under the BOT model. The park is about 38 km (24 mi) away from the city of Kollam and 46 km (29 mi) away from the state capital, Thiruvananthapuram.

After completion, it became accessible to visitors on 17 August 2018.

== Origins ==
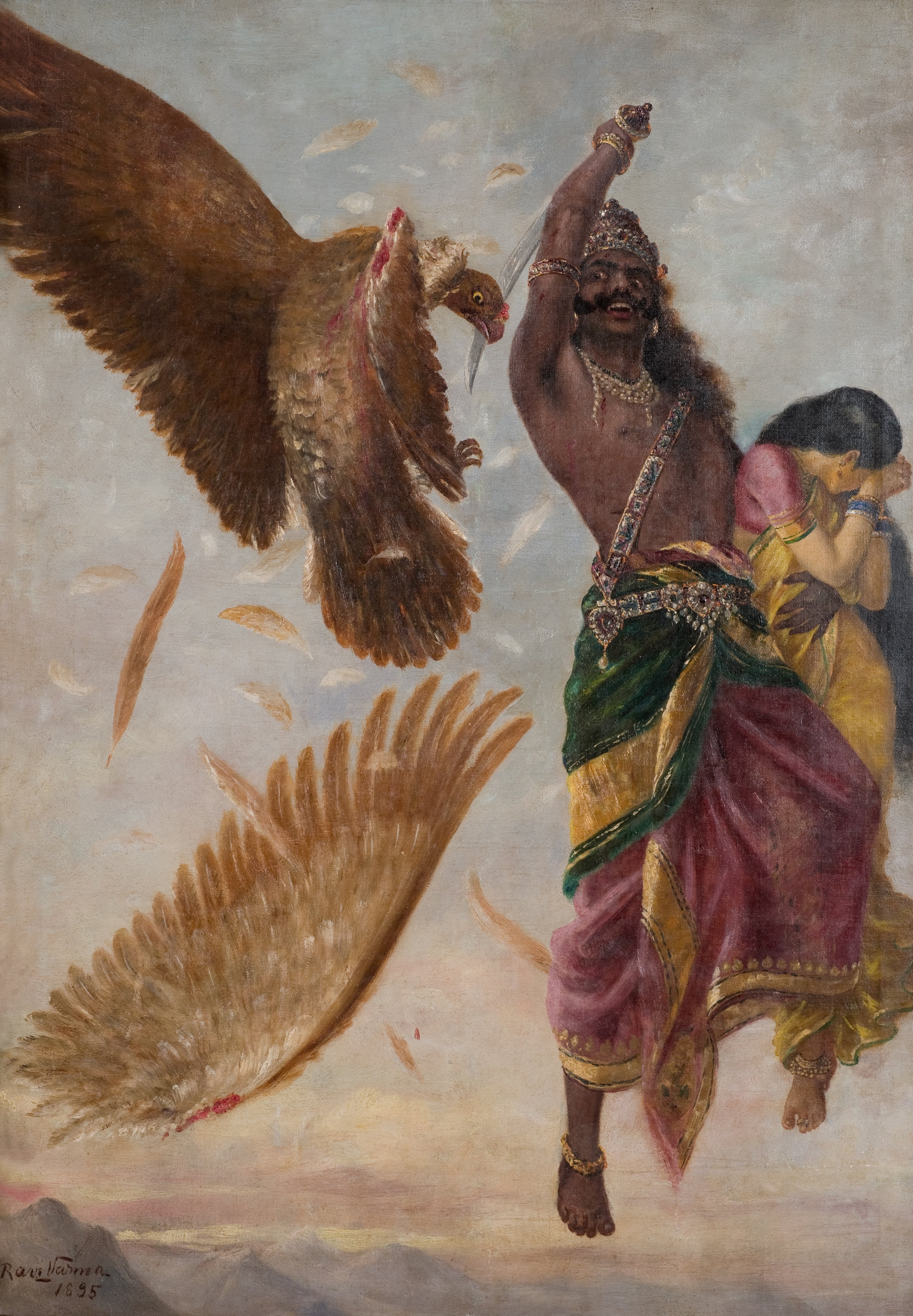
Ravana cuts Jatayu's wings, by Raja Ravi Varma

The park is located near the town of Chadayamangalam in Kerala (Jatayumangalam), which was named for Jatayu. Jatayu was a demi-god in Ramayana (a Hindu epic) who had the form of a vulture.

According to the epic, Ravana was attempting to abduct Sita to Lanka when Jatayu tried to rescue her. Jatayu fought valiantly with Ravana, but as Jatayu was very old Ravana soon defeated him, clipping his wings, and Jatayu fell onto the rocks in Chadayamangalam. Rama and Lakshmana while on the search for Sita, chanced upon the stricken and dying Jatayu, who informed them of the battle with Ravana and told them that Ravana had headed South to Lanka (Ravana's stronghold).

== The park ==
=== The Statue ===
The statue is a representation of a legend - Ramayana, and symbolizes the protection of women, and their honour and safety. It was designed and sculpted by Rajiv Anchal.

=== Dimensions ===
Feature
| Height | 21 m |
| Floor area | 1,400 m^{2} |
| Length | 61 m |
| Breadth | 46 m |
| Number of wing and tail feathers | 52 m |
| Head thickness from ear to ear | Unknown |
| Height of head | Unknown |
| Distance from eye to eye | Unknown |
| Total weight of statue | Unknown |
| Length of each talon | Unknown |
| Length of beak | Unknown |
| Height of beak | Unknown |
| Width of beak | Unknown |
| Height of eye | Unknown |

=== Jatayu Museum ===
It houses a five-story grand sculpture, a museum, and a multi-dimensional theater that shows an animated film depicting the epic battle between Jatayu and Ravana. In addition to all this, the Jatayu Earth's Center also has a cultural center that showcases traditional art forms, exhibitions, and folk performances.

=== Adventure Park ===
The Park, on Adventure rock hill, opened on 5 December 2017.

=== Cave Resort ===
Jatayu is said to have taken refuge in a cave after his battle with Ravana. An Ayurvedic and Siddha cave resort is under construction and will offer ayurvedic healing paired with tales of Jatayu.

=== Dedication ===
The park opened to visitors on 4 July 2018 and was soft-inaugurated by Pinarayi Vijayan, Chief Minister of Kerala. The park's first phase was worth ₹100 crore (US$11 million) and included the adventure zone having 3 km (1.9 mi) radius. On 29 November 2015, Dubai Corporation for Tourism and Commerce's Director of stakeholder relations, Majid Al Marri visited the under construction Jatayu Nature Park along with the then Chief Minister of Kerala, Mr. Oommen Chandy.

== Access and attributes ==
=== Location and access ===
The park is located on a hilltop in Kollam district in Kerala. No special transportation is required to get into the park. To reach the top, where Jatayu's sculpture is present, visitors can either take the 826 steps walkway up the hill, or take the cable car. An additional paid ticket is required for cable car route. There is a security screening process on the way to the top. Cameras and bags are allowed. Food is not allowed. Water is allowed, but not in a plastic bottle. Free filtered water is available at the top. There are multiple cafes present throughout the route.

=== Inscriptions and plaques ===
A plaque outside the museum pays tribute to the fallen Jatayu, in a poem translated by K. Jayakumar, was dedicated by Pinarayi Vijayan, the former Chief minister of Kerala.

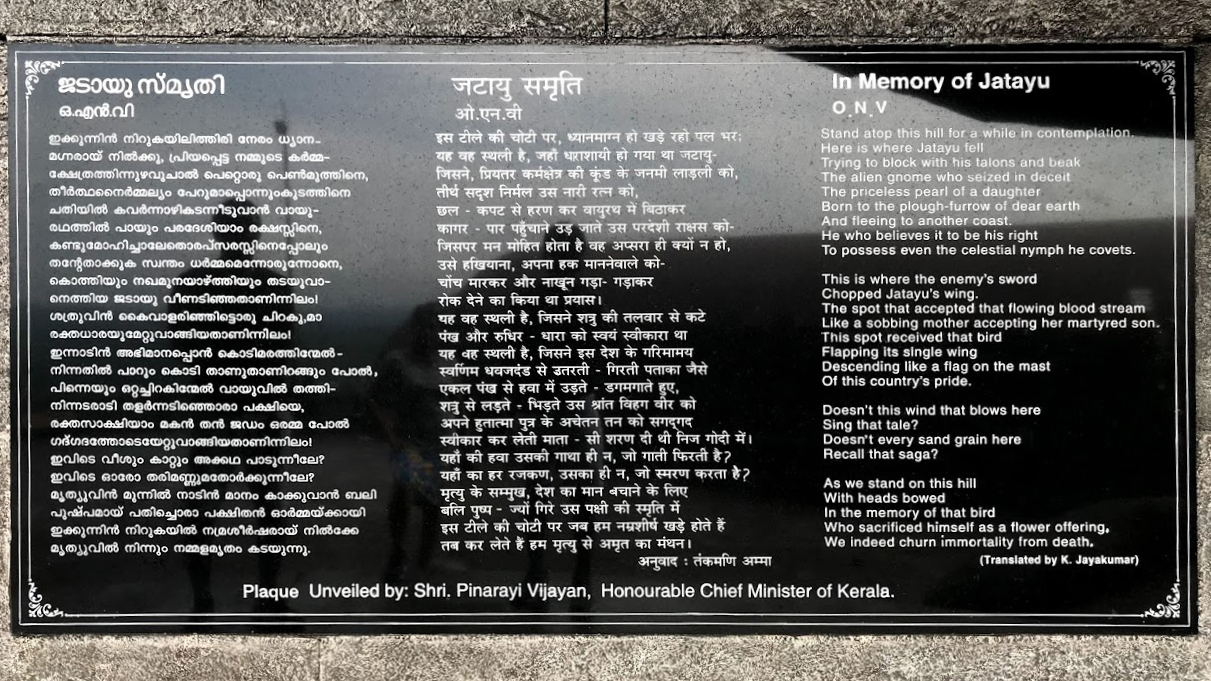
The plaque at Jatayu Nature Park, dedicated by Pinarayi Vijayan

"Stand atop this hill for a while in contemplation
Here is where Jatayu fell
Trying to block with his talons and beak
The alien gnome who seized in deceit
The priceless pearl of a daughter..."

== Gallery ==
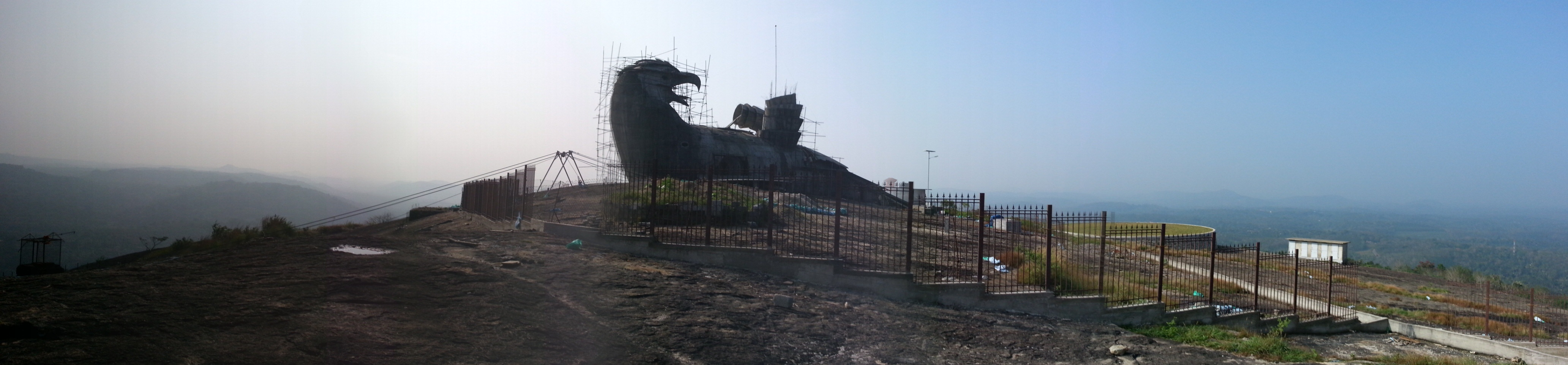
Jatayu Nature Park under construction at Chadayamangalam in Kollam district

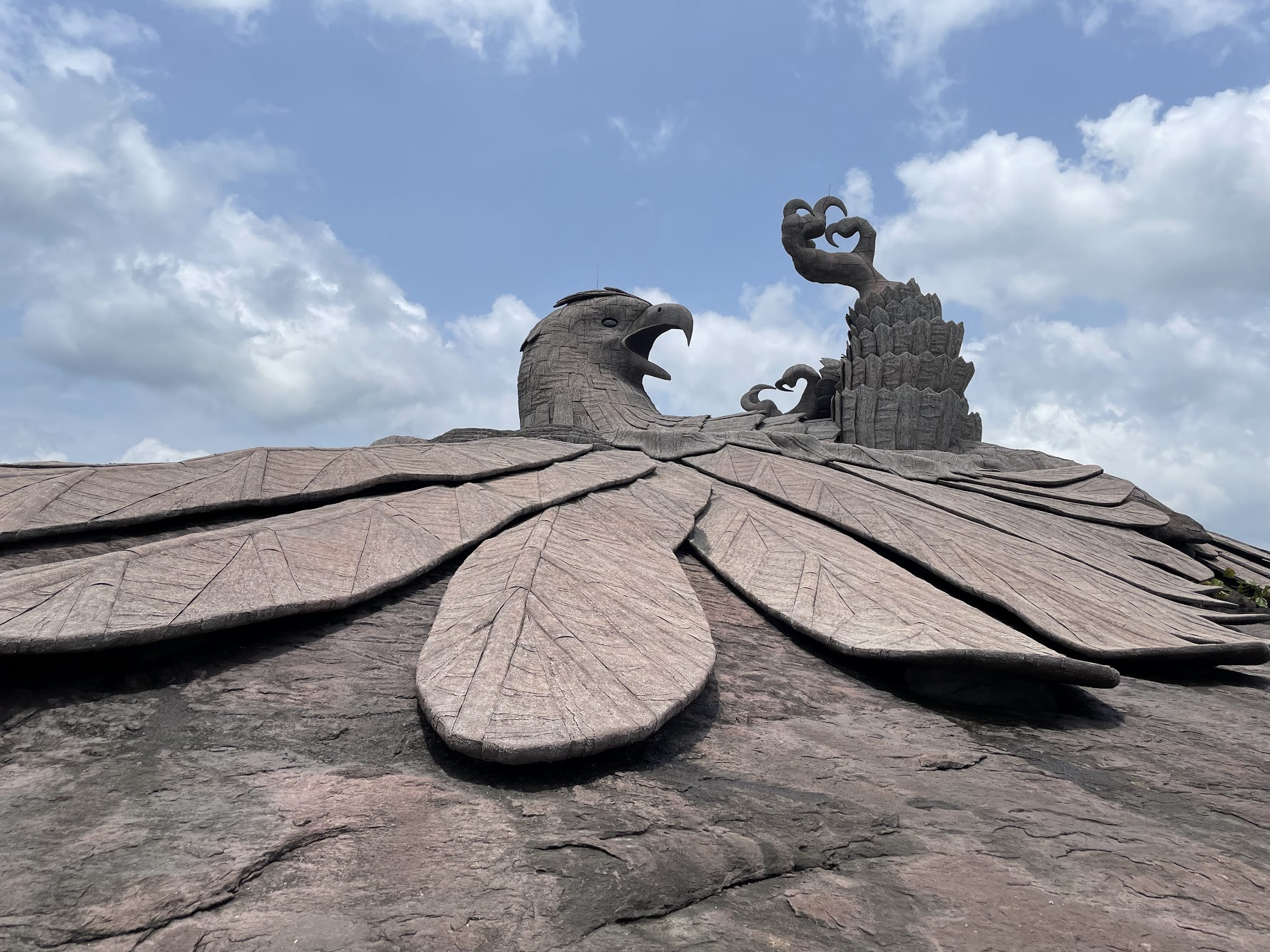

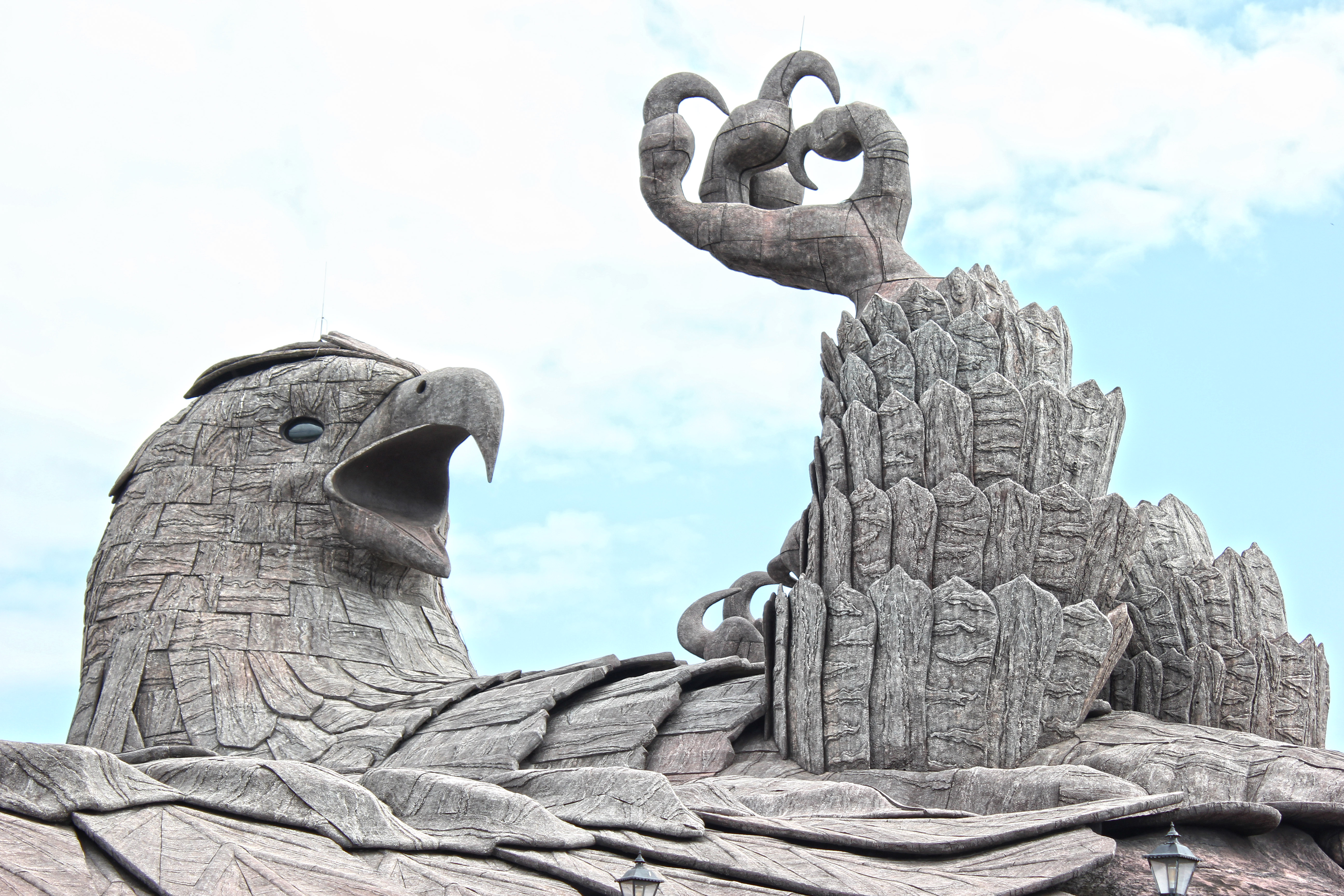

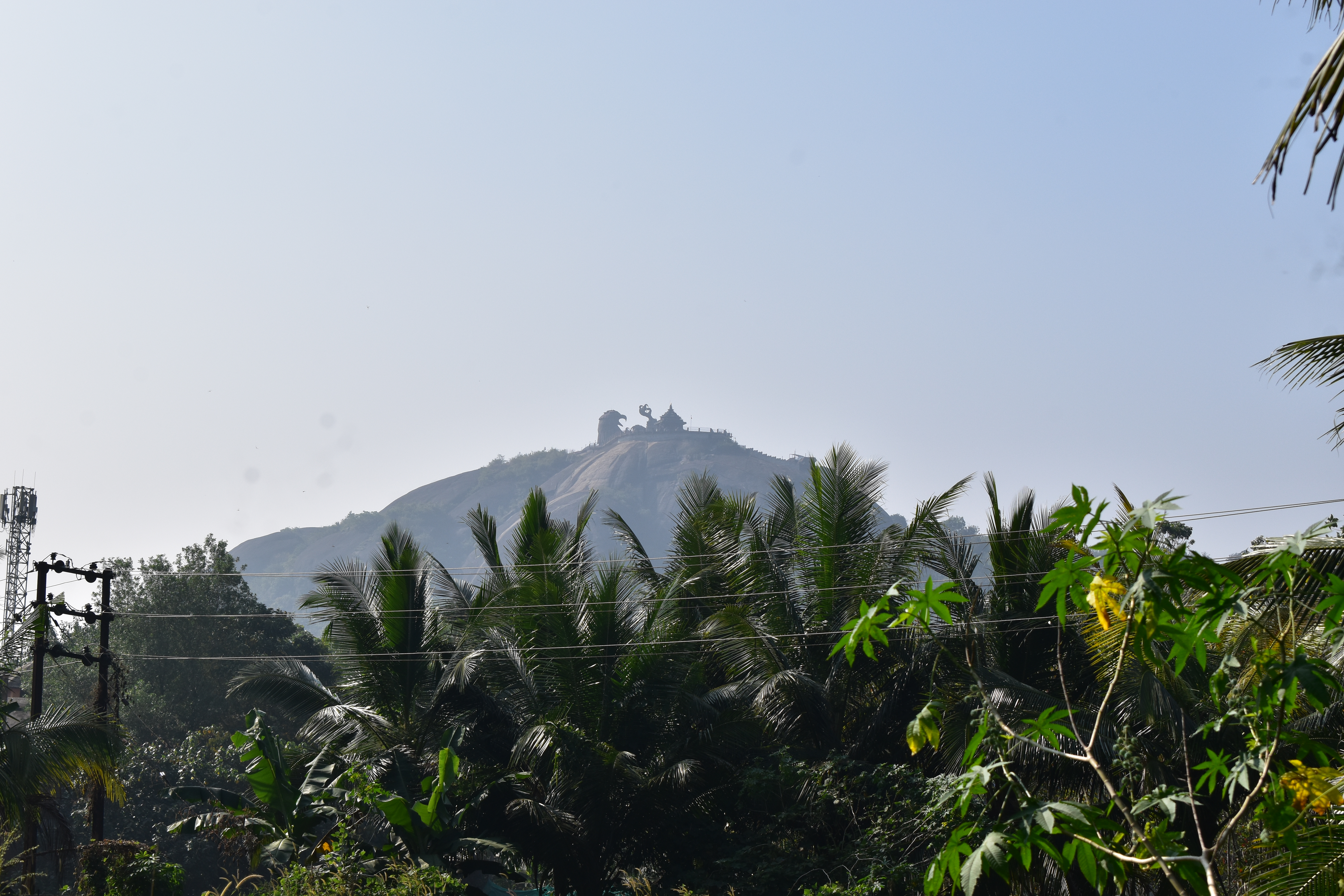
View from distance
