= Chadayamangalam =

Chadayamangalam Jatayumangalam
- Town
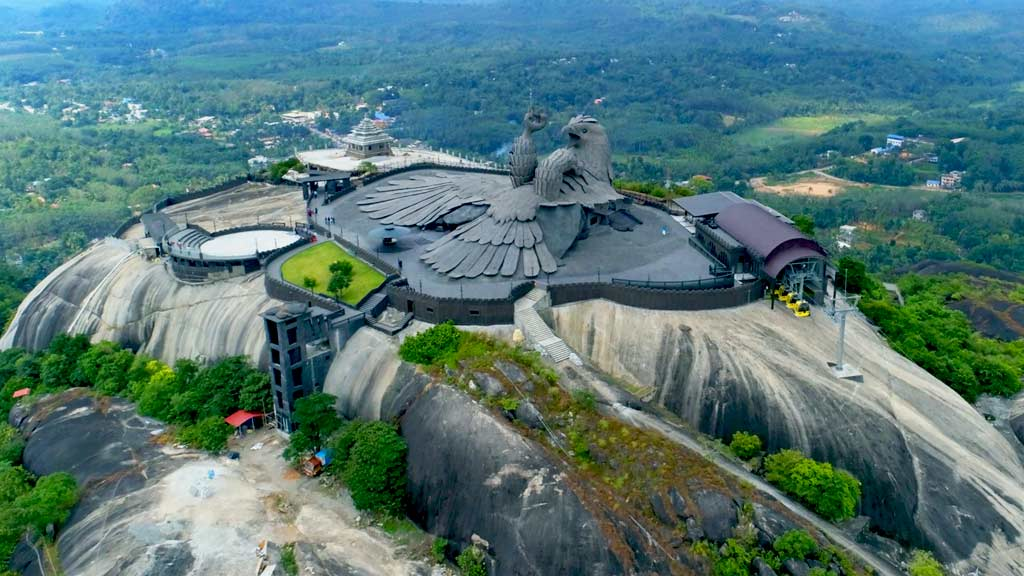
- Jatayu Rock

- Location in Kerala, India Chadayamangalam (India)
- Coordinates: 8.8421200°N 76.864440°E
- Country: India
- State: Kerala
- District: Kollam

Government
  - Type: Panchayati Raj (India)
  - Body: Chadayamangalam Grama Panchayat

Area
  - Total: 26.21 km^{2} (10.12 sq mi)

Population (2011)
  - Total: 22,473
  - Density: 857.4/km^{2} (2,221/sq mi)

Languages
  - Official: Malayalam, English
- Time zone: UTC+5:30 (IST)
- PIN: 691534
- Telephone code: 0474
- Vehicle registration: KL-82

Chadayamangalam is a village located in Kollam district of Kerala state, India. It is located along the Ithikkara river and the MC road that passes across the major urban locations of Kerala. It acts as centre for Chadayamangalam block panchayat, gram panchayat and assembly constituency. It hosts numerous government institutions including hospitals, schools and police station. Chadayamangalam is well noticed for newly constructed Jatayu Earth’s Center, which is a tourism centre in the town with the world’s largest bird sculpture. The place is also referred to as Jatayumangalam.

== Details ==
Chadayamangalam is 37.5 km away from the City of Kollam and 43 km away from the capital city of the state, Thiruvananthapuram. The village is located Kilimanoor and Kottarakara, 14 km away from Kilimanoor and 21 km from Kottarakara. It is situated on the southeast side of Kottarakkara Taluk. Population is of 22,213.

== Historical background ==
The origins of the town is traced by historians to at least 8th-9th century AD. The Ay dynasty which acted as buffer between Pandya and Chera dynasty mainly shifting between independent rule and Pandyan overlordship. The conquest of Ay Kingdom in 765 CE by Pandya king Jatila Paranthaka/Nedum Chadayan Varaguna I (r. 765–815 AD) and sack of port Vizhinjam by defeating the Vel chieftain (the Vel Mannan, who might have been related to the Ay family) possession of the Ay-Vel country ("the fertile country along with its magnificent treasures") (Madras Museum Plates of Jatila Parantaka, 17th year). This event is also remembered in the Velvikkudi plates (3rd regnal year, Nedum Chadayan) as "the suppression of the rebellious Ay-Vel. The Pandya king "Maran Chadayan" Jatila Paranthaka destroyed a fort at Aruviyoor (Aruvikkarai near Thalakulam) by defeating Chadayan Karunanthan of "Malai Nadu" in 788 AD (23rd year, Kalukumalai inscription). In 792 AD (27th year, Jatila Paranthaka) the Chera warriors (the Cheramanar Padai) are seen fighting for a fort at Vizhinjam and at Karaikkotta (Karaikkodu near Thalakulam) against a commander of Maran Chadayan (Thiruvananthapuram Museum Inscription of Maran Chadayan).

This historical evidences points to existing Ay/Vel kings with name Chadayan (Maran Chadayan) along with the invader of the kingdom 'Nedum Chadayan' also holding a similar name. What makes this relatable to the town of Chadayamangalam is the presence of the Kottukal rock cut temple located just inside 4 km from the town center.

This ambiguity is further strengthened as it was time of Pandyan conquest into the Ay kingdom (Pandyans continued to occupy the southern portions around Vizinjam till the next century while northern portions detached away to form Venad.)

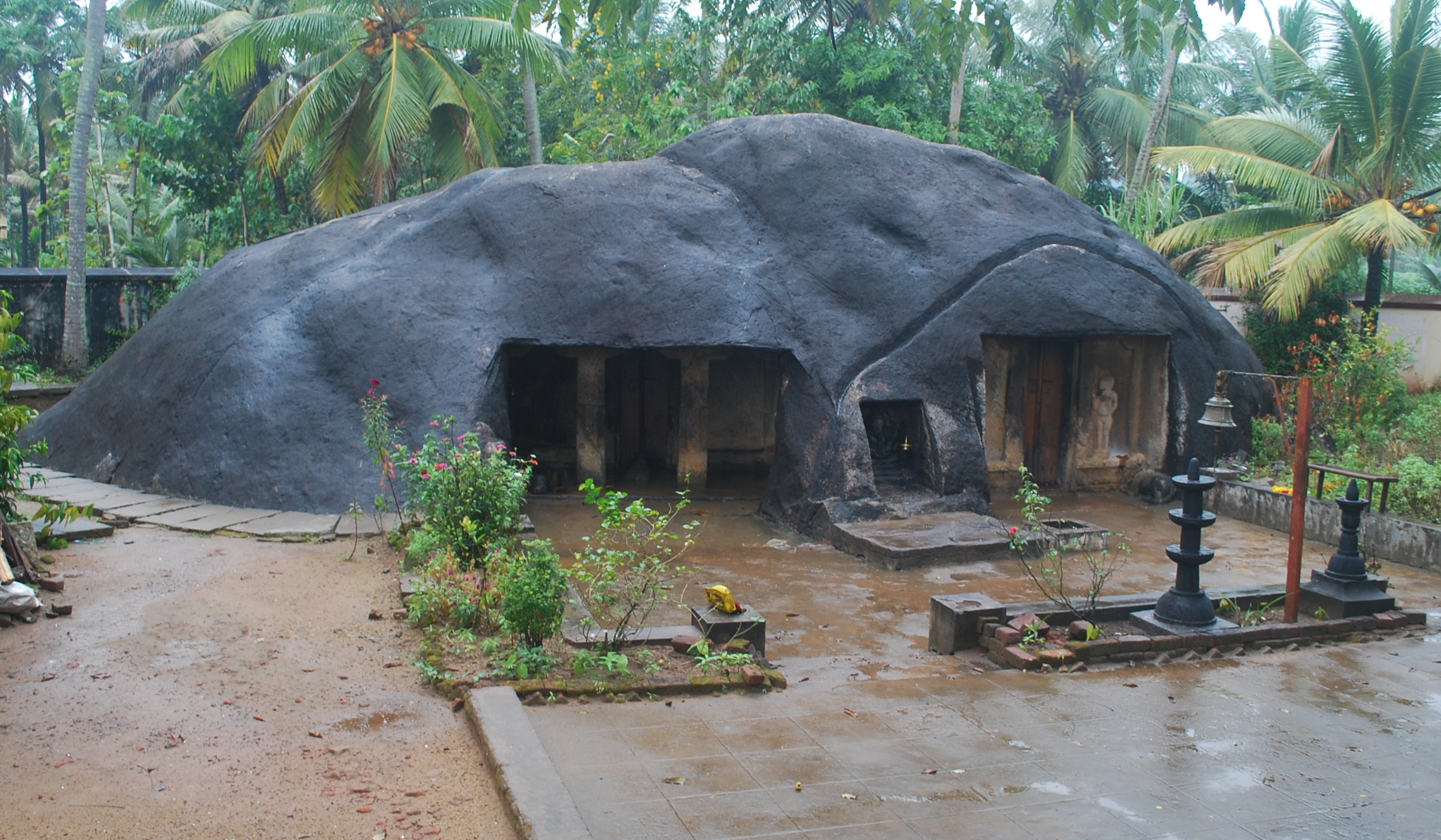
Kottukkal rock cut temple, Chadayamangalam

== Mythological background ==
Araṇya-Kāṇḍa of Ramayana mentions that Jatayu is the "King of Vultures"(gṛdhrarāja). According to the epic, the entity Ravana was abducting the goddess Sita to Lanka when Jatayu tried to rescue her. Jatayu fought valiantly with Ravana, but as Jatayu was very old Ravana soon defeated him, clipping his wings, and Jatayu falls down to earth. Rama and Lakshmana while on the search for Sita, chanced upon the stricken and dying Jatayu, who informed them of the battle with Ravana and told them that Ravana had headed South. Jatayu then died of his wounds and Rama performed his final funeral rites.

Chadayamangalam consists of the Kodandarama temple at the peak of Jadayu para (more commonly called Mellupara) placed 1000 feet above the sea level. Chadayamagalam also has other numerous small mountains like Vayanam Mala, Pavoor Mala, Alathara Mala, Elambrakodu Mala, Arkannur Madappara Mala and Thevannur Mala marking its natural beauty. The associated story in the temple premises include presence of “Kokkarani” (water tank), Jadayu created by rubbing the rock with his beak. As the time has come for the bird to leave his body after hearing narrative of Sitaapaharan, Lord Ram is believed to have performed the last rites of Jadayu. Thus, the Lord granted salvation to Jatayu by standing on one leg on the top of the Jatayu rock, where his foot print surfaced and it exists even now.

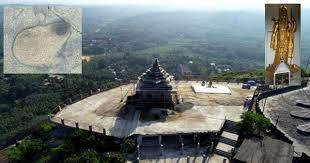
Kodandarama Temple in Chadayamangalam

== Political administration ==
Chadayamangalam village is part of Chadayamangalam state constituency in the Kerala assembly elections and Kollam constituency for the Indian parliament elections.

== See also ==
- Jatayu Earth's Center Nature Park
