= Sampati =

Ramayana character

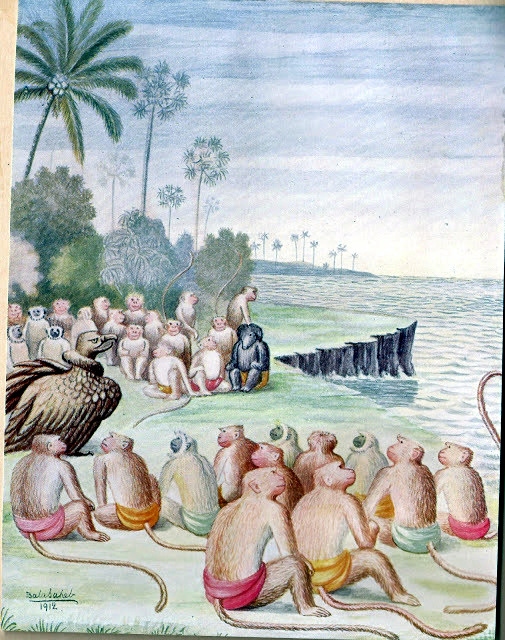
- Sampati (left) meets the Vanaras.
- Texts: Ramayana

Genealogy
- Parents: Aruna (father), Shyeni (mother)
- Siblings: Jatayu
- Children: Babhru, Sighraga (sons)

Sampati (Sanskrit: सम्पाती; IAST: Sampāti) is a demigod in Hinduism. He is the elder son of Aruna, and the elder brother of Jatayu. He has the form of either a vulture or an eagle. Sampati lost his wings when he was young. According to the Brahma Purana, Sampati has a swift and well-known son Babhru.

== Legend ==
=== Flight towards the Sun ===
During their youth, Sampati and his younger brother, Jatayu, in order to test their powers, flew towards Surya, the solar deity. Jatayu, careless due to his youthfulness, outflew his brother, and entered the Sūryamaṇḍala, the orbit of the Sun, during noon. Due to the blazing heat of Surya, his wings started to get scorched. In a desperate bid to rescue his brother, Sampati flew ahead of him, spreading his wings wide open to shield him. As a consequence, Sampati had got his wings burnt, descending towards the Vindhya mountains. Incapacitated, he spent the rest of his life under the protection of a sage named Nishakara, who was performing a penance in the mountains. Sampati is said to have been enlightened with spiritual knowledge in these mountains by sages, who told him to cease lamenting about his broken body, and wait patiently until he is able to serve Rama. He never met his brother alive again.

=== Assisting Rama ===
Sampati meets Hanuman and Jambavan.

Eight millennia after his descent upon the earth, Sampati proves instrumental in the search for Sita in the Ramayana.When the search party went to the south, led by Hanuman with Angada, Jambavan, Nala, and Nila, exhausted and thirsty, they happened to come across the cave of Sampati. The demigod exclaimed his fortune, deciding to consume the vanaras one after the other after they starved to death. Angada heard Sampati, and dejected, proclaimed that death itself had appeared before them in the form of a vulture. He grieved that they had been unable to find Sita, but considered their party to be blessed, just like Jatayu, to die for Rama's cause. Sampati grew anxious hearing his brother's name, enquiring as to whether he was truly dead, and the circumstances of his death.

Angada, Hanuman, and Jambavan recounted the events of Rama's exile, the abduction of Sita, and the heroic death of Jatayu in his attempt to rescue her. Sampati reveals his identity, and tells them that he would have gladly accompanied them to Lanka if he still had his wings, and was not ancient in age. When asked about Sita, he said to them that he had heard her shout Rama's name as she was abducted by Ravana towards Lanka, and his supernatural vision, with which he saw that she was located 1000 yojanas (100 miles) away, on the island. He revealed that his son had come across Ravana, and had gleaned that Sita was at the Ashoka Vatika, a park that was guarded by rakshasis. After this revelation, Sampati's wings grew back, an event that was predicted by Nishakara. He performed the funeral rites of Jatayu.

== In popular culture ==
The Griddhraj Parvat, situated in Satna district in Madhya Pradesh, is believed to be the birthplace of Sampati.
