= Thiruputkuzhi =

Temple town in Tamil Nadu, India

Thiruputkuzhi is a small temple town in Tamil Nadu, India. It is situated about 7 miles west of Kanchipuram and half a kilometre from Baluchetti Chattiram which lies on the Chennai - Vellore highway. The place is known after the Vijayaraghava Perumal temple.

== History ==
The history of the place is surrounded around the Vijayaraghava Perumal temple. The temple is believed to have been built by the Pandya kings during the 13th century, as seen from the stone inscriptions in the temple. The temple here is one among the 108 Divya Desams and is dedicated to Lord Vijayaraghavaswamy (Moolavar). There is a separate temple for Thayar in the form of Margathavalli Thayar and a sannidhi for Sri Ramanuja as well.

== Legend ==
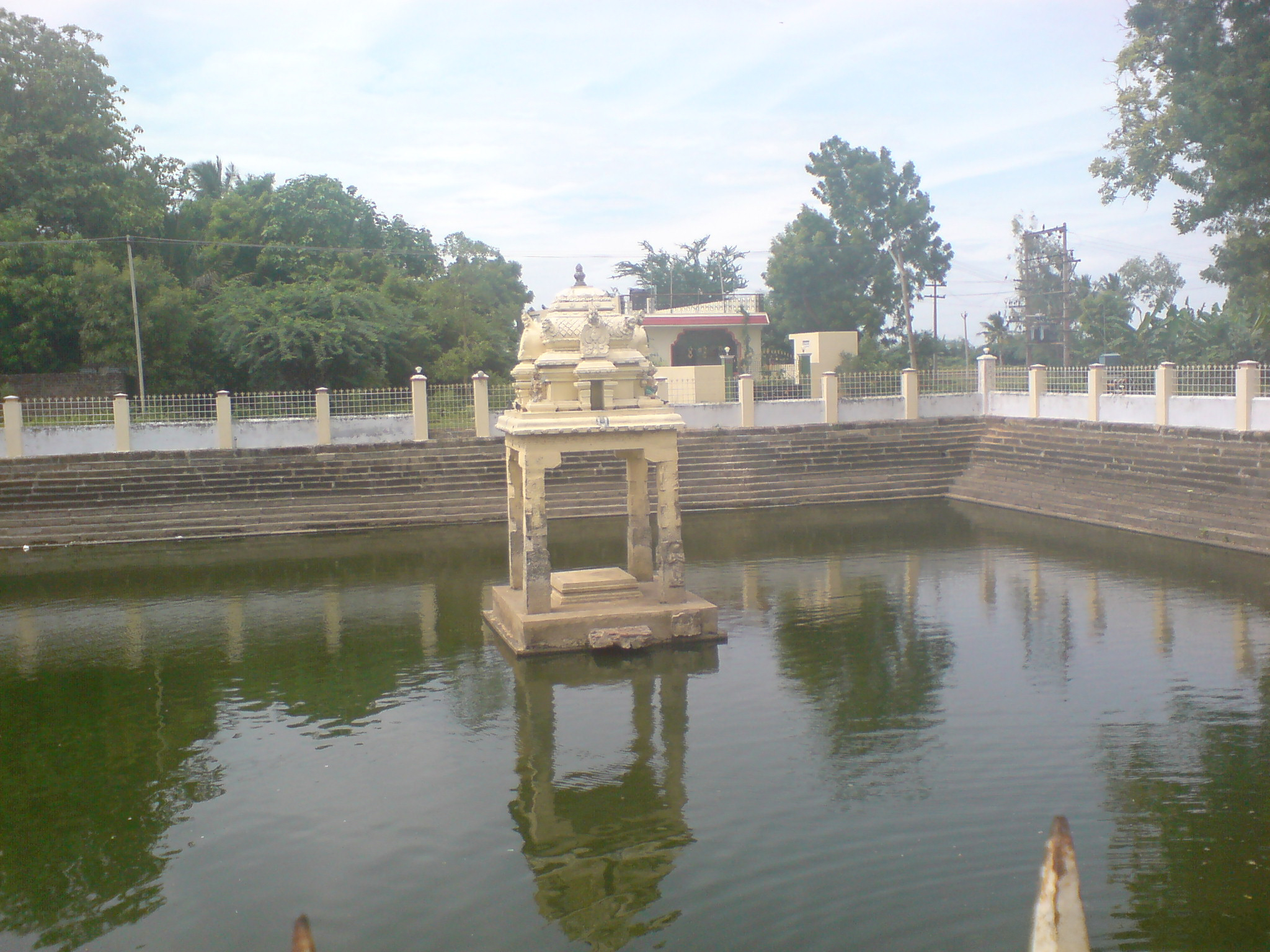
Temple Tank

Legend says that Sri Rama left all of his properties and went to the forest as ordered by his father. While in the forest, Sita spots a golden deer and requests Rama to catch it for her. The deer however is a demon sent by Ravana to lure Rama and Lakshmana, so that he could carry away Sita. With Rama and Lakshmana out in search of the deer, Ravana abducts Sita and takes her along with him to Lanka. On the way to Lanka, Jatayu the vulture stops Ravana and fights with him to release Sita, but Ravana cuts Jatayu's wings and he falls down to the earth.

When Rama and Lakshmana go there in search of Sita, they find Jatayu mortally wounded in the forest. Jatayu tells them about Ravana and Sita, and then dies. Sri Rama then performs the last rites for Jatayu. As suggested by Jatayu, the Perumal here gives his seva in the form in which he performed the final funeral of Jatayu.

Jatayu belongs to the Pul (a separate family of eagle) family and was buried in a pit (Tamil kuzhi), hence this sthalam is called Thiruputkuzhi. The eagle Jatayu narrated the events to Rama before breathing his last. The presiding deity, Vijayaraghava Perumal is believed to have performed the last rites of Jataya at this place. The water body where Jatayu fell is called Jatayu Theertham.

== External ==
- "Thiruputkuzhi - Sri Vijayaraghava Perumal Temple, Tirupukuzhi". Divyadesam.com.
- "Thiruputkuzhi Sri Vijayaraghava Perumal Temple". Sri Vaishnavam Practices.
- "Sri Vijayaraghava Perumal – Thiruputkuzhi". SouthDreamZ.
