= Swamimalai =

- Panchayat town
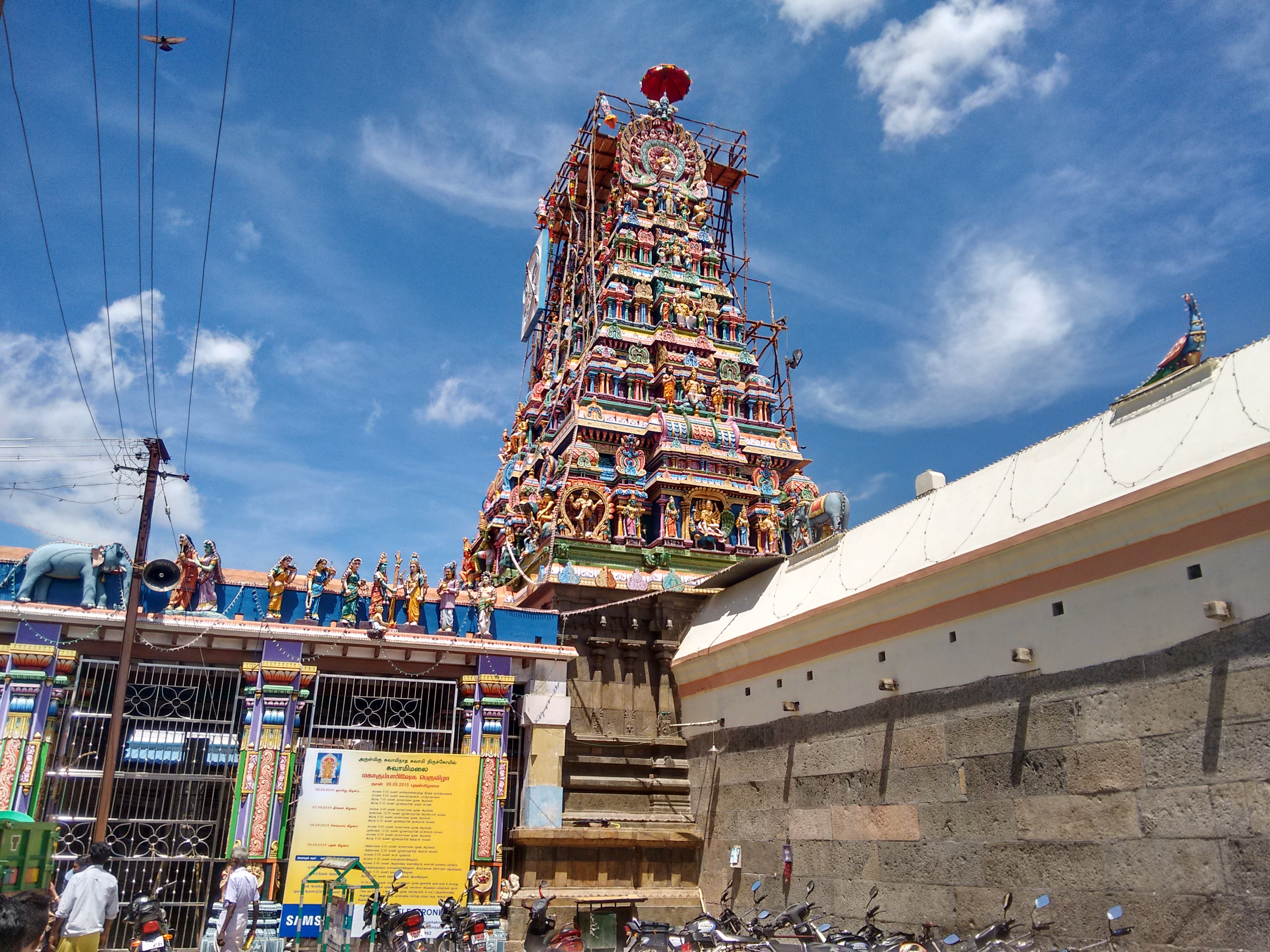
- Swamimalai Murugan Temple

- Swamimalai, Tamil Nadu
- Coordinates: 10.9596°N 79.3325°E
- Country: India
- State: Tamil Nadu
- District: Thanjavur
- Elevation: 55 m (180 ft)

Population (2001)
  - Total: 6,985

Languages
  - Official: Tamil
- Time zone: UTC+5:30 (IST)

Swamimalai is a panchayat town that is a suburb near Kumbakonam in Thanjavur District in the Indian state of Tamil Nadu. It lies on the banks of river Kaveri and is the site of the fourth of the six abodes of the Hindu deity Murugan (Kartikeya).

== Mythology ==
According to Hindu mythology, Murugan is described to explain the meaning of pranava mantra (Om) to father Shiva, the site of which is regarded to be Swamimalai in regional tradition. In the Murugan temple of the town, Murugan is depicted as a guru (teacher) and Shiva listening as shishya (disciple) in the gopuram of the temple complex. The form of Murugan is known by the epithet Swaminathan and Tagapan Swami in this site.

== Geography ==
Swamimalai is located at 10.95°N 79.33°E. It has an average elevation of 25 metres (82 feet).

=== Topography ===
It lies on the banks of river Kaveri

== Demographics ==
=== Population ===
As of 2001 India census, Swamimalai had a population of 6985. Males constitute 49% of the population and females 51%. Swamimalai has an average literacy rate of 75%, higher than the national average of 59.5%: male literacy is 80%, and female literacy is 70%. In Swamimalai, 11% of the population is under 6 years of age.

== Government and politics ==
It is a panchayat town that is a suburb near Kumbakonam in Thanjavur District.

== Culture ==
=== Art and handicrafts ===
Swamimalai Bronze Icons refers to bronze idols and statues manufactured in Swamimalai. It has been recognized as a Geographical indication by the Government of India in 2008–09. During the reign of Chola empire, Raja Raja I commissioned a group of sculptors for the construction of the Brihadeeswarar Temple at Thanjavur. The sculptors helped sculpt statues for Airavatesvara Temple and later settled at Swamimalai.

== See also ==
- Sacred mountains of India
