= Animal worship =

Glorification of animal deities

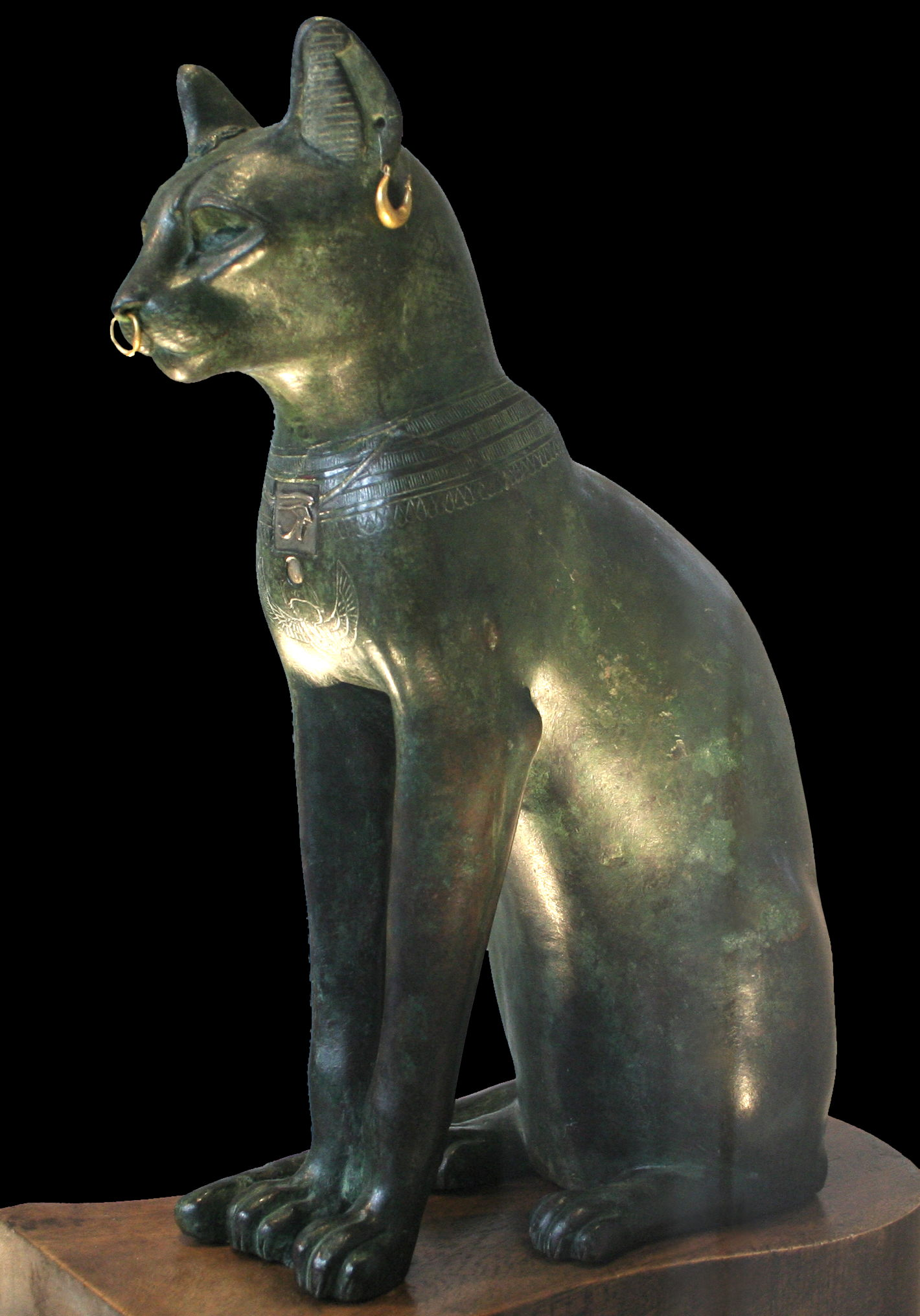
The Gayer-Anderson cat statue, representing the ancient Egyptian goddess Bastet. Cats in ancient Egypt were revered as deities.

Animal worship (also zoolatry or theriolatry) is an umbrella term designating religious or ritual practices involving animals. This includes the worship of animal deities or animal sacrifice. An animal 'cult' is formed when a species is taken to represent a religious figure. Animal cults can be classified according to their formal features or by their symbolic content.

The classical author Diodorus situated the origin of animal worship in a myth in which the gods, threatened by giants, disguised themselves as animals. The people then began to worship these animals and continued even after the gods returned to their normal state. In 1906, Weissenborn suggested that animal worship resulted from humans' fascination with the natural world. Primitive man would observe an animal that had a unique trait and the inexplicability would engender curiosity. Wonder resulted from primitive man's observations of this distinctive trait. As such, primitive man worshipped animals that had inimitable traits. Lubbock proposed that animal worship originated from family names. In societies, families would name themselves and their children after certain animals and eventually came to hold that animal above other animals. Eventually, these opinions turned into deep respect and evolved into fully developed worship of the family animal. The belief that an animal is sacred frequently results in dietary laws prohibiting their consumption. As well as holding certain animals to be sacred, religions have also adopted the opposite attitude, that certain animals are unclean.

The idea that divinity embodies itself in animals, such as a deity incarnate, and then lives on earth among human beings is disregarded by Abrahamic religions. Sects deemed heretical such as the Waldensians were accused of animal worship. In Pentecostal churches, animals have very little religious significance. Animals have become less and less important and symbolic in cult rituals and religion, especially among African cultures, as Christianity and Islamic religions have spread.

The Egyptian pantheon was especially fond of zoomorphism, with many animals sacred to particular deities—cats to Bastet, ibises and baboons to Thoth, crocodiles to Sobek and Ra, fish to Set, mongoose, shrew and birds to Horus, dogs and jackals to Anubis, serpents and eels to Atum, beetles to Khepera, bulls to Apis. Animals were often mummified as a result of these beliefs. In Wicca, the Horned God represents an animal-human deity.

== Hunting cults ==
=== Bear ===
There is evidence that connects the Greek goddess Artemis with a cult of the bear. Girls danced as "bears" in her honour, and might not marry before undergoing this ceremony. According to mythology, the goddess once transformed a nymph into a bear and then into the constellation Ursa Major.

The existence of an ancient bear cult among Neanderthals in the Middle Paleolithic period has been a topic of discussion spurred by archaeological findings. Ancient bear bones have been discovered in several different caves and their peculiar arrangement is believed by some archaeologists to be evidence of a bear cult during the Paleolithic era.

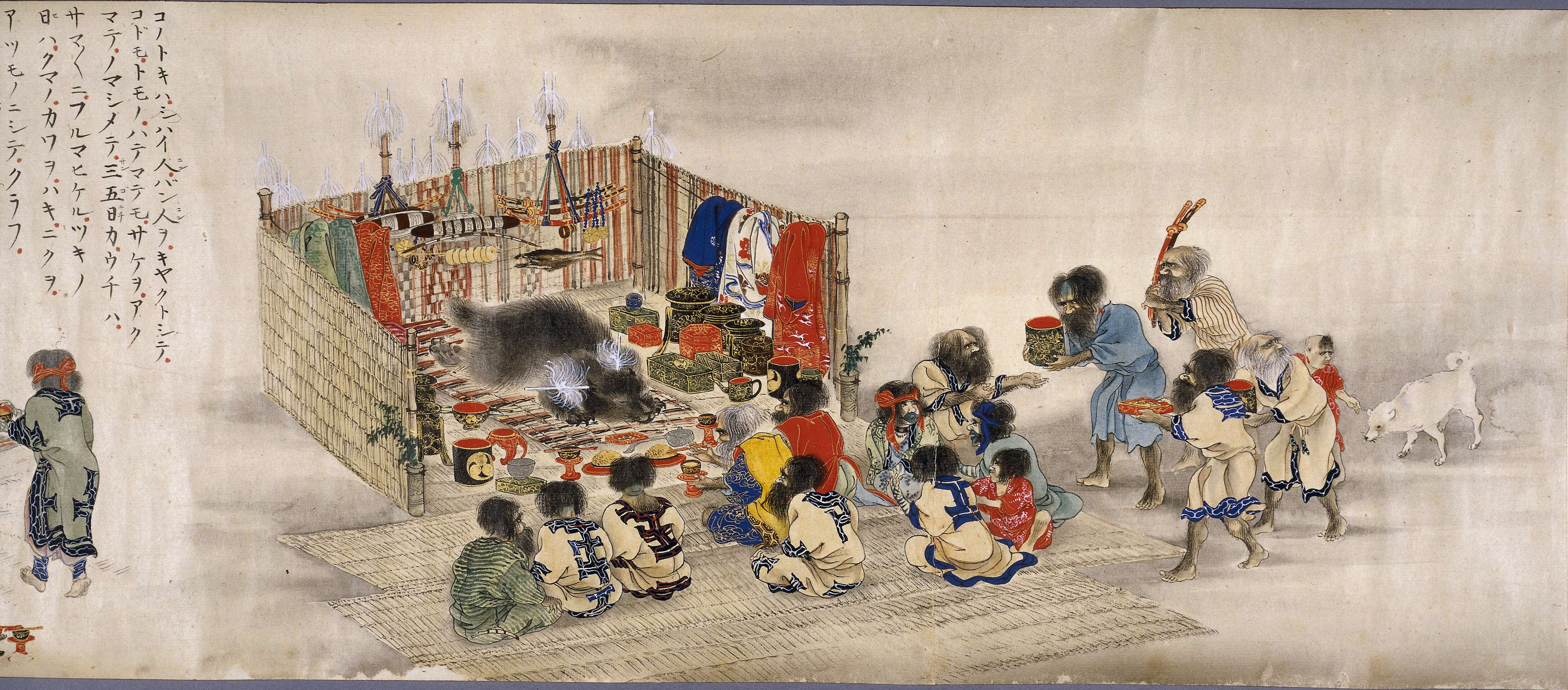
The Ainu Iomante ceremony (bear sending). Japanese scroll painting, circa 1870

The Ainu people, who live on select islands in the Japanese archipelago, call the bear "kamui" in their language, which translates to mean god. While many other animals are considered to be gods in the Ainu culture, the bear is the head of the gods. For the Ainu, when the gods visit the world of man, they don fur and claws and take on the physical appearance of an animal. Usually, however, when the term "kamui" is used, it essentially means a bear. The Ainu people willingly and thankfully ate the bear as they believed that the disguise (the flesh and fur) of any god was a gift to the home that the god chose to visit.

=== Whale ===
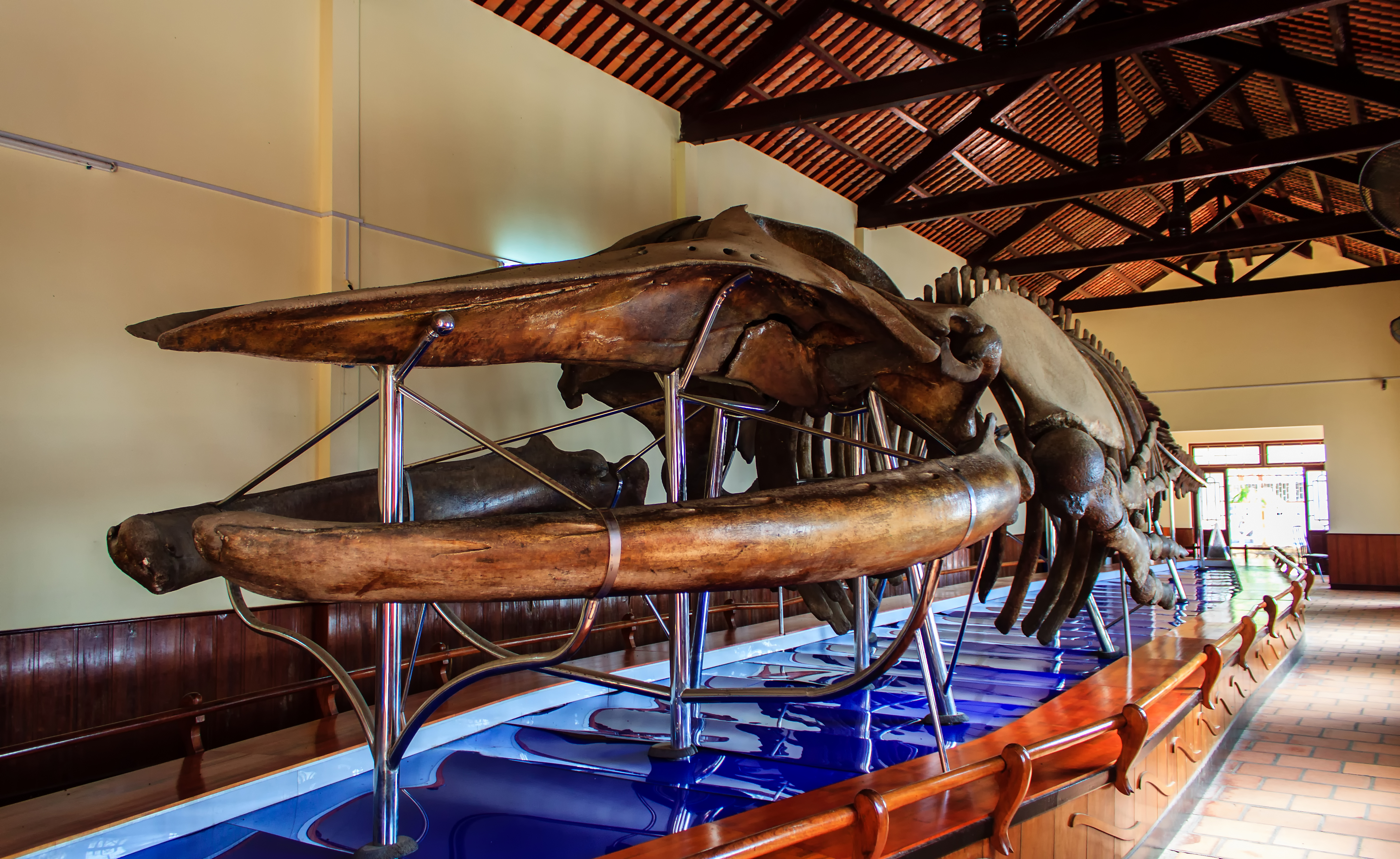
The largest whale skeleton in Vietnam at Vạn Thủy Tú temple, one of Vietnamese Whale worship in Vietnamese folk religions

Whales were little understood for most of human history as they spend up to 90% of their lives underwater, only surfacing briefly to breathe. Many cultures, even those that have hunted them, hold whales in awe and feature them in their mythologies.

A prevalent whale cult in Japan occurs around the coastal area. There are cemeteries with memorial stones dedicated to the whales which were hunted and killed to feed the people. Buddhist epitaphs mark these stones which implore that Buddha is reborn as a whale. Along with these memorials, there is evidence that whale embryos, found in a deceased mother's womb, were extracted and buried with the same respect as a human being. For certain shrines, the bones of a perished whale were also deposited in the area.

In Alaska, there are cultures that have ceremonial tributes to whales after they are captured in a hunt. Some tribes bring the hump, the fins, or the nose of the whale into their camps or the whaler's house. These parts are meant to represent the entirety of the whale and are honored as such during the festival. The bones of a whale are also given ritual treatment. The Alaskan tribes that participate in such acts believe that their ceremonies protect the whale's soul from injury and the soul can then be free to return to the sea.

In China, Yu-kiang, a whale with the hands and feet of a man, was said to rule the ocean.

In the Tyrol region of Austria, it was said that if a sunbeam were to fall on a maiden entering womanhood, she would be carried away in the belly of a whale.

Paikea (also Maori name for humpback whales), the youngest and favourite son of the chief Uenuku from the island of Mangaia, in the present day Cook Islands, was said by the Kati Kuri people of Kaikōura to have come from the Pacific Islands on the back of the whale Tohora (Māori name for southern right whales) many centuries before.

The whale features in Inuit creation myths. When 'Big Raven', a deity in human form, found a stranded whale, he was told by the Great Spirit where to find special mushrooms that would give him the strength to drag the whale back to the sea and thus return the order to the world.

The Tlingit people of northern Canada say that the orcas were created when the hunter Natsihlane carved eight fish from yellow cedar, sang his most powerful spirit song and commanded the fish to leap into the water.

In Icelandic legend, a man threw a stone at a fin whale and hit the blowhole, causing the whale to burst. The man was told not to go to sea for twenty years, but in the nineteenth year he went fishing and a whale came and killed him.

In East African legend, King Sulemani asked God that he might permit him to feed all the beings on earth. A whale came and ate until there was no corn left and then told Sulemani that he was still hungry and that there were 70,000 more in his tribe. Sulemani then prayed to God for forgiveness and thanked the creature for teaching him a lesson in humility.

Some cultures that associate divinity with whales, such as some Ghanaians and Vietnamese (also known as Cá Ông), coastal Chinese except for southernmost region, Japanese (also known as Ebisu), occasionally hold funerals for beached whales; a throwback to Vietnam's ancient sea-based Austro-Asiatic culture. See also the below-mentioned Ebisu in fish part for more details. In some lore, whales have been told to work for Ryūgū-jō as well.

Indigenous Ainu tribes on Hokkaido revered killer whales as Repun Kamuy, "God of Sea/Offshore" in their folklore and myths that the deities will bring fortunes (whales) to coastal people.

== Domesticated mammals ==
=== Cattle and buffalo ===
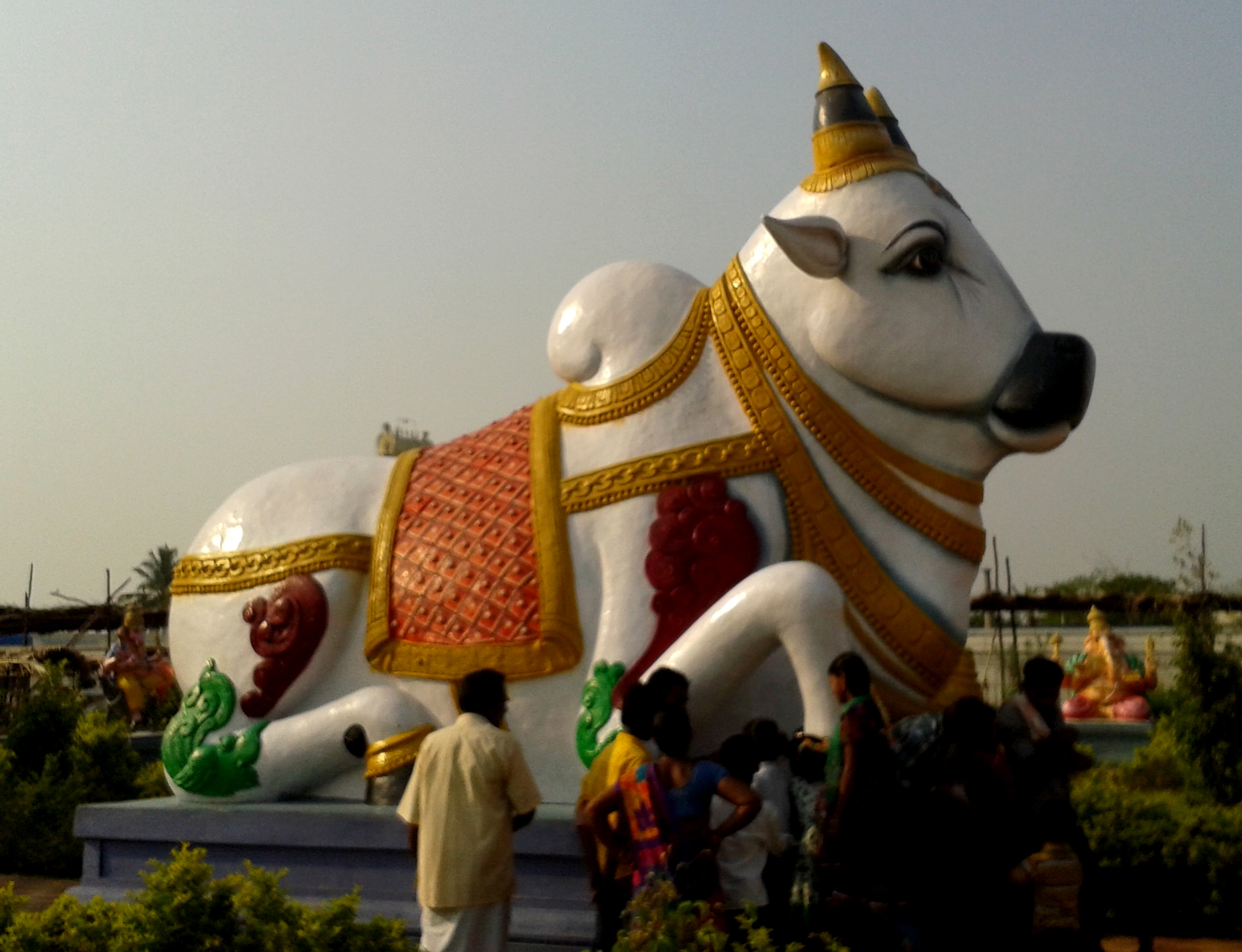
A statue of Nandi at the Lord Shiva Temple in Kanipakam

Many religions have considered cattle to be sacred, most famously Hinduism from India and Nepal, but also Zoroastrianism, and ancient Greek and Egyptian religion. Cattle and buffalo are respected by many pastoral peoples that rely on the animals for sustenance and the killing of an ox is a sacrificial function.

The Toda of southern India abstain from the flesh of their domestic animal, the buffalo. However, once a year they sacrifice a bull calf, which is eaten in the forest by the adult males. The buffalo plays an important part in many Toda rituals. These buffalo are currently endangered.

The Ancient Egyptians worshipped a great number of deities who were either depicted entirely as cattle, or incorporated cattle features in their appearance. Hesat, a goddess of milk and motherhood, was depicted as a full cow, as was Mehet-weret, a sky goddess, identified as the Celestial Cow whose body made up the sky, and whose four legs marked the four cardinal directions. Bat (goddess), a goddess of music and dance, was depicted as a woman with bovine ears and horns, as was Hathor, a very major goddess who borrowed a lot of her attributes from Bat. The great antiquity of the worship of Bat is evidenced by her appearance on the Narmer Palette, made by the very first of the dynastic pharaohs. When identified with the Celestial Cow Mehet-weret, the sky goddess Nut may also take the form of a cow, as in the Book of the Heavenly Cow. When acting in her role as a heavenly goddess, the mother goddess Isis may also be shown with bovine horns, adopting the traditional headdress of Hathor.

As well as these female cow goddesses, the Egyptians also had a number of male bull gods. Conspicuous among these was the bull god Apis, who was embodied in a living bull kept at the Temple of Ptah at Memphis. Regarded as Ptah's herald, the Apis bull was distinguished by certain marks, and when the old bull died a new one was sought. The finder was rewarded, and the bull underwent four months' education at Nilopolis. Its birthday was celebrated once a year when oxen, which had to be pure white, were sacrificed to it. Women were forbidden to approach it once its education was finished. Oracles were obtained from it in various ways. After its death, it was mummified and buried in a rock tomb. A similar practice was in place at Heliopolis with the Mnevis bull, the herald of Ra, and at Hermonthis with the Buchis bull, the herald of Montu. After their death, all these sacred bulls were considered to become part of Osiris.

Similar observances are found in our own day on the Upper Nile. The Nuba and Nuer revere cattle. The Angoni of Central Africa and the Sakalava of Madagascar keep sacred bulls. In India respect for the cow is widespread, but is of post-Vedic origin; there is little actual worship, but the products of the cow are important in magic.

While there are several animals that are worshipped in India, the supreme position is held by the cow. The humped zebu, a breed of cow, is central to the religion of Hinduism. Mythological legends have supported the sanctity of the zebu throughout India. Such myths have included the creation of a divine cow mother and cow heaven by the God, Brahma and Prithu, the sovereign of the universe, who created the earth's vegetation, edible fruits, and vegetables, disguised as a cow.

According to Tadeusz Margul, observations of the Hindu religion and the cow have led to a misunderstanding that Hindi has a servile relationship with the zebu, giving prayers and offerings to it daily. Typically, however, only during the Cow Holiday, an annual event, is the cow the recipient of such practices. Margul suggests that the sanctity of the cow is based on four foundations: abstaining from cow slaughter, abstaining from beef consumption, control of breeding and ownership, and belief in the purification qualities of cow products (milk, curd, ghee, dung, and urine).

=== Sheep ===
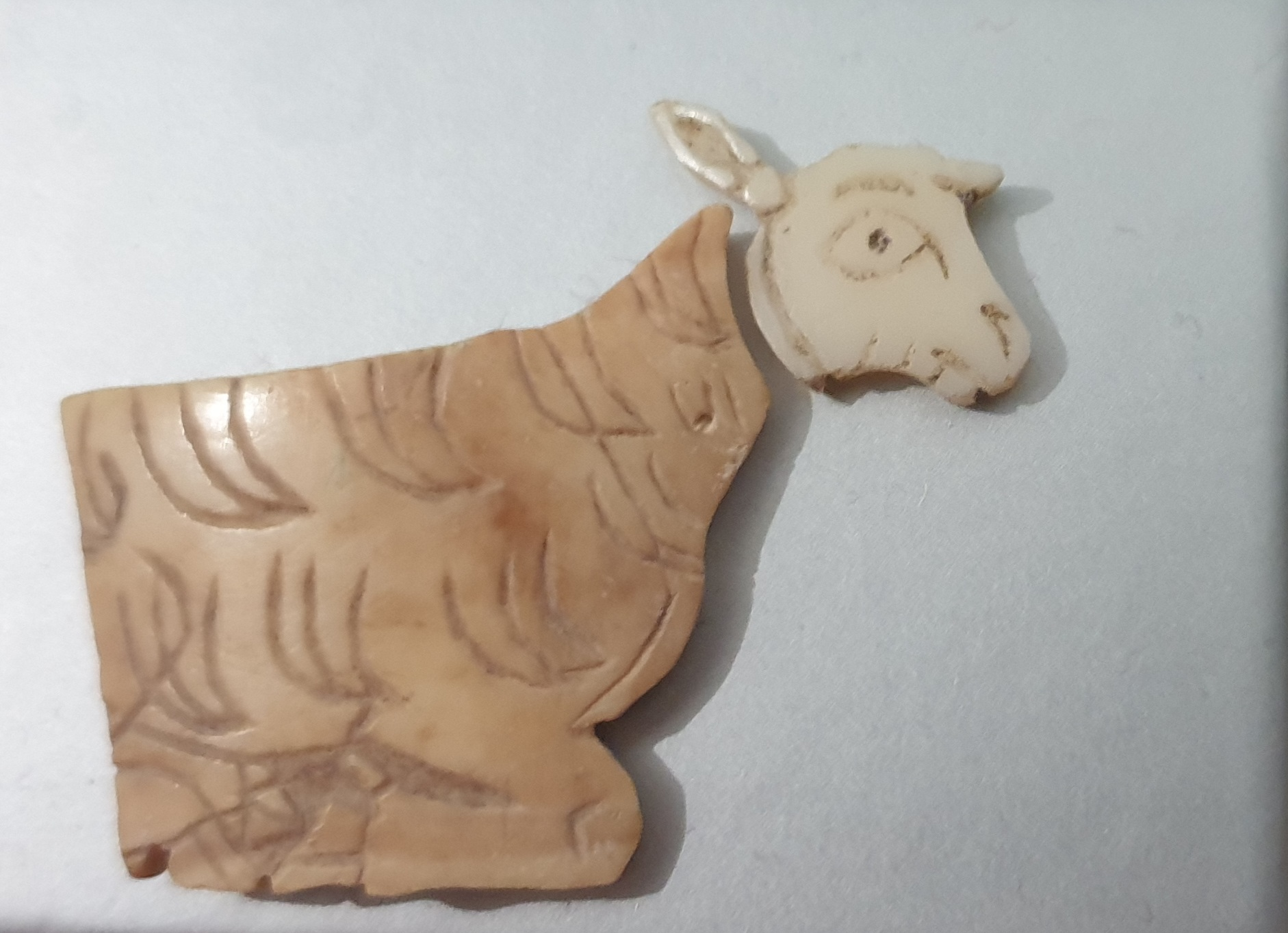
A Sumerian group of two separate shell inlay fragments forming the body and head of a sheep. Circa 27th–24th century BC. From a Mayfair gallery, London, UK

The Ancient Egyptians worshipped several gods with the head of a ram, including Khnum, Heryshaf, Banebdjedet, Ra (sometimes) and Kherty. Amun, the god of Thebes, Egypt, was also associated with the ram, and in later periods was sometimes represented as ram-headed. His worshippers held the ram to be sacred, however, it was sacrificed once a year. Its fleece formed the clothing of the idol.

=== Goat ===
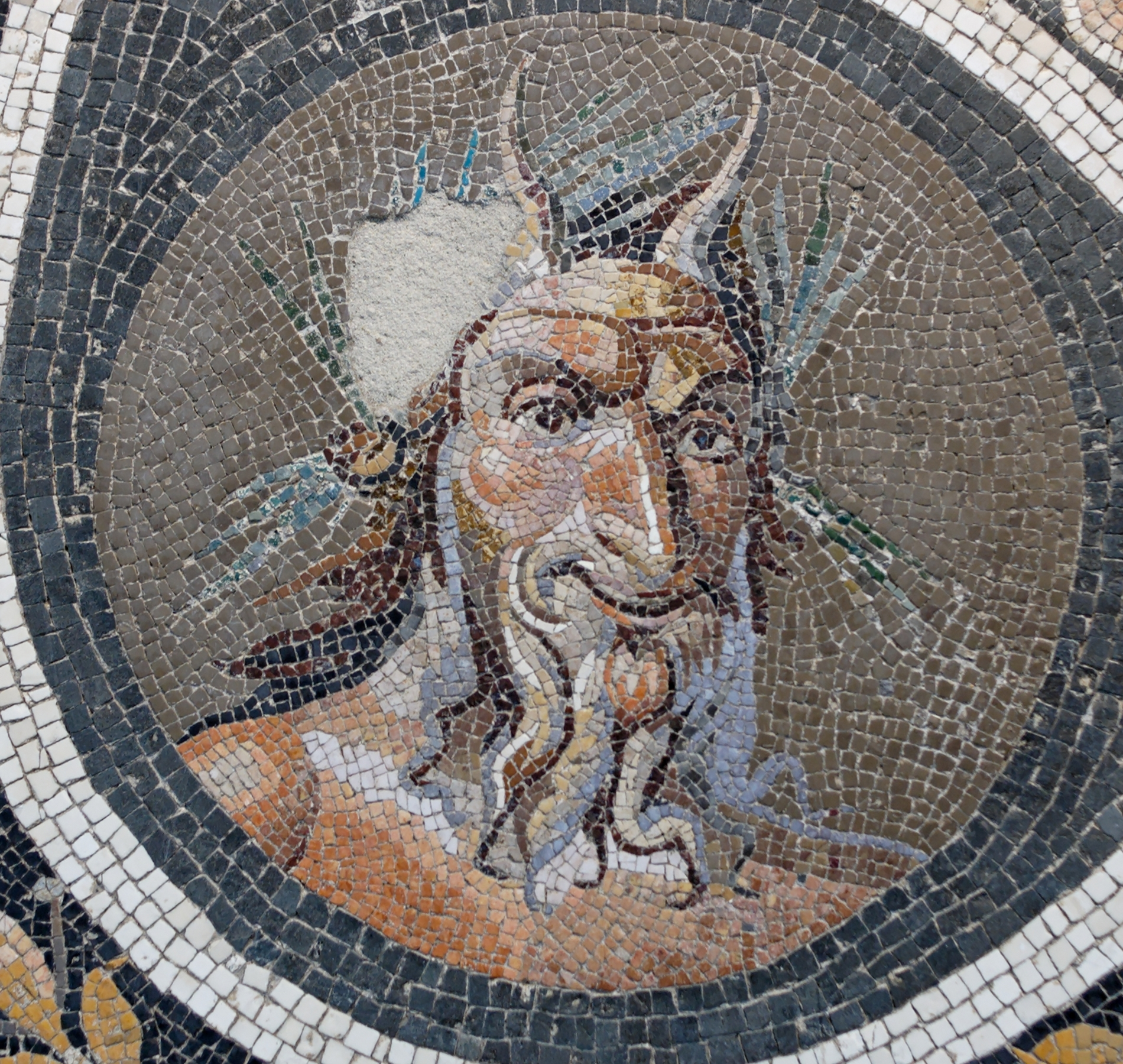
Pavement mosaic with the head of Pan. Roman artwork, Antonine period, 138–192 CE

Silenus, the Satyrs, and the Fauns were either capriform or had some part of their bodies shaped like that of a goat. In northern Europe the wood spirit, Leszi, is believed to have a goat's horns, ears and legs. A deity known as the Goat of Mendes is associated with the pentagram.

In Greece, Italy, and Egypt, the goat was worshipped in both goat form and phallic form. This type of worship has sometimes been said to have originated from the goat's increased sex drive. One male goat was capable of fertilizing 150 females. The Greek god Pan was depicted as having goat characteristics, such as hooves, horns, and a beard. Along with Pan, the goat was closely related to Dionysus during the Roman era. To honor Dionysus, Romans would tear apart a goat and eat it alive. The goat was commonly associated with dark arts and the devil. This association was amplified in Egypt during the Middle Ages.

Excavations in Central Asia have revealed ancient ritual goat-burial that show the religious significance of the goat predominantly in the area. These findings have been used as evidence for a goat cult in Asia originating either in the Neolithic or Bronze Ages.

=== Dog ===
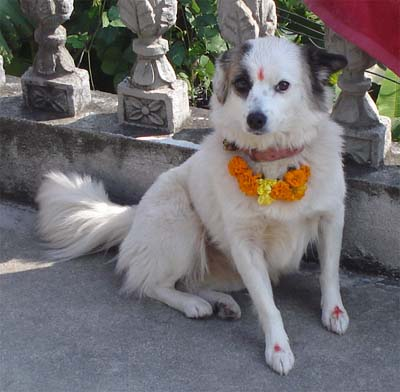
A dog after being decorated in the Kukur tihar festival in Nepal

Dogs have a major religious significance among the Hindus in Nepal and some parts of India. The dogs are worshipped as a part of a five-day Tihar festival that falls roughly in November every year. In Hinduism, it is believed that the dog is a messenger of Yama, the god of death, and dogs guard the doors of Heaven. Socially, they are believed to be the protectors of our homes and lives. So, in order to please the dogs they are going to meet at Heaven's doors after death, so they would be allowed in Heaven, people mark the 14th day of the lunar cycle in November as Kukur-tihar, as known in the Nepali language for the dog's day. This is a day when the dog is worshipped by applying tika (the holy vermilion dot), incense sticks, and garlanded generally with marigold flower.

Actual dog worship is uncommon. The Nosarii of western Asia are said to worship a dog. The Karang of Java had a cult of the red dog, with each family keeping one in the house. According to one authority, the dogs are images of wood that are worshipped after the death of a member of the family and burnt after a thousand days. In Nepal it is said that dogs are worshipped at the festival called Khicha Puja. Among the Harranians dogs were sacred, but this was rather as brothers of the mystae.

=== Horse ===
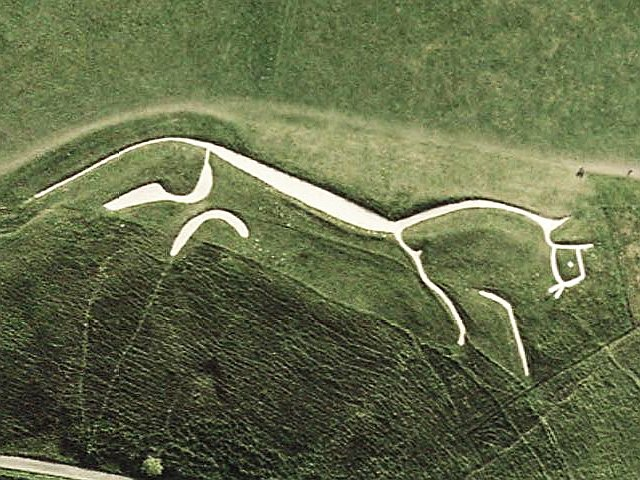
The Uffington White Horse

Horse worship has been practiced by a number of Indo-European and Turkic peoples. In the nomadic tradition, the horse is one of the mythological animals, embodying the connection with the other world, with the supernatural. The horse, exceptionally white, has always been associated with the sun, with daytime clarity, with fire, air, sky, water, and solar heroes, as an expression of good human aspirations in daily work and struggle against difficulties. The white sun horse is an attribute of divine forces that are constantly fighting against evil—an opposition to death.

In the beliefs and rites of the nomads, first, the horse itself, second, its separate parts—the skull, cervical vertebrae, skin, hair, and third, objects associated with it—bridle, clamp, sweat, reins, whip, fallen horseshoe, image, etc., act as the patroness and protector of people. The horse is seen to have the ability to drive out evil forces from the human body.

A bronze top with the image of a horse was found in the Ferghana Valley in the early twentieth century, the only one found so far in the Eurasian steppes. It was dated to the period between 4th and 1st century BC and was claimed to have been used in rituals dedicated to the cult of Heavenly Horses.

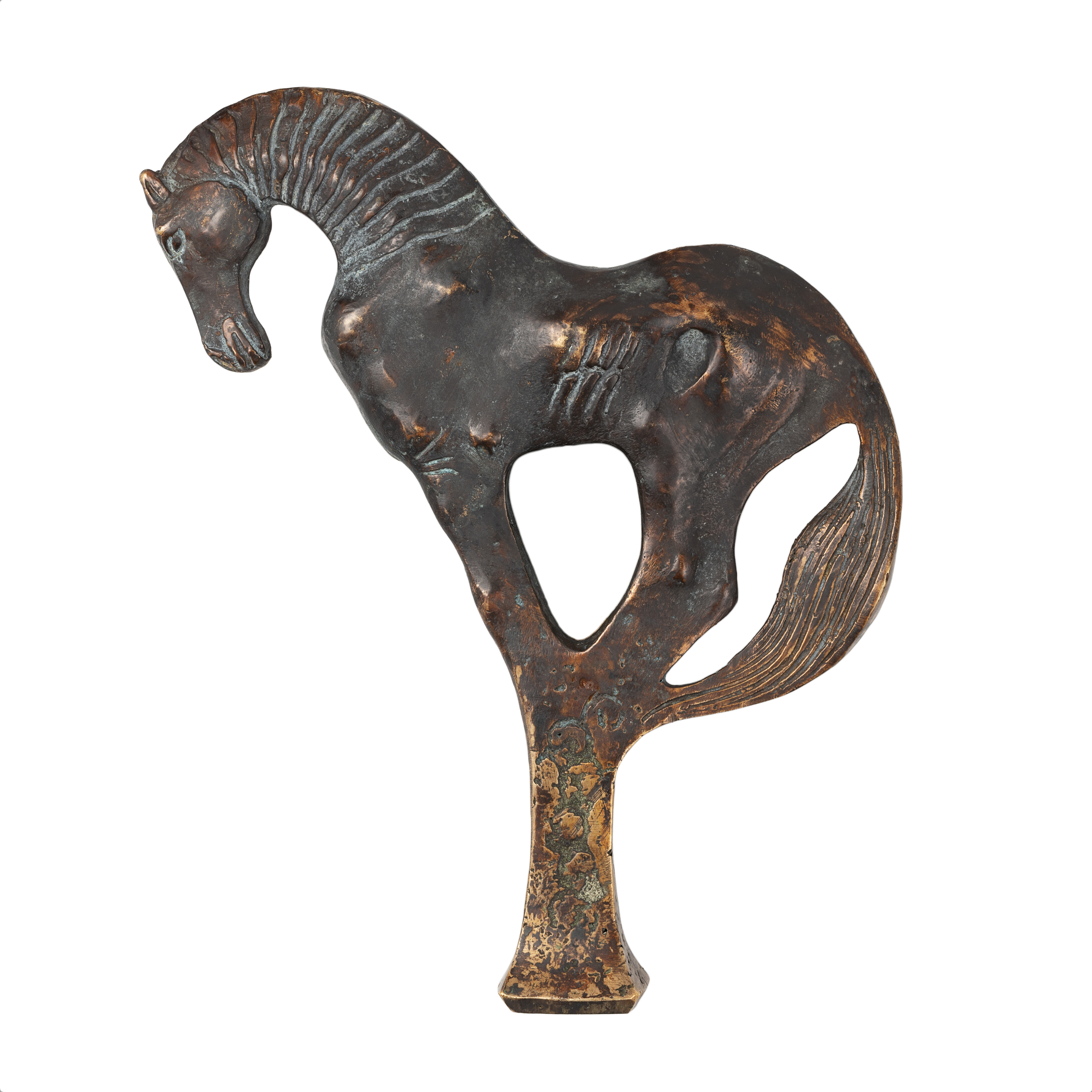
Heavenly horse. Bronze ceremonial finial produced during the Greco-Bactrian Kingdom.

There is some reason to believe that Poseidon, like other water gods, was originally conceived under the form of a horse. In the cave of Phigalia Demeter was, according to popular tradition, represented with the head and mane of a horse, possibly a relic of the time when a non-specialized corn-spirit bore this form. Her priests were called Poloi (Greek for "colts") in Laconia. The mule and the horse are sacred to the Roman god Consus. In Gaul we find a horse-goddess, Epona. There are also traces of a horse god, Rudiobus. Hayagriva is a horse-headed deity that appears in both Hinduism and Buddhism. The Gonds in India worship a horse god, Koda Pen, in the form of a shapeless stone, but it is not clear that the horse is regarded as divine. The horse or mare is a common form of the corn spirit in Europe.

Among the Balkan culture, swaddling an unmarried person in a horse girth is a typical ritual. It is thought that the sexual potency of the horse is passed to the individual wrapped in its girth. Along with the Balkan swaddling, Virgil's Aeneid bases the founding of the great city of Carthage upon a horse. When the Phoenicians dug up a horse head from the ground they decided to build their city (Carthage) upon that spot because the horse was a sign of success. Thus, Brown argued that the horse was sacred to the Phoenician people.

Horses are godlike beings to Romani people.

=== Elephant ===
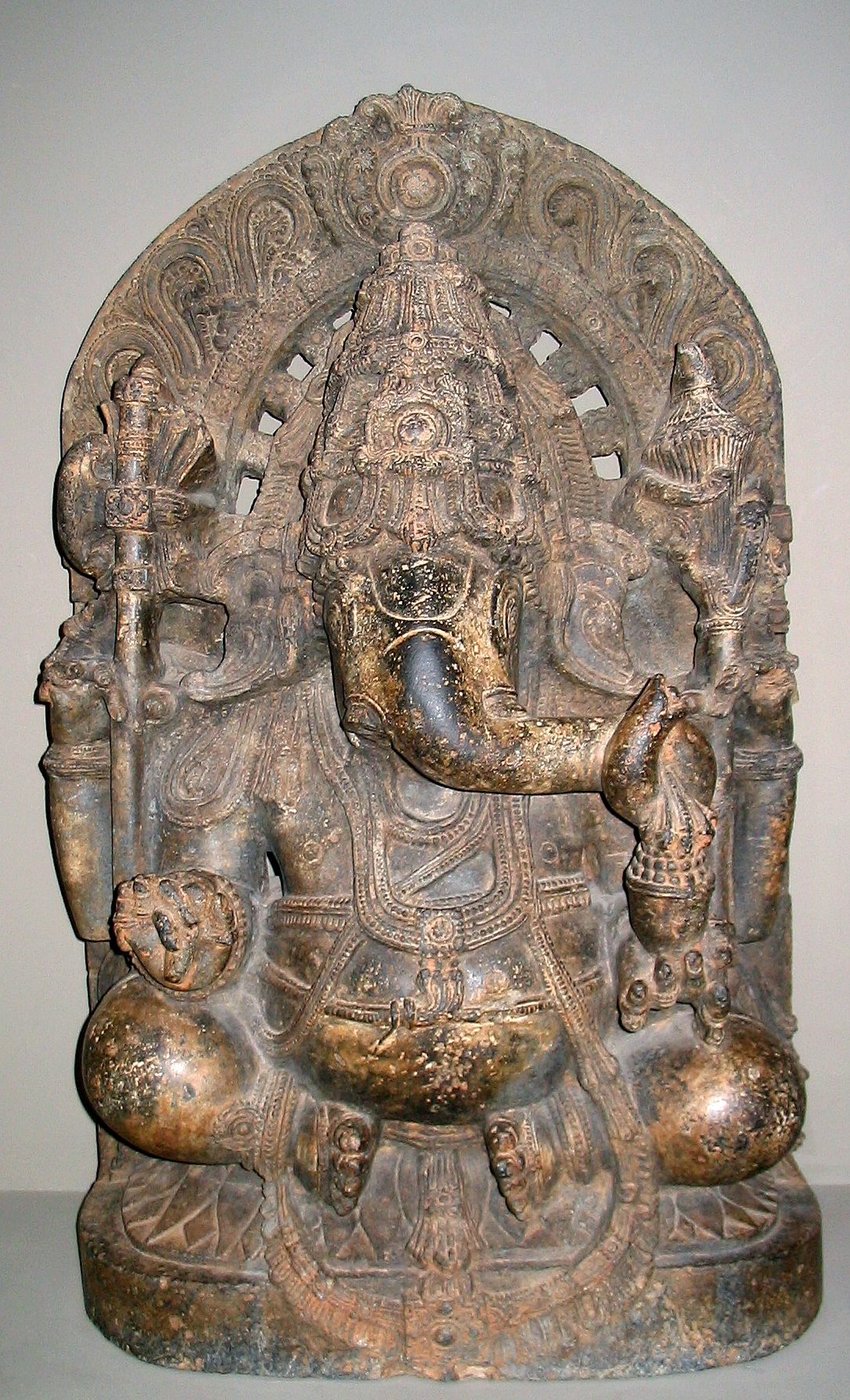
A statue of Ganesha—the elephant-headed Hindu god of wisdom and obstacle removal

In Thailand it is believed that a white elephant may contain the soul of a dead person, perhaps a Buddha. When one is taken the capturer is rewarded and the animal is brought to the king to be kept ever afterward. It cannot be bought or sold. It is baptized and fêted and mourned for like a human being at its death. In some parts of Indochina, the belief is that the soul of the elephant may injure people after death; it is therefore fêted by a whole village. In Cambodia it is held to bring luck to the kingdom. The cult of the white elephant is also found at Ennarea in southern Ethiopia. In India, the popular Hindu god Ganesha has the head of an elephant and a torso of a human.

In Surat, unmarried Anāvil girls participate in a holiday referred to as Alunām. This holiday is to honor the goddess Pārvatī. During this celebration, a clay elephant is prepared (most likely to celebrate Pārvatī's creation of Ganesha from a paste of either turmeric or sandalwood. Every day, unmarried women worship this elephant by dancing, singing songs, and abstaining from eating salt. On the final day of Alunām, the clay elephant is immersed in some body of water.

Certain cultures also used elephant figurines to display the animal's importance. There was evidence of an ancient elephant cult in Sumatra. Stone elephant figurines were built as "seats of the souls" in the Sumatran culture. In North Borneo, however, wooden elephant figurines were placed on the top of a bamboo pole. This bamboo pole was only erected after the tribe chief had collected a certain number of human heads.

== Wild mammals ==
=== Hare ===
In North America, the Algonquian tribes had as their chief deity a "mighty great hare" to whom they went to death. According to one account, he lived in the east, according to another in the north. In his anthropomorphized form he was known as Menabosho or Michabo.

The Ancient Egyptians also worshipped a hare goddess, named Wenut. She was associated with the city of Hermopolis, and her image appears on the standard of the Hermopolitan nome.

=== Deer ===
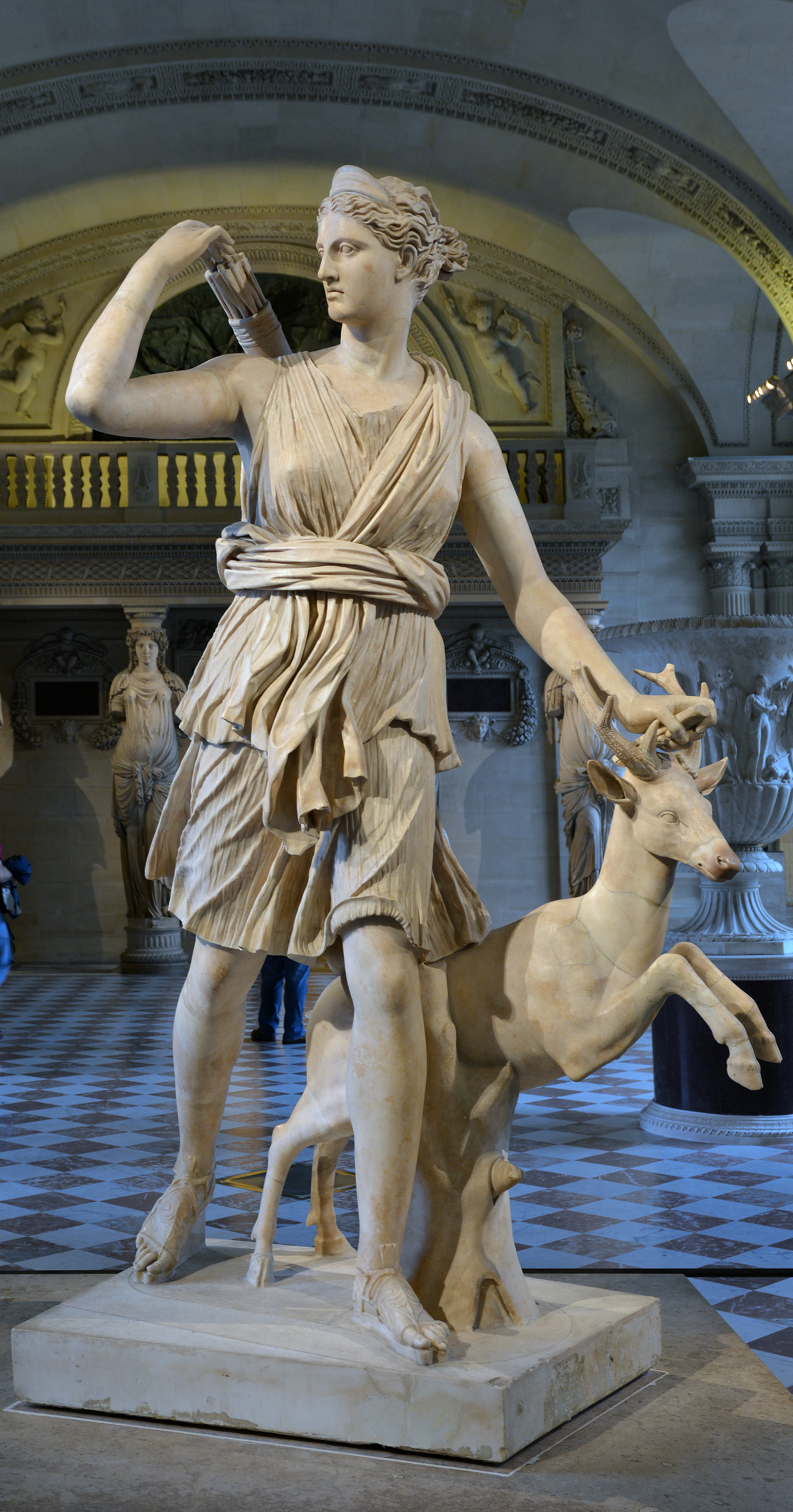
Artemis with a deer, the Diana of Versailles in the Louvre Galerie des Caryatides that was designed for it

The deer is important in the mythology of many peoples. To the Greeks it was sacred to the goddess Artemis, while in Hinduism it is linked to the goddess Saraswati. The deer also held spiritual significance to the pastoralist cultures of the Eurasian Steppe. The golden stag figurine found in the Pazyryk burials is one of the most famous pieces of Scythian art.

=== Wolf ===
In the story of Rome's foundation, wolves are used in totemic imagery. The founding brothers Romulus and Remus are raised by a mother wolf, making the wolf the symbolic mother of Rome.

Among the Ancient Egyptians, the gods Anubis and Wepwawet both took the form of a wolf, jackal or wild dog, or a man with the head of such a creature. Anubis was a funerary deity, considered the patron of the mummification process and a protector of tombs. In the afterlife, it was he who performed the crucial role in the Weighing of the Heart ceremony that decided the individual's post-mortem fate. In earlier times Anubis was the supreme god of the underworld, but he was later replaced in that role by the human-formed Osiris. It is possible that the Egyptians originally conceived of Anubis as a wild dog because of the animal's location on the outskirts of towns, near the tombs of the dead, or possibly because of their scavenging of corpses, which led them to congregate near tombs. Wepwawet was a deity more focussed on the world of the living, whose chief role was to 'open the way', whether this is opening the way of the pharaoh to victory in battle, opening the way for the priests in a ritual procession, or any other application. The great antiquity of Wepwawet's worship in Egypt is evidenced by the Narmer Palette, made by the very first of the dynastic pharaohs, including the image of a wolf on a standard as a part of a ritual procession. It has been suggested that Wepwawet's depiction as a wolf stems from the animal's keen sense of smell, allowing it to 'open the way' to find something important.

=== Fox ===
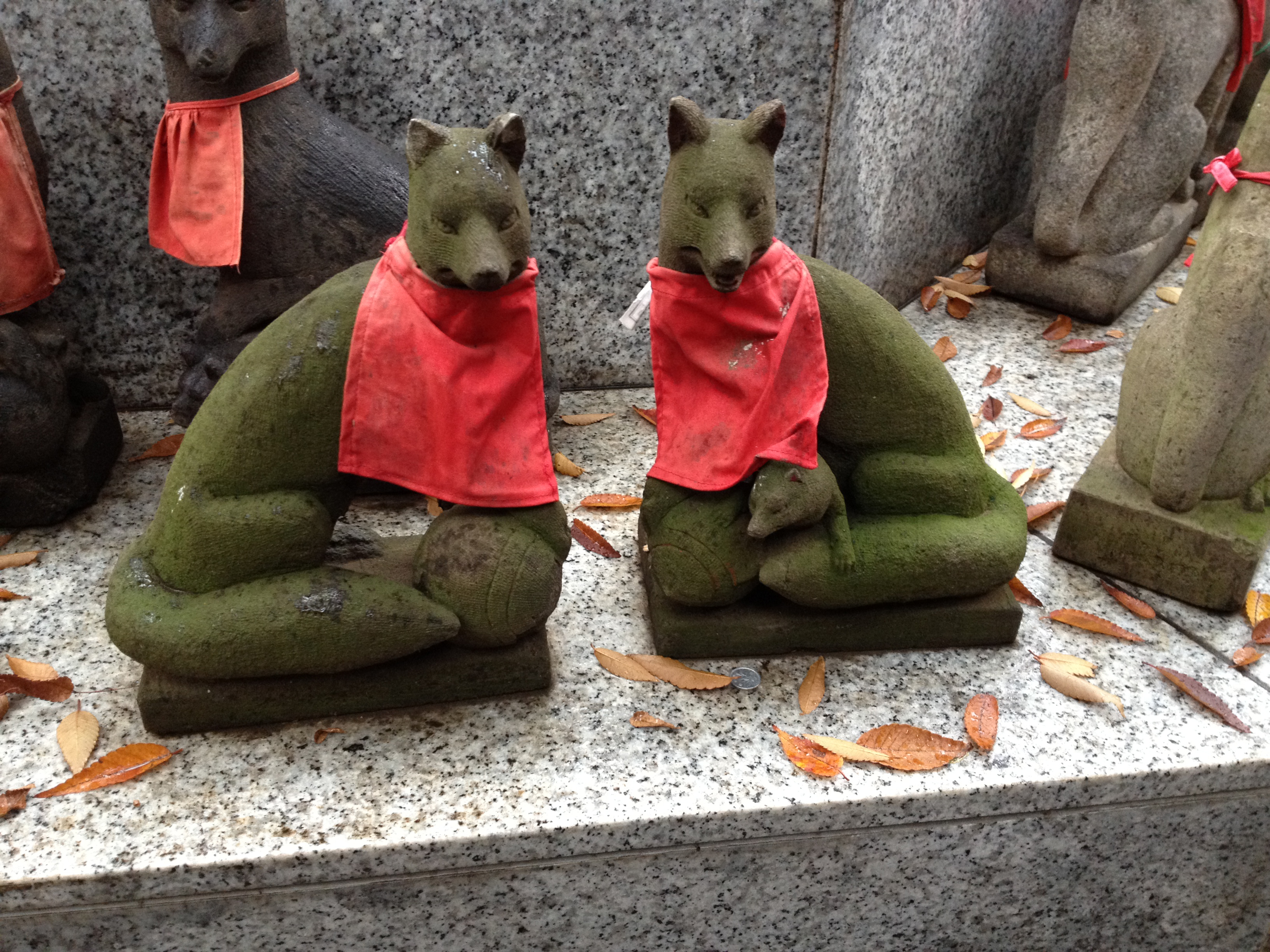
Inari Okami Kitsune (fox) deity

A depiction of a fox spirit

Fox deities appear in Chinese and Japanese mythologies and folklores, and are worshipped as spirits in shrines, such as the Inari shrines.

In Chinese, Japanese, Korean and Vietnamese folklores, foxes (huli jing in China, kitsune in Japan, kumiho in Korea, and hồ ly tinh in Vietnam) are powerful spirits that are known for their highly mischievous and cunning nature, and they often take on the form of female humans to seduce men. In contemporary Chinese, the word huli jing is often used to describe a mistress negatively in an extramarital affair. In Shinto of Japan, kitsune sometimes help people as an errand of their deity, Inari.

Popular fox worship during the Tang dynasty has been mentioned in a text entitled Hu Shen (Fox gods):

Since the beginning of the Tang, many commoners have worshiped fox spirits. They make offerings in their bedchambers to beg for their favor. The foxes share people's food and drink. They do not serve a single master. At the time there was a figure of speech saying, "Where there is no fox demon, no village can be established."

The fox cult survived in northern China in the 20th century, but was suppressed during the anti-superstition Socialist Education Campaign.

=== Big cats ===
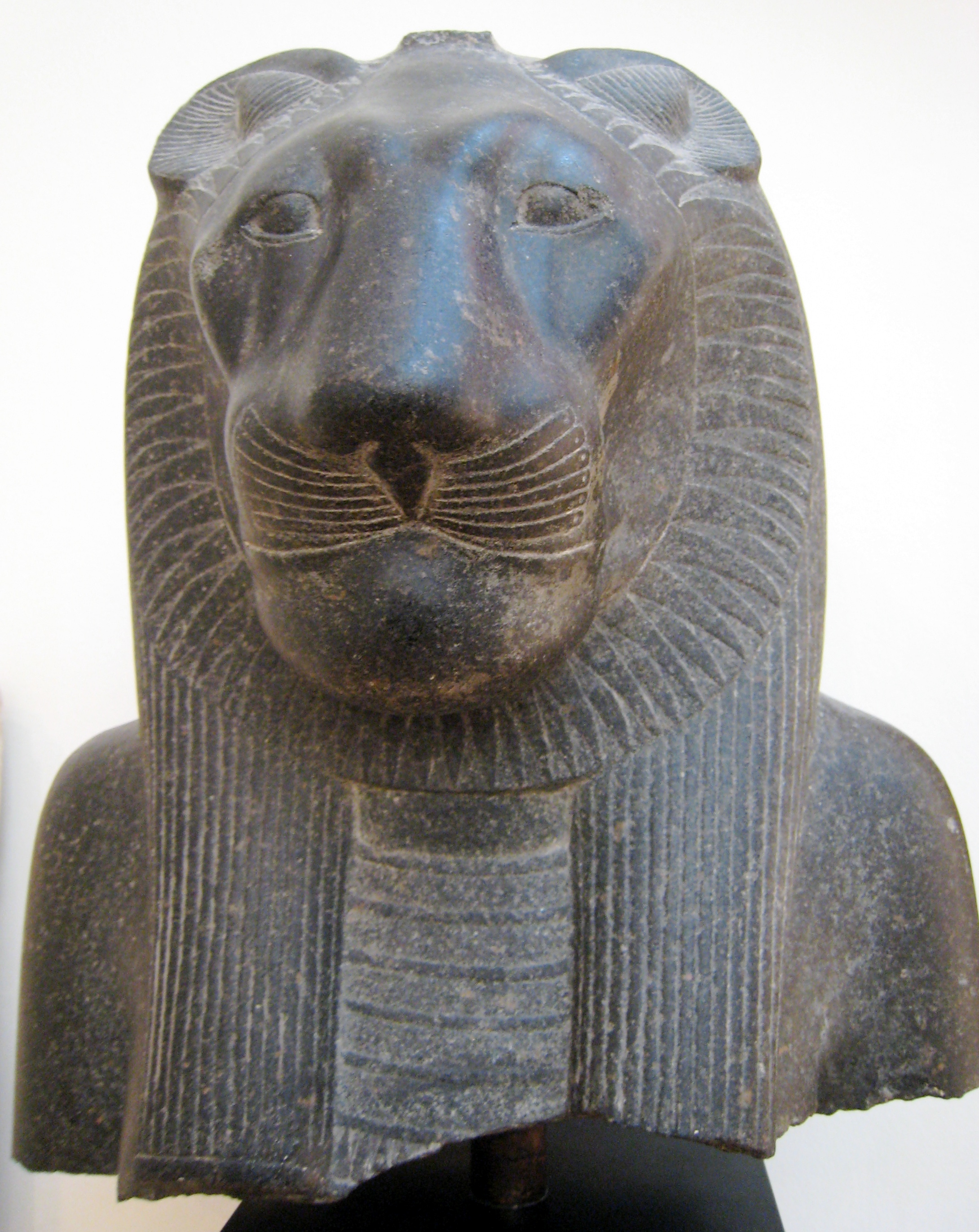
Granite statue of the lion-headed Egyptian deity Sekhmet from the temple of Mut at Luxor, dating to 1403–1365 BC, exhibited in the National Museum of Denmark

The cult of the leopard is widely found in West Africa. Among the Ashanti people a man who kills one is liable to be put to death; no leopard skin may be exposed to view, but a stuffed leopard is worshipped. On the Gold Coast, a leopard hunter who has killed his victim is carried around the town behind the body of the leopard; he may not speak, must besmear himself so as to look like a leopard and imitate its movements. In Loango a prince's cap is put upon the head of a dead leopard, and dances are held in its honour.

In Ancient Egypt, there were several feline-shaped deities. The earliest attested of these was the goddess Mafdet. During the First Dynasty 2920–2770 BC, Mafdet was regarded as the protector of the Pharaoh's chambers against snakes, scorpions and other evil. She was often depicted with the head of a cheetah, leopard or lynx. In later periods, other feline deities were more dominant. There were several lion-headed deities, included goddesses such as Sekhmet, Tefnut, Bastet (early form), Pakhet, Mehit and Menhit, and gods such as Maahes. All of these were fierce deities, dedicated to destroying the enemies of the gods and the pharaoh. Sekhmet, the most famous Egyptian lion-goddess, was considered a daughter of the chief god Ra and was worshipped as a beneficent goddess who protected Egypt from pestilence and misfortune, though at the same time was greatly feared due to her destructive capabilities, as demonstrated in the Book of the Heavenly Cow. Bastet, formerly called Bast, was originally worshipped as a fierce lioness, though in later times was 'tamed' and worshipped as a gentler domestic cat. During the Late Period of ancient Egypt from 664 BC until the 4th century AD, the practice of mummifying small cats in Bastet's honour grew in popularity. Cat mummies were used as votive offerings to the goddess, mostly during festivals and by pilgrims. Hundreds of thousands of cat mummies were excavated at cat cemeteries in Bubastis, Saqqara, Speos Artemidos and Gizeh.

There was a lion god at Baalbek. The pre-Islamic Arabs worshipped the lion god Yaghuth. In modern Africa there is a lion-idol among the Balondo. The lion was also sacred to Hebat, the mother goddess of the Hurrians.

In Judaism the patriarch Jacob refers to his son Judah as a Gur Aryeh גּוּר אַרְיֵה יְהוּדָה, a "Young Lion" (Genesis 49:9) when blessing him. Thus the Lion of Judah started to be reverenced in some other Abrahamic cults, symbolising their prophets, such as Jesus and Haile Selassie I, the ras Tafari.

In Mesoamerica the jaguar was revered as a symbol of fertility and warriorship among the Aztec, Maya and Olmec, and had an important role in shamanism.

=== Tiger ===
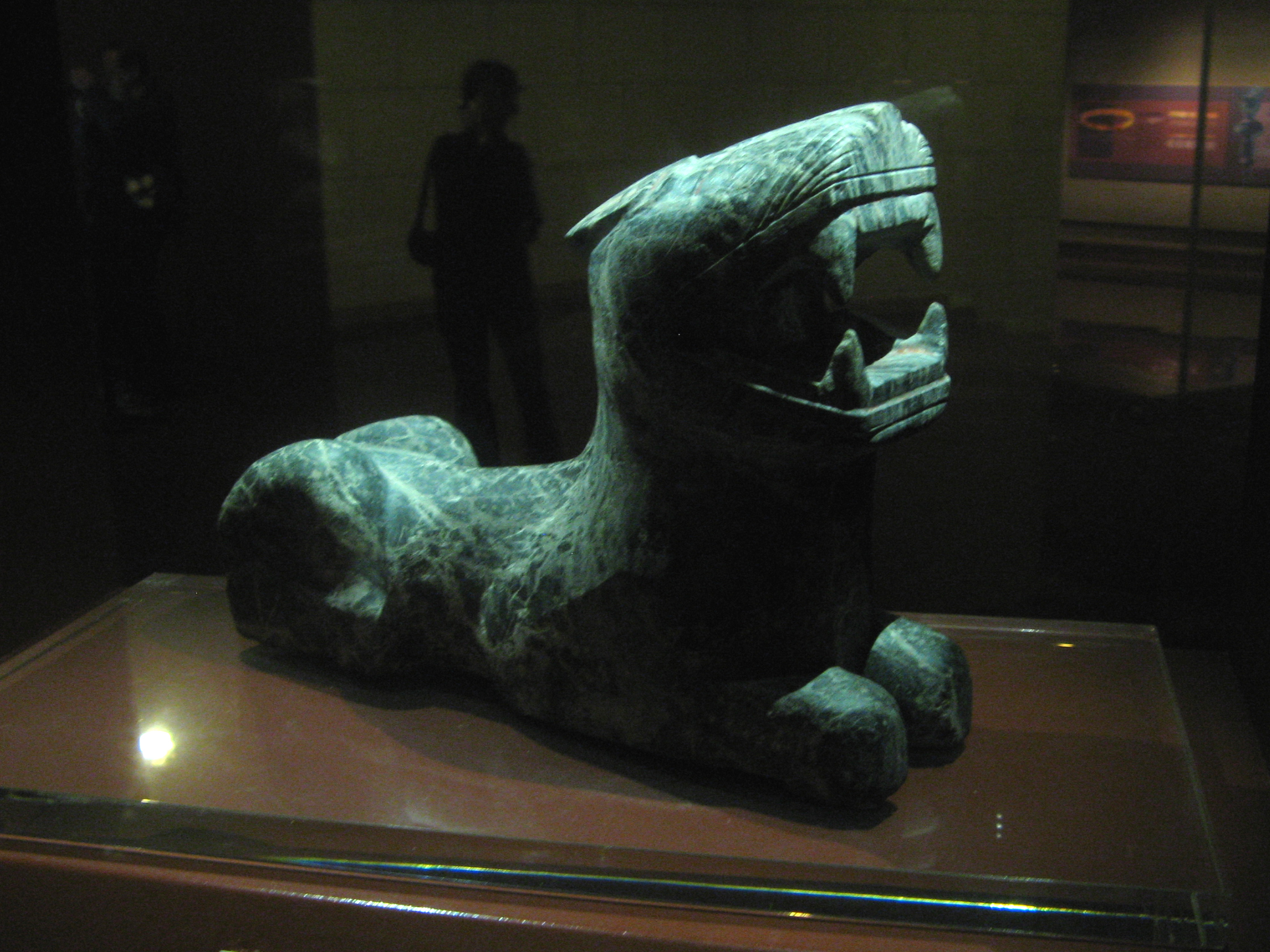
A stone tiger from the ritual area of the Shu Jinsha site. (1st mill. BC)

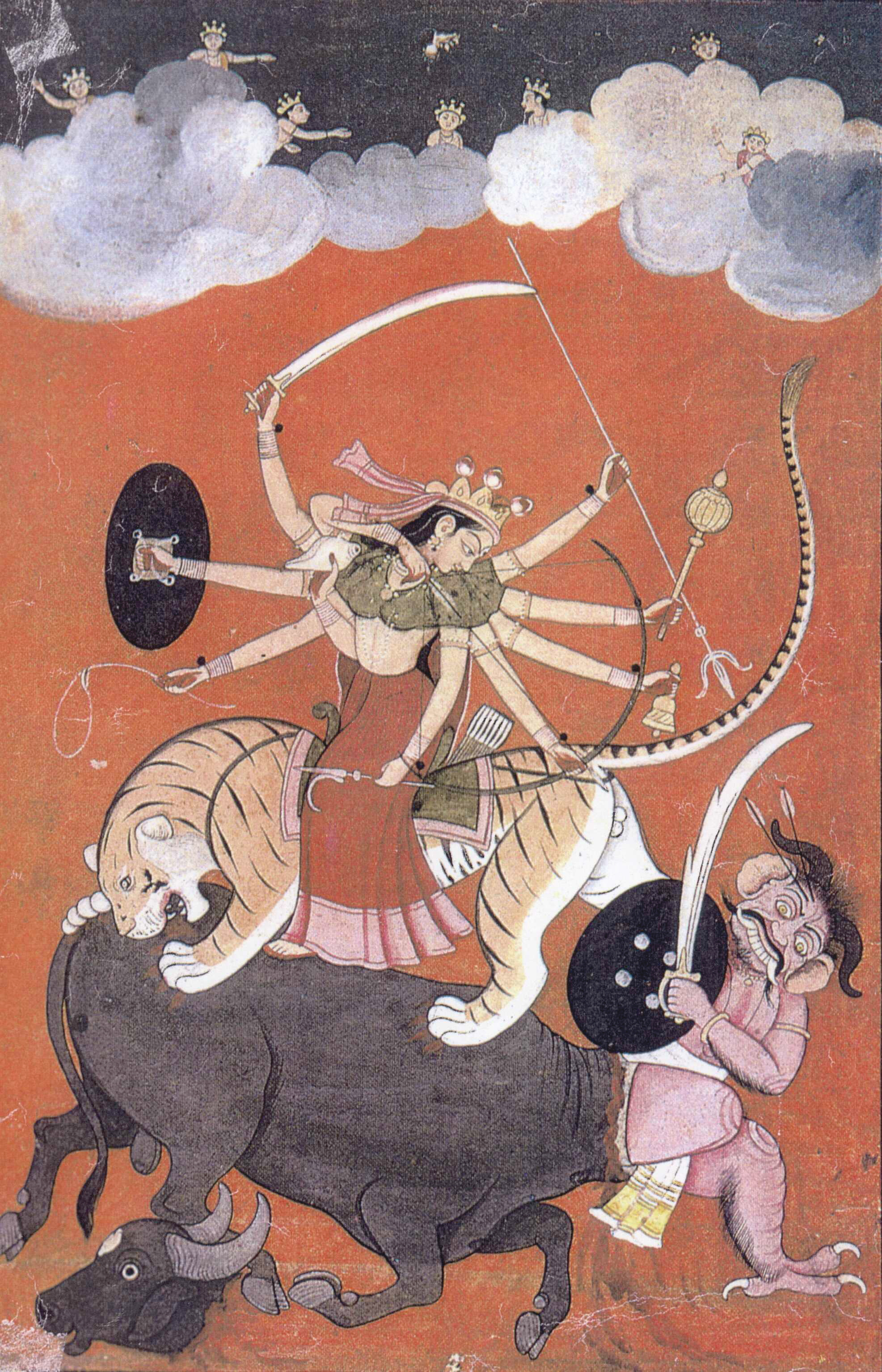
The Hindu goddess Durga riding a tiger. (Guler School, early 18th cent.)

Of great importance in Chinese myth and culture, the tiger has been considered a major symbol of masculine yang energy since the earliest surviving records of Chinese history. In modern China, it is thought to represent nobility, fearlessness, and wrath and to be the king of the animals, with stripes over its forehead frequently redrawn to form the character for king (王). The tiger was originally paired and contrasted with the dragon in Chinese myth, literature, art, and martial arts to represent the yin-yang as well as the dualities of earth and water, west and east, matter and spirit, although by the late imperial era the dragon was instead taken to represent yang and paired with the phoenix as the symbol of feminine yin instead. The White Tiger is one of the four cardinal symbols of Chinese astrology and traditional astronomy, representing autumn and the west and an important figure in Taoism and Chinese folk religion. Separately, the Year of the Tiger is the 3rd year of the duodecennial Chinese zodiac, based on the stars in opposition to the Jovian cycle.

Tigers were either worshipped directly or used as a symbols of aspects of the divine in Shu and other ancient Chinese states, as well as the Black Pottery culture and among the Tungus. The Han sometimes depicted Xiwangmu, the Queen Mother of the West, with the tail of a tiger and once wore stone representations of tigers as protective amulets. Even today, some celebrants of the Dragon Boat Festival paint the character 王 on children's foreheads with arsenic realgar as a protective ward against snakebite and other summer ailments. Some tiger worship still occurs, primarily as a form of minority cultural tourism. The Solar Calendar Square is a tourist site in Kunming, Yunnan, related to the traditional religion of the Yi people which held that a tiger was responsible for the creation of the world. It includes a growling tiger statue 5 meters (16 ft) high. A similar attraction with an Yi tiger totem is located in Chuxiong, Yunnan. The towns of Shuangbai County in Chuxiong Prefecture preserve a traditional dance that originated in rituals related to tiger worship. Continued worship of tigers also occurs in Manchurian folk religion.

In Korean history and culture, a tiger is regarded as a guardian that drives away evil spirits and a sacred creature that brings good luck—the symbol of courage and absolute power. It appears not only in the Korean foundation mythology but also in folklore, as well as being a favorite subject of Korean art. For example, the 19th-century painting named "Sansindo" (산신도) depicts the guardian spirit of a mountain leaning against a tiger or riding on the back of the animal. The animal is also known to do errands for the mountain's guardian spirit which is known to wish for peace and the well-being of the village. So, the tiger was ordered by the spiritual guardian of the mountain to give protection and wish for peace in the village. People drew such paintings and hung them in the shrine built on the mountain of the village where memorial rituals were performed regularly. In Buddhism, there is also a shrine that keeps the painting of the guardian spirit of the mountain. Called "Sansintaenghwa" (산신탱화, 山神幀畵), it is a depiction of the guardian spirit of the mountain and a tiger.

In many parts of Vietnam, the tiger is a revered creature with many villages having a tiger temple. This Vietnamese folk religion might have stem from the fear of tigers used to raid human settlements in ancient times. Tigers are admired for their great strength, ferocity, and grace. The tiger is also considered a guardian deity. Tiger statutes are also seen at the entrance of temples and palaces, keeping evil spirits from entering those places.

The tiger is associated with the Hindu deities Shiva and Durga. In Pokhara, Nepal, the tiger festival is known as Bagh Jatra. Celebrants dance disguised as tigers and are "hunted". The Warli of western India worship the tiger-like god Waghoba. The Warli believe that shrines and sacrifices to the deity will lead to better coexistence with the local big cats, both tigers and leopards, and that Waghoba will protect them when they enter the forests.

=== Monkey ===
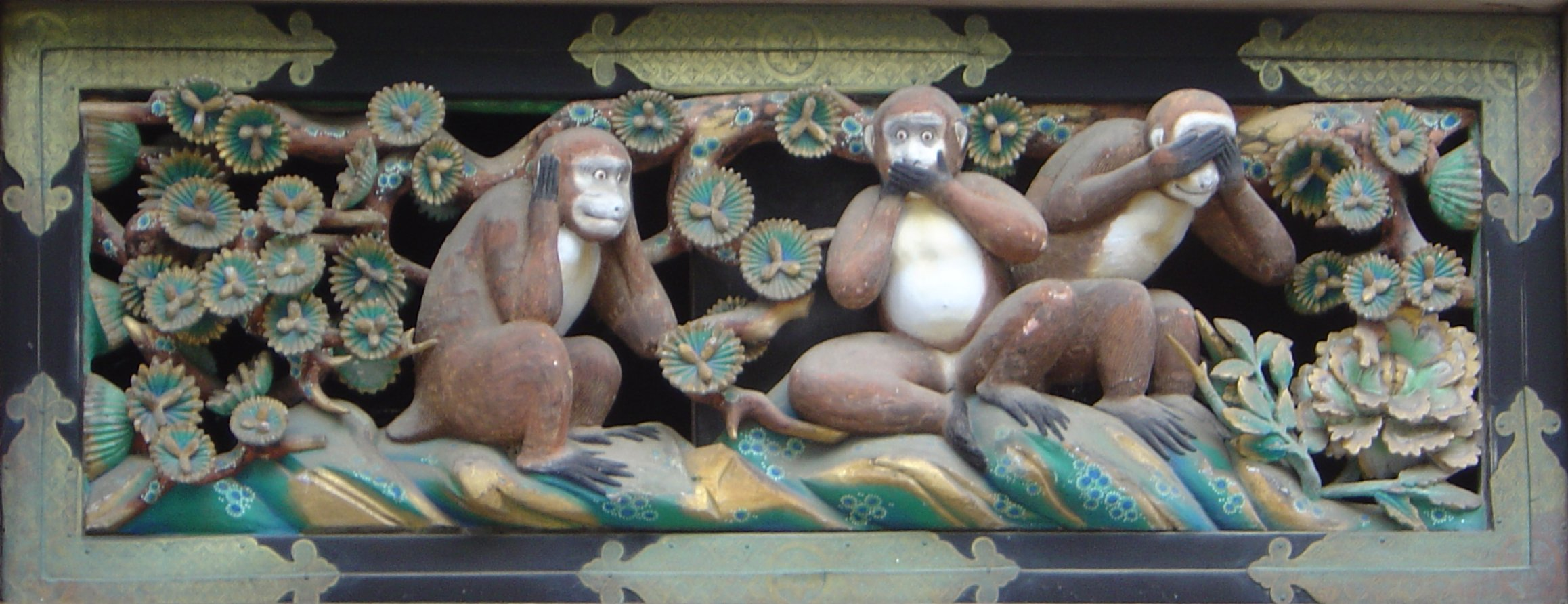
The three wise monkeys over the Tōshō-gū shrine in Nikkō, Japan

In Hinduism, the monkey deity, Hanuman, is a prominent figure. He is a reincarnation of Shiva, the god of destruction. In orthodox villages monkeys are safe from harm.

Chinese religions and mythologies give monkeys and apes cultural significance as metaphors for people. Chinese deities sometimes appear in the guise of monkeys, for example, Sun Wukong or "Monkey King" is the main protagonist in Wu Cheng'en's picaresque novel Journey to the West. In traditional Chinese folk religion, monkeys are supernatural beings that could shape shift into either monkey-demons or were-monkeys, and legends about monkey-human interbreeding are common. In Daoism, monkeys, particularly gibbons, were believed to have longevity like a xian "transcendent; immortal", and to be innately adept at circulating and absorbing qi "breath; life force" through the Daoist discipline of daoyin "guiding and pulling". Similar to Daoism, Chinese Buddhism paradoxically treats monkeys as both wise and foolish animals. On the one hand, the Jataka tales say that Gautama Buddha was a benevolent monkey king in an earlier incarnation; and on the other hand, monkeys symbolized trickery and ignorance, represented by the Chan Buddhist "mind monkey" metaphor for the unsettled, restless nature of human mentality.

Monkeys are said to be worshipped in Togo. At Porto-Novo in Benin, twins have tutelary spirits in the shape of small monkeys.

The hamadryas baboon was sacred to the Ancient Egyptians and often appeared as a form of a deity. Egyptian deities depicted as baboons include Hapi (Son of Horus), Babi (mythology) and Thoth, although the latter is more often shown with the head of an ibis. A group of 6 or 8 baboons was also a common feature in scenes depicting the sun god at dawn as he rose over the horizon, with the baboons raising their hands to him in praise. This is probably inspired by the observed behaviour of baboons, as they are known to 'chatter' at sunrise as if greeting the sun.

=== Hippopotamus ===
In Ancient Egyptian religion, the hippopotamus had both positive and negative associations. On the one hand, the strong maternal instinct of female hippos led to the worship of several female hippo goddesses, usually as goddesses of pregnancy and motherhood, and protectors of women and children. The most famous of these hippopotamus goddesses is Taweret, a very common household deity among the common people of Egypt, and many amulets were made in her form. Others included Opet or Ipet, who was similar to Taweret but a little more stately, as well as Reret, who personified the constellation of Draco. On the other hand, the destructive capabilities of the hippopotamus towards useful boats led to it also being seen as a force of chaos, and so it also became associated with the god of disorder, Set. Though normally depicted as a man with the head of the mysterious "sha" animal, in scenes of the battles between Seth and Horus, Seth can sometimes be shown in hippopotamus form, with Horus standing on a papyrus raft and spearing him with a harpoon. This victory of Horus over Seth was symbolically re-enacted during royal hunting expeditions, with the king taking the role of Horus, and a wild hippopotamus embodying Seth. The king's successful slaughter of the hippopotamus thus connected his martial prowess to that of Horus himself, demonstrating his right to be king.

=== Rodent ===
In some countries, such as India, a small number of temples are dedicated to the worship of wild mice. Whilst widely regarded as a creature to be avoided, for pestilential reasons in such temples the animals are actively encouraged. It is frequently associated with Ganesh. As a creature capable of survival, it is to be revered and respected.

== Birds ==
=== Crow/raven ===
The Raven is the chief deity of the Tlingit people of Alaska. All over that region it is the chief figure in a group of myths, fulfilling the office of a cultural hero who brings the light, gives fire to mankind, and so on. A raven story from the Puget Sound region describes the "Raven" as having originally lived in the land of spirits (literally bird land) that existed before the world of humans. One day the Raven became so bored with bird land that he flew away, carrying a stone in his beak. When the Raven became tired of carrying the stone and dropped it, the stone fell into the ocean and expanded until it formed the firmament on which humans now live.

In the creator role, and in the Raven's role as the totem and ancestor of one of the four northwest clan houses, the Raven is often addressed as Grandfather Raven. It is not clear whether this form of address is intended to refer to a creator Raven who is different from the trickster Raven, or if it is just a vain attempt to encourage the trickster spirit to act respectably.

Together with the eagle hawk the crow plays a great part in the mythology of southeastern Australia. Ravens also play a part in some European mythologies, such as in the Celtic and Germanic Religions, where they were connected to Bran and the Morrigan in the former and Woden in the latter.

=== Hawk ===
North Borneo treated the hawk as a god, but it was technically the messenger of the people's Supreme God. There were rituals that involved the hawk when the natives wished to make decisions about certain events, such as journeys from home, major agricultural work, and war. In North Borneo we seem to see the evolution of a god in the three stages of the cult of the hawk among the Kenyahs, the Kayans, and the sea Dyaks. The Kenyahs will not kill it, address to it thanks for assistance, and formally consult it before leaving home on an expedition. It seems, however, to be regarded as the messenger of the supreme god Balli Penyalong. The Kayans have a hawk god, Laki Neho, but seem to regard the hawk as the servant of the chief god, Laki Tenangan. Singalang Burong, the hawk-god of the Dyaks, is completely anthropomorphized. He is the god of omens and ruler of the omen birds, but the hawk is not his messenger for he never leaves his house. Stories are, however, told of his attending feasts in human form and flying away in hawk form when all was over.

According to Florance Waterbury, hawk worship was universal. This particular bird was "a heavenly deity; its wings were the sky, the sun and moon were its eyes".

The hawk is commonly associated with the Egyptian god Horus. As a god of the sky, divine authority, war, victory, and civilisation, Horus became the patron deity of the pharaohs. The souls of former pharaohs were said to be the followers of Horus and therefore, the hawk. Horus was originally depicted by the Egyptians as a full hawk, but after the Fourth and Fifth Dynasty depictions with a human body and a hawk head became more common. Other Egyptian deities shown in the form of a hawk or hawk-headed man include Qebehsenuef, Sopdu, Ra (not always), and Sokar.

Egypt was not the only location of hawk worshippers. There were several other cultures that held the hawk in high regard. The hawk was a deity on the island of Hawaii and symbolized swift justice. Along with the lone island from the Hawaiian archipelago, the Fiji islands also had some tribes who worshipped a hawk god. Furthermore, although animal worshipping is not a part of Sikh culture, a white falcon bird is primarily regarded in Sikhism as it was associated with the sixth guru and especially the tenth guru. The tenth guru would always carry a white falcon perched on his hand when going out to hunt. The tenth guru was known as the Master of White Hawk. Many people believe that the bird carried by Guru Gobind Singh was a hawk, however, historians believe that the bird was a gyrfalcon or a saker falcon.

=== Frigatebird ===
On Easter Island until the 1860s there was a Tangata manu (Bird man) cult which has left behind paintings and petroglyphs of Birdmen (half men half frigatebirds). The cult involved an annual race to collect the first sooty tern egg of the season from the islet of Moto Iti and take it to Orongo.

The Frigate Bird Cult is thought to have originated in the Solomon Islands before immigrating to Easter Island where it became obsolete. The Frigate-Bird was a representation of the god Make-make, the god of the seabird's egg on Easter Island.

=== Ibis ===
In Ancient Egypt, the ibis was considered sacred as it was viewed as a manifestation of Thoth, a god of the moon and wisdom. In art, Thoth was usually depicted as a man with the head of an ibis, or more rarely as a baboon. Sacred ibises were kept and fed in temples in his honour, and mummified ibises were given to him as votive offerings. It is thought that the association of the ibis with Thoth may have originated from the curved shape of the bird's beak, which resembles a crescent moon.

=== Vulture ===
Another species of bird that was considered sacred in Ancient Egypt was the Egyptian vulture. At the city of Nekheb in Upper Egypt there was a temple dedicated to the goddess Nekhbet, who was depicted in art as a vulture, sometimes wearing a royal crown. Nekhbet was closely associated with the Egyptian royal family and was considered a personal protector of the Egyptian king. She was often portrayed or invoked alongside a similar goddess named Wadjet, who was depicted as a cobra and had her main temple at Buto in Lower Egypt. Nekhbet and Wadjet thus often featured together on temple reliefs and stelae, representing in heraldic format the union between Upper and Lower Egypt. These two goddesses were considered so important that they could be referred to by the simple title "nebty" ("the two ladies") without any confusion as to their identity. Out of the five names that made up the Ancient Egyptian royal titulary, one of them, the "nebty name" was dedicated to the Two Ladies. This great honour of patronage over one of the king's names was shared only with such major gods as Ra and Horus. Egyptologists have theorised that the association of Nekhbet with the vulture may have originated from observations of a mother vulture's behaviour as it protects its chicks by "mantling" them with its wings, leading to its association with a protective and maternal goddess. In fact, the Egyptian word "mut" ("mother") is spelt in hieroglyphs with a picture of a vulture. Due to the vulture's maternal connotations and its early use in the iconography of Nekhbet, in later periods a vulture headdress came to be worn by a large number of Egyptian goddesses, as well as by human queens. The goddess Mut, worshipped at Thebes, Egypt alongside Amun and Khonsu, was written in hieroglyphs with a picture of a vulture, and would be indistinguishable from the common noun "mother" except for the fact that in the goddess's name the vulture bears a royal flail. Goddesses who wore the vulture headdress in later periods included Mut, Hathor, Isis, and Wadjet, although only Nekhbet appeared as a vulture in its entirety.

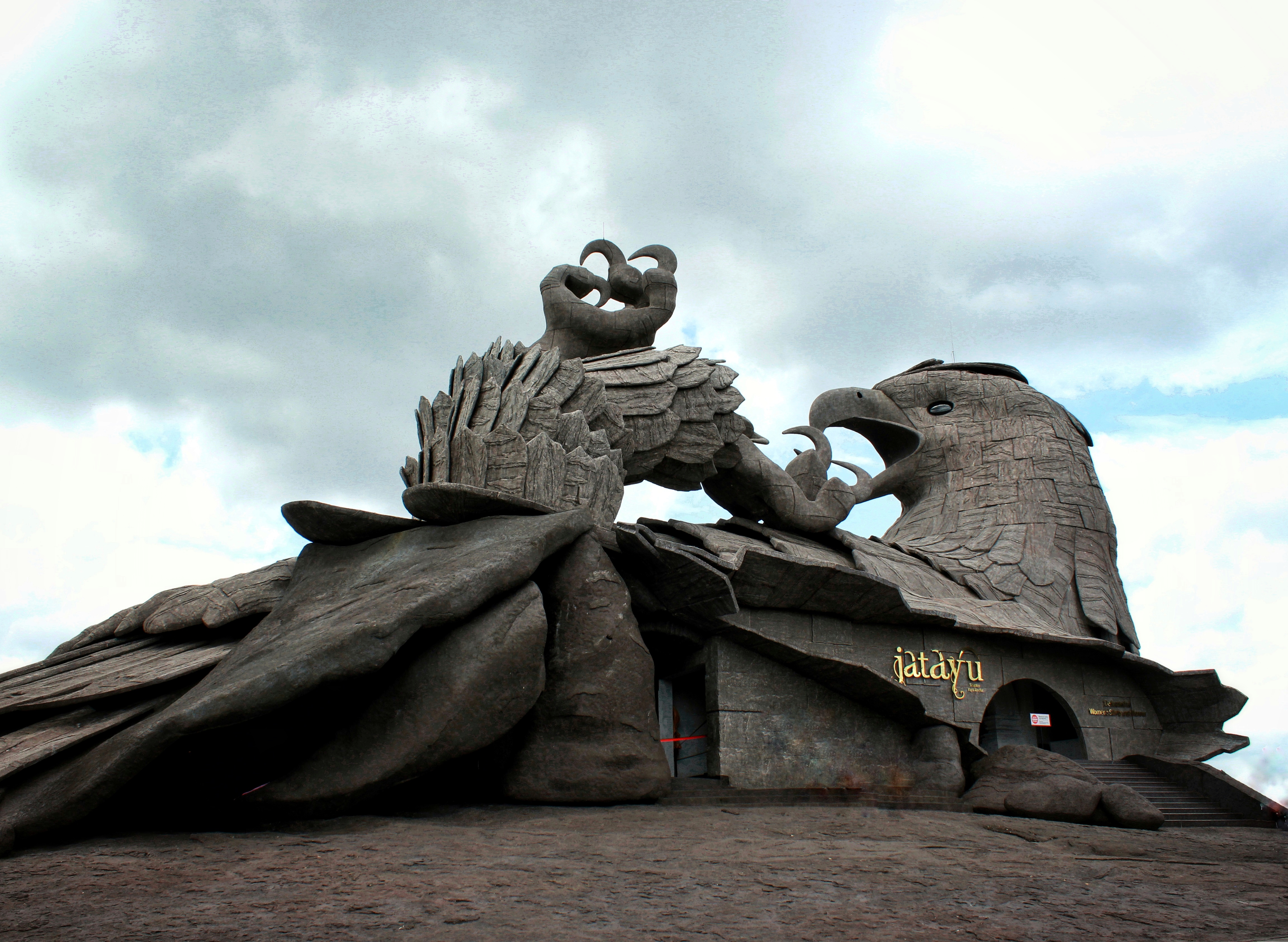
Jaṭayu sculpture at Jaṭāyū Nature Park, credited as the world's largest bird sculpture.

In the Hindu epic Ramayana, Jatayu, the "King of Vultures"(gṛdhrarāja), fights valiantly with the rakshasa Ravana to prevent him from abducting Sita. However, as Jatayu was very old, Ravana soon defeated him, clipping his wings, and Jatayu descended upon the earth. Rama and Lakshmana, while searching for Sita, chanced upon the stricken and dying Jatayu, who informed them of the battle with Ravana, and told them that Ravana had headed south. Jatayu then died of his wounds and Rama performed his final funeral rites. Jatayu's elder brother Sampati later helps Rama and Lakshmana find Sita.

Jatayu is worshipped at the Vijayaraghava Perumal temple (Thiruputkuli, Tamil Nadu), which is believed to be the site where he fell.

== Other non-mammals ==
=== Serpents ===
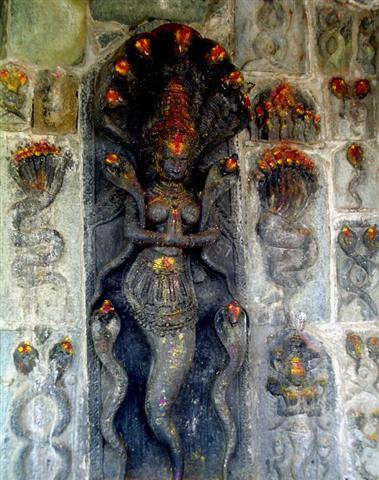
The altar where serpent deities are worshipped in a temple in Belur, Karnataka, India

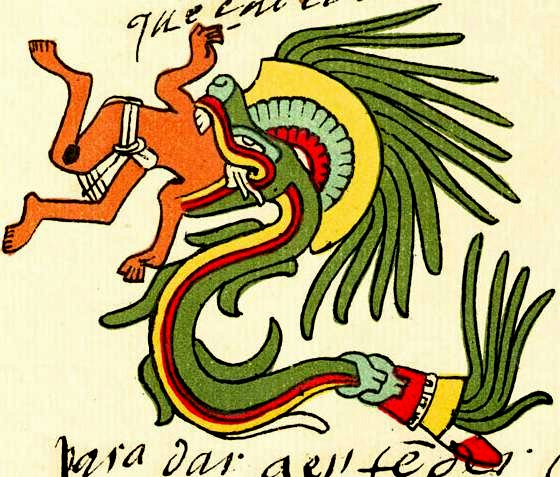
Quetzalcoatl depicted as a snake devouring a man, from the Codex Telleriano-Remensis.

The worship of the serpent is found in many parts of the Old World, and in the Americas.

In India snake worship refers to the high status of snakes in Hindu mythology. Over a large part of India, there are carved representations of cobras (nagas) or stones as substitutes. To these people, food and flowers are offered and lights are burned before the shrines. Among the Dravidians a cobra that is accidentally killed is burned like a human being; no one would kill one intentionally. The serpent god's image is carried in an annual procession by a celibate priestess.

At one time there were many prevalent different renditions of the serpent cult located in India. In Northern India, a masculine version of the serpent named Nagaraja, known as the "king of the serpents" was worshipped. Instead of the "king of the serpents," actual live snakes were worshipped in South India. The Manasa cult in Bengal, India, however, was dedicated to the anthropomorphic serpent goddess, Manasa.

In Africa the chief centre of serpent worship was Dahomey. But the cult of the python seems to have been of exotic origin, dating back to the first quarter of the 17th century. By the conquest of Whydah, the Dahomeyans were brought in contact with a people of serpent worshippers and ended by adopting from them the beliefs which they at first despised. At Whydah, the chief centre, there is a serpent temple, tenanted by some fifty snakes. Every python of the danh-gbi kind must be treated with respect, and death is the penalty for killing one, even by accident. Danh-gbi has numerous wives, who until 1857 took part in a public procession from which the profane crowd was excluded; a python was carried around the town in a hammock, perhaps as a ceremony for the expulsion of evils. The rainbow god of the Ashanti was also conceived to have the form of a snake. His messenger was said to be a small variety of boa. But only specific individuals, not the whole species, were sacred. In many parts of Africa, the serpent is looked upon as the incarnation of deceased relatives. Among the Amazulu, as among the Betsileo of Madagascar, certain species are assigned as the abode of certain classes. The Maasai, on the other hand, regard each species as the habitat of a particular family of the tribe.

In Ancient Egyptian religion, serpents had both positive and negative representations. On the one hand, the Egyptians worshipped several beneficent snake deities, including Wadjet, Renenutet, Meretseger, Nehebkau and Mehen. The uraeus was a fierce divine cobra that protected Egyptian kings and major deities. On the other hand, the serpent Apophis was a malevolent demon, who endeavoured to destroy the chief deity Ra.

The Sumerians had a serpent god Ningizzida.

=== Crocodiles ===
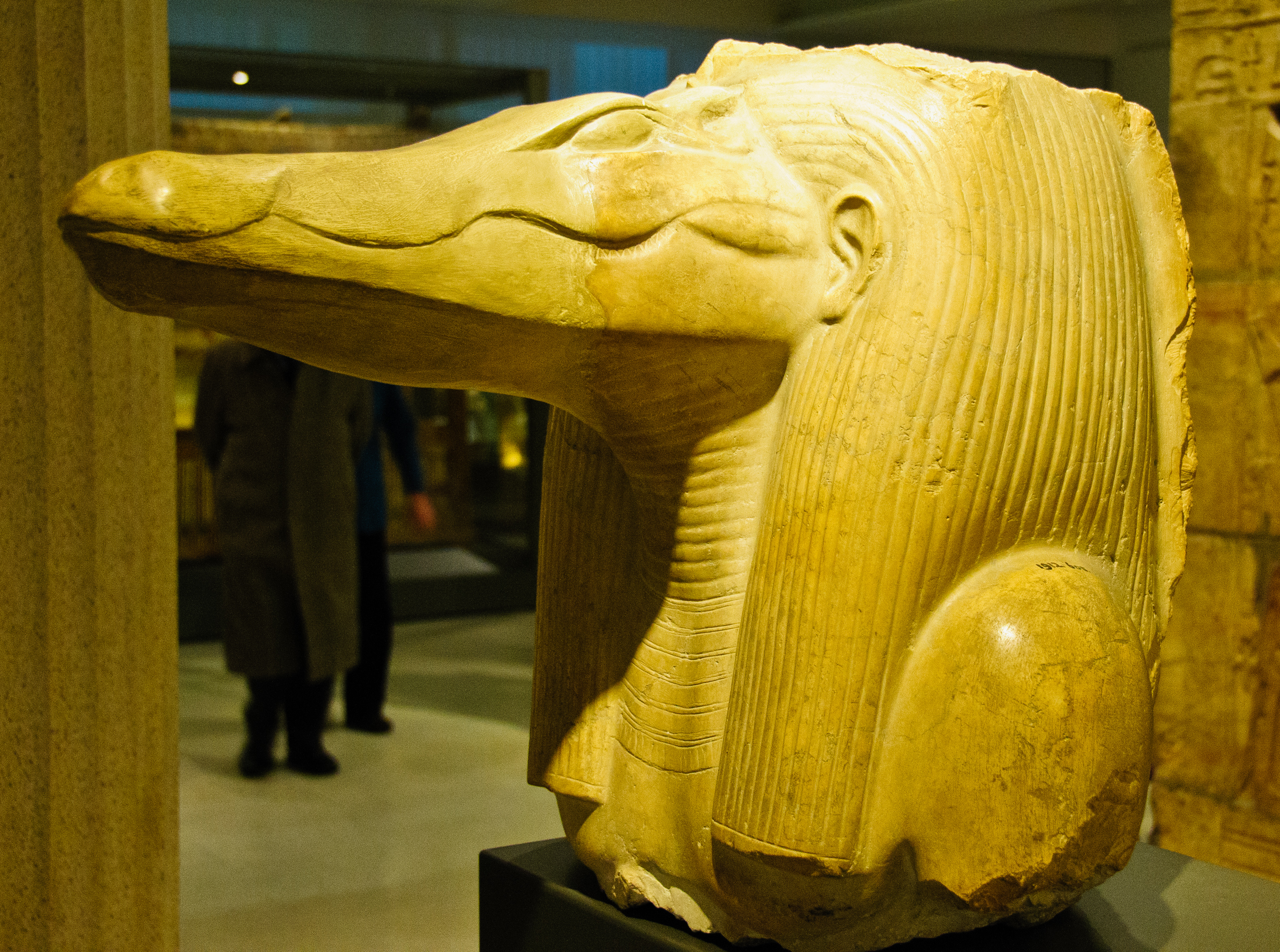
Statue of the ancient Egyptian god Sobek from the mortuary temple of Amenemhat III c. 1810 BC. Ashmolean Museum, Oxford.

As well as the serpent, the Nile crocodile was another important reptile in ancient Egyptian religion. Several deities were depicted in crocodilian form, but the most famous and important of these was undoubtedly the god Sobek. Sobek was a powerful and fearsome god, associated with violence and strength, and acted as a fierce protector against evil, and a punisher of wrongdoers. It is easy to see why he was associated with the crocodile, which similarly is a very fearsome creature. Sobek also had a role relating to fertility, particularly the fertility brought to the land by the Nile flood, in whose waters crocodiles live. Sobek's main temple was located in the city of Crocodilopolis in the Fayyum area, and he also had the important Temple of Kom Ombo, which he shared with the god Horus. Sobek was also worshipped as a secondary deity in the temples of other gods, particularly those of his mother, the goddess Neith. Other Egyptian crocodile gods include Shemanefer, the lesser-known brother of Sobek, as well as Khenti-kheti and Wenty, about whom little is known.

=== Fish ===
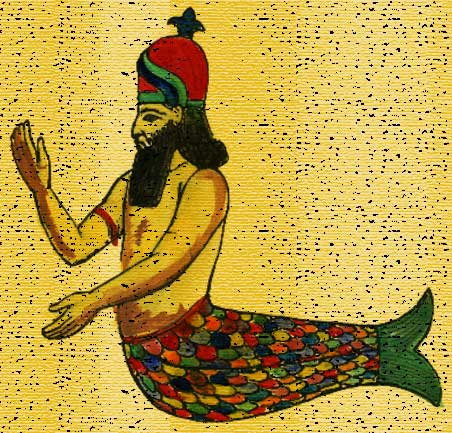
A modern interpretation of Dagon as a "fish-god"

According to the Jewish scholar Rashi, the Canaanite god Dagon was a fish god. This tradition may have originated here, with a misinterpretation, but recently uncovered reliefs suggest a fish-god with human head and hands was worshipped by people who wore fish-skins.

In Japan, there was a deity called Ebisu-gami who, according to Sakurada Katsunori, was widely revered by fishing communities and industries. Ebisu, in later traditions, normally appeared in the form of a fisherman holding a fishing pole and carrying a red tai (a perch), but would sometimes take the form of a whale, shark, human corpse, or rock. The general image of Ebisu, however, appears to be the whale or the shark, according to Sakurada.

During Ebisu-gami festivals, there have been legends told of strange fish creatures which have arrived and been considered sacred. Examples of such fish creatures include familiar species of fish with multiple tails. Sometimes these fish were considered to be simply an offering to the deity. Other times, however, they were considered to be Ebisu himself, visiting on the festival day. Large marine megafaunas such as whales and whale sharks (also called "Ebisu-shark") were often referred to as Ebisu himself to bring a mass of fish among them and as guardians of fishermen.

The Ancient Egyptian goddess Hatmehit from the city of Mendes was depicted as a fish, fish-woman hybrid, or a woman with a fish emblem or crown on her head. She was a goddess of life and protection. Fish, specifically Nile perch, were also held sacred to the Egyptian goddess Neith at her temple at Esna, though she was never depicted in their form.

=== Amphibians ===
The Ancient Egyptians worshipped a goddess in the form of a frog, named Heqet. She was a goddess of fertility, both the fertility of the land and the fertility of human reproduction. She was particularly associated with the final stages of the Nile flood, as well as the final stages of human birth. She was portrayed as a divine midwife and was considered the consort of the god Khnum due to their similar roles.

=== Insects ===
The dung beetle, or scarab, was an important symbol in Ancient Egyptian religion. The behaviour of the beetle rolling its ball of dung along the ground was likened to the sun god rolling the sun across the sky. As a result, the beetle god Khepri received worship in the city of Heliopolis, the main sanctuary of the sun god Ra. In addition, the birth of young beetles from eggs laid in dung was an important symbol of rebirth, so amulets in the shape of scarabs were often included in tombs.

Another insect (technically, an arachnid) venerated by the Egyptians was the scorpion. The goddess Serqet was depicted wearing a scorpion on her headdress, and was prayed to in order to heal venomous stings and bites. She was one of a group of four goddesses frequently invoked together to protect the body in funerary customs, the others being Isis, Nephthys, and Neith. The four were often charged with protecting particular organs, assisting the Four Sons of Horus. Though less famous than the other three canopic goddesses, Serqet's worship is clearly very ancient, with images of scorpions appearing very early in Egyptian art, and even appearing in the names of several early kings. Though the association of Serqet with the scorpion has long been assumed her original function, recent scholarship has questioned whether the original animal in her headdress may have actually been a water scorpion and whether the association with the land scorpion came later. As well as Serqet, there were several more minor scorpion goddesses, including Hededet and Ta-Bitjet. A group of seven scorpions also appear as protectors of Isis in the myth of her raising her son Horus.

== Oracular animals ==
Animals are frequently used for the purposes of divination.

Birds are especially common in this role, as by their faculty of flight they offer themselves to the interpretation as messengers between the celestial and human spheres. Augury was a highly developed practice of telling the future from the flight of birds in Classical Antiquity. The dove appears as an oracular animal in the story of Noah, and also in Thisbe in Boeotia there was a dove-oracle of Zeus. Animal imagery was also often employed in the oracular utterances in Ancient Greece. Parrot astrology is a form of divination using green parakeets which originated in South India and is still practiced in modern times.

In Chinese and Japanese folk religion, the tortoise is an oracular animal. Tortoise shells were used by ancient Chinese as oracle bones to make predictions.

A popular North American tradition is Groundhog Day, in which on February 2 each year a groundhog is used to predict whether there will be an early spring.

Notable oracular animals of the modern period include Lady Wonder, Punxsutawney Phil, Maggie the Monkey, Lazdeika the Crab, Paul the Octopus, and Sonny Wool.

== Shamanism and animals ==
Animals were an important aspect of the Shaman religion in Central Asia. Also known as "assistant spirits," "guardian spirits," and "helping spirits," animal spirits are an integral part of a shaman's work. The more animal spirits a shaman had under his control, the more powerful the shaman. When a shaman set out to journey spiritually to the outer world, animals were a key component, assisting him in his work. There were three primary reasons for a shaman to take such a journey: to find a lost soul, to bring an animal spirit to the high gods, or to lead a soul to its new resting place in the underworld. All of these were extremely important to followers of shamanism and animals were extremely important in facilitating the shaman's efforts.

An example of animal spirits in Shamanism comes from the Yenisei Ostiaks culture. During a healing procedure, a shaman invokes a number of animal spirits to help him. The spirits arrive and enter his body. The shaman is not possessed by these spirits; he is free to expel them at any time. His body begins to leap all over the place, symbolizing that his soul is rising, leaving the earth and going up to the sky. It is a bird spirit that is lifting him through the atmosphere and he cries for it to take him higher so he can see further. According to Adolf Friedrich, at this point the shaman's essence has, in fact, transformed into the bird spirit that crossed the threshold into his body. He finally spots what he is looking for, the soul of his ill patient. Still assisting him, the animal spirits carry the shaman to the patient's soul. The shaman retrieves it and returns the soul to its rightful place, healing the patient. Without the presence of animal spirits, the shaman could not have accomplished such a feat.

In the Inner Eurasian religion, the transformation of a shaman's essence into an animal spirit is referred to as "becoming an animal". The importance of animals in this shamanic religion is shown by the capabilities that animals grant to human beings. Without the assistance of animals, humans from Inner Eurasia were not capable of reaching the sky, traveling rapidly throughout the earth, or going beneath the earth's outer crust, all of which were important activities to the culture. Heaven was not attainable for a person without the assistance of an eagle. Because of the eagle, an animal, the Inner Eurasians believed that they were capable of achieving their after-life and living in the home of their ancestors and Supreme God after their departure from the earth. Heaven was represented by the people in assemblies of animals, usually grouped in sevens or nines. When participating in hunting or warfare, Inner Eurasians also took on animal qualities because they believed it would increase their success. Animals were a central part of this religion.

== Attitudes in ancient Judaism and Christianity ==
=== Hebrew Bible ===
Jewish tradition, originating in the Hebrew Bible, displays an opposition to animal worship that emerged in the context of Canaanite veneration of animal images, including calves or young bulls associated with deities such as Baal, El, and Dagon that existed in the ancient Levant. The Hebrew Bible presents the worship of a golden calf as a recurring apostasy: the Israelites fashion and worship one at Mount Sinai while Moses is on the mountain (Exodus 32), and centuries later, after the united Israelite kingdom divides, Jeroboam I, king of northern Israel, sets up similar calf images at Dan and Bethel (1 Kings 12:28–30; 2 Kings 10:29). Even an object of legitimate origin could be rejected on these grounds. Hezekiah, king of Judah, destroyed Nehushtan, a brass serpent originally fashioned by Moses at God's instruction (Numbers 21:6–9), once it had come to be venerated as a cult object in its own right (2 Kings 18:4).

=== Second Temple period ===
Jewish texts from the Second Temple period frequently criticize or even mock animal worship. The Septuagint's version of the Book of Jeremiah mocks worshippers of Apis, and the Letter of Aristeas (composed during the 3rd or early 2nd century BC) treats Egyptian devotion to untamed creatures as a sign of foolishness. The Book of Wisdom (mid-first century BC) pictures Egyptians suffering because of the same creatures they worship. Philo, an Alexandria-based Jewish philosopher (writing c. 20–40 AD), argued that those who bestow divine honors on animals degrade their own souls, transforming them into beasts. He also linked this devaluation of true divinity to the Alexandrians' willingness to deify the Roman emperor Caligula (r. 37–41 AD).

Some Egyptian and Greco-Roman writers made similar accusations against Jews. Egyptian writers linked the Jews with the Hyksos, earlier foreign rulers of Egypt, alleging that both groups revered Seth-Typhon whose associated animal was the wild ass. Writers including Mnaseas, Apion, and Damocritus claimed that Jews worshipped the head of an ass placed in the Jerusalem Temple, an accusation Josephus rebutted in Against Apion. The Roman writer Petronius spread a separate rumor that Jews regarded a pig as divine.

The third-century BC Egyptian priest Manetho accused Moses of ordering the Israelites to slaughter and consume animals Egyptians held sacred. This accusation survives through Josephus' Against Apion, and was repeated in the first century AD by the Roman historian Tacitus in his work Histories. Some scholars suggest that Egyptian opposition to the sacrifice of lambs during the festival of Passover may have contributed to the destruction of the Jewish temple at Elephantine in 410 BC. The temple was located beside a sanctuary dedicated to the ram god Khnum.

=== Early Christianity ===
The New Testament continues the critique of animal-based worship. In Romans 1:23, Paul the Apostle condemns humanity's exchange of the worship of God for images resembling birds, animals, and reptiles, possibly drawing on themes from the Wisdom of Solomon. Revelation 13 likewise depicts the world worshipping a beast from the sea, a hybrid creature with blasphemous names on its ten heads.

== Religious and cultural representation of animals ==
=== Buddhism ===
One of the most important sanctions of the Buddhist faith is the concept of ahimsa, or refraining from the destruction of life. According to Buddhist belief, humans do not deserve preferential treatment over other living beings. Thus, the world is not specifically meant for human use and should be shared equally amongst all creatures. Buddhists recognize that all animals are sentient and are capable of feeling pain, grief, fear, happiness, and hunger. The Dalai Lama once said "Even ants and other insects will run away from danger... They have intelligence and want to live too. Why should we harm them?". Not believing in inflicting harm on any living, sentient being, some Buddhists also follow a vegetarian diet to avoid causing pain to animals.

Avoiding the destruction of life can affect aspects beyond a Buddhist's diet, such as travel plans. In order to avoid crushing any living thing, be it plant, insect, or animal, some Buddhist monks do not travel during rainy seasons. Originally, shortly after Buddhism was first founded, monks traveled during all seasons, but public opinion changed this. The people protested that so much life was crushed and destroyed when monks traveled during the wet season. As a result, monks were required to seek shelter during this season and abstain from journeys.

Living creatures, including humans, culminate to form one large, united life force in the Buddhist religion. Buddhists, therefore, believe that to harm another living creature is to, in fact, harm yourself as all life forms are interrelated. There are many tales that depict humans sacrificing their lives so that an animal may live. A jataka, or previous incarnation story, tells how the Buddha, (upon hearing the distraught cries of a lioness struggling to feed her hungry cubs), leapt from a cliff and smashed his body to death as an offering so that she could feed his flesh to them.

=== Hinduism ===
Hinduism is one of the six primary religions of India. Hinduism has evolved over several centuries from Vedic times when there was no restriction on animal worship and also animal consumption for food, to later Buddhist and Jain-influenced eras that led to a wider concept adoption of non-violence or ahimsa and respect for animals, as a major constituent in Dharmic belief systems. Humans and animals are believed to be one family and therefore, humans should treat all living creatures with respect and kindness. It is also believed that human beings themselves re-incarnate as animals based on their deeds or karma. Pets are often treated as if they are truly members of the family.

There are some exceptions to ahimsa in Hinduism—mainly dealing with religious rituals to please gods on special occasions and for daily sustenance. While Hindu belief proscribes the slaughter for human pleasure or lavishness, animal sacrifice has been an accepted ritual in some parts of India. An example of such lavishness would be hunting for pleasure, a fur coat made from animal skin, etc. An explanation for this supposed paradox is that a sacrificial animal is not really considered to be an animal, but a symbol. Thus, when the animal is sacrificed, they are sacrificing the symbol and not the animal.

=== Inca Empire ===
The Inca Empire, the most well-known indigenous group of people in South America, had a strong religious relationship with animals in their environment, believing that they were the gods presenting themselves to the Incas. This was reflected in the form of ceramics such as Huaco and in metalwork such as the "Inca Silver Alpaca".

One Incan animal god is the Urcuchillay, who was worshipped by herders. He was believed to take the shape of a multi-colored llama who watched over the livestock. Urcuchillay was believed to be essential for the health of the herd, the resources from the herd, and the health of the next generation of the herd. Pariacaca (Paryaqaqa), the Incan god of water and rainstorms, was believed to have been born a falcon but later became human. The Incas believed if they upset this god, he would bring floods. Little is known about Pariacaca. Mama Cocha, (Cochamama) or the Mother of the Ocean, is the Incan goddess of the sea and sea animals. She was heavily worshipped by sailors and fishermen who wanted to ensure a great supply of fish and sought her help in navigating the storms and calming the seas. She was believed to be the mother of Inti (Sun God) and Mama Killa (Goddess of the Moon).

=== Jainism ===
Mahavira, the 24th Teerthankar of Jainism, believed that the only way to be released from the cycle of life (birth, death, and then rebirth), one must follow ahimsa and not harm any living creature. Some Jains will carry a broom with them and sweep their path as they walk to avoid stepping on any living creature. Jains will also wear masks over their mouths to prevent swallowing insects and inspect their fruit for worms. The fruit inspection is not, however, because of their aversion to worms, but for the protection of the worms themselves. Jains are also only allowed to eat during daylight hours when their vision is not restricted so that they avoid eating insects or other small creatures that could possibly be in their food.

Jainism includes a lay form that is somewhat less restrictive. Basically lay Jains must distinguish between what forms of violence are necessary and unnecessary, but do not have to abstain entirely. This results in avoiding all forms of hunting, tilling the soil (tilling involved disturbing creatures embedded in the earth), and brewing (brewing involved using living organisms such as yeasts).

Food will never be prepared especially for them. They beg for food from others believing that because the food was prepared for someone else, they are not the cause of violence towards living creatures.

Lay Jains, who have the financial capacity, will visit animal markets and buy/rescue animals destined for slaughter for the good that it does.

== See also ==
- Animal welfare
- Animal-assisted therapy
- Animism
- Anthrozoology
- Moral status of animals in the ancient world
- Nature worship
- Totemism
