= Waghoba =

Hindu deity

Waghoba (Marathi: वाघोबा) is an ancient tiger/leopard deity worshipped by a number of tribes in India for centuries. Depending on the region of India, the deity is either described exclusively as a tiger or a leopard as a deity that can take both forms. There are several temples for the deity throughout India.

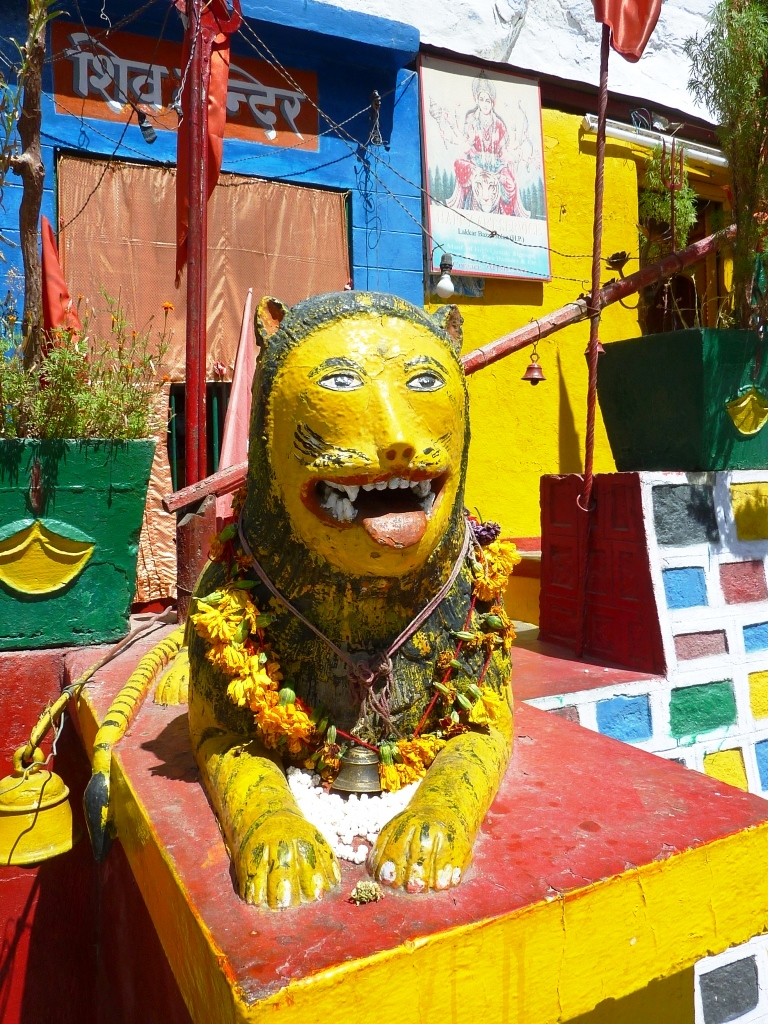
Waghoba at entrance to Hindu temple on Key to Nako road, Spiti

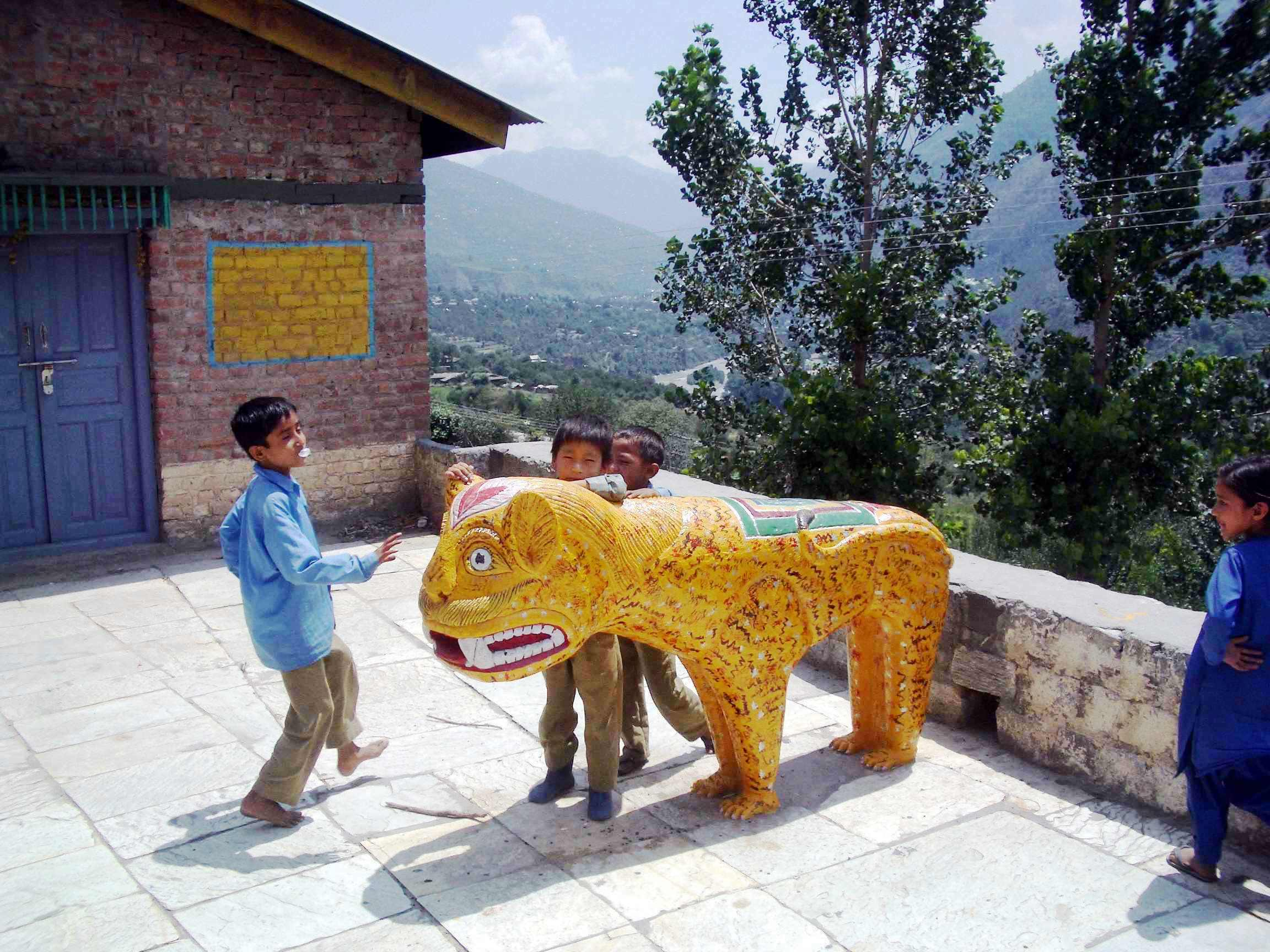
Children play with Waghoba at Kais temple, near Kullu.

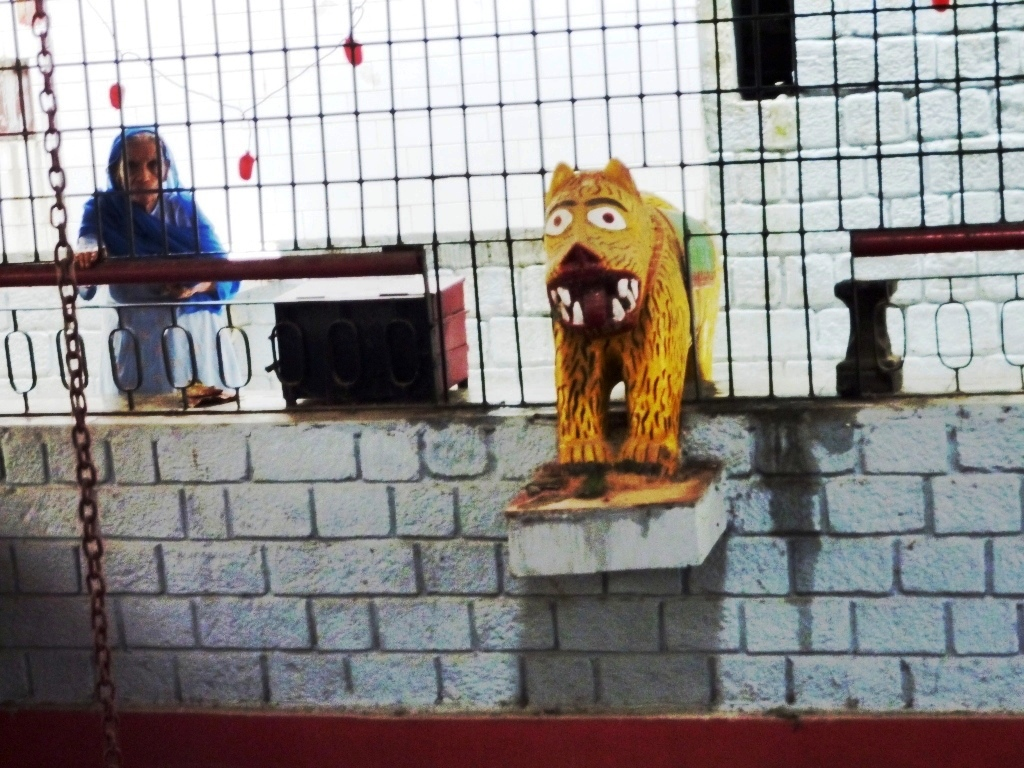
Waghoba overlooking Kuan Rani temple, Mandi, HP

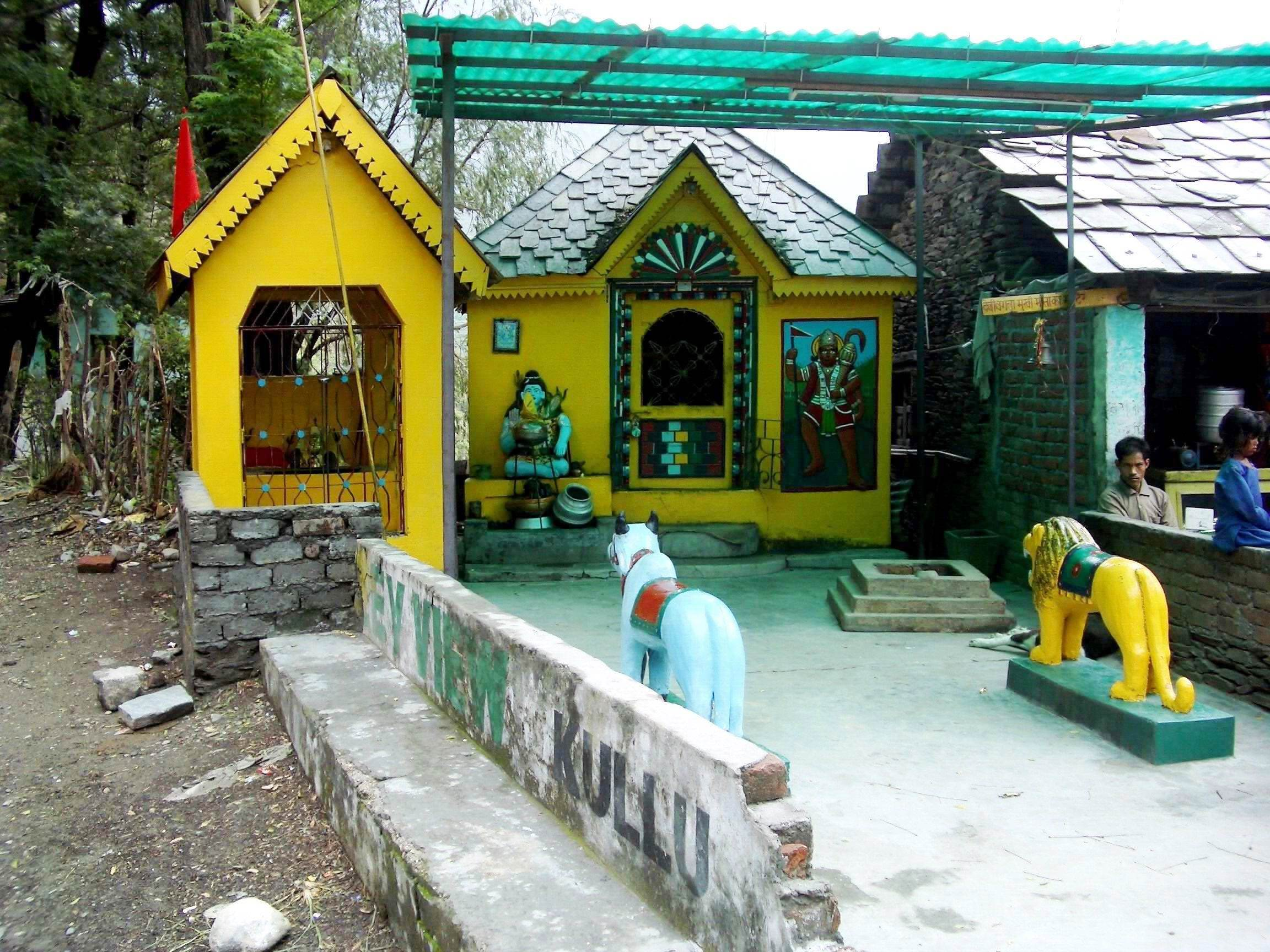
Waghoba facing roadside Hindu temple, near Kullu, HP.

== Etymology ==
The name "Waghoba" is a combination of two Marathi words, "wagh" and "ba". "Wagh" means tiger and "ba" is a common suffix to indicate respect. The deity is called by different names in different Indian regions. Other names include "Waghya Dev", "Wagh Dev", or "Baghdev" where "Dev" means deity; "Waghro", which is used in parts of Maharashtra and Goa; and Bagheshwar, which is a combination of the Hindi words "Bagh" (tiger) and "Ishwar" (god).

== Iconography ==
The Waghoba idol has the form of a large cat. Typically carved in or out of stone or wood, the idol is occasionally decorated with vermilion paint and can be accompanied with corresponding religious symbols, like the cobra, the sun, and the moon.

The idol is frequently found in small temples dedicated to the Waghoba but can also be found in bigger temples dedicated to other deities. In bigger temples, the Waghoba idol is often found next to chief deity's idol and is therefore regarded as the 'Vahana' (vehicle) of the chief deity. Many of the Waghoba idols are hundreds of years old but are still regularly worshiped by Indian communities. These communities strongly believe that the Waghoba protects them and the jungle.

== Rituals ==
The worshiping ritual is performed differently, depending on each Indian region. In Maharashtra's Thane district, some villages perform the rituals once a year on Kartik Barshi, which occurs twelve days after Diwali, according to the Hindu calendar. The ceremony is performed by a Bhagat, a person who is assumed to be possessed by a god. Only men from the villages attend the rituals. The Bhagat puts Tilak (a mark on the forehead) on the Waghoba statue and offers Prasad (an offering to the deity that is later distributed among the devotees). In the evening, the villagers dance in praise of the Waghya Dev. A Toran (festoon) is tied around the entire village to prevent the entry of leopards from another village...

In Goa, the deity is called Waghro. The state has a few shrines of the deity with centuries-old idols. In the Goan village, Vagragal, the deity is worshiped by the Velip community twice a year: two days after Ashadi Poornima, which usually occurs in July, and two days after Holi Poornima, which usually occurs in March. The one-hour ceremony is scheduled at 8 PM because the villagers believe that the Waghro's activities start at that time. The entire village gathers at the Waghro place to witness the rituals. It begins with the oiling of the idol and putting the 'Anant' flower on it as it is believed that the deity loves the flower. When the flower is not available, 'Anant' leaves and twigs are also used. Small offerings of rice and meat (probably wild pig) are put on banana leaves in a specific arrangement around the statue. Coconuts are broken in front of the idol. Some are placed next to it as an offering and some are later distributed among devotees as Prasad. Afterwards, as per their navas (vows to perform services for a god in return for a boon), some families behead roosters to offer their heads to the deity. The ritual ends with the priest praying for the well-being and safety of the villagers

== Tribes ==
Tribes, including the Bhaina, Bharia, Bhatra, Dangis, Gond, Gosain, Kol, Korku, Koshti, Velip, and Warli, are stout worshipers of Waghoba or Bagheshwar. They all bear a deep reverence towards the deity and have held strong beliefs about it for generations.

"The Bharias venerate Bageshwar, the tiger god, and believe that no tiger will eat a Bharia. On the day of Diwali, they invite the tiger to drink the gruel that they place for him behind their houses while simultaneously warning others not to stir. In the morning, they display the empty vessel as proof that the tiger visited them".

— R.V. Russell. "Tribes and castes of the Central Provinces of India," Vol. II, pg. 248

Kathotia, a sept named after a Kathota (a bowl), reveres the tiger god whose idol resides on a little platform on the sept's veranda. Its members may not join a tiger beat and will not sit up for a tiger over a kill. In the latter case, they believe that the tiger will not come and will be deprived of its food if they do so and all their family members will fall ill. If a tiger takes away one of their cattle, they think there has been some neglect in their worship of him. They say that if one meets a tiger in the forest, he should fold his hands and bow down and say "Maharaj, let me pass" and the tiger will walk away. If a tiger is killed within the limits of the village, a Kathotia Kol will throw away all his earthen pots in mourning and shave his head and feed a few men of his sept.

— R.V. Russell. "Tribes and castes of the Central Provinces of India," Vol. II, pg. 510

Gond – A man who has been killed by a tiger or a cobra may receive a general veneration with the object of appeasing his spirit and transforming him into a village god.

If a tiger makes trouble, a stone is set up in his honor, and he receives a small offering.

If a Gond, when starting a journey in the morning, should meet a tiger, he should return and postpone his journey. But if he meets a tiger during the journey, it is considered good luck. Gonds think they can attain strength by carrying tigers' shoulder bones on their shoulders or by drinking the dust of tigers' bones pounded in water.

— R.V. Russell. "Tribes and castes of the Central Provinces of India," Vol. II, pp.91, 95, 98, 105

== Perceptions and myths about the large cats ==
People sharing space with the large cats have their own perceptions of the animals, some of which are scientifically correct while some others are myths. Nonetheless, it is extremely important how the people place the large cats in their cultural and physical space. A study in Maharashtra and Goa areas where Waghoba shrines are located revealed that people have remarkable understanding of leopards' biology and behaviour in their area, such as leopard cubs are born once in two years, they stay with their mother, each leopard has its own territory and scent marks its borders, they are nocturnal and they can climb on a tree easily. On the other hand, they also believed that leopard dispels bad omen. Once it tastes human blood, it becomes a man eater and the man eaters are gigantic creatures (even bigger than tigers). These are myths but perhaps are ways in which the people negotiate their space with these large cats.

== Beliefs ==
People believe in two types of leopards; one which lives in and always belongs to the forest and the other which have been released in the forest (by the forest department). The first type is scared of humans and runs away wherever it sees one while the other is an exact opposite of earlier. It is not scared of humans at all and sometimes even comes close to the villagers.

People sharing space with the leopards also noted that they are broadly scared of humans; however, they possess individual characteristics like boldness and shyness. Every leopard with territory near human settlement unfailingly comes close the houses in search of easy domestic prey.

== Discussion ==
A literature from the state of Gujarat mentions Dangis, an indigenous people from the Dang region of the state, revere Waghoba and have a wooden statue of the large cat in each of their villages. This illustrates how the same animal is viewed in different ways by different groups of people. Their views are framed by their cultural heritage which eventually defines their behaviour in a shared landscape. Research has shown that several communities sharing space with these animals often regard them as "protectors", "owners", "family" or "vehicle of the gods." The tigers of the Sundarbans are considered to be the owners of the forest and worshipped as "Banobibi/Dakkhinrai" by both Hindus and Muslims while the tigers of Orissa are regarded as "Bagheshwar" and "Banjara" by the Santhals and the Kisans of the state.

Garos of Meghalaya, Gonds of Madhya Pradesh and Tulunadus of South Kanara district of Karnataka look upon the tiger as a protector. Garos wear necklace of the tiger claws embedded in gold or silver for protection and the Gonds carry the shoulder bone of the tiger believing it will bring them strength. The Irula tribe of Tamil Nadu also worships the tiger for protection from evil spirits. The Dhangars, a pastoralist community in Maharashtra, also revere the tiger as "Waghdev/Waghjai" with the belief that the deity will protect their sheep from tigers and leopards. A recent study showed that the Mishmi tribe in the northeast India sees the tiger as their brother. Except for a few exceptions like that of the Dhangars, these studies have no mention of Waghoba.

These beliefs and practices are not limited to India. These animals have been mentioned in traditional folklores of many cultures across the globe. Somewhere they have been referred to as benevolent gods and as malevolent agents in other cultures. The large cats have been integrated into the cultures via rituals, taboos, and practices. For example, the Tiger Compendium of 16th century China claims that tigers were both feared and revered.

Most of these beliefs and practices are based in superstition but the interviews of the people who share space with the large cats and have temples in their area, reveal that they also have a sound knowledge of the animals' biology and the precautions that need to be taken to protect themselves from the leopard. Thus, the deity of Waghoba sets about an important discussion in the field of conservation. It sheds light on a different level of human-animal relationship. Such a relationship has been rarely explored in the field of wildlife conservation.

Generally, there is a huge focus on the economic aspect of the "conflict" and the media also highlights such events in a sensational way. Such reporting could have serious ramifications on how policy is framed to deal with these otherwise complex interactions. The recent studies that look into the social and cultural aspects of the interactions teach us to go beyond the economic facets and explore the other kind of relationships existing between human and other carnivores, including the large cats. Today, because of various reasons, large carnivores are bound to increase their ranges into human dominated landscapes but conservationist and managers are unable to deal with the human dimension of the issue due to the negative narrative in the ecological sciences about human-large cat interactions.

Research shows that positive interactions were prevalent long before the inception of wildlife conservation as a discipline, but these interactions have received little focus in mainstream studies. As the aim of conservation is to promote coexistence, we need to look beyond the negative aspect of the human-animal interactions and try to understand co-adaptation strategies that humans have developed over the centuries to survive and flourish with the large cats. The institution of Waghoba is also one such religious and cultural adaptation to coexist with these species.
