= Karang Jiwo =

Karang Jiwo is a small village lying in the estuary of the Solo River, in the Lamongan regency.

The name of the village is divided in two parts, karang meaning "courtyard" and jiwo, "soul". The village's history was largely influenced by the Majapahit empire.
