= Rudiobus =

Celtic god

Rudiobus is a Celtic god known only from a single inscription, on a bronze figurine of a prancing horse: "sacred to the god Rudiobus". This figurine, from the 1st century BC, is one a group found at Neuvy-En-Sullias (Loiret). It may be an aspect of the Gaulish version of Mars, instead of an indigenous god. The hoard was discovered in 1861; the horse with the Rudiobus inscription is one meter high.
