= Book of the Heavenly Cow =

Ancient Egyptian text

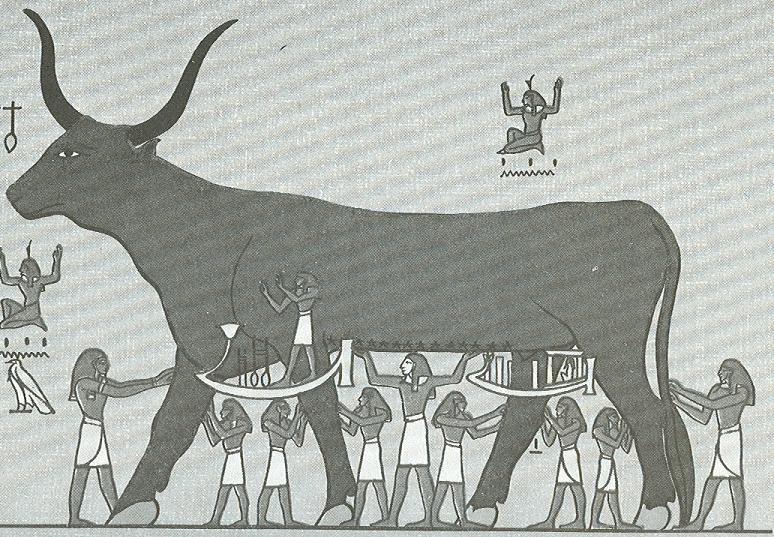
The sky goddess Nut depicted as a cow and supported by the eight Heh gods

The Book of the Heavenly Cow, or the Book of the Cow of Heaven, is an Ancient Egyptian text which, in part, describes the reasons for the imperfect state of the world in terms of humankind's rebellion against the supreme sun god, Ra. Divine punishment was inflicted through the goddess Hathor, with the survivors suffering through separation from Ra, who now resided in the sky on the back of Nut, the heavenly cow.

With this "fall", according to Erik Hornung's interpretation, suffering and death came into the world, along with a fracture in the original unity of creation. The creator god now changes into many heavenly bodies, creates the "Fields of Paradise" for the blessed dead, perhaps appoints Geb as his heir, hands over the rule of humankind to Osiris (Thoth ruling the night sky as his deputy), with Shu and the Heh gods now supporting the sky goddess Nut.

Though the text is recorded in the New Kingdom period, it is written in Middle Egyptian and may have been written during the Middle Kingdom period.

== Description ==
The earliest known copy of the Book of the Heavenly Cow was discovered in the outermost gilded shrine of Tutankhamun; however, the ancient text was incomplete. Three complete versions of the ancient text were discovered on the walls of the tombs of Seti I, Ramesses II, and Ramesses III. Each version of the texts was found in a subsidiary room of the sarcophagus chamber exclusively designed for the Book of the Heavenly Cow. Ramesses VI did not have a subsidiary room, but an excerpt from the book was inscribed in a niche in his tomb. Another excerpt is written on a papyrus from the Ramesside period, now in Turin.

== Origins ==
The book may have originated from the Pyramid Texts's dawn myth accounts, but by the New Kingdom the idea was developed to explain death and suffering in an imperfect creation. The work has been viewed as a form of theodicy and a magical text to ensure the king's ascent into heaven. It has also been viewed as thematically similar to more developed accounts of the destruction of humanity in the Mesopotamian and biblical flood myths. The reign of Akhenaten – the pharaoh who had attempted to bring about a break in the existent religious traditions – may be the inspiration for the work.

== Content ==
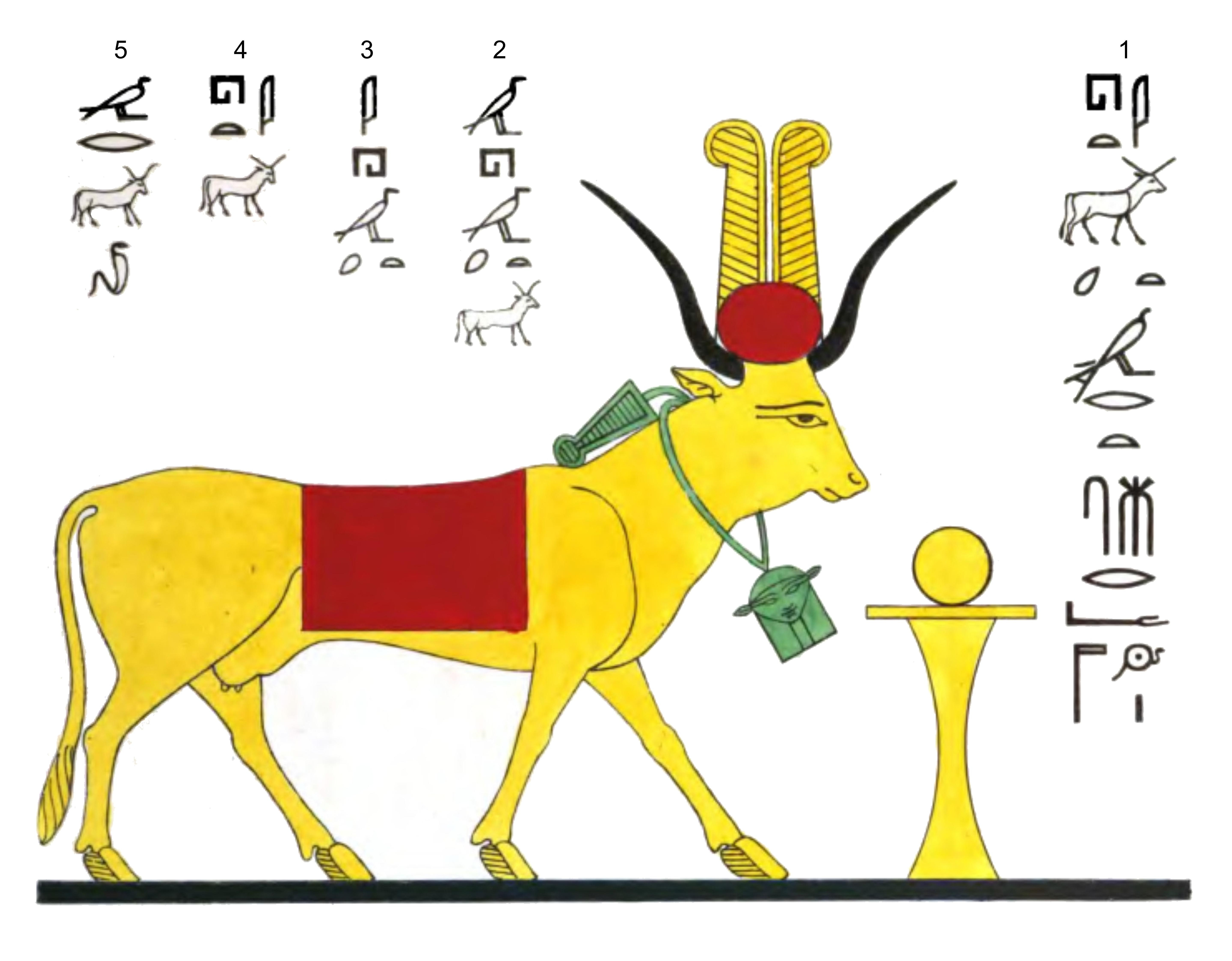

The Book of the Heavenly Cow is divided in half by the image of the cow and her supporters. There are no visible breaks in the actual text of The Heavenly Cow, aside from the representation of the Heavenly Cow. Due to this presentation method, there are no clear breaks in the text that allow for a clear structuring of the text. However, Egyptologists who examined the text closely suggested a loose division of the text into four sections. The first section describes the "Destruction of Mankind", in which humanity plots against the Sun God Ra. After Ra consulting with the other gods, the goddess Hathor is chosen by Ra to act as the violent Eye of Ra. She was to deliver divine punishment to humanity and did so by slaughtering the rebels and bringing death into the world. The survivors of Hathor's wrath were saved, when Ra tricked Hathor by putting dyed beer that resembled blood, which Hathor drinks, becoming intoxicated. The final part of the text deals with Ra's ascension into the sky, the creation of the underworld, and with the theology surrounding the ba (soul). The structure of the ancient Egyptian text the Book of the Heavenly Cow is structured into 330 verses, with half of the text occurring before a description or representation of the Heavenly Cow. The language used in the Book of the Heavenly Cow displays roots from Late Egyptian influences. Due to the ancient text containing roots from Late Egypt, it is widely believed among Egyptology scholars that the Book of the Heavenly Cow originated during the Amarna period.

The text has three images:

1. The goddess Nut (in the form of a cow) being supported by the eight Heh gods
2. Neneh (left) and Djet (right) as supporters of the sky
3. Pharaoh as supporter of the sky

== Publication ==
With the discovery of the Book of the Heavenly Cow, there have been many publications over the years discussing the contents of the ancient text. In 1876, Édouard Naville published English and French translations of the version of the Book of the Heavenly Cow from Seti I's tomb. It detailed the contents of the ancient text as well as gave much insight into the Book of the Heavenly Cow.

With the discovery of the text in Ramesses III, others published many books regarding the Book of the Heavenly Cow. In 1881 Heinrich published a German-language version (the first of its kind). This version of the book translated the contents of the Book of the Heavenly Cow into German with insight into the overall ancient text.

Alexandre Piankoff in 1955 published one of the first translations of the Book of the Heavenly Cow which heavily detailed the creation narrative and Erik Hornung in 1983 did the same thing but in more detail.

Antonio Loprieno and James P. Allen are two individuals who have made contributions to the subject of the Book of the Heavenly Cow. Loprieno's Ancient Egyptian Literature was published in 1996. His book consists of about twenty contributions by Egyptologists. It is mainly devoted to the history and genres that include linguistics, stylistic features, and many images of Ancient Egypt. The section that specifically deals with the Book of the Heavenly Cow is the Myth and Narrative section. It goes into detail about what a narrative is as well as how myths influence them. James P. Allen's book Genesis In Egypt: The Philosophy of Ancient Egyptian Creation Accounts, published in 1988, consists of thousands of texts that discuss the cosmology and cosmogony of Ancient Egypt. It sheds light on a question that plagued the minds of Egyptologists for years, the origin of the world (which the section of the heavenly cow deals with).

Anthony Spalinger in 2000 published his translations of the Book of the Heavenly Cow that heavily went into detail about the text as a myth, as well as about the time period it originated in.
