= Chadayamangalam Assembly constituency =

Constituency of the Kerala legislative assembly in India

Chadayamangalam
- Constituency No. 122 for the Kerala Legislative Assembly
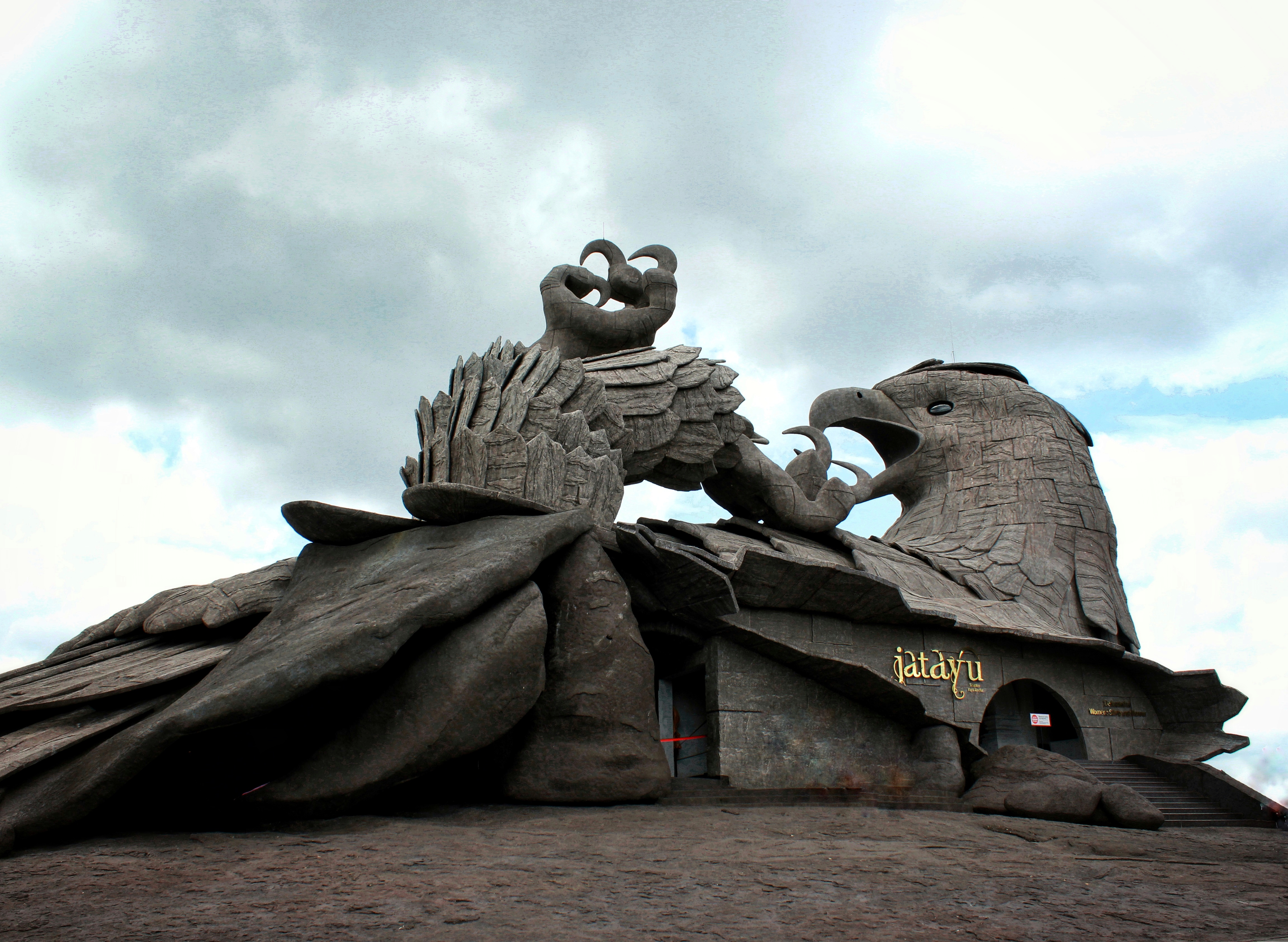
- Jatayu Park in Chadayamangalam Assembly constituency

Constituency details
- Country: India
- Region: South India
- State: Kerala
- District: Kollam
- Established: 1957
- Total electors: 2,01,716 (2026)
- Reservation: None

Member of Legislative Assembly
- 16th Kerala Legislative Assembly
- Incumbent M. M. Naseer
- Party: INC
- Alliance: UDF
- Elected year: 2026

Chadayamangalam is the 122nd legislative assembly constituency in the southeast of Kollam district in Kerala, India. Chadayamangalam Assembly Constituency is a part of Kollam Lok Sabha Constituency, Kottarakkara Taluk, Punalur Taluk, Chadayamangalam Block Panchayat, Anchal Block Panchayat and the Punalur Revenue Division. It is one among the eleven assembly constituencies in the district. As of the 2026 assembly elections, the current MLA is M. M. Naseer of Indian National Congress.

== Local self-governed segments ==
Chadayamangalam Assembly constituency is composed of the following local self-governed segments.

Sl no.	Name	Status (Grama panchayat)	Taluk	Ruling alliance
1	Alayamon	Grama panchayat	Punalur	UDF
2	Chadayamangalam	Grama panchayat	Kottarakkara	LDF
3	Chithara	Grama panchayat	Kottarakkara	UDF
4	Elamad	Grama panchayat	Kottarakkara	UDF
5	Ittiva	Grama panchayat	Kottarakkara	LDF
6	Kadakkal	Grama panchayat	Kottarakkara	LDF
7	Kummil	Grama Panchayat	Kottarakkara	UDF
8	Nilamel	Grama panchayat	Kottarakkara	UDF
9	Velinalloor	Grama panchayat	Kottarakkara	LDF

== Electoral history ==
=== Travancore-Cochin Legislative Assembly Elections ===
Year	Winner	Party	Vote Margin	Coalition
1951	Kesava Pillai	Indian National Congress	1,703	Right
1951	Kochukunju	Praja Socialist Party	642	NA
1954	V. Gangadharan	Praja Socialist Party	9,634	NA

== Members of the Legislative Assembly ==
The following list contains all members of Kerala legislative assembly who have represented the constituency:

Election	Niyama Sabha	Member	Party	Tenure
1957	1st	Veliyam Bhargavan	Communist Party of India	1957–1960
1960	2nd	Veliyam Bhargavan	Communist Party of India	1960–1965
1967	3rd	D. D. Potti	Samyukta Socialist Party	1967–1970
1970	4th	M. N. Govindan Nair	Communist Party of India	1970–1977
1977	5th	E. Chandrasekharan Nair	Communist Party of India	1977–1980
1980	6th	E. Chandrasekharan Nair	Communist Party of India	1980–1982
1982	7th	K. R. Chandramohan	Communist Party of India	1982–1984
1987	8th	K. R. Chandramohan	Communist Party of India	1987–1991
1991	9th	E. Rajendran	Communist Party of India	1991–1996
1996	10th	R. Latha Devi	Communist Party of India	1996–2001
2001	11th	Prayar Gopalakrishnan	Indian National Congress	2001–2006
2006	12th	Mullakara Ratnakaran	Communist Party of India	2006–2011
2011	13th	Mullakara Ratnakaran	Communist Party of India	2011–2016
2016	14th	Mullakara Ratnakaran	Communist Party of India	2016 - 2021
2021	15th	J. Chinchu Rani	Communist Party of India	2021 - 2026
2026	16th	M. M. Naseer	Indian National Congress	2026 -

== Election results ==
Percentage change (±%) denotes the change in the number of votes from the immediate previous election.

=== 2026 ===
There are 2,01,716 registered voters in the constituency for the 2026 Kerala Assembly election.

2026 Kerala Legislative Assembly election: Chadayamangalam
Party	Candidate	Votes	%	±%
INC	M M Naseer	68,281	44.55	▲8.15
CPI	J. Chinchu Rani	60,795	39.67	▼6.02
BJP	R S Arun raj	20,971	13.68	▼1.43
SDPI	Sharafath Mallam	1,674	1.09	▼0.19
Anna DHRM	Aji Kadassery	381	0.25	▲0.04
Independent	G Jayan Moonlight Chithara	277	0.18	
NOTA	None of the above	881	0.57	▲0.10
Margin of victory		7,486	4.88	▼2.13
Turnout		1,53,260	75.97	▲1.37
INC gain from CPI		Swing	▲8.15	

=== 2021 ===
There were 1,97,285 registered voters in the constituency for the 2021 Kerala Assembly election.

2021 Kerala Legislative Assembly election: Chadayamangalam
Party	Candidate	Votes	%	±%
CPI	J. Chinchu Rani	67,252	45.69	▼3.41
INC	M.M.Naseer	53,574	36.40	▲2.41
BJP	Vishnu Pattathanam	22,238	15.11	▲1.84
SDPI	Sharafath Mallam	1,879	1.28	▲0.28
NOTA	None of the above	685	0.47	▼0.01
WPOI	Archana Prajith	605	0.41	▼0.07
BSP	Lalu	406	0.28	
Anna DHRM	Ratheesh Kadakkal	280	0.19	
Independent	Shibu.K.Chadayamangalam	258	0.18	
Margin of victory		13,678	9.29	▼5.82
Turnout		1,47,177	74.60	▲0.82
CPI hold		Swing	▼3.41	

=== 2016 ===
There were 1,96,733 registered voters in the constituency for the 2016 Kerala Assembly election.

2016 Kerala Legislative Assembly election: Chadayamangalam
Party	Candidate	Votes	%	±%
CPI	Mullakkara Ratnakaran	71,262	49.10	▼6.80
INC	M. M. Hassan	49,334	33.99	▼3.37
BJP	K. Sivadasan	19,259	13.27	▲10.01
SDPI	Jaleel Kadakkal	1,445	1.00	▼0.41
WPOI	Sajeed Khaleedu	1,222	0.84	−
NOTA	None of the above	699	0.48	
Independent	Sunny Itriva	538	0.37	
SS	Sreejith S.	284	0.20	
Margin of victory		21,928	15.11	▼3.43
Turnout		1,45,141	73.78	▲2.03
CPI hold		Swing	▼6.80	

=== 2011 ===
There were 1,77,610 registered voters in the constituency for the 2011 election.

2011 Kerala Legislative Assembly election: Chadayamangalam
Party	Candidate	Votes	%	±%
CPI	Mullakkara Ratnakaran	71,231	55.90	
INC	Shahida Kamal	47,607	37.56	
BJP	T. C. Saju Kumar	4,160	3.26	
SDPI	Jaleel Kadakkal	1,800	1.41	
Independent	Shibu K. Chadayamangalam	1,078	0.85	−
BSP	Kootukkal Prasad	996	0.78	
Independent	Oyoor Nazeer	557	0.44	
Margin of victory		23,624	18.54	
Turnout		1,27,429	71.75	
CPI hold		Swing		

=== 2006 ===
2006 Kerala Legislative Assembly election: Chadayamangalam
Party	Candidate	Votes	%	±%
CPI	Mullakkara Ratnakaran	47,284	49.90	
INC	Prayar Gopalakrishnan	42,631	45.00	
BJP	Yeroor Anil	2,533	2.67	
Margin of victory		4,653	4.90	
Turnout		94,749		
CPI gain from INC		Swing		

=== 2001 ===
There were 1,43,376 registered voters in the constituency for the 2001 election.

2001 Kerala Legislative Assembly election: Chadayamangalam
Party	Candidate	Votes	%	±%
INC	Prayar Gopalakrishnan	49,683	49.33	
CPI	R. Latha Devi	47,764	47.43	
BJP	V. S. Unnikrishnan	3,263	3.24	
Margin of victory		1,919	1.90	
Turnout		1,00,710	70.25	
INC gain from CPI		Swing		

=== 1996 ===
There were 1,31,047 registered voters in the constituency for the 1996 election.

1996 Kerala Legislative Assembly election: Chadayamangalam
Party	Candidate	Votes	%	±%
CPI	R. Latha Devi	42,550	48.74	
INC	Prayar Gopalakrishnan	39,804	45.59	
PDP	Abdul Rasheed	3,258	3.73	
Margin of victory		2,746	3.19	
Turnout		87,306	68.00	
CPI hold		Swing		
