= K. R. Chandramohan =

Indian politician

Member of the Kerala Legislative Assembly
- In office 1982–1991
- Preceded by: E. Chandrasekharan Nair
- Succeeded by: E. Rajendran
- Constituency: Chadayamangalam

Personal details
- Party: Communist Party of India

K. R. Chandramohan is an Indian politician and leader of Communist Party of India. He represented Chadayamangalam constituency in 7th and 8th Kerala Legislative Assembly.
