= R. Latha Devi =

Indian politician

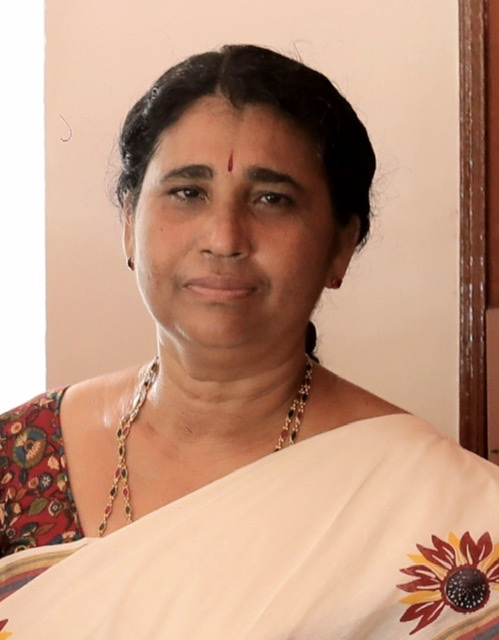

Member of legislative assembly
- In office 1996–2001
- Preceded by: E. Rajendran
- Succeeded by: Prayar Gopalakrishnan
- Constituency: Chadayamangalam

Personal details
- Born: 30 July 1963 (age 63) India
- Party: Communist party of India
- Spouse: G. R. Anil
- Parent(s): C.N. Raghavan Pillai; C. Devaki Amma
- Education: SN College, University of Kerala
- Profession: Politician

Dr. Raghavan Pillai Latha Devi is an Indian politician from Kerala. She represented Chadayamangalam constituency in 10th Kerala Legislative Assembly.

== Early life and education ==
Dr. R. Latha Devi was born to C.N. Raghavan Pillai and C. Devakiamma on 30 July 1963 at Charipparampu, Ittiva Panchayat (Kollam District). She did her schooling at Govt. Higher School Kadakkal and pursued her higher education from SN college Kollam and University College Thiruvananthapuram. The CPI leader secured 1st rank in MA history and later completed her Ph.D. in 2003, both from the University of Kerala. She worked as the Associate professor (Dept. of History) in SN college Varkala until 2019.

== Political career ==
She was an active member of the All India Students Federation (AISF) and All India Youth Federation (AIYF) during her student days and later became State Vice President and women’s wing convener of these organizations. She came to the limelight by leading thirty-three days long women’s foot march in the year 1988 for overall development and employment organized by AIYF covering more than 600kms from Kasarkode to Thiruvananthapuram, which was the first of its kind in Kerala by a youth organization. In 1996, she successfully contested from Chadayamangalam assembly constituency and became a member of the 10th Kerala Legislative Assembly. The CPI leader has held several positions such as National council member of All India Kisan Sabha (AIKS), member of syndicate (University of Kerala), member of CPI Kerala State Executive, and was president of various organizations such as Kerala Mahila Sangham (NFIW), Kerala Mahila Pradhan and SAS Union (AITUC), Progressive Federation of College Teachers. She is presently a member of the CPI State Council and State Joint Secretary of Kerala Mahila Sangham (NFIW).

== Personal life ==
She is married to Adv. G.R. Anil who was serving as Minister handling portfolios of Legal metrology, Consumer Affairs, Food, and Civil supplies in the Pinarayi Vijayan Government.
