= Kilimarathukavu Temple =

Hindu temple in Kerala, India

- കിളിമരത്തുകാവ് ക്ഷേത്രം
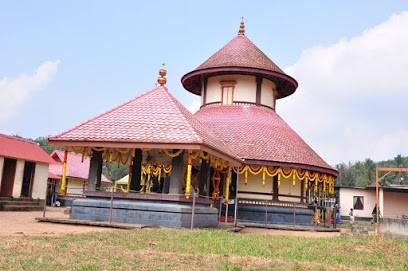
- The main temple

- Kilimarathukavu Temple, Kadakkal, Kollam, Kerala

Religion
- Affiliation: Hinduism
- District: Kollam
- Deity: Shiva
- Festivals: Shivaratri, Skanda Shashti, Navaratri, Hanuman Jayanti
- Governing body: Travancore Devaswom Board

Location
- Location: Kadakkal
- State: Kerala
- Country: India
- Coordinates: 8°49′44.3″N 76°55′14.6″E

Architecture
- Type: Traditional Kerala style
- Completed: Records indicate the temple is thousands of years old. Renovated in the 21st century.

Specifications
- Temple: One
- Monument: As per traditional vastushastra
- Elevation: 150 m (492 ft)

Website
- www.kilimarathukavu.com

Kilimarathukavu Shiva Parvathy Temple is a Hindu temple located in Kadakkal Kollam district, Kerala, India. The temple deities include the cult images of 'Dharma Shastha', and an epithet of Ayyappan is also present within the temple. Kilimarathukavu Temple was taken over by the Travancore Devaswom Board under Government of Kerala in 2011.

== History ==
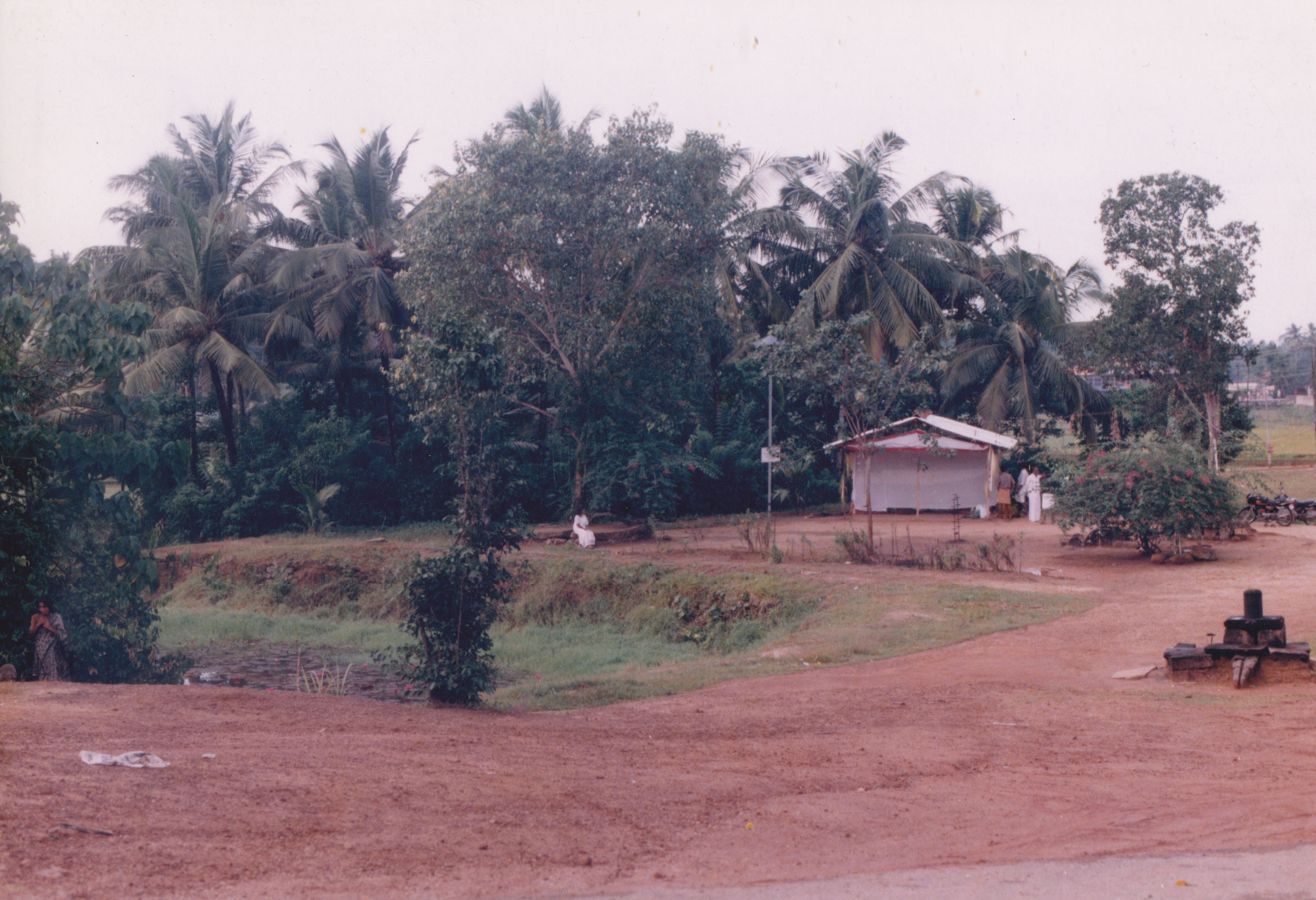
Kilimarathukavu temple compound before renovation

Kilimarathukavu Temple is believed to be an ancient temple that was destroyed, leaving only idols behind. A new temple was constructed sometime in the 21st century.

== Temple legend ==
As requested by Parvati, Shiva came in front of Arjuna disguised as a tribal man, and Parvati as a tribal woman. Same time an asura in the form of a pig was sent by Duryodhana to kill Arjuna. Arjuna and Shiva (in his disguise) shot the monster with their arrows. During the ensuing argument, Arjuna struck the tribal man (Shiva in disguise) with his bow. Parvati stopped him and revealed the man's true identity. Hearing this, Arjuna did the Sashtanga Namaskara, and Shiva gifted him the Pashupatastra and blessed him. Several other Hindu deities, including Ganapathy, Murugan, Shastha, and Anjaneyan, also joined the scene. Shiva, satisfied with Arjuna's devotion told him, "The place where we are now is very sacred, and whoever comes here for prayer shall be blessed". Upon saying this Shiva disappeared and a Shivalingam appeared in his place. Today, the two Shivalingams in this temple are worshipped by devotees.

== Deities ==
The temple has two Shiva deities: Shiva and Mahanadan.

== Festivals ==
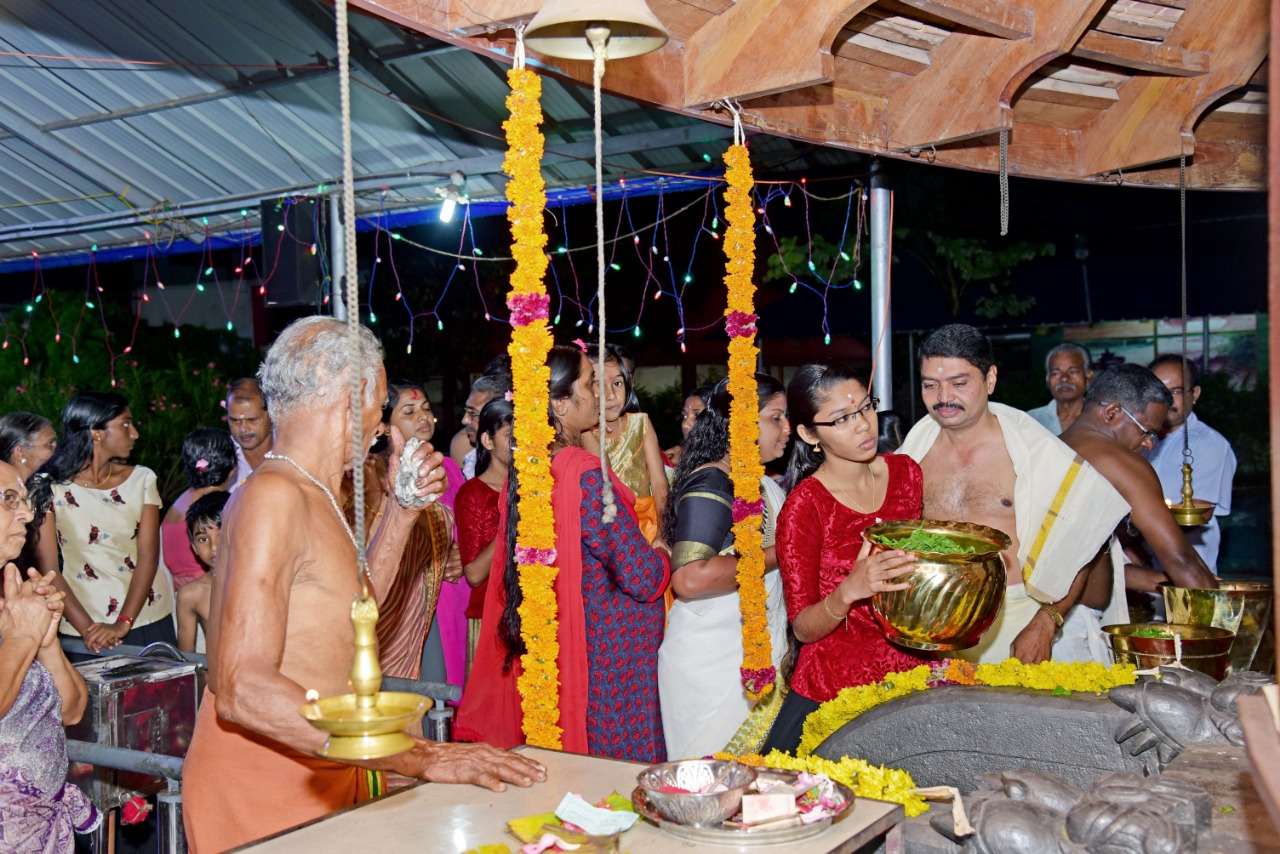
Navaratri Pooja

- Maha Shivaratri on Kumbham, Malayalam calendar.
- Navaratri on Kanni, Malayalam calendar.
- Skandha Shashti on Thulam, Malayalam calendar.
- Mandalapooja Makaravilakku on Vrischika, Malayalam calendar.
- Hanuman Jayanti on Medam, Malayalam calendar.

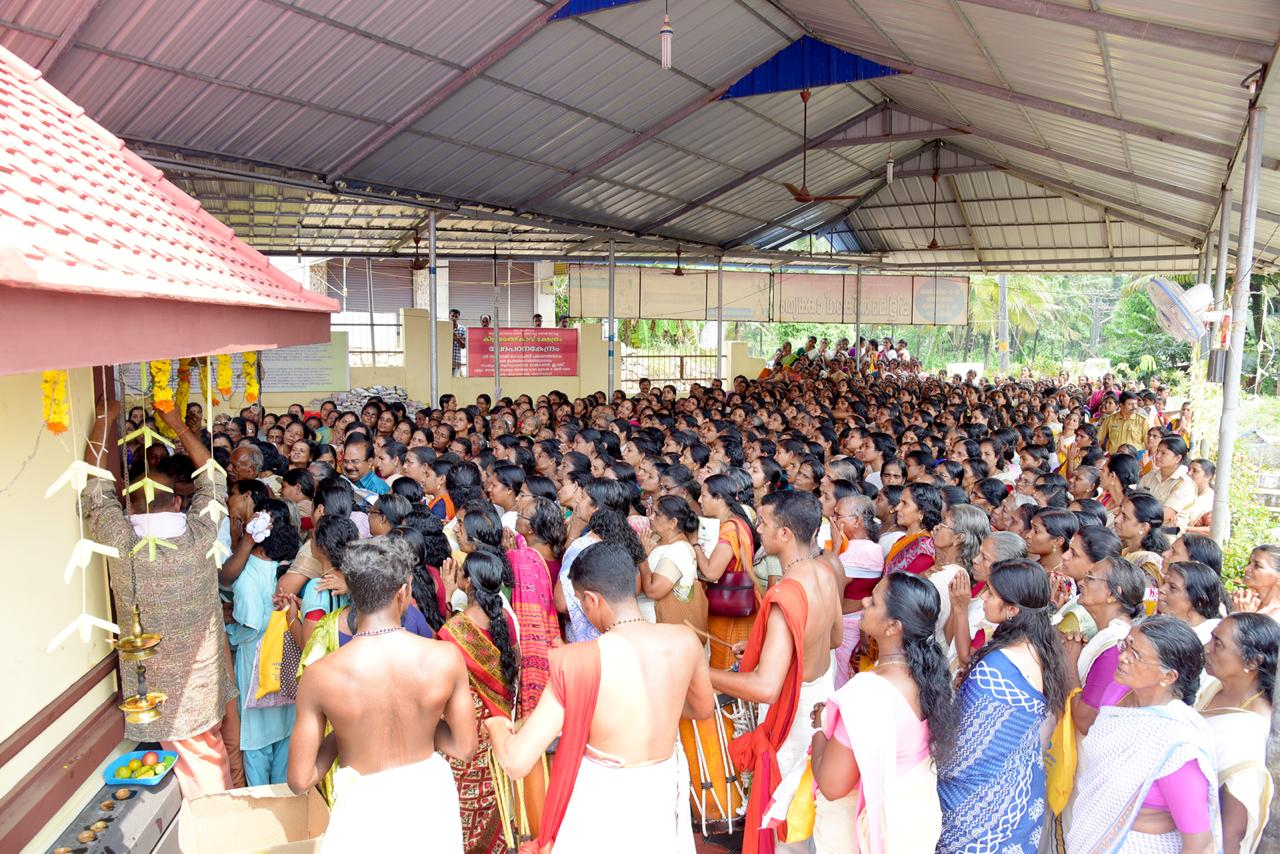
Skandha Shashti

== See also ==
- Guruvayoorappan
- Kadakkal Devi Temple
- Kulathupuzha Sastha Temple
- Sabarimala
- Sri Padmanabhaswami Temple
- Hindu temples of Kerala
- Chottanikara Bhagavathy Amman Temple
