= G. R. Anil =

Indian politician

Adv. G. R. Anil
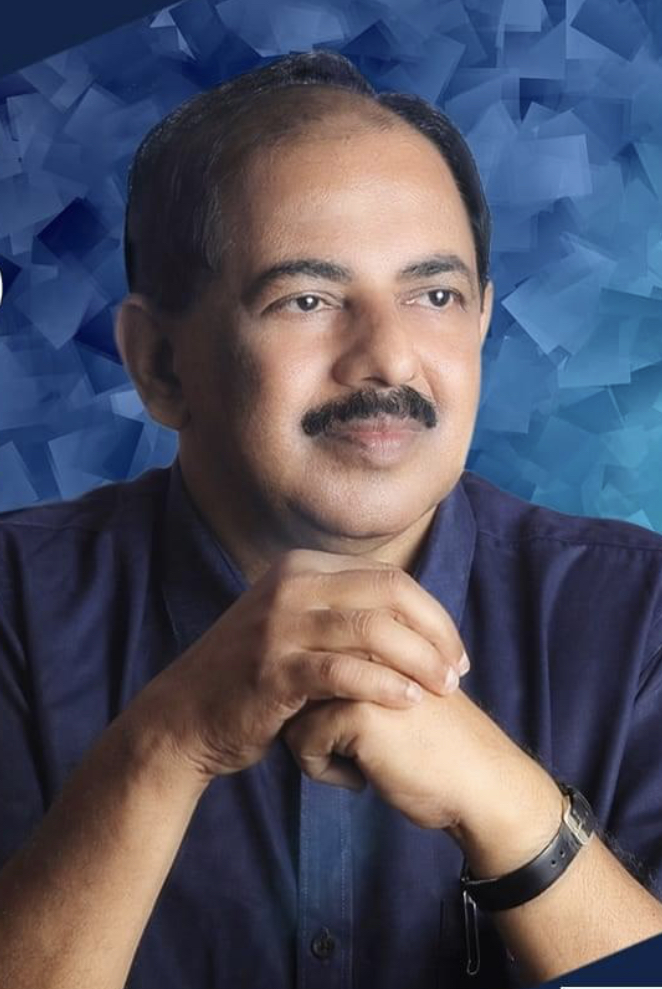

Minister for Food and Civil Supplies, Consumer Affairs, Legal Metrology, Government of Kerala
- In office 20 May 2021 – 17 May 2026
- Chief Minister: Pinarayi Vijayan
- Preceded by: P. Thilothaman
- Succeeded by: Anoop Jacob

Member of the Kerala Legislative Assembly
- Incumbent
- Assumed office 24 May 2021
- Preceded by: C. Divakaran
- Constituency: Nedumangad

Personal details
- Born: 30 May 1963 (age 63) Nadakkavu, Thiruvananthapuram, Kerala, India
- Party: Communist Party of India
- Spouse: R. Latha Devi
- Children: Devika A.L
- Parent(s): V. Ramankutti Pillai; G. Sarojini Amma

Govindapillai Ramankutty Anil (born 30 May 1963), is an Indian politician who served as the Minister for Food and Civil Supplies, Consumer Affairs and Legal Metrology of Kerala from 2021 to 2026. He is a Member of the Kerala Legislative Assembly representing Nedumangad since 2021.

== Early life and education ==
G. R. Anil was born to V Ramankuttipillai and G Sarojiniamma at Nadukadu, Thiruvananthapuram. He did his schooling at Salvation Army School, Nadukkadu; Krishnapuram Upper Primary School, and SMV High School, Thiruvananthapuram. He pursued his higher education from MG College, University College, and Kerala Law Academy Law College, all in Thiruvananthapuram.

== Personal life ==
His family includes his wife R. Latha Devi who represented Chadayamangalam constituency in 10th Kerala Legislative Assembly, daughter Devika A.L, son in law Major Vishnu S.P who is a military officer in the Indian Army and grand daughter Anugraha Veda.
