= Mullakkara Retnakaran =

Indian politician (born 1954)

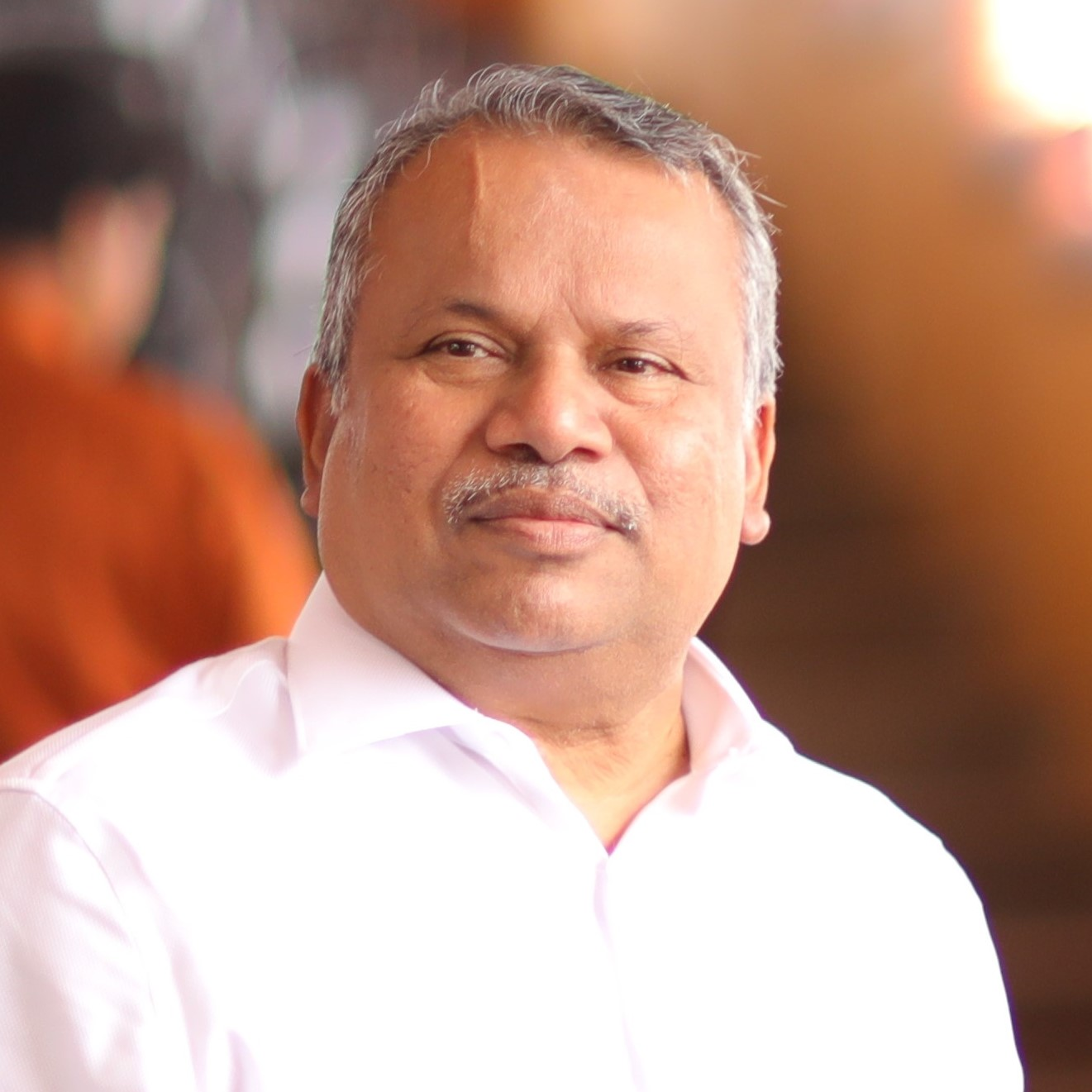
- Mullakkara Retnakaran

Member of Kerala Legislative Assembly
- In office 11 May 2006 – 2 May 2021
- Preceded by: Prayar Gopalakrishnan
- Constituency: Chadayamangalam

Minister of Agriculture, Government of Kerala
- In office 18 May 2006 – 14 May 2011
- Preceded by: K. R. Gowri Amma
- Succeeded by: K. P. Mohanan

Chairman, Legislative Committee on Environment, Kerala
- In office 25 January 2019 – 2 May 2021

CPI State Executive Member
- Incumbent
- Assumed office 2005

Personal details
- Born: P. Retnakaran; 9 May 1954 (age 72) Mullakkara, Kollam district, Kerala, India
- Party: Communist Party of India
- Spouse: Geetha Raghavan

Mullakkara Retnakaran (born 9 May 1953) is an Indian politician from Kollam, Kerala and former Minister for Agriculture in Kerala. He is the State Executive Member of Communist Party of India CPI, Kerala since 2005. He is a Member in the 14th Kerala Legislative Assembly representing Chadayamangalam constituency in Kollam district since 2006. He is the Chairman of Legislative Committee on Environment, Kerala since 25 January 2019. He served as the Minister of Agriculture in the 12th Legislative assembly of Kerala.

== Political career ==
Mullakkara Retnakaran became a member in Communist Party of India in 1978. He has served as All India Youth Federation (AIYF) State President and Secretary. During his political career, Retnakaran went to jail several times in connection with agitations, including "Job or Jail" strike.

== Personal life ==
Retnakaran is the son of Purushothaman and Sulochana. He was born at Mullakkara, Kollam on 9 May 1954. He lives at Ambalakkara, Kottarakkara, Kollam. He is married to Geetha Raghavan. She retired as the Principal of CP Higher Secondary School, Kuttikkadu, Kadakkal.

== Books ==
1. Samarathanalil (സമരത്തണലിൽ), Published by Prabhath Book House in 2019.
2. Mahabharathathiloode (മഹാഭാരതത്തിലൂടെ), Published by Sankeerthanam Publications in 2020.

== See also ==
- Kerala Council of Ministers
