= Kerala State Civil Supplies Corporation =

Government-owned business in Kochi, India

Kerala State Civil Supplies Corporation Limited

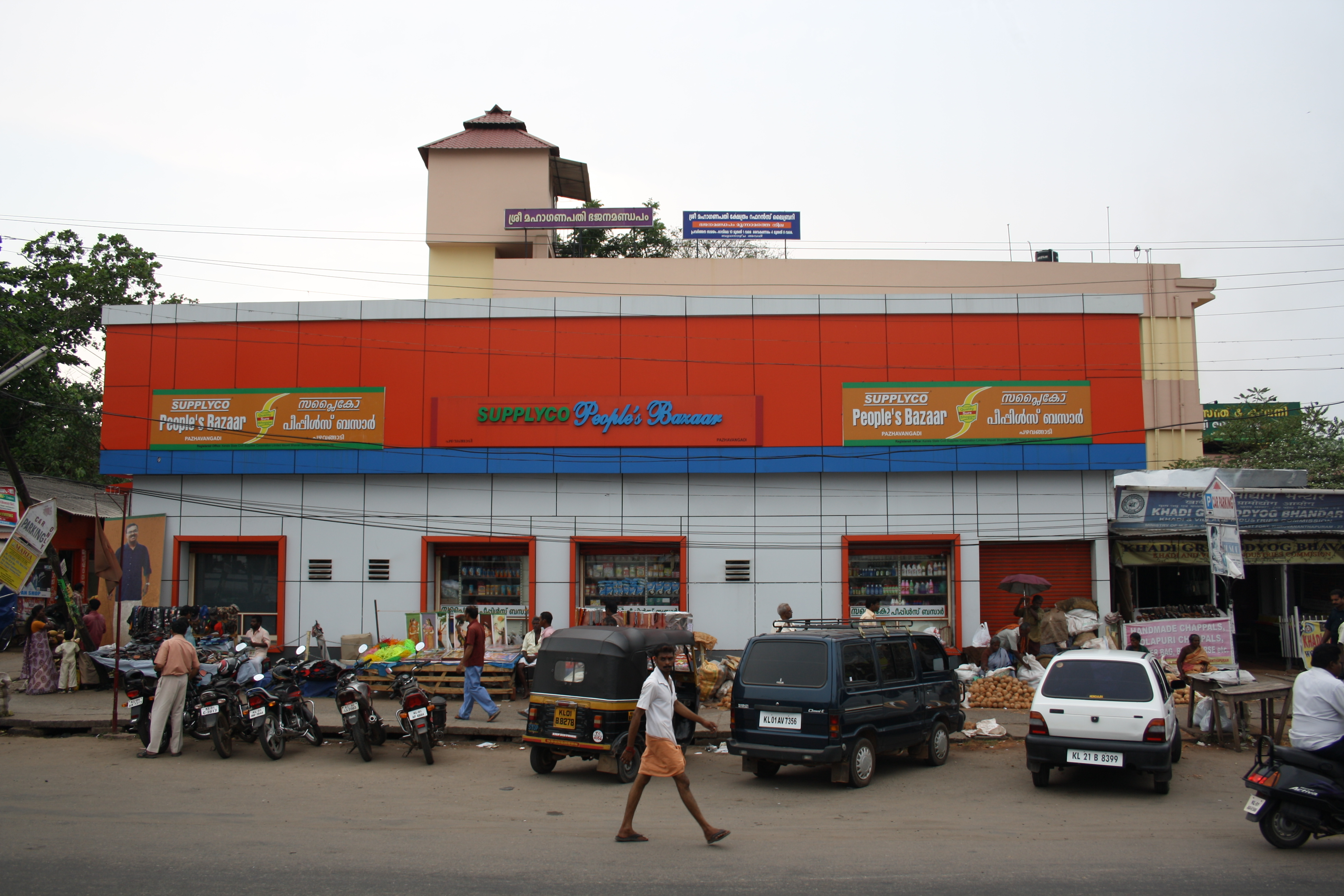
- Abbreviation: Supplyco
- Formation: 1974; 52 years ago
- Type: Governmental organisation
- Headquarters: Maveli Bhavan, Gandhi Nagar, Kochi
- Chairman: P.B Nooh IAS
- Parent organisation: Department of Food, Civil Supplies & Consumer Affairs, Government of Kerala
- Staff: 4500+
- Website: supplycokerala.com

The Kerala State Civil Supplies Corporation Limited, abbreviated as and known better by its brand name Supplyco, is a Government of Kerala-owned company headquartered at Kochi, India. It acts as the execution arm of the Department of Food and Civil Supplies of the Government of Kerala. Founded in 1974, the company serves the purpose of governmental intervention in the retail market to control prices of essential commodities.

The corporation runs a chain of retail supermarkets under the brand name Supplyco, and a chain of general store retail outlets under the name Maveli Stores.

The Kerala State Civil Supplies Corporation Limited, abbreviated as and known better by its brand name “SUPPLYCO” is a Government of Kerala-owned company headquartered at Ernakulam, India. It acts as the execution arm of the Department of Food and Civil Supplies of the Government of Kerala. Founded in 1974, the company serves the purpose of governmental intervention in the retail market to control prices of essential commodities. The corporation runs a chain of retail supermarkets under the brand name Supplyco, and a chain of general store retail outlets under the name Maveli Stores. The Kerala State Civil Supplies Corporation better Known as Supplyco is the gateway for the 30 million people of the State of Kerala, assuring the much needed food security in a substantive style by supplying life's essentials and reaching out to the rural-poor and the urban-rich alike. It was incorporated in 1974 as a fully owned government company, with authorised capital of 150 million, to meet the limited objective of regulating the market price of essential commodities at reasonable prices. The growth of Supplyco over nearly four decades was substantial, and is more expansive than similar organisations in the country. Headquartered in Kochi and operating through five regional offices, 56 taluk depots including 14 district depots, 5 Medical Wholesale Divisions attached to 5 Regional Offices, and around 1600 retail outlets, it has a work force of more than 4500.

== Market intervention ==
The stated purpose of Supplyco was to regulate the rise in prices of essential commodities in the open market. Under the Government programme of market intervention, pulses and spices are purchased and sold to consumers at subsidised prices fixed by the government. The Government of Kerala aids this operation by giving grants every year. The task has been fulfilled through the network of Maveli Stores, which was named to commemorate the saga of Mahabali, legendary king of Kerala. Now the Maveli Stores has become a prominent name among consumers in the state. Supplyco operates through Maveli Stores and Mobile Maveli Stores, covering almost all panchayaths. Quality products and subsidised pricing are the twin advantages, which Supplyco extend to the consumer. Supplyco has also undertaken distribution of pulses, spices and other branded products of Civil Supplies Corporation at subsidised prices, through a network of 2000 selected ration shops.

Supplyco expanded to supermarkets, petrol bunks, liquefied petroleum gas outlets, and pharmacies.

Supplyco also markets its own branded fast-moving consumer goods, including tea, coffee, milled wheat products, curry powders, iodised salt, bottled drinking water, rice products, coconut oil, spices under the brand name Sabari.

== Festival Markets ==
During festival seasons like Onam, Christmas, and Ramzan, when the price of essential commodities and vegetables are highly volatile, Supplyco organises Festival Markets at important cities and other centres.

== Mid-day Meal Programme ==
Under the Mid-Day Meal Programme of the Government, Supplyco distributes food items to 2.34 million schoolchildren, This is one of Supplyco's major operations.

== Other operations ==
Supplyco is the sole distributor of levy sugar to the authorised ration dealers in the state.

It runs 95 medical outlets in the state, which offers an average 15% discount on all medicines, with over a 25% additional discount for Below Poverty Line families.

Supplyco procures paddy directly from farmers at the Minimum Support Price declared by the Government of Kerala. The procured paddy is handed over to contracted rice mills of Supplyco for milling. The resultant rice is distributed through the Public Distribution System in the state.
