= M. M. Naseer =

Indian politician (born 1967)

Member of the Kerala Legislative Assembly
- Incumbent
- Assumed office 2026
- Preceded by: J. Chinchu Rani
- Constituency: Chadayamangalam

Personal details
- Born: 1967 (age 58–59)
- Party: Indian National Congress; United Democratic Front
- Profession: Politician

Muhammed Musthafa Naseer (born 1967) is an Indian politician from Kerala. He is a member of the Kerala Legislative Assembly from Chadayamangalam representing the Indian National Congress as part of the United Democratic Front.

== Early life and education ==
Naseer is the son of Muhammed Musthafa. He is engaged in public service activities and business related to LPG and Indian Oil Corporation. He completed a Bachelor of Arts degree from NSS College, Nilamel, in 1987 and later obtained a Bachelor of Laws degree from Government Law College, Thiruvananthapuram, in 1999.

== Political career ==
Naseer won the Chadayamangalam seat in the 2026 Kerala Legislative Assembly election as a candidate of the Indian National Congress. He received 68,281 votes and defeated J. Chinchu Rani of the Communist Party of India by a margin of 7,486 votes.
