= E. Chandrasekharan Nair =

Indian politician (1928–2017)

Eswara Pillai Chandrasekharan Nair
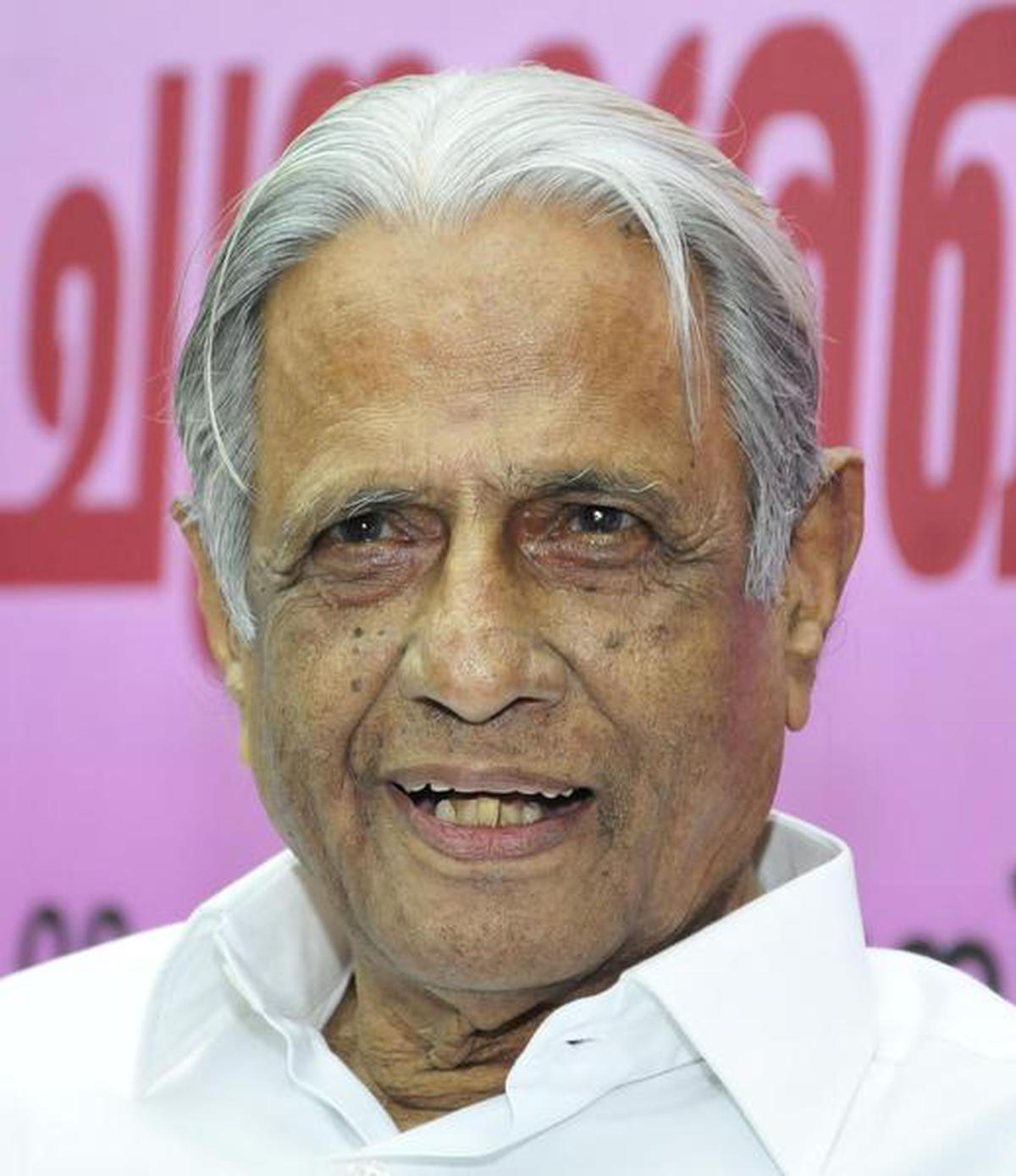

Minister for Food and Civil Supplies Department, Kerala
- In office 25 January 1980 – 20 October 1981
- Preceded by: E. John Jacob
- Succeeded by: U. A. Beeran
- Constituency: Chadayamangalam
- In office 2 April 1987 – 17 June 1991
- Preceded by: U. A. Beeran
- Succeeded by: T.H. Musthafa
- Constituency: Pathanapuram
- In office 20 May 1996 – 13 May 2001
- Preceded by: K. K. Ramachandran
- Succeeded by: G. Karthikeyan

Minister of Law, Kerala
- In office 20 May 1996 – 13 May 2001
- Preceded by: K.M. Mani
- Succeeded by: K.M. Mani

Minister of Tourism, Kerala
- In office 20 May 1996 – 13 May 2001
- Preceded by: Aryadan Muhammed
- Succeeded by: K.V. Thomas
- Constituency: Karunagappally

Personal details
- Born: Idayilazhikathu Eswara Pillai Chandrasekharan Nair; 2 December 1928 Quilon, Travancore (present-day Kollam district, Kerala)
- Died: 29 November 2017 (aged 88) Thiruvananthapuram, Kerala, India
- Party: Communist Party of India
- Spouse: Manorama Nair
- Parent(s): Eswara Pillai; Meenakshi Amma

Eswara Pillai Chandrasekharan Nair (2 December 1928 – 29 November 2017) was an Indian politician, Minister of Kerala and leader of the Communist Party of India. He is known for works in Cooperative sector of Kerala and strengthening Public Distribution System in Kerala through initiatives like Maveli Stores.

== Personal life ==
He was born as the son of Shri. E. Easwara Pillai (a member of Sree Moolam Popular Assembly) and Meenakshi Amma at Kottarakkara, Kollam district in Kerala on 2 December 1928. He was married to Smt. Manorama Nair and they have one son and one daughter.

He graduated in law as part of the first batch of Government Law College, Ernakulam in 1950 and practiced as a lawyer till 1970. In the late 1940s he also worked as a teacher in a school in Kottarakkara.

He died at Sri Chitra Hospital in Thiruvananthapuram on 29 November 2017, after a prolonged illness at the age of 89.

== Political life ==
Having entered active politics at a young age, he had joined Students Congress while at Annamalai University, then joined Indian Socialist Party (ISP) and subsequently the Communist Party in 1952.

A strong advocate of co-operative movement, he had a long association with the co-operative sector, especially in Kollam district. He was the President of Kollam District Co-operative Bank for more than 29 years and was elected as the Chairman of All India State Co-operative Bank Federation and the vice-president of National Co-operative Union and member of the Central Committee of the International Co-operative Alliance and member of Agriculture Credit Board of RBI.

=== Legislative career ===
He was elected to Kerala Legislative Assembly six times from Kollam district as Communist Party of India candidate and served 19 years as an MLA. He was minister in various portfolios and has served various legislative committees.

In 1980, Shri. Chandrasekharan Nair was appointed Chairman of the Ad hoc Committee for the formation of Subject Committees, which recommended the formation of ten Subject Committees for the detailed scrutiny of budget, an innovative concept in the Legislative history of India. The Committee formed under his Chairmanship in 1999 had also given recommendations to streamline the functioning of the Subject Committees, after an in-depth analysis of their working.

==== The stint as legislator with highlights ====
Niyamasabha	Constituency	Tenure	Highlights/Portfolio
1st	Kottarakkara	1957-59	Part of a five-young MLA group called Ginger Group.
3rd	Kottarakkara	1967-70	Resigned on 1 February 1970, to make way for the election of Chief Minister C. Achutha Menon
5th	Chadayamangalam	1977-80	Chairman of the Committee on Private Member's Bills and Resolutions (1977–1979).
6th	Chadayamangalam	1980-82	Minister for Food, & Civil Supplies and Housing from 25 January 1980 to 20 October 1981.
8th	Pathanapuram	1987-91	Minister for Food, & Civil Supplies, Animal Husbandry & Dairy Development from 2 April 1987 to 17 June 1991
10th	Karunagappally	1996-01	Minister for Food, Tourism & Law from 20 May 1996 to 13 May 2001

=== Works and accolades ===
- The concept of "Maveli Stores" aiming at making available essential commodities at fair price to poorer sections of the society, also emerged at his initiative.
- He took the initiative to start a government engineering college in Karunagappalli. As a result, College of Engineering Karunagappally commonly known as CEK, started functioning during the year 1999 under Institute of human resources development for electronics IHRDE (Now IHRD).
- He was also the recipient of many honors such as ‘Sadanandan Award’ for best Co-operator and R. Sankara Narayanan Thampi award for best Parliamentarian.
- He also won Kerala Sahitya Akademi award for the book Hindu Matham Hinduthwam.
- Marakkatha Ormakal, his autobiography/memoir highlights his political life, experiences and societal observations.
- The famous tag line God's Own Country for Tourism in Kerala was launched and Thenmala Eco Tourism Project was started during his stint as Tourism minister.

== See also ==
- E. Rajendran
- R. Balakrishna Pillai
- Thoppil Bhasi
- P. Govinda Pillai
- Veliyam Bharghavan
