= Maveli Stores =

Logo of Maveli Stores

Maveli Stores is a venture of the Kerala State Civil Supplies Corporation (Supplyco).

Under the Government programme of market intervention, pulses and spices are purchased and sold to the consumers at subsidised prices fixed by the Government. The Government of Kerala aids this operation by giving grants every year. The task has been fulfilled through the network of Maveli Stores, which was started to commemorate the saga of Mahabali, legendary king of Kerala. Supplyco operates through Maveli Stores and Mobile Maveli Stores throughout the state covering almost all the panchayaths. It was under Former Food minister E. Chandrasekharan Nair efforts that the Maveli chain of stores was started to control market prices and provide essential goods to the common man at fair prices. Supplyco has also undertaken distribution of pulses and spices and other branded products of Civil Supplies Corporation at subsidised prices, through the network of 2000 selected ration shops.

Supplyco expanded its horizon of activities into other vital areas of consumer interest by starting Super Markets, Petrol Bunks, LPG outlets and Medical Stores (Sabari Medical Stores). Supplyco also markets its own branded products of tea, coffee, milled wheat products, curry products, iodized salt, washing soaps and detergents.

== See also ==
- Supplyco
- Margin Free Market
