= Pangode =

- village
- Location in Kerala, India Pangode (India)
- Coordinates: 8°45′55″N 76°57′49″E
- Country: India
- State: Kerala
- District: Thiruvananthapuram
- Taluka: Nedumangad

Government
  - Body: Gram panchayat

Languages
  - Official: Malayalam, English
- Time zone: UTC+5:30 (IST)
- PIN: 695609
- Telephone code: 0472
- Vehicle registration: KL-16 KL-21
- TRIVANDRUM: Thiruvananthapuram
- Lok Sabha constituency: Attingal
- Kerala Legislative Assembly constituency: Vamanapuram

Pangode is an Indian village and a Grama Panchayat (Indian village council) located in the Thiruvananthapuram district in the state of Kerala. The village is known for its participation in the Indian Independence Movement, through the Kallara-Pangode Struggle. It is situated in the foothills of Western Ghats.

== Location ==
Pangode is a village in the northeastern part of the Thiruvananthapuram district, located 45 km north-east of Thiruvananthapuram city, the capital of the Southern Indian state of Kerala.

There are two other places with the name Pangode. One is located in Thiruvananthapuram city, where there is an Indian military establishment. The other is the location of an Ayurvedic medical college in the neighboring Kollam district.

The Gram Panchayat of Pangode falls under the Vamanapuram block of the Thiruvananthapuram district and is on the Karette-Palode Road. It is a village on the border of the Kollam and Thiruvananthapuram districts. The office of the Gram Panchayat and other important government offices of the Panchayat are located in the village. The Pangode Gram Panchayat was carved out of Grama Panchayats of Kallara and Vamanapuram by Government Order No: 883/77/LA on September 30, 1977. P. A. Rahim was its first President and Pattanikkada Shahul Hameed its first Vice President.

It is spread over an area of 23.31 km^{2}, with a population of 29,039. There are 13,511 males and 15,528 females as of the 2011 census. In the 2001 census, there were 30,225 people, meaning that the population declined by 1,186 people. In the 2001 census, the female to male ratio was 1092:1000. At the time of the census, the village had a literacy rate of over 90 percent.

== Infrastructure ==
There is a government-run lower primary school, and a governmentally-aided upper primary school. The upper primary school is called KVUPS, teaches in both Malayalam and English, and was established in 1964 A government high school is located two kilometres away in the nearby village of Bharathannoor, which is part of the Pangode Grama Panchayat. The governmentally-aided college in the village, the Mannaniya College of Arts and Science, was established in 1995 by the Jamiya Mannaniya Islamiya charitable society. It runs undergraduate courses under the University of Kerala. Dr. Palpu College of Arts and Science, another college in the village, is also affiliated to the University of Kerala.

The village has a police station, a post office with PIN: 695609, a revenue Village Office, an State Bank of India (SBI) branch and a Cooperative Bank.

== Economy ==
Pangode is predominantly an agriculture-dependent village and most of the people are directly or indirectly involved in agriculture for their livelihood. With the spread of rubber cultivations in the 1970s and 1980s in the eastern regions of Kerala, farmers of Pangode quickly switched from cultivating coconut and rice to rubber due to its high return on investment. In the 1990s, a great deal of village youth traveled to countries of the Middle East in search of jobs. Due to this, a number of adults from the village work abroad leading to remittance being a good source of income. The flow of remittance has resulted in increase in the number of concrete buildings, replacing the old thatched and tiled houses.

== History ==
Pangode has a history of participation in Indian Independence Movement. The Civil Disobedience Movement led by Mahatma Gandhi found its ripples in the village and a section of village farmers resorted to tax resistance. They refused to pay taxes for selling commodities at the village markets of Pangode and nearby Kallara in September 1939. A few local progressive thinkers and leaders led this mass movement in defiance of the British Raj and its representative, C. P. Ramaswami Iyer, who was in charge of the Travancore province at the time. A series of events led to an incident in which a charged mob of agitated farmers attacked the Pangode police outpost and killed a policeman. In the ensued crossfire between the police and the agitators, two freedom fighters, Plankeezhil Krishna Pillai and Cheruvalam Kochu Narayanan Achary, were also killed. Soon, the police, under the control of Iyer, cracked down on the movement. People involved in the ambush were arrested and later tried. The first and thirteenth people accused in the case, Kochappi Pillai and Pattalam Krishnan, were hanged to death on 17–18 December 1940 after the High Court confirmed the sentences awarded to them by the Sessions Court. This event, known as the Kallara-Pangode Struggle is declared by the Government of India as one of the 39 struggles that led to India gaining independence in 1947 from the British Raj. The 75th anniversary of the Kallara-Pangode Struggle was celebrated on 29 September 2013, and was led by the Chief Minister of Kerala, Oommen Chandy.

== Transportation ==
Pangode is well connected with the rest of India by road, rail, and air. Direct buses are available frequently to Nedumangadu, Palode, Kadakkal, Kilimanoor, Attingal, and Thiruvananthapuram. The nearest operating centre of the Kerala State Road Transport Corporation (KSRTC) is ten kilometres away in Palode on the Thiruvananthapuram-Sengottai interstate highway. The nearest KSRTC Sub Depot is fifteen kilometres away in Kilimanoor on the Main Centre road (MC Road) that connects Thiruvananthapuram to Kottayam.

The nearest large railway station is in Varkala, which is 35 kilometres away. Other nearby large railway stations are located in Chirayinkeezhu and Thiruvananthapuram. The nearest domestic/international airport is Thiruvananthapuram International Airport, which is located 50 kilometres away.

== Notable people ==
Notable individuals born in Pangode include:

- Ameer Shahul, Writer
