= Kadakkal =

Town in Indian state of Kerala

- Town
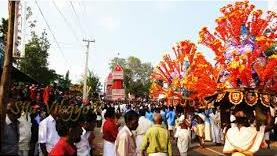
- Kadakkal Thiruvathira - A well-known festival ritual
- Interactive map of Kadakkal
- Coordinates: 8.825695752°N 76.91692471°E
- Country: India
- State: Kerala
- District: Kollam

Government
  - Type: Panchayat raj
  - Body: Kadakkal grama panchayat

Languages
  - Official: Malayalam, English
- Time zone: UTC+5:30 (IST)
- PIN: 691536
- Telephone code: 91-(0)474
- Vehicle registration: KL 82
- Nearest city: Kollam
- Lok Sabha constituency: Kollam

Kadakkal is a town and grama panchayat located in the eastern part of Kollam district, Kerala. It is 44 km away from the cities of Kollam and Thiruvananthapuram. State highway 64 passes through the town. Kadakkal is well known for the social revolutionary activities held in the pre-independent period of India. The town is an important business centre and is known for its Trade (Kadakkal Chantha), Kadakkal Viplavam Kadakkal Riot Case, Festivals (Kadakkal Thiruvathira), Religious unity and spice production. Kadakkal is accessible through Nilamel, and is connected to nearby villages like Anchal, Kilimanoor, Parippally and Madathara.

== History ==
Kadakkal is known for a long time, where one of the notable movements of Indian independence movement took place. Kadakkal Riot Case is listed by the Home Ministry, Government of India as one of the 39 movements that led to India getting freedom from the British Raj. known as the "Kadakkal Riot Case" and was led by Franco Raghavan Pillai.

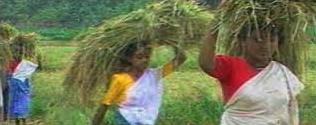
Vayal Koyithu

== Economy ==
Kadakkal town is an important business center. Kadakkal Chantha (Market) is famous, especially for its agrarian commodity business like coconut, areca nut, copra, tapioca, rubber, etc. Kadakkal Grama Panchayat is a Special Grade Panchayat. It spreads over an area of 48.9 km^{2} and has a population of 45291 with 21749 males and 23542 females, according to 2001 census. Pangode, Chithara, Nilamel, Ittiva, Kummil and Chadayamangalam are the neighborhood Panchayats.

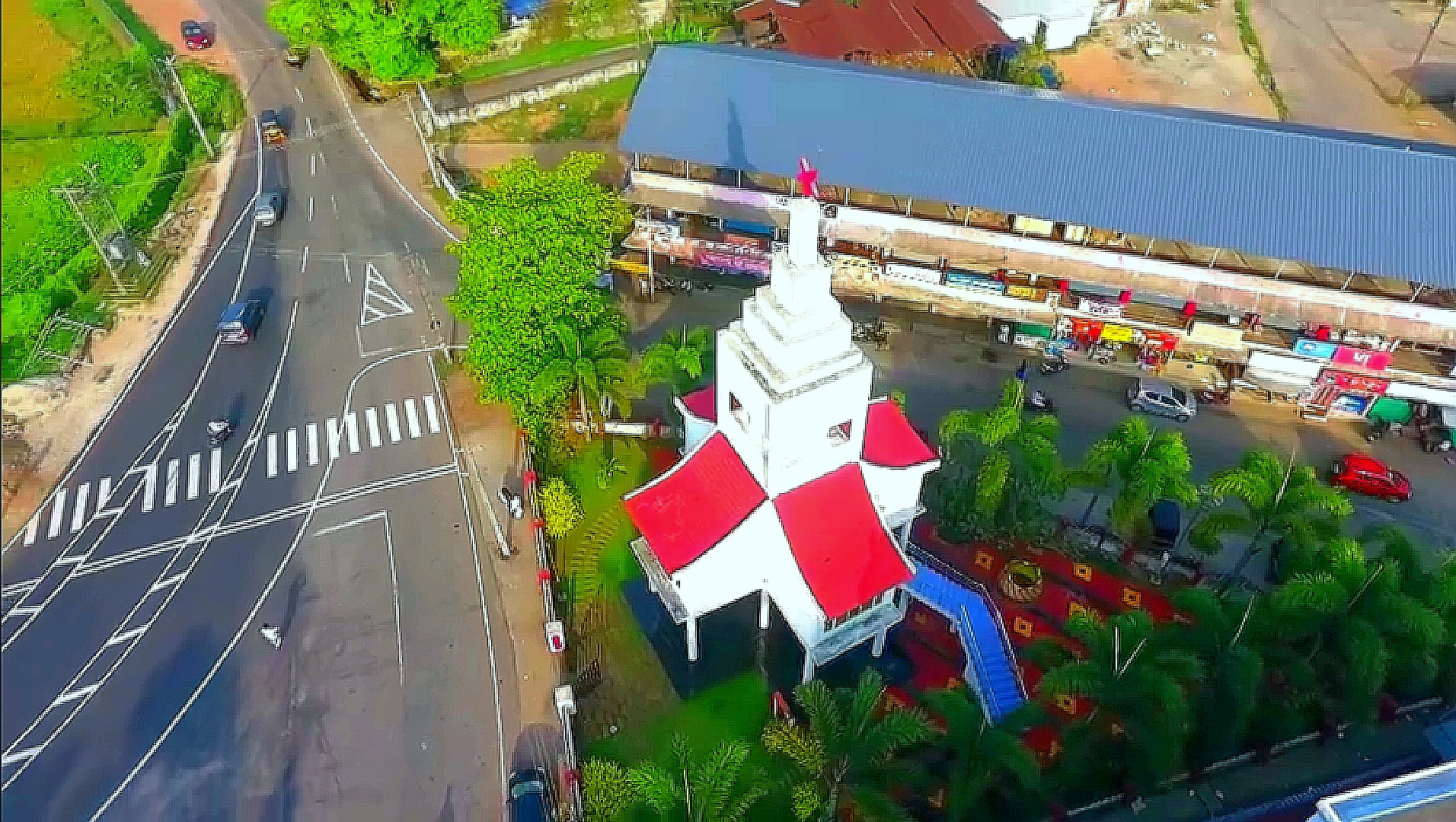
Kadakkal Viplava Smarakkan

== Nearby tourist attractions ==
- Kadakkal Devi Temple
- Kottukal cave Temple
- Jatayu Earth's Center Nature Park
- Varkala Beach
- Palaruvi Falls
- Thenmala Dam

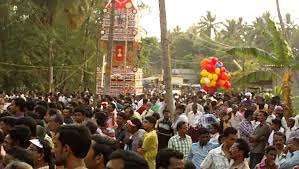
Eduppukuthira

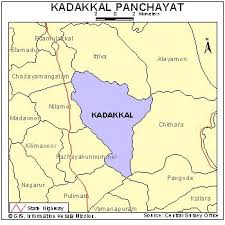
Kadakkal panchayat location

== Education ==
Educational facilities from lower primary schools to professional colleges are present in Kadakkal. The institutions are run by private management and government authorities.

=== Schools ===
- CPHSS, Kuttikkadu, Kadakkal
- Govt. Vocational Higher Secondary School, Kadakkal
- Govt. UP School, Kadakkal
- Govt. Town LP School, Kadakkal
- UP School, Kuttikkadu, Kadakkal
- Nehru Memorial Model School, Attupuram-Kadakkal
- Travancore Devasom Board School, Altharamoodu-Kadakkal
- Murukkumon UPS School, Murukkumon
- National Open School, Kadakkal
- Ex-Service Men's School, Attupuram-Kadakkal
- SN School, Kottapuram-Kadakkal
- Shanthinikethan International Senior Secondary school, Kadakkal
- Mukkada LPS, Mukkada, Thekkil
- A.G.Public School, Swamimukku
- S.M.U.P.S., Thrikkannapuram

=== Colleges ===
- SHM Engineering College, Kadakkal
- PMSA Arts and Science College, Kuttikkadu
- MSM Arabic College, Kadakkal
- GIMS MBA College, Kottappuram
- Jamia BEd College, Chithara
- APRM Teachers Training College, Chithara
- Mannaniya Banath College, Mukkunnam
- Government Industrial Training Institute (ITI), Kummil

== Festival ==
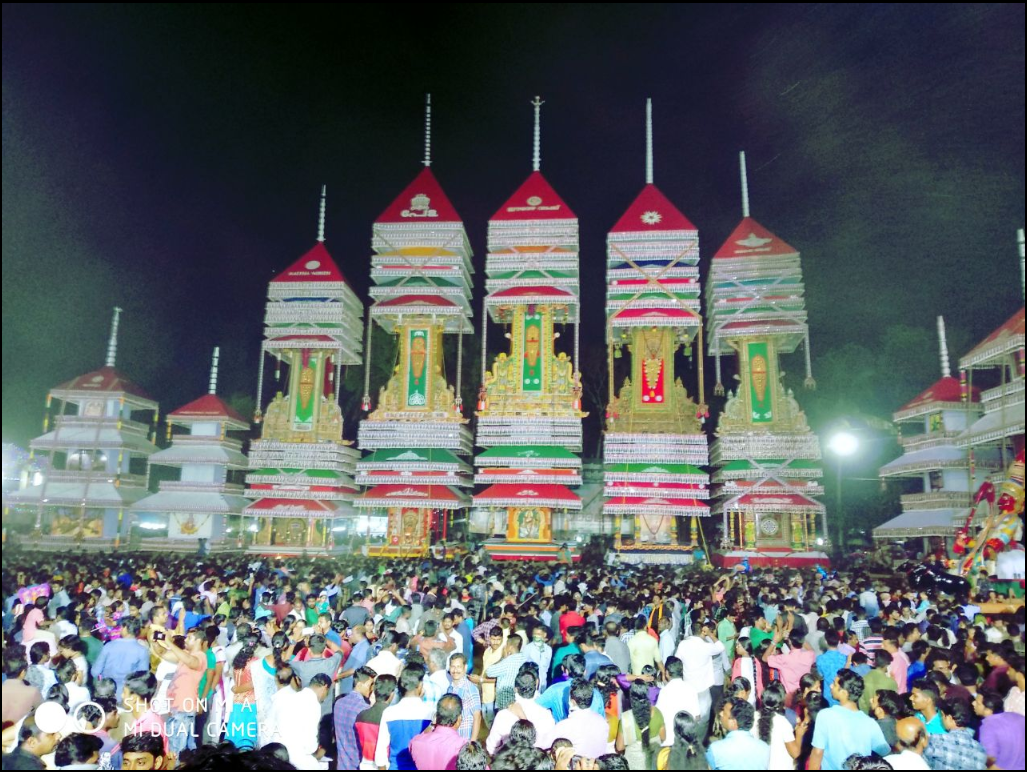
Kadakkal Eduppukuthira

Kadakkal Devi Temple is a famous temple of this region. The uniqueness of the main Devi temple is that there is no idol. The temple is maintained by the Travancore Devaswom Board. The temple is well-known for the Thiruvathira festival celebrated in February or March and is one of the most attractive festivals in Travancore & Kollam area. The temple festivities attract large crowds from various parts of the state. The festival is celebrated over a period of ten days. The main attraction of the festival is Eduppukuthira (Chariot). The deity is known as Kadakkal Amma and is considered very powerful by the devotees. The 10-day "Thiruvathira" festival comes to an end with 'Kuruzi'.

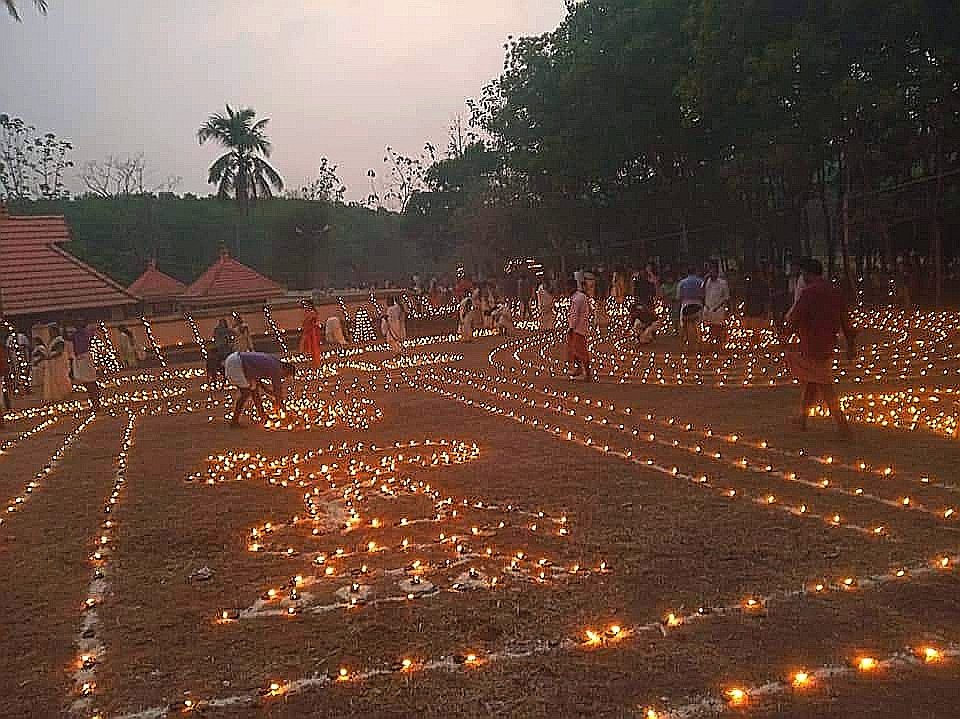
Temple compound during a special occasion

== Transport ==
- Nearest Bus station: Kadakkal Bus Stand
- Nearest Airport: Thiruvananthapuram International Airport(50 km)

== Places of worship ==
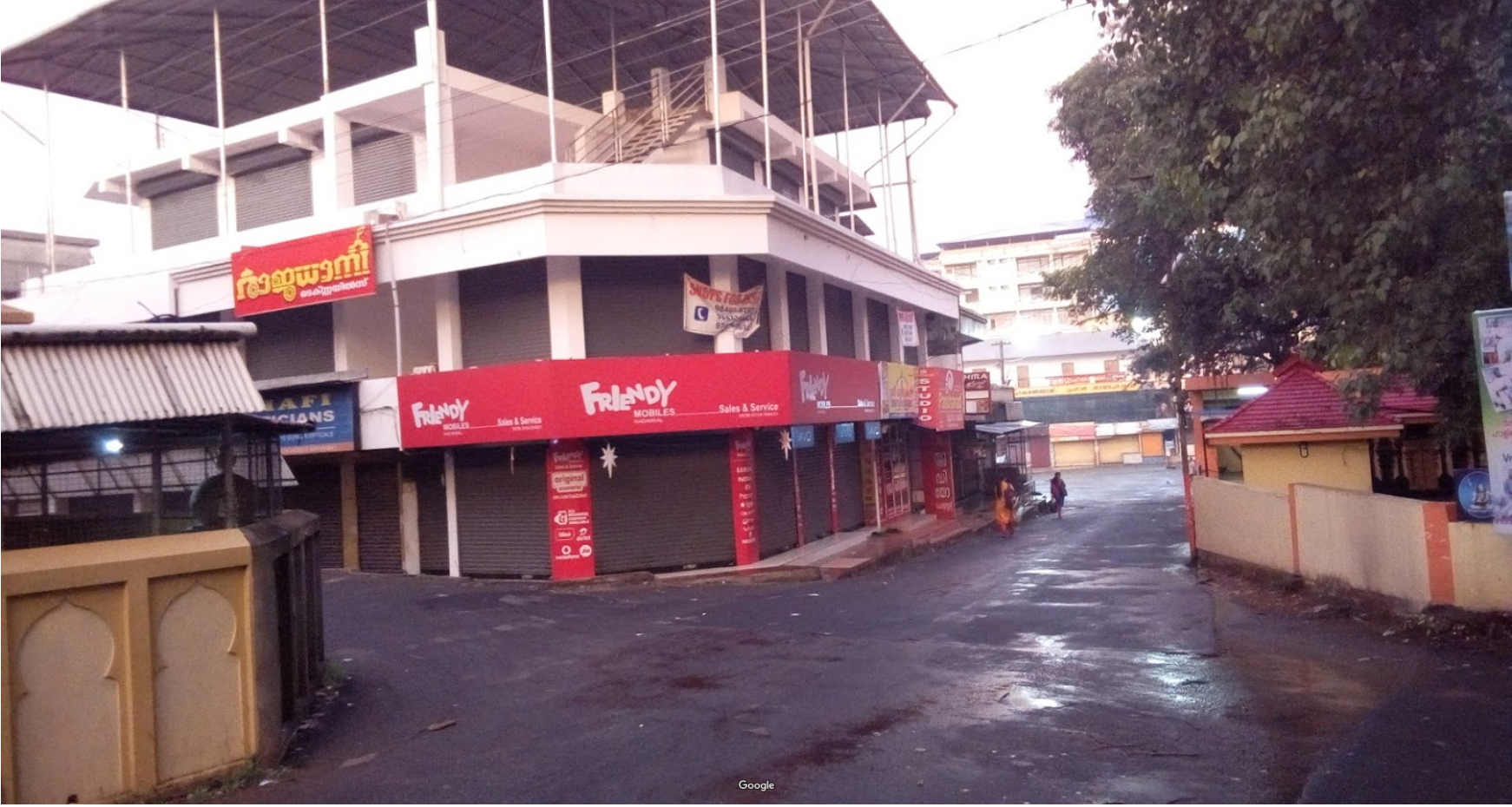
Kdkl. Palliambalam Junction / Post office Junction

- Kadakkal Devi Temple, Altharamoodu
- Kilimarathukavu Temple
- Town Sree Madan Nada Temple, Kadakkal
- Aayiravally Para Temple, Pongumala, Kadakkal
- Thrikkannapuram Sree Mahavishnu Temple
- Arinirathumpara Temple, Altharamoodu
- Kattukulangara Sree Mahavishnu Temple
- Oonnankallu Temple, Kuttikadu
- Thudayannoor Sree Arathakandappan Temple
- Peroottukavu Sree Bhadradevi Temple
- Govindamangalam Sree Mahavishnu Temple
- Thrikkannapuram Church
- Town Juma Masjid, Kadakkal
- Palakkal Sree Chavarukavu Mahadeva Temple
- Thekkil Sree Aayiravilly Mahadeva Temple
- Kadakkal Jumua Masjid, Pallimukku
- Ayirakkuzhy Muslim Jamath
- Peringadu Juma Masjid
- Thekkil Juma Masjid
- Mukkoodu Juma Masjid
- Thrikkannapuram Sree Mahavishnu Temple
- ishakki amman temple
- thevar nada 600 years old temple
