= Kadakkal Devi Temple =

Hindu temple in Kerala, India

Coordinates: 8.83328°N 76.92316°E

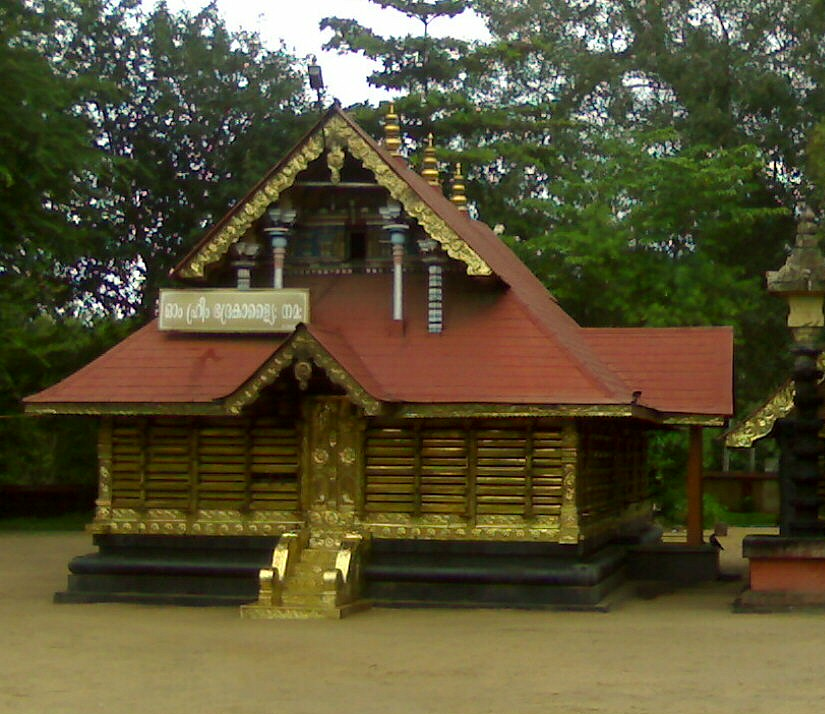

Kadakkal Devi Temple is situated at Kollam District, Kerala, India. Kadakkal village is in the eastern part of Kollam District, Kerala. Kadakkal is well known for the social revolutionary activities held in the pre-independent period of India. Kadakkal is an agriculture village and it is known for its spice production. Main agricultural cultivation include rubber, coconut, tapioca and pepper.

Kadakkal Devi Temple is one of the foremost Devi temples in Kerala. It is renowned for its unique mythology and belief. It is believed that one who worships and offering rituals to Devi (Kadakkalamma) will be protected from evil and their life will be filled with prosperity and wealth.

Kadakkal Temple has four main temples situated equal distances in three directions from the Temple Pond (Kadakkal Chira): Devi Temple, Siva Temple, Taliyil Temple and Kilimarathukavu Temple.

The uniqueness of the main Devi temple is that there is neither an idol nor a pujari. During the temple festival thousands of devotees come to Kadakkal to worship 'Devi'. On the first day of the festival, thousands of women offer Pongal (dish) to the Devi at the temple ground. The festival starts with 'Kuthirayeduppu', which is a grand procession followed by Kuthiyottam and pageants. The festival ends with 'Guruzi', a spiritual ritual.

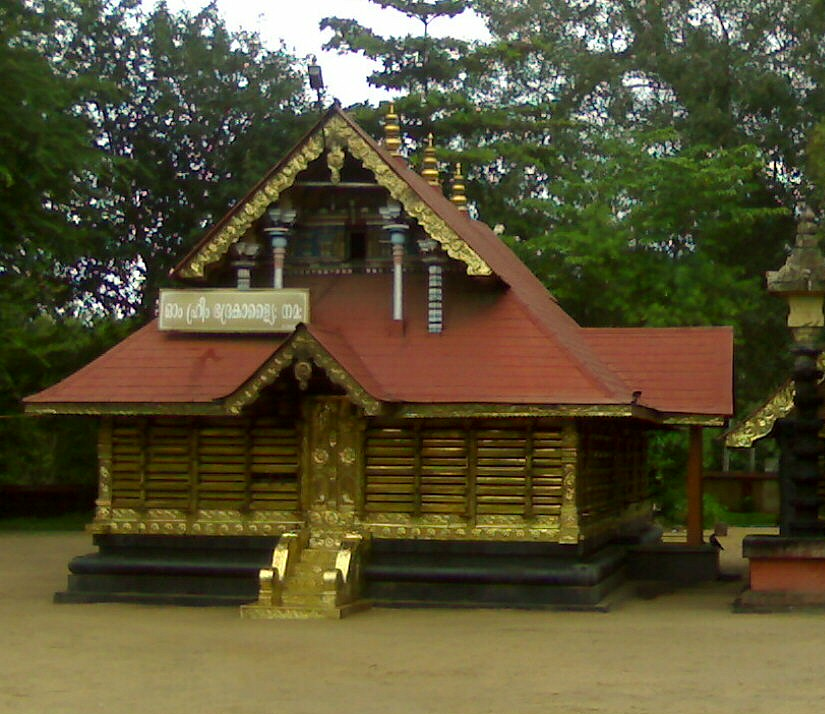
കടയ്ക്കൽ ദേവി ക്ഷേത്രം

== Mythology ==
Kadakkal temple has an unusual mythology related to its existence, that Kadakkal Devi came from Tamil Nadu with her four sisters: Kadakkal Devi situated in Peedika (a small kind of trade shop made of wood), near Kadakkal and Anchal Devi situated, in Kadayattu Kalari near Anchal, Karavalur Devi in the village of Karavalur, and Kariyara Devi at Kariyara. The four temples are called the same name: Peedikayil Bhagavathy Temples.

Another story concerns Panayappan, a Tamil trader who was killed by Kadakkal Devi in revenge for exploiting her family. After that she moved to Kadakkal Peedika, which became the sanctum sanctorum of the present Kadakkal Devi Temple.

The Nettur Kurup, who was the eyewitness of this incident, got permission from the devi to perform pooja to the devi in the Peedika. Every year devotees celebrate the devi's holy birthdate "Thiruvathira" of Kumbha, in the Malayalam Calendar) as their regional festival.

== Festivals of Kadakkal Temple ==
The most important day of Kadakkal Devi Temple is Thiruvathira Nakshathram (star) in the Malayalam month Kumbha, celebrating the holy birthday of the mother goddess "Kadakkal Amma". The important events are listed below:

=== Kadakkal Thiruvathira ===
Thiruvathira's day in Kumbham celebrates the holy birthday of Kadakkal Devi. Kadakkal Thiruvathira, occurring in February or March, attracts a large number of devotees. The festival starts with 'Kuthirayeduppu', a grand procession followed by Kuthiyottam and pageants.

=== Pongala ===
The first day of Thiruvathira, thousands of women offer pongal (dish) to Devi at the temple ground. The pongal ritual starts early morning (around 5.30) on Makayiram (the day before Thiruvathira). Devotees from all over the state come for this particular Pongal festival. Devotees from other districts come and stay near Kadakkal to offer Pongal at early morning. Most of the people stay with relatives or friends. Affordable lodging and accommodation is also available near Kadakkal Temple.

=== Thiru Mudi Ezhunnellathu ===
Thiru Mudi Ezhunnellathu happens once every twelve years. It is a grand procession from Kadakkal Temple to Kalari Temple (Anchal), carrying the holy circlet of Kadakkal Devi (Thirumudi). Tradition says that the sister of Kadakkal Devi is situated in Kalari Temple. The last grand processions happened in 2002 and on 2015 (25 March); the next will occur in 2027.

=== Guruzi ===
The ten-day Thiruvathira festival ends with 'Guruzi', a spiritual ritual that starts at midnight and continues until early morning.

Thousands of devotees gather in the temple on this day to witness this spectacle, which they believe to be the realization and manifestation of Kadakkal Devi (Kadakkal Amma).

== See also ==
- Temples of Kerala
- Kadakkal
- Kadakkal Riot Case
