= U. A. Beeran =

Indian politician

Minister for Food and Civil Supplies, Kerala
- In office 24 May 1982 – 25 March 1987
- Preceded by: E. Chandrasekharan Nair
- Succeeded by: E. Chandrasekharan Nair

Minister for Education, Kerala
- In office 27 April 1977 – 27 October 1978
- Preceded by: C. H. Mohammed Koya
- Succeeded by: C. H. Mohammed Koya

Minister for Social Welfare, Kerala
- In office 27 April 1977 – 27 October 1978

Member of Kerala Legislative Assembly
- In office 1970–1977
- Preceded by: Chakkiri Ahammed Kutty
- Succeeded by: C. H. Mohammed Koya
- Constituency: Malappuram
- In office 1977–1979
- Preceded by: Syed Umar Bafaqi
- Succeeded by: E. Ahamed
- Constituency: Tanur
- In office 1980–1982
- Preceded by: C. H. Mohammed Koya
- Succeeded by: P. K. Kunhalikutty
- Constituency: Malappuram
- In office 1982–1987
- Preceded by: P. T. Kunju Kutty
- Succeeded by: K. Moideen Kutty Haji
- Constituency: Tirur
- In office 1991 – 22 April 1994
- Preceded by: C. P. Kunhalikutty Keyi
- Succeeded by: A. K. Antony
- Constituency: Tirurangadi

Personal details
- Born: 9 March 1925 Kottakkal
- Spouse: A. P. Khadeeja Beevi
- Children: Four sons, two daughters

U. A. Beeran (9 March 1925 – 31 May 2001) was an Indian politician from Kottakkal, Malappuram, Kerala, India. Beeran was affiliated with the Indian Union Muslim League and later joined with the Indian National League. Beeran served as Minister in the Government of Kerala.

== Life ==
U.A. Beeran, was born in Kottakkal, India on 9 March 1925.

After serving in the Indian Army during the 1940s, and later working in a British engineering firm in Bombay in the early 1950s, he joined the Muslim League and became its Kozhikode District Secretary. Beeran eventually became State Secretary. He became elected to the Assembly in 1970, 1977, 1980, 1982 and 1991 as a Muslim League candidate.

Beeran served as the Minister for Education and Social Welfare from 27 January 1978, to 3 November 1978, in the Ministry headed by A.K. Antony. Beeran served again, from 24 May 1982, to 25 March 1987, as the Minister for Food and Civil Supplies in the Ministry headed by K. Karunakaran.

Beeran has served as Director of State Co-Operative Bank, and Chairman of Kerala Fishermen Welfare Corporation. He was also a former Sub-Editor and Asst. Editor of "Chandrika" and writer, authoring "Arab World and Europe" as well as publishing other books and articles. Beeran had also served for sometime as State Executive Member, "All Kerala Sahitya Parishad".

U.A. Beeran died on 31 May 2001. The Kerala Assembly paid homage to him on 5 July 2001.
