= Prayar Gopalakrishnan =

Indian politician (1949–2022)

Member of the Kerala Legislative Assembly
- In office 2001 – 2006
- Preceded by: R. Latha Devi
- Succeeded by: Mullakkara Retnakaran
- Constituency: Chadayamangalam

Personal details
- Born: September 20, 1949 Kollam, Kerala, India
- Died: 4 June 2022 (aged 72)
- Party: Indian National Congress
- Spouse: Sudharma. S
- Children: 3
- Parents: R. Krishnan Nair; J. Meenakshi Amma
- Education: SN College, Kollam
- Occupation: Politician

Prayar Gopalakrishnan (20 September 1949 – 4 June 2022) was an Indian National Congress politician from Kollam, India. He was the president of Travancore Devaswom Board. He was an MLA of Kerala and a member of KPCC.

== Career ==
Prayar began his political career through Kerala Students Union. He was the Kollam district president of KSU and Indian Youth Congress and college union chairman of SN College, Kollam.

He was founder-president of the Kerala State Milk Societies Association, and a long-time chairman of Kerala Co-operative Milk Marketing Federation (Milma) from its inception to 2000. He was instrumental in Milma's growth as a major institution in the cooperative sector. Gopalakrishnan also served as vice president, Indian Dairy Association, and member, National Dairy Development Board.

He was elected to Kerala legislative assembly from Chadayamangalam constituency in 2001.

== Death ==
He died on 4 June 2022 due to heart attack while traveling.
