= Kadakkal Revolt =

The Kadakal Rebellion of 1938 or Kadakkal Revolt was a civil disobedience movement that happened against unfair toll collection in Kadakkal of Thiruvithamcoore in the course of India's struggle. It is a unique event in the history of the princely state of Travancore. The event which started as a mass movement against excess tax or toll collection by authorities eventually culminated in the formation of a parallel administration named Kummil Pakuthi, perhaps the smallest in the world lasting for a short span of eight days. The event is also known as Kadakkal Riot Case and is recognized as an Indian independence movement by Ministry of Home Affairs (India).

The rebellion lasted from 26 September 1938 to 5 October 1938 (Malayalam calendar 1114 Kanni 10 to 18).

== The struggle ==
The farmers in the region relied on Kadakkal market for selling their produce. The market contractor exploited farmers by collecting exorbitant tolls and hence farmers had some complaints regarding collection of toll in the market. It was reported that the toll contractor, Abdul Razak was collecting a sum that was several times the amount that was actually due from the market for the sale of articles. The authorities took no steps to redress these grievances and sided with the contractor. When the civil disobedience movement gathered momentum in the rest of the country the people of Kadakkal commenced the agitation against toll in the market.

On 26 September 1938, few enthusiastic young people who were sympathisers of Travancore State Congress took up the issue and mounted a protest against toll collection. The agitation happened under the leadership of Changuvila Unni, Beedi Velu, Mulakuthoppil Kunju etc. They obstructed collection of marketing tolls and asked people not to pay taxes. When police came in support of the toll collector, the agitators pelted stone at the sole Police outpost in the region. Following this the police forces retreated to Kottarakkara.

=== Thrikkannapuram incident ===
On the morning of 29 September 1938 a police party with two Sub-Inspectors and the magistrate reached Kadakkal from Kottarakkara. When they reached Thrikkannapuram, at a place called Pangalkadu, they saw the crowd about 1,000 strong coming from the east shouting slogans for the state congress. Most of them clad in Khadar and wearing Gandhi caps and carried stones and sticks in their possession. There were violent clashes between police and agitators and crowd over powered the forces. The head constable and the Daffadar got serious injuries. Finding it unsafe to remain there anymore, the Magistrate and his party returned to Kottarakkara.

=== Attack and loot on the police outpost ===
After the Thrikkannapuram clash on the same day the crowd reached Kadakkal at about 10 a.m. on 29 September. The members destroyed the building and furniture and broke open the lockup room. They raided the provisions, documents, records and armoury kept in the safe custody at the outpost. A kitchen shed standing in the same compound was set to fire and destroyed.

=== Parallel administration ===
The only administrative setup that prevailed in the region prior to the rebellion were a police outpost, forest office, postal services and a school. In this police outpost enjoyed a prominence and with the fall of police outpost as a result of agitation the control that Diwan of Travancore had over the area ceased to exist. The leadership of rebellion claimed swaraj in an area of approximately 14 sq. miles around Kadakkal (Kummil Pakuthi) and consider themselves as a state under the leadership of Franco Raghavan as Kadakkal Raja and a Dalit from Kurava community named Chanthiran Kaliyambi as his democratic minister (Janakiya Manthri). This leadership prevailed for eight days and they proclaimed that there was no need for Government officials and Government rule and that everything could be achieved by the co-operation and concerted action of the people. They fortified the area by closing down the school and setting up a camp at Kariath Mission School consisting of 1,000 gun carriers in order to prevent the coming of military forces, preventing the entry of Military, by cutting down trees into the roads and demolishing culverts, etc.

There was another agitation called the Kallara-Pangode Struggle which took place during the same time in the region.

== Government action and aftermath ==
On the ninth day military forces reached the area and they re-captured the liberated Kummil Pakuthy and re-established government control. The village was vandalised and looted by the forces. There were mass killings, arrests and arson. Most of the agitators were arrested in large numbers, and underwent prolonged judicial proceedings and became the victims of torture. A protester named Adoor R Parameswaran Pillai who took part in this revolt was arrested and kept in jail for 141 days before presenting to the court. Five of the arrested victims had become martyrs. Agitators namely Beedi Velu, Ummini Sadanandan, Pangalkadu Narayanan, Mulakuthoppil Kunju died in police custody and Parayattu Vasu died in jail. Kadakkal Raja Raghavan and Janakiya Manthri Kaliyambi were arrested after an year. They were awarded life imprisonment but were released after few years.

A special magistrate court was set up at Kottarakkara for trial. There were 62 accused in the case. Most of them were punished with lifelong imprisonment and forfeited all their properties. The attack on the police station as per the Government was tantamount to an attack against the Government. Hence many were charged with Section 112 of Travancore Penal Code which amounts to waging war against the country. The judgement by magistrate says "Police is the visible symbol of the Government, the conspicuous machinery through which law and order, which is the primary duty of the Government is maintained and that an attack directed against the police and their office is tantamount to an attack against the Government."

== As a national movement ==
Today the Ministry of Home Affairs (India) recognize the movement as an Indian independence movement and has included the struggle under Swatantra Sainik Samman Yojana 1980.

=== Media coverage ===
Changanassery Parameswaran Pillai visited Kadakkal on 11 October 1938 and released a press statement about the occurrences of Kadakkal. In the statement he describes the toils and moils of the people and remarks about the poverty and sufferings of the folks of the locality.

In the whole of Pakuthy more than 80 houses were burnt down.

=== Franco Raghavan ===
Kadakkal rebellion was compared with the fascist Spanish Civil War of 1937. General Franco, a military general of Morocco, brutally overthrew the democratic government of the Second Spanish Republic in 1937. Travancore Government alleged that, Kummil Pakuthy covering an area of 14 square miles, had been emancipated from the rest of Travancore by Puthiya Veettil Raghavan Pillai and his followers. The media and the spokesmen of the government alleged that both the deeds of General Franco and Raghavan Pillai were equal. So, they called Raghavan Pillai "Franco" Raghavan Pillai.

=== Dalit participation ===
The movement had presence of Dalit peasants who were severely affected by the extortive toll collection in the market. There was presence of a Dalit from Kurava community in the leadership of the struggle. The Dalit leader Chanthiran Kaliyambi who was the second in command of the protests was arrested by the government and jailed. He died because of kidney failure.

== See also ==
- Kallara-Pangode Struggle
- Kallumala Samaram

== Sources ==
- Kadakkal Viplavam by Kadakkal N. Gopinathan Pillai.
