= Chithara =

- village
- Location in Kerala, India Chithara (India)
- Coordinates: 8.8024800°N 76.979160°E
- Country: India
- State: Kerala
- District: Kollam

Population (2011)
  - Total: 20,268

Languages
  - Official: Malayalam, English
- Time zone: UTC+5:30 (IST)
- Vehicle registration: KL-24
- Nearest city: Kadakkal

Chithara is a village in Kollam district in the state of Kerala, India.

== Demographics ==
As of 2011 India census, Chithara had a population of 20268 with 9381 males and 10887 females.

== State Government Offices ==
- Chithara, Sub Registrar Office
- KSEB Section Office
- Krishi Bhavan, Chithara
- Chithara Police Station

== Educational Institutions ==
- Apple Kids International School
- Sree Narayana Higher Secondary School - CHITHARA(Paruthy)
- GLPS CHITHARA
- A.P.R.M. Central School
- Almanar LPS Valavupacha
- Govt. Higher Secondary School
- B.Ed. College
- UPS Pezhumoodu
- Mathira L P S
- PALPU COLLEGE MATHIRA
- GUPS THOOTTICKAL MATHIRA
