= Alayamon =

- village
- Location in Kerala, India Alayamon (India)
- Coordinates: 8.8842700°N 76.965280°E
- Country: India
- State: Kerala
- District: Kollam

Government
  - Type: Panchayati raj (India)
  - Body: Gram panchayat

Population (2011)
  - Total: 12,219

Languages
  - Official: Malayalam, English
- Time zone: UTC+5:30 (IST)
- Vehicle registration: KL-

Alayamon is a village in Kollam district in the state of Kerala, India.

== Demographics ==
As of 2011 India census, Alayamon had a population of 12219 with 5734 males and 6485 females.
