= Kallara-Pangode Struggle =

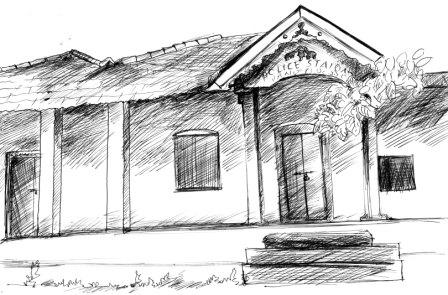
Drawing of Pangode Police Outpost as in 1939

The Kallara-Pangode Struggle is one of the 39 agitations declared by the Government of India as the movements that led to the country gaining independence from the British rule. It is listed alongside some of the most important movements of Indian independence such as Quit India Movement, Khilafat Movement, Malabar Rebellion, the Ghadar Party Movement and Hollwell Revolt Movement by Netaji Subhash Chandra Bose. It is ranked among the 39 most revered movements that were part of Indian Independence Movement and culminated in the British rule ending over Indian territories in 1947.

== Kallara-Pangode ==
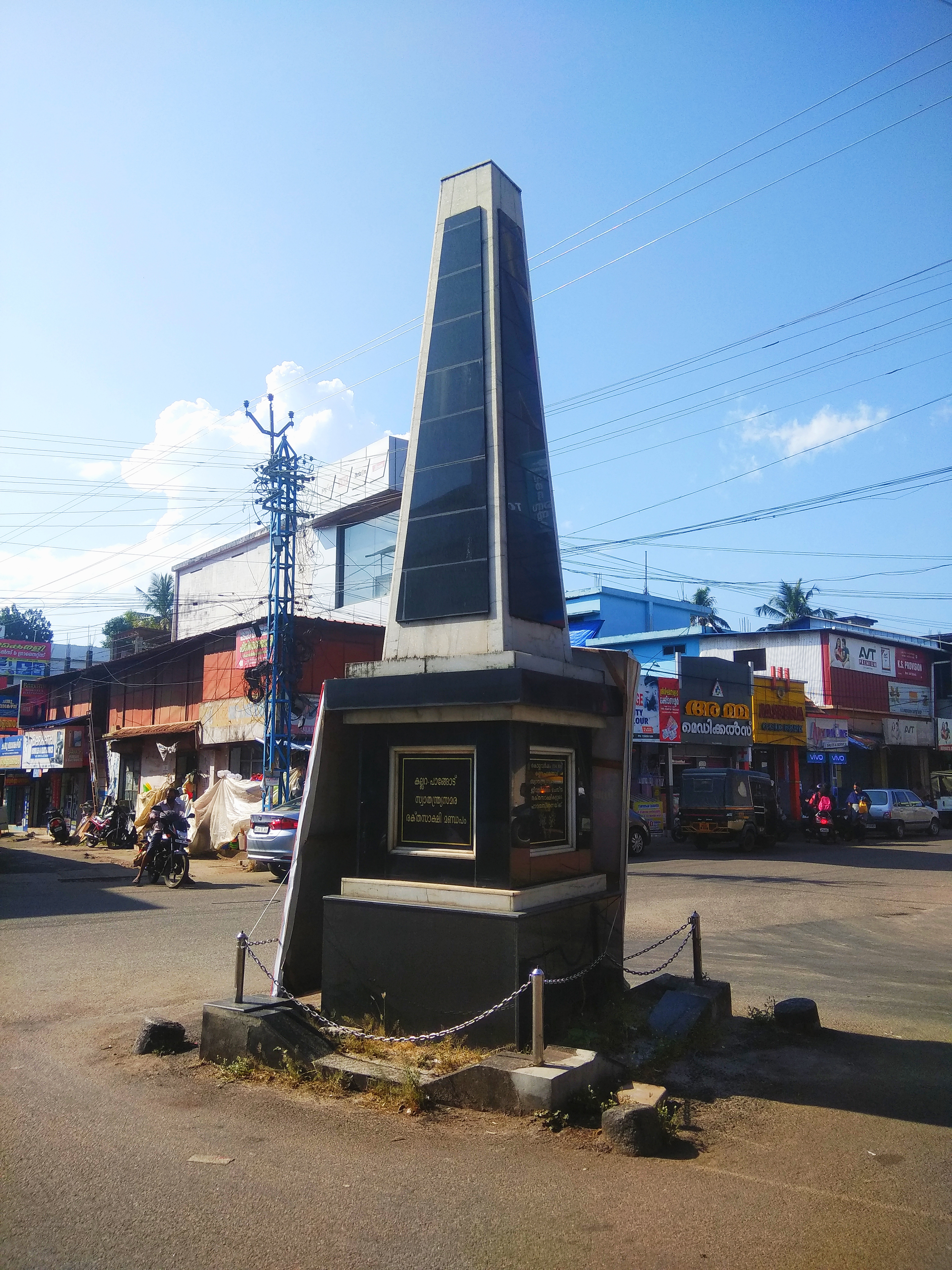
Memorial at Kallara

Pangode and Kallara are adjoining villages 45 km northeast of the capital of Kerala, Thiruvananthapuram. These villages had been in the attention of Travancore Royal Family and later that of the representatives of the British Raj because the area was known for spices such as pepper, ginger, areca nut and betel.

== The Struggle ==
Kallara-Pangode Struggle took place as part of the Civil Disobedience Movement led by Mahatma Gandhi (M K Gandhi). People from the two villages who had moved to Thiruvananthapuram and other cities for education and trade, and people who had been in the Army, brought the messages of Gandhi to the villages in 1930s. This led to the people's desire to have self-rule and the need to get rid of the British Raj. In addition, the oppressive rule of Diwan C. P. Ramaswami Iyer as the representative of the Viceroy of India, had aggravated the situation. Soon after his appointment as the Diwan in 1936, C. P. Ramaswami Iyer’s officers and secret police began enforcing stringent rules.

When the revenue authorities implemented a rule to collect more taxes for selling agricultural commodities in the markets of Kallara and Pangode, farmers began opposing it and implemented self-rule. Initially, the revenue authorities enforced the new entry tax system with the help of police, but soon they found it difficult to handle. People who had been distressed by the oppressive rule of the Diwan joined the agitated farmers and it soon swelled into a large mass movement. Farmers across religions and classes decided not to pay the increased entry tax for selling agricultural produces in the markets.

The farmers under the leadership of Chellappan Vaidyan, Kochappi Pillai, Plankeezhil Krishna Pillai, Cheruvalam Kochu Narayanan Achary and a few others openly defied the revenue authorities and the police in the Kallara Market on 30 September 1938. This led to the detention and custodial torture of the movement leader Kochappi Pillai in the Pangode Police Outpost. Angered by this, agitators grouped and began collecting arms and ammunition to confront the police. They also blocked the access to Pangode from Trivandrum by cutting down trees onto the roads to prevent any police reinforcement reaching the area.

== Confrontation ==
Kochappi Pillai was released the next day following an effective intervention by Pattalam Krishnan, a retired Army servant. The same day, a policeman who was out in Kallara to clear the obstacles erected on the road by the agitators was lynched by an agitated mob. In the afternoon, the agitators marched to the Pangode Police Outpost, with weapons including rifles. They started firing at the Police Outpost with the police returning fire. In the ensued crossfire, two agitators – Plankeezhil Krishna Pillai and Cheruvalam Kochu Narayanan Achary – died on the spot. Police reinforcements reached Pangode a few days later and began searching house by house to locate the leaders of the agitation. The police cracked down on the movement, arresting all participants of the agitation. The case was investigated and tried; sentences awarded within one year.

== Verdict ==
First and 13th accused in the case – Kochappi Pillai and Pattalam Krishnan – were hanged on 17th and 18th December 1940 after the High Court confirmed the sentences awarded by the Sessions Court. A few of the accused were let off and the remaining accused were awarded rigorous imprisonment ranging from two to nine years. One of the accused, Ramelikkonam Padmanabhan, committed suicide when the police surrounded his house.

== Fighters ==
Following is the list of agitators whose names appear in the case records of Kallara-Pangode Struggle, besides the agitators who were either killed in the fight or hanged.

1. Paluvalli Abbas Chattambi
2. Abdul Latheef
3. Madathuvathukkal Shankran Muthalai
4. Manacode Haneefa Labba
5. Driver Vasu
6. Khathakan Gopalan
7. Panachakkodu Jamal Labba
8. Kallara Padmanabha Pillai
9. Madhava Kurup
10. Kochalummoodu Aliyaru Kunju
11. Mohammadali
12. Vavakkutty
13. Kunjan Pillai
14. Paara Naanan
15. Koikkal.G.Narayanan

(List incomplete)

== Memorials ==
The Pangode Police Outpost building which has historical significance because of its role in the agitation is kept intact as a heritage building, adjacent to the new building from where the police station currently functions. A martyr's memorial is at the centre of Kallara, where people from all political beliefs pay homage to the martyrs on days of national importance. The 75th anniversary of the Kallara-Pangode Struggle was celebrated by the villagers on 29 September 2013 and was inaugurated by Kerala Chief Minister Oommen Chandy.
