= E. Rajendran =

Indian politician (1950–2008)

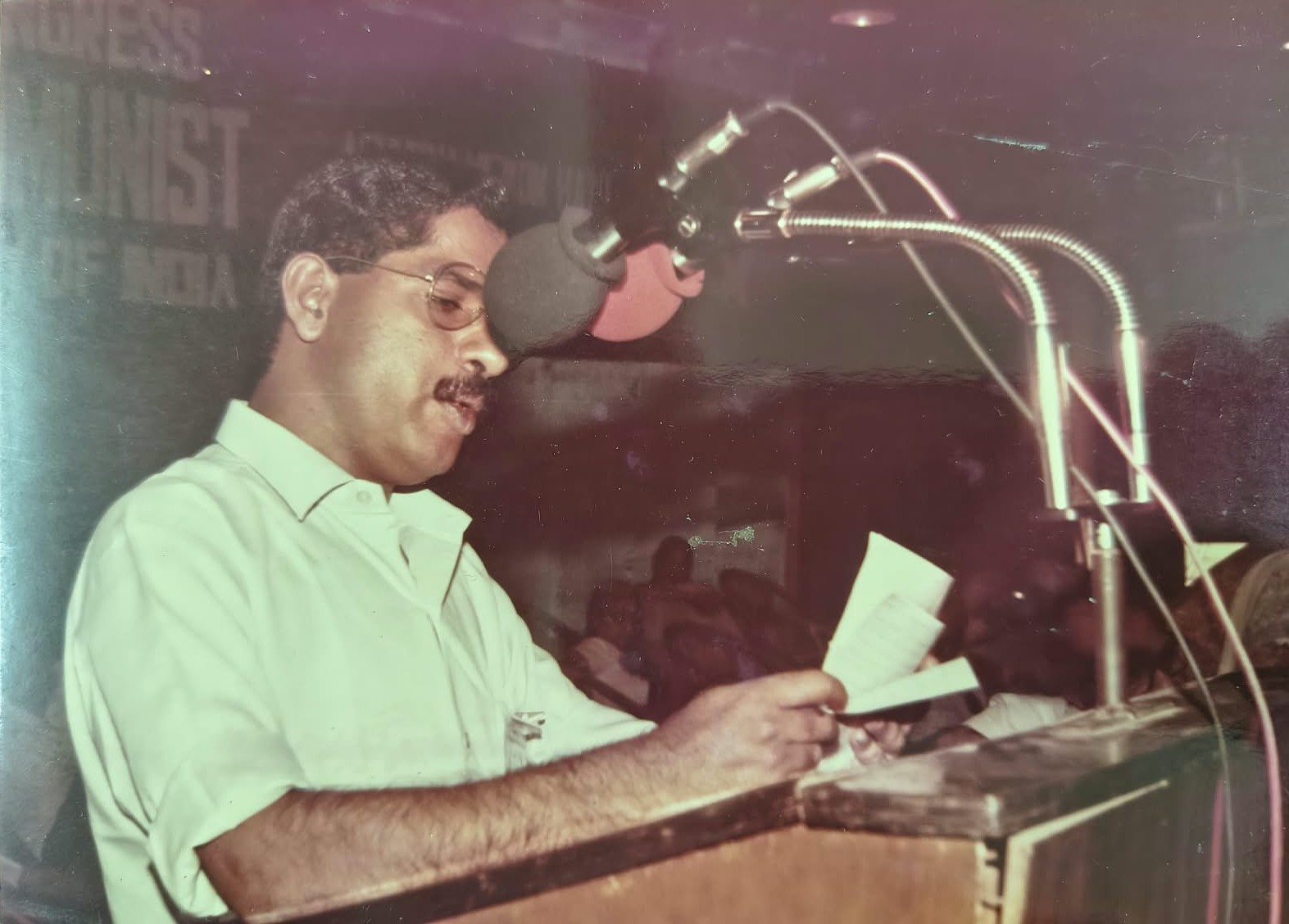
E.Rajendran during CPI Party Congress

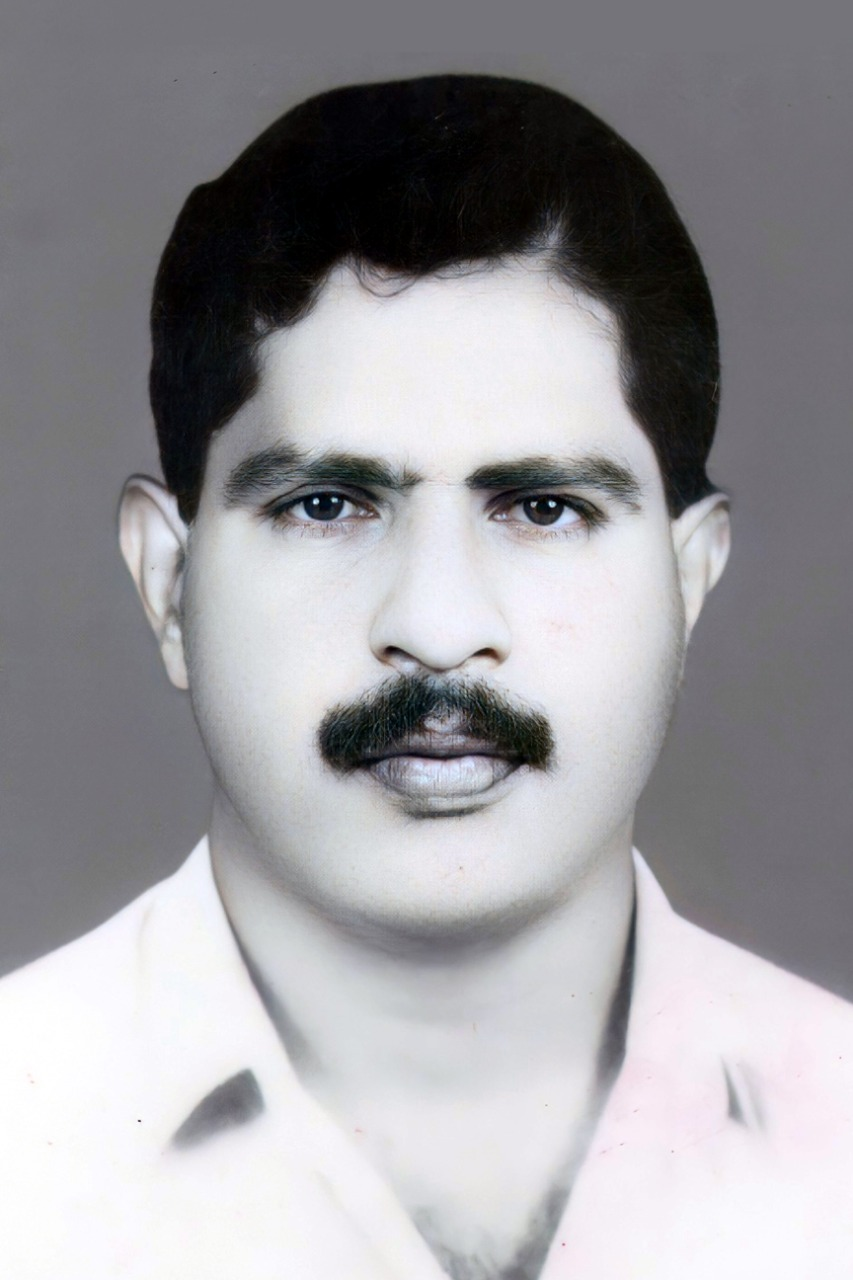
E. Rajendran Ex MLA

Easwara Pillai Rajendran (31 August 1950 – 29 March 2008) was an Indian politician from Kerala, affiliated with the Communist Party of India (CPI). He represented the Chadayamangalam constituency in the 9th Kerala Legislative Assembly (1991–1996). Rajendran was an early leader of the All India Youth Federation (AIYF). He was associated with the cashew workers’ union and the cooperative movement.

== Early life ==
He was born on 31 August 1950 to A. Easwara Pillai, the Founder Manager of AEPMHSS Irumpanangadu in Kollam District and former Member of the Sree Moolam Popular Assembly (known as Sree Moolam Praja Sabha in Malayalam language), and Meenakshi Amma. He grew up in a family engaged in public service and education. He earned his Bachelor’s degree in Chemistry from Fathima Matha National College, Kollam. At age 27, he succeeded his father as the Manager of AEPMHSS Irumpanangadu, a position he held until his death.

As one of the early leaders of the All India Youth Federation (AIYF), he spearheaded the “Thozhil allenkil Jail Samaram” (Job or Jail struggle), over which he was imprisoned. His family had strong political ties. Elder brother E. Chandrasekharan Nair was serving as a senior leader of the Communist Party of India and holding ministerial portfolios in Kerala, including Food and Civil Supplies, Tourism, and Law.

== Political career ==
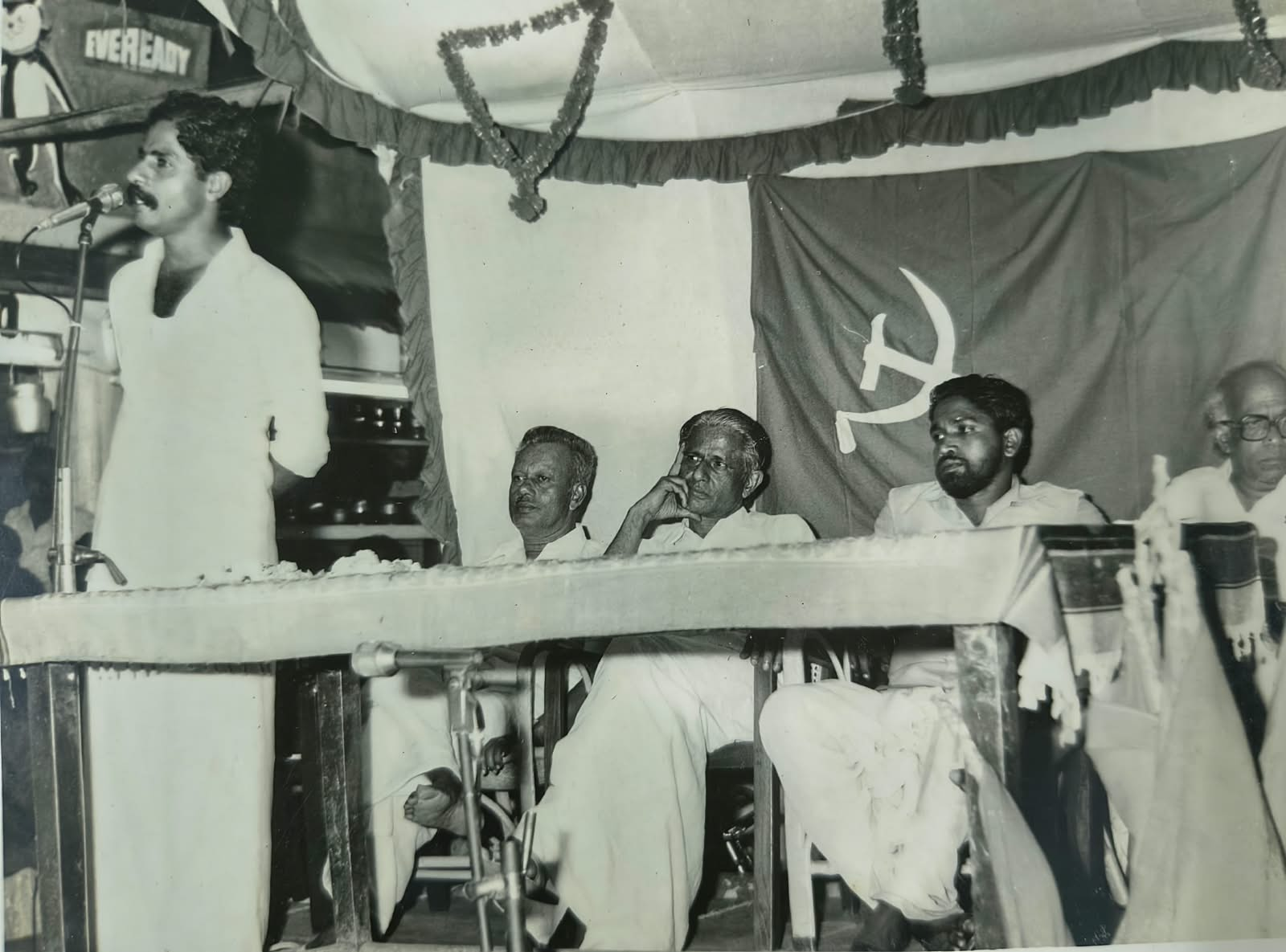
Veterans of CPI- E.Rajendran, K.P. Chandran, E.Chandrasekharan Nair, Jayachandran, Veliyam Bhargavan

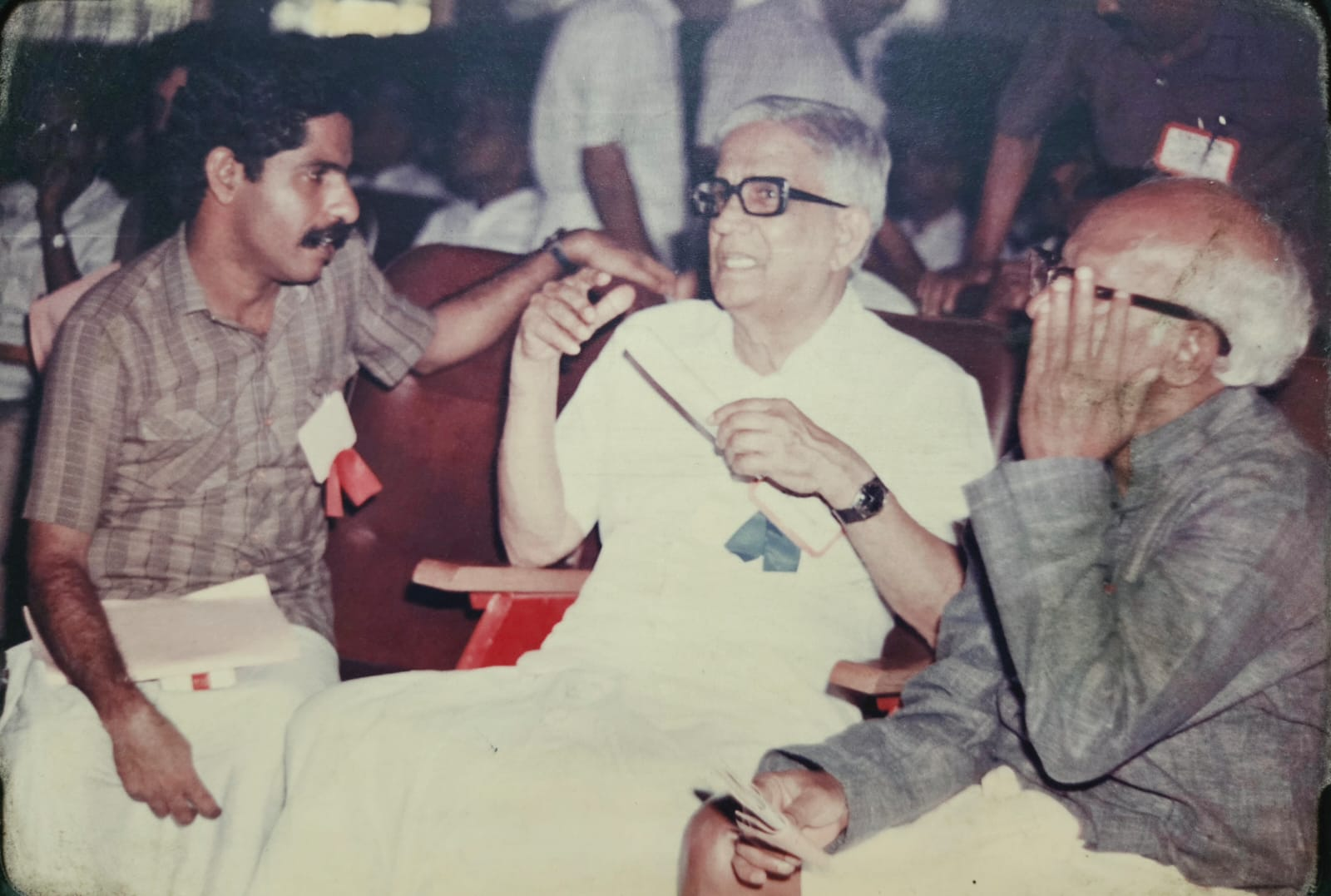
E.Rajendran with C.Achutha Menon and Thoppil Bhasi

From 1991 to 1996, he served as a Member of the Kerala Legislative Assembly, representing the Chadayamangalam constituency as a Communist Party of India (CPI) candidate in the 9th KLA. He served as a Member of the Communist Party of India (CPI) State Council and as the Additional Secretary of the CPI Kollam District Committee, where he helped strengthen the party’s base. From 1977 to 1982, he was the General Secretary of the AIYF Kerala State Committee, leading youth mobilization and political activism during a crucial period. He served as a Government Representative in the Senate of Cochin University of Science and Technology (CUSAT) between 1991 and 1996. He was associated with the cashew workers’ union and the cooperative movement.

== Electoral History ==
- 1987 Kerala Legislative Assembly Election – Runner-up, Kottarakkara constituency (lost by 2,097 votes to R. Balakrishna Pillai).
- 1991 Kerala Legislative Assembly Election – Elected as MLA to the 9th KLA from Chadayamangalam constituency
