= Veliyam Bharghavan =

Indian politician

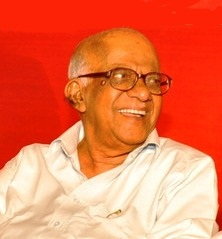
- Veliyam Bharghavan

Secretary of the Communist Party of India Kerala State Council
- In office 1998–2010
- Preceded by: P. K. Vasudevan Nair
- Succeeded by: C. K. Chandrappan

Member of legislative assembly
- In office 1960–1964
- In office 1957–1959
- Preceded by: Established
- Succeeded by: D. D. Potti
- Constituency: Chadayamangalam

Personal details
- Born: Krishnan Bharghavan; 5 May 1928 Veliyam, Kottarakkara Taluk, Kollam, Kerala
- Died: 18 September 2013 (aged 85) Thiruvananthapuram
- Party: Communist Party of India
- Spouse: Suneethi
- Children: One Daughter
- Education: Schooling at Sanskrit school Velyam, and English School Kottarakkara, SN College

Veliyam Bharghavan (May 1928 – 18 September 2013) was a Communist leader from Kerala, India. He was the state Secretary of Communist Party of India (CPI) from 1998 to 2010. In 2010 he retired from that position due to his health issues. He hails from Veliyam village of Kollam district. He was an advocate of a merger between CPI and Communist Party of India (Marxist) (CPM). He was a member of the first Legislative Assembly of Kerala, winning the 1957 and 1960(interim) assembly elections from the Chadayamangalam Constituency. He died on 18 September 2013 aged 85 due to respiratory and cardiac problems.

== See also ==
- Communist Party of India
