= Kummil =

- village
- Location in Kerala, India Kummil (India)
- Coordinates: 8°47′0″N 76°56′0″E
- Country: India
- State: Kerala
- District: Kollam

Government
  - Type: Local Self Government
  - Body: Kummil grama panchayat

Population (2011)
  - Total: 20,383

Languages
  - Official: Malayalam, English
- Time zone: UTC+5:30 (IST)
- Vehicle registration: KL82-

Kummil is a village in Kollam district in the state of Kerala, India.

== Educational organizations ==
- GHSS KUMMIL
- IIT kummil

== Geography ==
The location code or village code of Kummil village is 628427 as per Census 2011 information. Kummil village is located in Kottarakkara taluk of Kollam district in Kerala, India. It is located at a distance of 40 km from the sub-district headquarters Kottarakkara (Tehsildar Office) and 70 km from the district headquarters Kollam. According to 2009 figures, Kummil village is also a gram panchayat. The total geographical area of the village is 1946 hectares. Pincode of Kummil village area is 691536.

== Demographics ==
Kummil has a total population of 20,383 out of which the male population is 9,257 and the female population is 11,126. Kummil village has a literacy rate of 83.23%, of which 84.67% males and 82.03% females are literate. Kummil village has 5,301 houses.
