= Ittiva =

- village
- Location in Kerala, India Ittiva (India)
- Coordinates: 8°51′0″N 76°53′0″E
- Country: India
- State: Kerala
- District: Kollam

Population (2011)
  - Total: 17,270

Languages
  - Official: Malayalam, English
- Time zone: UTC+5:30 (IST)
- Vehicle registration: KL-

Ittiva is a village in Kollam district in the state of Kerala, India.

== Demographics ==
As of 2011 India census, Ittiva had a population of 17270 with 7989 males and 9281 females.
