= Toileting =

Assisting a person with urination or defecation

In health care, toileting is the act of assisting a dependent patient with their elimination needs.

== Methods of toileting ==
Depending on a patient's condition, their toileting needs may need to be met differently. This could be by assisting the patient to walk to a toilet, to a bedside commode chair, onto a bedpan, or to provide a male patient with a urinal. A more dependent or incontinent patient may have their toileting needs met solely through the use of adult diapers. Other options are incontinence pads and urinary catheters.

=== Ambulatory assistance ===
Some patients can walk with assistance from another person, usually a health care worker. Aside from the need for this help, they are capable of meeting their own elimination needs.

=== Bedpan ===
Patients who cannot get out of bed easily but who can control their bladder and bowels are able to request a bedpan. The bedpan is placed underneath the patient, who can urinate or defecate as needed.

Some patients are able to place their own bedpans under themselves, and assistance is required only to empty them after the fact.

=== Urinal ===
A urinal is much like a bedpan but only for a male, the urinal is shaped in a way that the male may use it while still in bed and remain comfortable. The urinal is also often used when input and output (I & O) must be recorded.

=== Briefs ===
Incontinent patients often wear briefs to prevent their trousers from being stained by their elimination. Briefs must be checked and changed frequently.

=== Catheter ===
Catheters, in this sense, are tubes that drain urine from the body. A Foley catheter, used with men and women, is inserted into the bladder. An external catheter is attached to the penis of a male patient. In the US, while Foley catheters can only be applied by a nurse or physician, external catheters can be attached by a certified nurse assistant.

== Collection, measurement, and analysis ==
=== Input and output ===
Input and output (I & O) is the measure of food and fluids that enter and exit the body. Certain patients with the need are placed on I & O, and if so, their urinary output is measured.

With self-toileting patients on I & O, or those who are assisted to a regular toilet or portable commode, a receptacle is placed in the toilet bowl that catches all urine that is put out by the patient. This, in turn, is measured by the nursing staff and recorded prior to its disposal.

If the patient is using a bedpan, the nursing staff member who empties the bedpan measures the urine prior to its disposal.

Urinals usually contain measuring lines providing easy measurement. Urinals are also useful for measuring urine from other sources.

Catheters, which are frequently used when it is necessary to measure a patient's output, often have measuring lines on their bags, but these are not considered to be accurate because the bag is floppy. Urine that is emptied from a catheter must be placed in a level container (such as a urinal) in order to be measured.

=== Bowel movement ===
In many patients, bowel movement is also measured. In some facilities, it is the standard procedure to record bowel movement of all patients.

Bowel movement is generally measured by its size (small, medium, or large), given the amount. Additionally, if a patient has diarrhea, this is recorded.

A patient who has not had a bowel movement in several days is often given laxatives. Patients who independently toilet themselves often do not report bowel movements, thereby leading them to get laxatives when they do not need them.

== See also ==
- Accessible toilet

== Sources ==
- Foundations of Caregiving, published by the American Red Cross
