= Urinal (disambiguation) =

A urinal is a plumbing fixture used for standing urination.

Urinal may also refer to:

- Urinal (health care), a small container to collect or measure urine of patients
- Urinal (film)
- Urinals (band)

== See also ==
- Urinal deodorizer block, a small disinfectant block found in urinals
