= Bedpan =

Toilet device for someone confined to bed

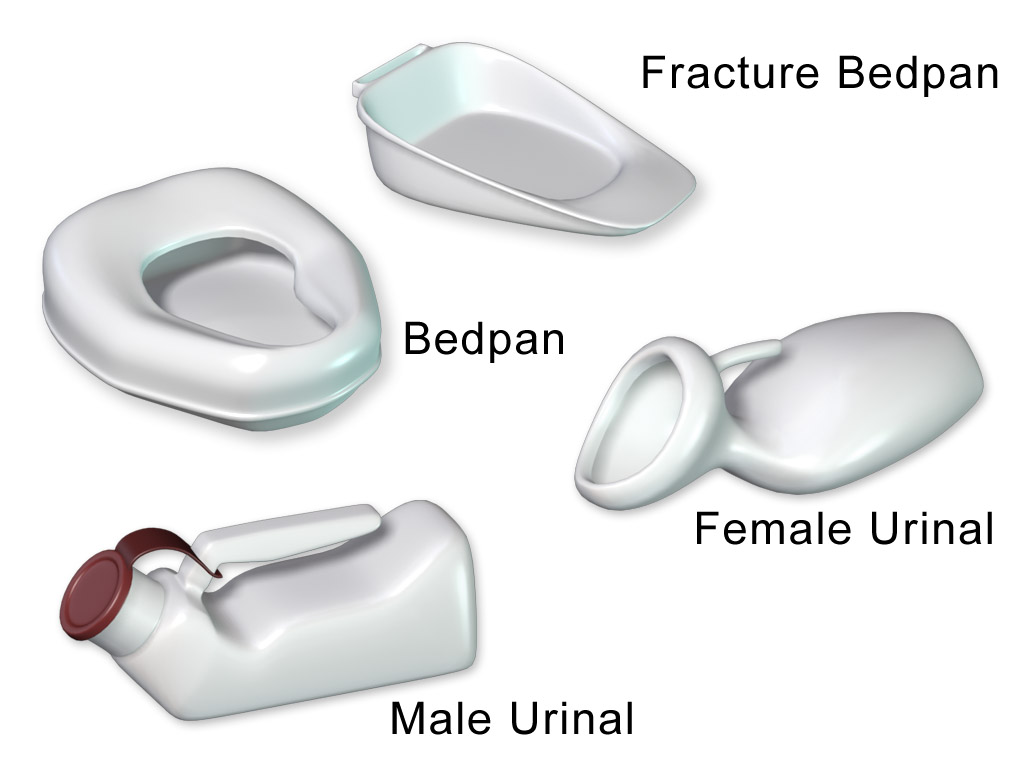
Different types of bedpans

A bedpan or bed pan is a device used as a receptacle for the urine and/or feces of a person who is confined to a bed and therefore not able to use a toilet or chamber pot.

Bedpans can be either reusable or disposable, and include several different types. Reusable bedpans must be emptied, cleaned, and sanitized after each use and allow for urination or defecation while either sitting or lying in bed, as they are placed beneath the buttocks for use. Disposable bedpans are made of recycled and/or biodegradable materials, and are disposed of after a single use. Disposable bedpans or liners rest inside a reusable bedpan, which is needed to support the user's weight during use.

Regular bedpans look similar to a toilet seat and toilet bowl combined, and have the largest capacity. Fracture or slipper bedpans are smaller than standard-size bedpans and have one flat end. These bedpans are designed specifically for people who have had a pelvic fracture or are recovering from a hip replacement. This type of bedpan may be used for those who cannot raise their hips high enough or roll over onto a regular-size bedpan. Bedpans have a weight limit, which is different depending on the material and style of the bedpan. For people who are over those weight limits, a bariatric bedpan can be used, which includes tapered edges for durability.

Bedpans differ from chamber pots in both size and function. Chamber pots are larger and usually have handles and a lid. A bedpan is smaller, since it is placed in the bed and positioned under the person for use. Bedpans can have lids, but most do not, as they are immediately emptied or disposed of after use. Bedpans have a long single handle that can double as a spout, either for urine entry or for emptying after use.

== History ==
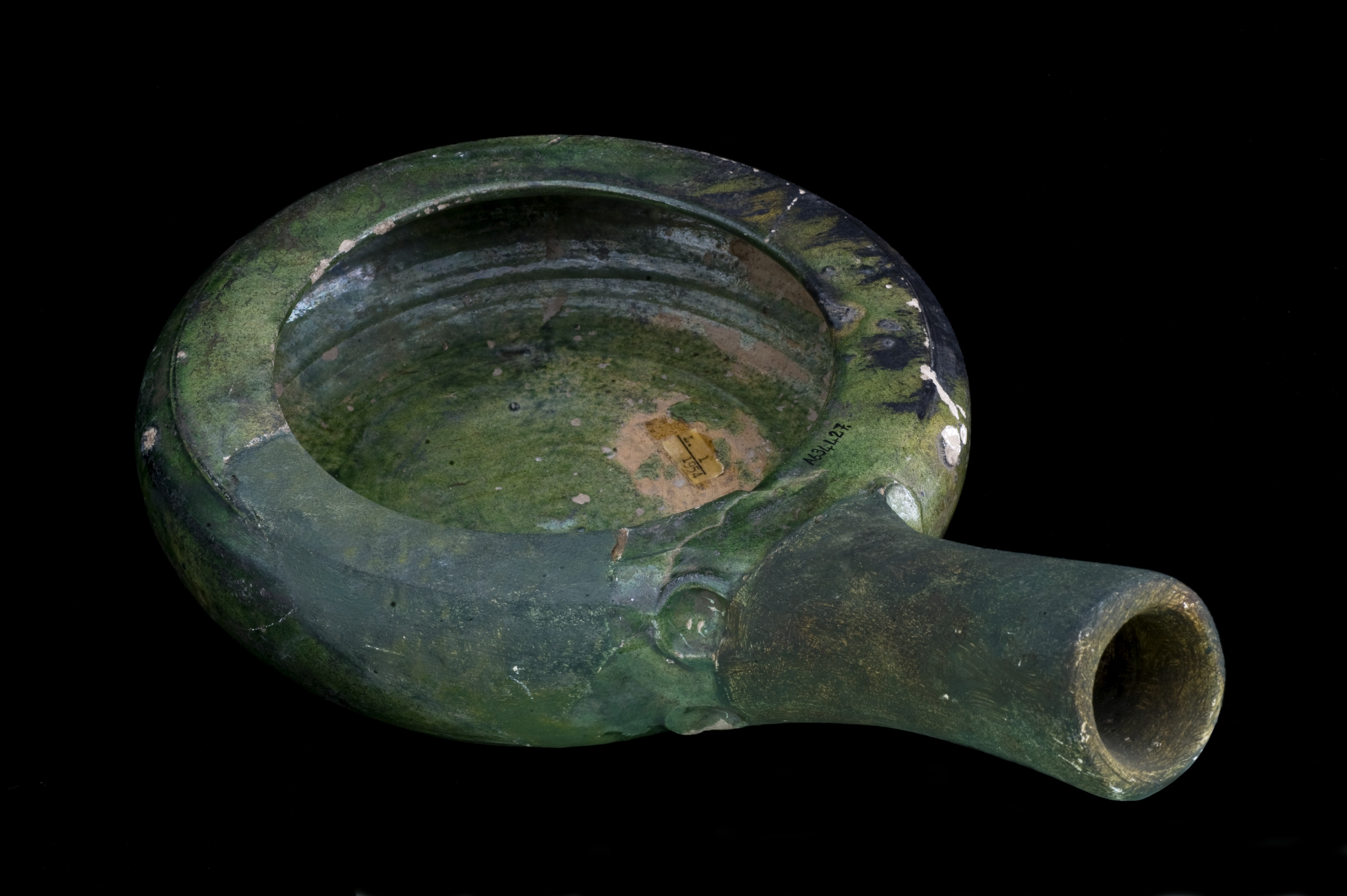
Green glazed earthenware bedpan from the 16th or 17th century

The word bedpan was first seen in the literature of John Higgins in 1572, and one of the oldest known bedpans is on display in the Science Museum of London. It is a green, glazed earthenware bedpan that has been dated to the 16th or 17th century. At that time, bedpans were made from materials including pewter, brass, pottery, glass, and porcelain. Bedpans were not a commonplace item in hospitals until the late 1800s. Florence Nightingale, who worked as a nurse in the United Kingdom from the mid to late 1800s, diagramed death rates and causes for soldiers in military hospitals during the Crimean War and then correlated them to corresponding sanitization procedures. As a result, Nightingale proposed several methods to improve the sanitary conditions in both military and civilian hospitals, including the addition of bedpans in order to reduce infection exposure from urine or feces.

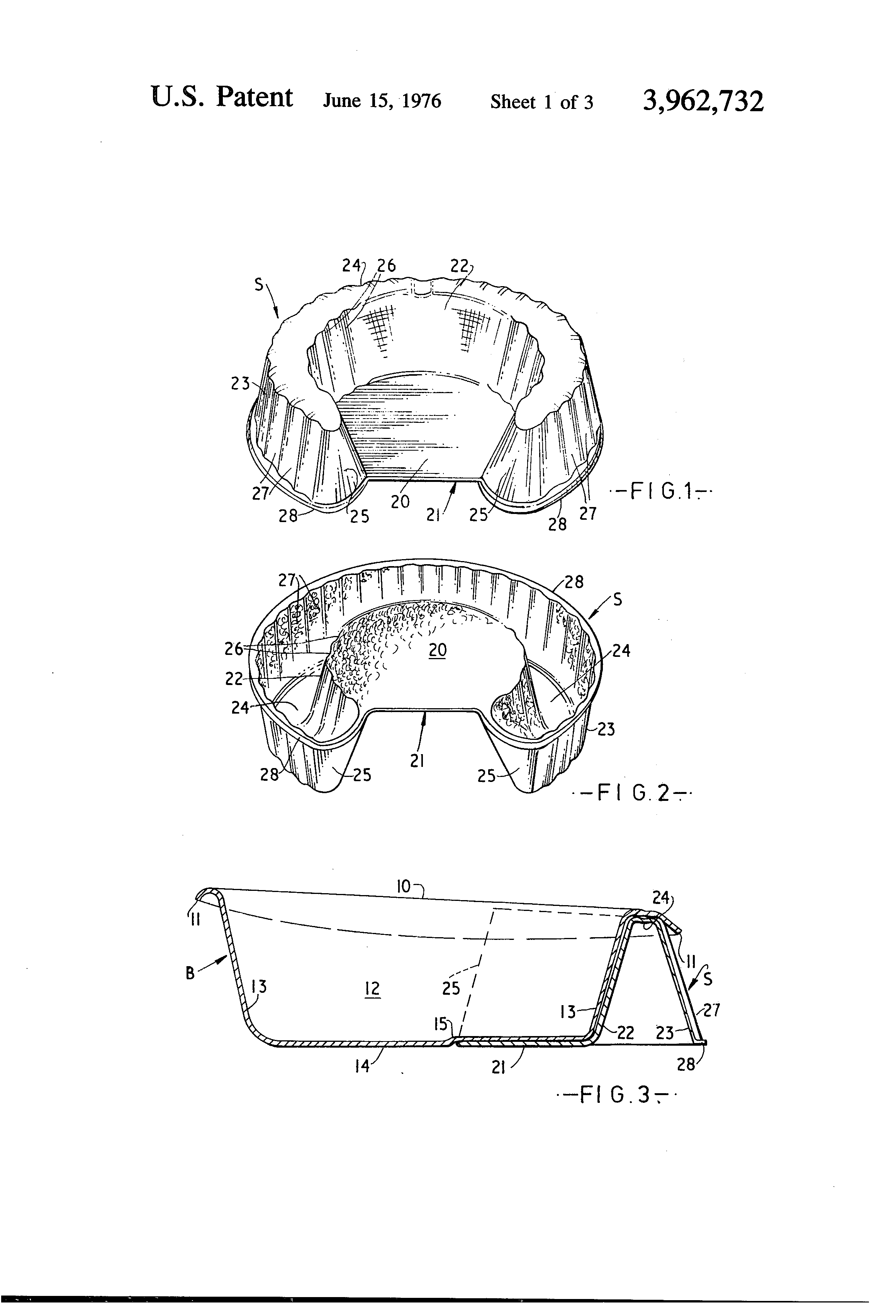
Patent for disposable bedpans, 1976

In the 20th century, bedpans were made of ceramic, enamel, or stainless steel; after the 1960s, bedpan materials expanded to include plastics and disposable substances. The initial bedpan patent US2243791A was created in the United States in the 1940s. Today, most bedpans are made of stainless steel, plastic, or disposable materials. Stainless steel is durable and easy to clean, but it may be cold, hard, and/or uncomfortable to use. Since the 1960s, disposable bedpans or single-use bedpan liners, made from either recycled wood pulp or biodegradable plastics, have become more popular. The first patent for disposable bedpan liners US3962732 was patented in the United States in June 1976 and relied mainly on wood pulp products as the primary material.

In particular, after the introduction and implementation of the Health Technical Memorandum in the United Kingdom in 2007, now renamed Health Technical Memorandum 2030, it became mandatory to sterilize hospital equipment using an autoclave, also known as a steam sterilizer or macerator. This jumpstarted the switch from stainless steel bedpans to pulp-made bedpans within the United Kingdom, mainly because the overall cost of using a macerator outweighed the cost of disposing of pulp materials. Furthermore, in the European Union, pulp products have recently been reclassified as medical devices, beginning in 2021. This means that these products must meet certain requirements and regulations to ensure their safety and efficacy for medical use. By categorizing pulp products as medical devices, the European Union recognizes their importance in healthcare settings due to their crucial role in maintaining hygiene and preventing infection spread. Utilizing disposable bedpans can prevent the spread of infectious diseases by lowering the risk of contamination during handling and disposal of the excretions.

== Use and indication ==
Bedpans are used for toileting for those confined to beds and may be used in a hospital, nursing facility, or at home. There are many reasons someone may be confined to bed, necessitating the use of bedpans. These include permanent or long-term disease states with limited mobility such as Alzheimer's disease, Parkinson's disease, stroke, or dementia. Additionally, individuals may be confined to bed temporarily as a result of a short-term illness, injury or surgery.

Current nursing guidance suggests that bedpans are indicated for immobile patients with the following concerns: fractures, such as hip or lower extremities, profound fatigue, major surgeries, high fall risk, increased injury potential, and obstetrical.

Some downsides to using bedpans include the risk of pressure ulcers, lack of privacy, and the potential to spread infection. Pressure ulcers can be caused by prolonged use and the supporting areas of the bedpan being too small. In order to reduce this risk, ergonomic bedpans have been developed, which support the person with a larger area of less-conductive plastic. There are also designs that completely cover the genitalia during use, offering protection and providing an extra measure of privacy. Some of these ergonomic designs require material that is more difficult to sterilize, and may become a reservoir for microorganisms; there have been improvements in cleaning and sterilization to combat this.

== Cleaning, sterilization, and infection control ==
Managing proper hygiene and the cleaning of bedpans for bedridden individuals is important to reduce the risk of infection. Used bedpans contain bodily fluids and waste and can either be reused through disinfection or disposed of.

Sterilization and disinfection procedures for medical devices are established based on the device category. There are three categories of medical device types, which are generally agreed upon by international governing bodies, including the Center for Disease Control and Prevention (CDC), the Food and Drug Administration (FDA), and the European Centre for Disease Prevention and Control (ECDC). These categories are Critical Use, Semi-Critical Use, and Non-Critical Use. Bedpans are considered Non-Critical use, meaning the recommendation for cleaning is a low or intermediate level disinfectant. For shared equipment, the CDC recommends cleaning and disinfecting before and after each use, and when compatible disinfectants are not available, guidance is to use a washer-disinfector or boiling water. Dedicated equipment cleaning and disinfectant are similar, but with an additional note to accommodate sanitization based on the risk level of the patient. For example, caregivers should wear gloves when emptying bedpans for those on chemotherapy in order to avoid exposure to toxins.

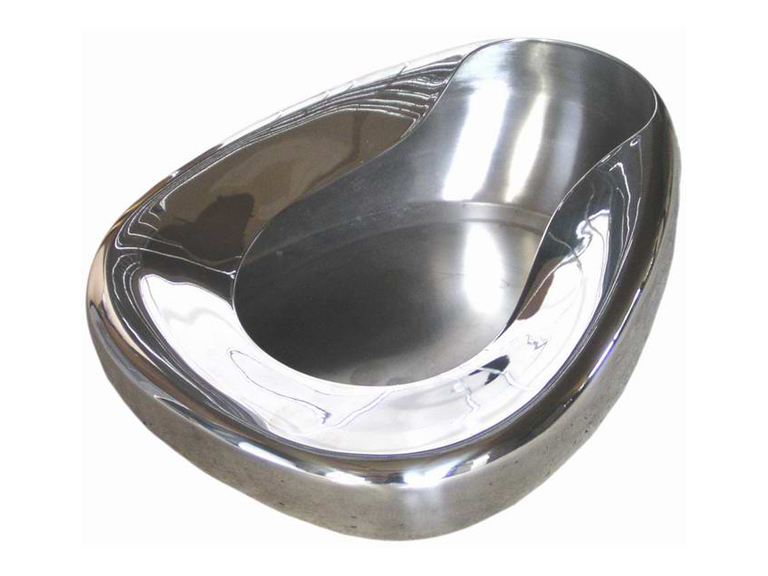
Oval stainless steel pan

Using stainless steel or plastic reusable bedpans poses a risk of spreading infection through caregivers and the environment. Compared to other metals like copper, steel does not have an inherent ability to disinfect. Copper has had some antimicrobial indications dating back to the 19th century, as some copper workers appeared immune to cholera outbreaks or used copper to treat infections or infectious complications. There are a variety of alternative disposal methods to ensure that infection spread is under control, such as bedpan washer disinfector machines and disposable bedpans.

Washer disinfectors have been utilized more recently for the cleaning of reusable bedpans rather than disinfectants, especially due to the risk of cross-contamination with viruses such as SARS-CoV2 or Ebola. Washer disinfectors are instruments used to disinfect used bedpans at high temperatures of at least 80 °C to 85 °C.

Disinfector machines have been shown to be efficacious against common bacterial infections such as C. difficile spores and E. coli when following instructions, which is an alternative to disposable bedpan waste management. This was proven by a trial where commercially available washer disinfectors were evaluated for efficacy and thermal disinfections against C. difficile spores and colonies of E. coli. After one cycle of the washer the bedpan devices were observed for their efficacy in disinfection against C. diff and E. coli by using swabs of the devices shortly after the cycle, microorganisms were eluted and log-kill was calculated. This process showed evidence that the washer disinfector was highly efficacious in against both C. diff spores and E. coli colonies. Not all countries have this technology and may use other methods of disinfecting for reusable bedpans or opt in for disposable bedpans. Reusable bedpans used multiple times after a disinfecting procedure carried out by hospital staff, whereas disposable bedpans are used once and then discarded right after use.

== Global usage of bedpans ==
Bedpan use varies significantly among countries based on social and cultural norms, resources available, and infection control priorities. A recent study estimated that 40 percent of the world's population lacks adequate sanitary toilet facilities. This lack of access to basic sanitation has far reaching effects, leading to the spread of diseases and reducing overall quality of life. This has a correlation with the amount of bedpan usage, whether multi-use or single-use, as well as how they are cleaned. As of 2014, countries such as Denmark, France, Germany, Hong Kong, Indonesia, Mongolia, Norway, Thailand, Tunisia, and Uruguay, had rates of 93%–100% for multiple use bedpans. In other countries, single-use bedpans are more prevalent, such as in Australia, Canada, China, the UK, and the US, with rates varying from 46%–89%. Plastic bedpans are used mostly in the US (93%), Netherlands (100%), France (94%), China (100%), and Tunisia (91%), whereas steel bedpans are mainly used in Germany (91%) and Indonesia (80%). Macerators for single-use bedpans are predominantly used in Australia (73%) and the UK (95%), but not in Canada (48%), the US (7%), China (14%), and Thailand (8%). Bedpan washers use chemical disinfectants mainly in the US, Uruguay, Tunisia, and India, whereas heat is commonly used in Australia, Denmark, the Netherlands, Germany, and Hong Kong. Only 13% of bedpans were fully sterilized worldwide. It was mentioned in Canada (14%), the US (31%), the Netherlands (20%), France (9%), China (20%), Egypt (19%) and Pakistan (18%) that water was used only for manual cleaning. This was the largest study to date on worldwide bedpan usage, with 93 countries participating and providing 1440 total responses.

== Alternatives ==
For individuals who are bedridden or experience urinary incontinence, urinary catheters provide an additional option for getting rid of fluid waste; however, fecal matter may still require the use of a bedpan or other instruments. Indwelling urinary catheters are catheters that can be used for years and, akin to bedpans, come either as a one-time-use drainage bag or as a leg bag that can be cleaned or reused. While there are benefits to catheters, a common complication of long-term catheter use is asymptomatic bacteriuria.

Portable urinals, or urinal bottles, are common instruments used by not only those who are bedridden, but also those who need to get rid of liquid waste. The use of portable urinals has a long history, dating back to the French Renaissance in the 16th century, when surgeons developed the urinals to manage male urinary incontinence. Female urinals do exist; however, they may be less easy to use compared to male urinals since they require a wider opening and this can lead to spillage, especially for bedridden individuals, for whom a bedpan may be better suited.

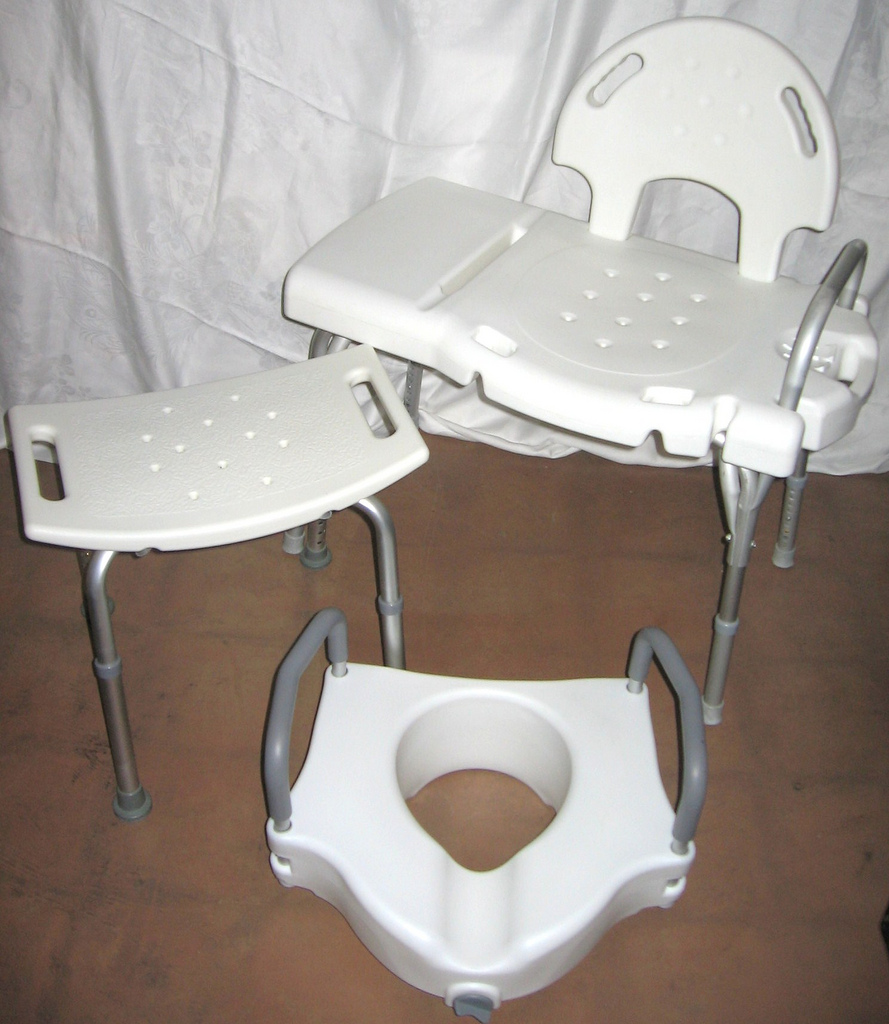
Portable toileting and support tools.

Mobile shower commodes are types of sturdy portable toilets that can be used outside the bed by individuals. For those with spinal cord injuries, shower commodes are a common part of assistive technology to help with bowel movements and bathing routines. Some concerns with shower commodes include long and frequent usage being associated with skin breakdown and the development of pressure ulcers, but additional studies need to be conducted to further address safety concerns.

Old age and multiple comorbidities increase the risk of adults developing urinary incontinence. Absorbent products are designed specifically to absorb or contain urine, and some are even reusable. There are various designs of absorbent products, and some may be better suited for individuals depending on their level of incontinence. Pantyliners, pads, and leakage guards for adults help to manage light to moderate incontinence, whereas undergarments, protective underwear, and adult diapers help to manage moderate to heavy incontinence. Choosing which product to use depends on a variety of different factors, such as gender, cost, and level of dependence on absorbent products, but all such products have an absorbent lining that prevents leakage and odor.

== See also ==
- Chamber pot
- Urinal (health care), used for male patients' urination
