= Tiger with a Tortoise =

1862 by Eugène Delacroix

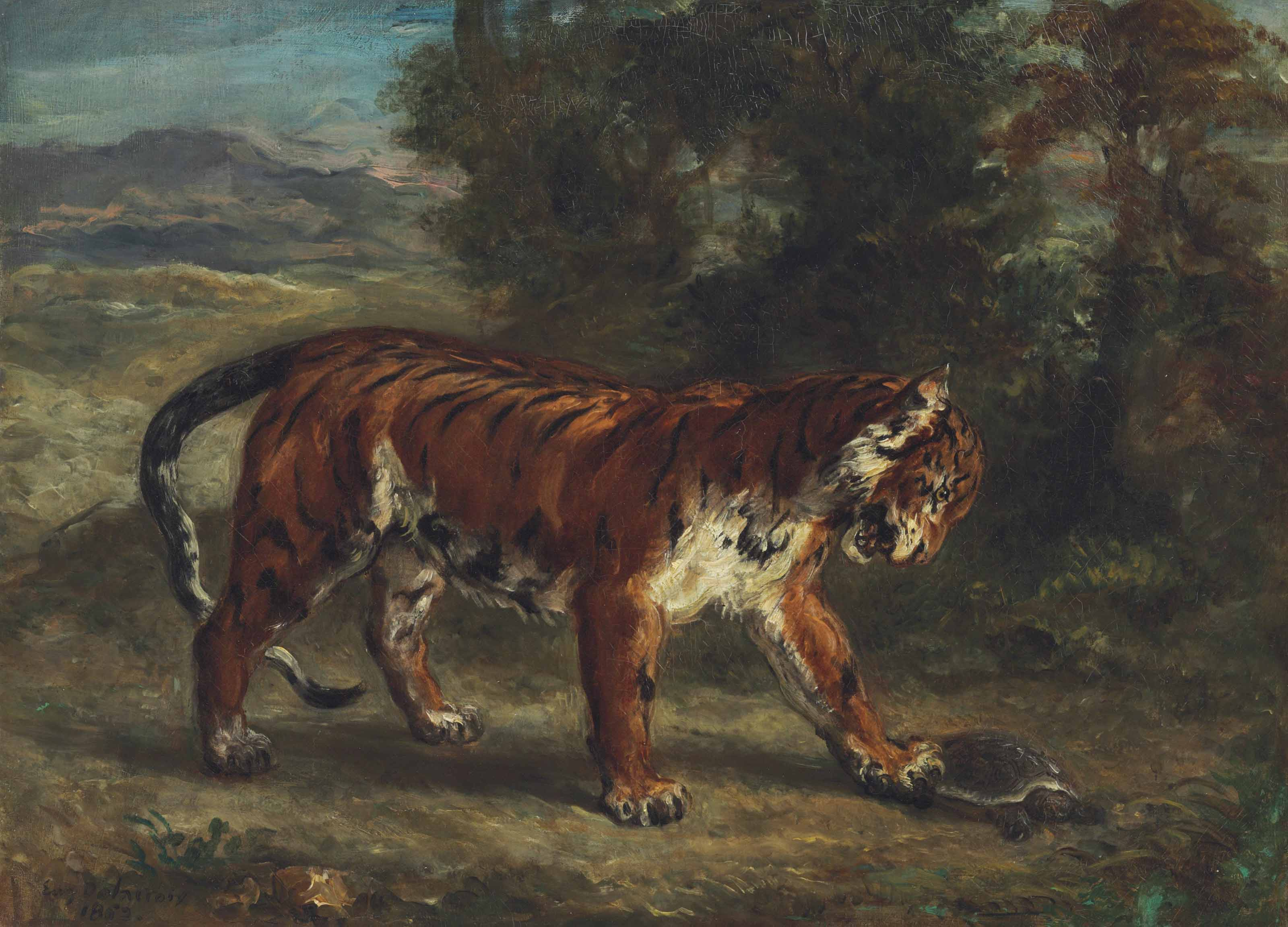
Tiger with a Tortoise (1862) by Eugène Delacroix

Tiger with a Tortoise or Tiger Playing with a Tortoise is an 1862 oil-on-canvas painting by the French Romantic artist Eugène Delacroix. It was sold by Christie's in New York for $9,875,000 in May 2018.
