= A Young Tiger Playing with Its Mother =

1830–1831 painting by Eugène Delacroix

A Young Tiger Playing with its Mother
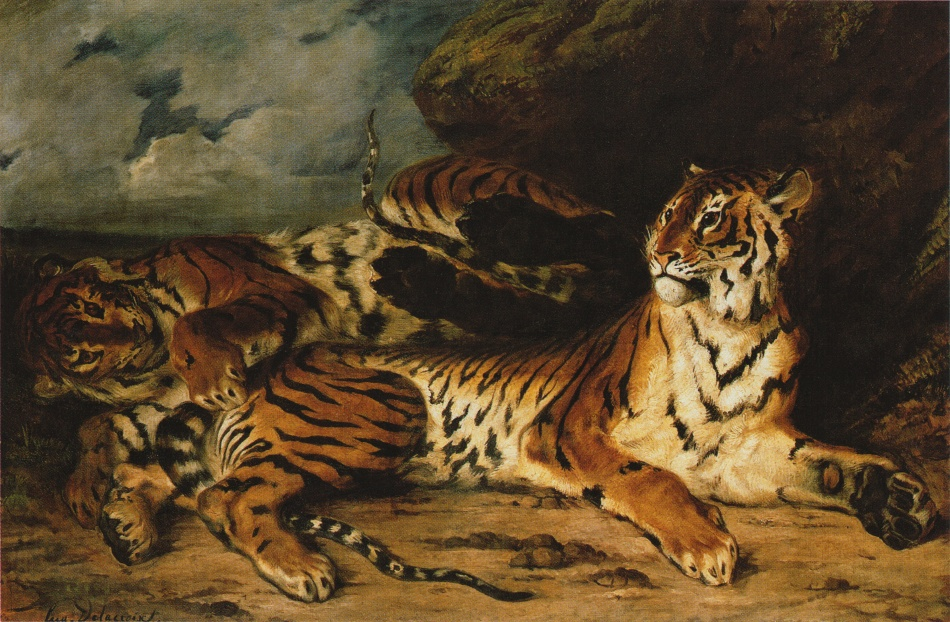
- Artist: Eugène Delacroix
- Year: 1830–1831
- Medium: Oil on canvas
- Dimensions: 131 cm × 194.5 cm (52 in × 76.6 in)
- Location: Louvre Museum; Paris

A Young Tiger Playing with its Mother is an 1830–1831 painting by French artist Eugène Delacroix depicting two enormous tigers "playing" with each other. Painted early in his career, it shows how the artist was attracted to animal subjects in this period. The painting was exhibited at the Salon of 1831, and archives of Delacroix's will executor, Achille Piron, revealed that the painter had paid 1,200 francs to insure it. It belonged to M. Maurice Cottier and now is on display at Room 77 of the Louvre in Paris.

== Influence and analysis ==
Sweetly, the young background tiger slopes in his mother in the foreground, both running into rocks and under a cloudy sky. Some authors have written that Delacroix's animal paintings were made using his pet cat as a model. And although it seems that the painting inspiration is due to one of his visits to the Jardin des Plantes zoo to see the tigers play with his friend Antoine-Louis Barye (an animal sculptor), Delacroix was always more content to observe his own cat.

The piece was in some way influenced by Rubens and starkly contrasts with Delacroix's violent Tiger Hunt, though both (and other Delacroix paintings in this subject) capture the ferocity and tenderness that these animals are capable of: two different works showing a duality of behavior. Tigers and great cats are frequent motifs in Eugène's works (see the following section).

These paintings, along with A Young Tiger Playing with its Mother, can be interpreted as a form of the artist displaying human emotions and passions personified as tame and fierce animals. For example, Delacroix wrote in his Journal of the time: "Men are tigers and wolves driven to destroy one another". His friend Théophile Gautier saw a resemblance between his manner and those of these great cats that he painted, writing: "His tawny eyes, with their feline expression, his slender lips stretched tight over magnificent teeth, his firm jaw line emphasised by strong cheekbones... gave his features an untamed, a strange, exotic, almost alarming beauty."

In French, the picture is called Jeune tigre jouant avec sa mère. Its fierce but also divinely serene animals represent the "delight in wildness" with which Romantic artists like Delacroix were fascinated. Delacroix's interest in wildlife reached its peak with Ovid among the Scythians (1859), which depicts a scene of human barbarians and their animals. His painting of the mother and son tigers is a significant piece in his catalogue and for the time, as Lee Johnson explained:

"A Young Tiger Playing with its Mother, Delacroix's largest animal painting to date, is shown at an exhibition in the Palais du Luxembourg for the benefit of citizens wounded in the July Revolution."

== Other paintings with similar themes ==
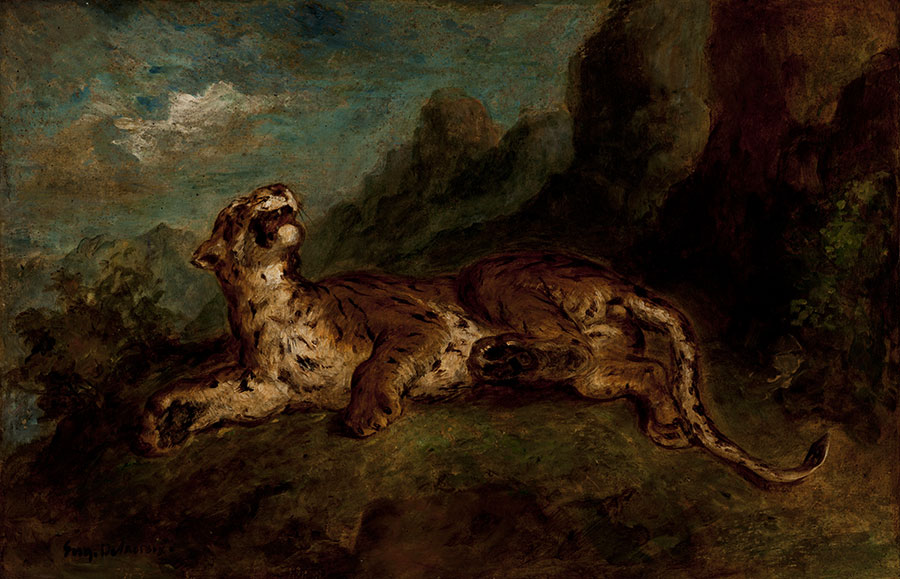
Tiger, 36 × 53 cm

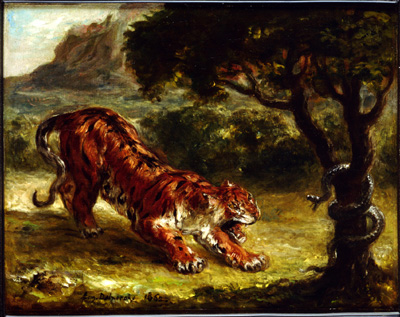
Tiger and Snake. Oil on canvas, 13 × 16 1/4 in, 1862

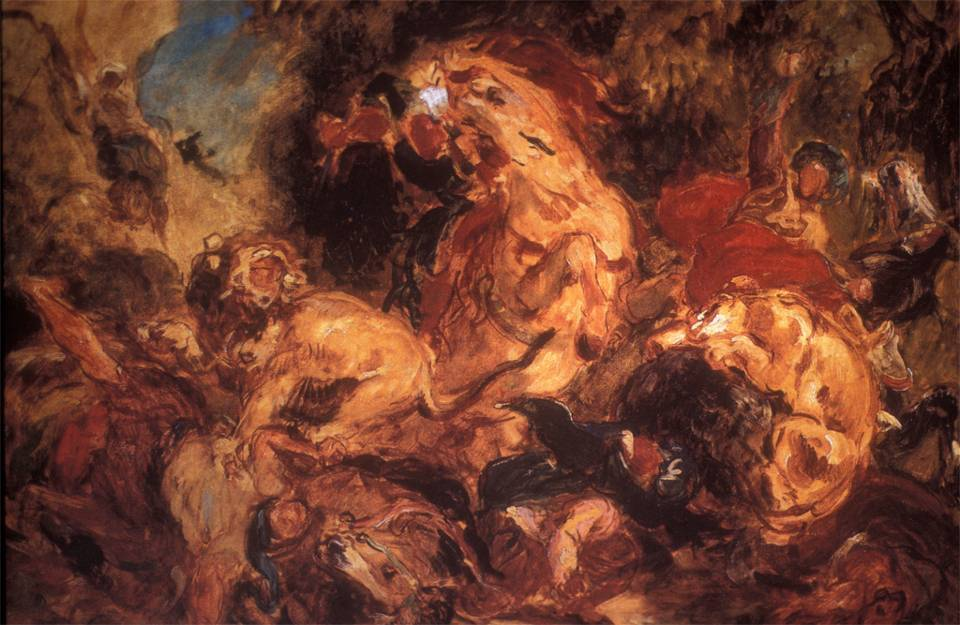
Sketch for a lion hunt, 1854
