= Urinal (health care) =

Bottle for urination used in health care

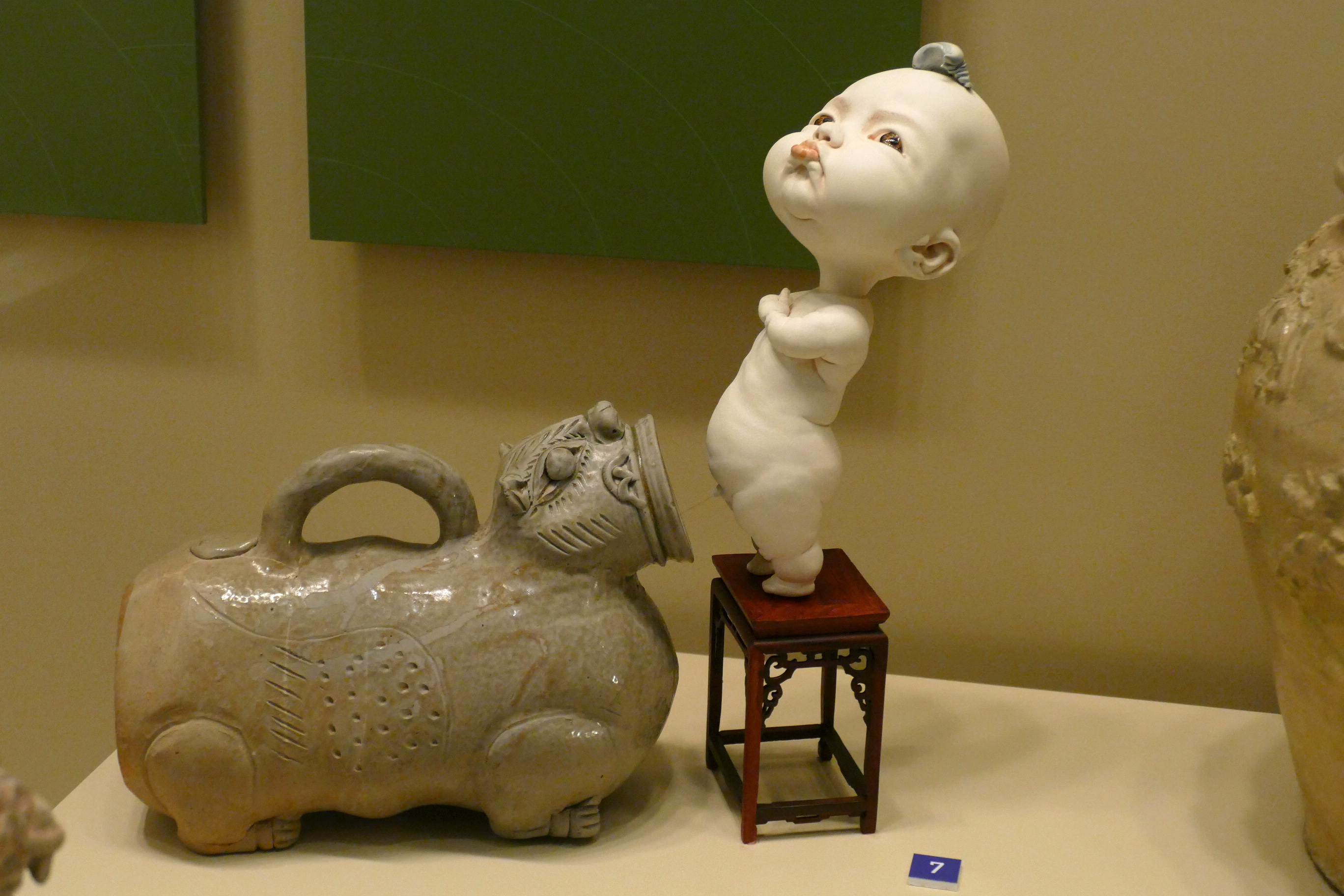
A celadonware urinal—known as huzi from the tendency to decorate them as crouching tigers—from China's Six Dynasties Period (Hong Kong Heritage Museum).

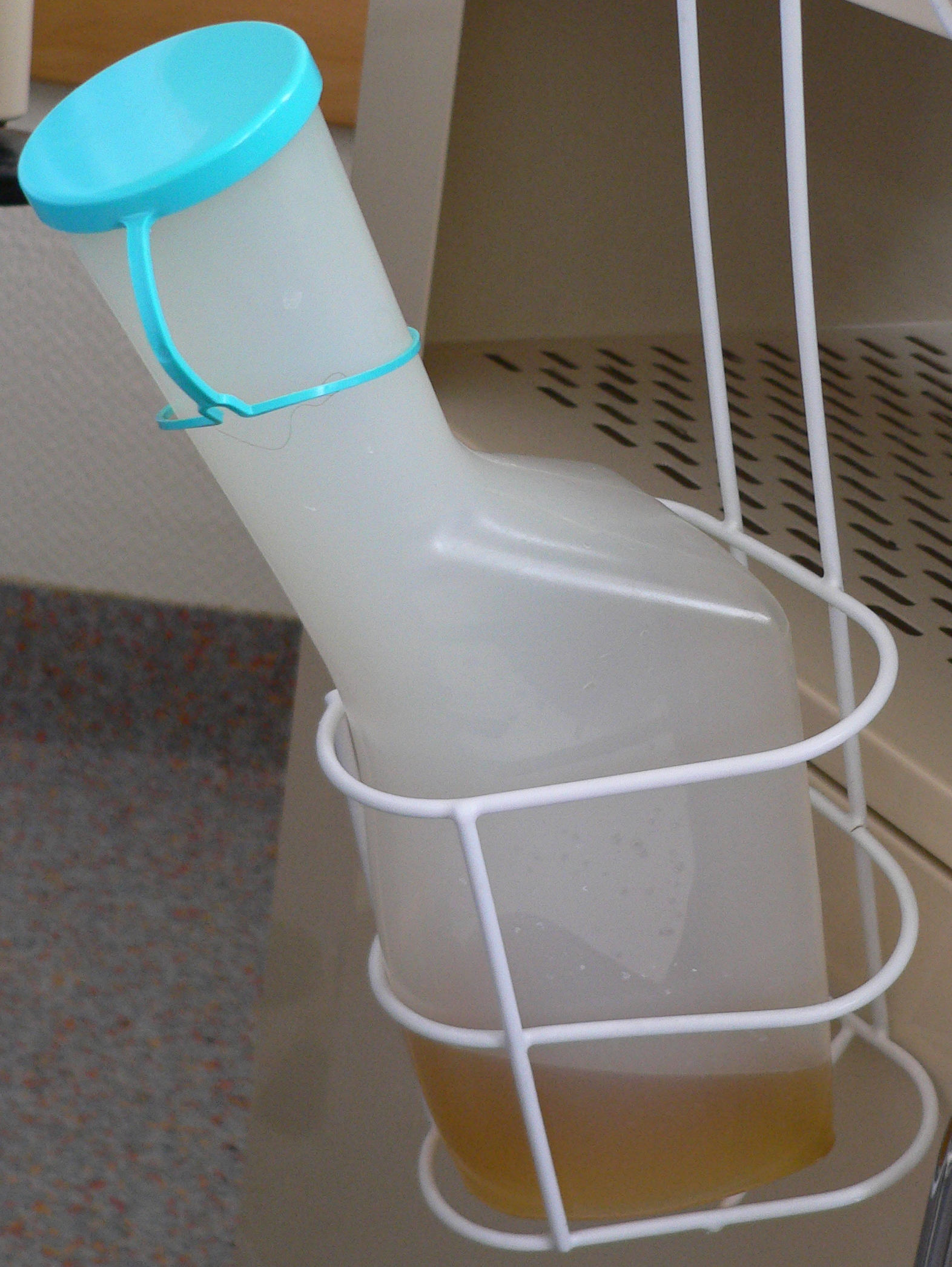
Modern urine bottle (informally known as "duck") in its wire rack

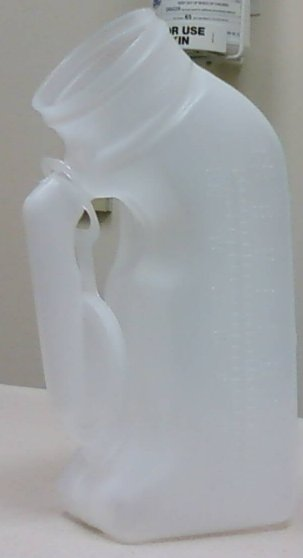
A male urinal bottle

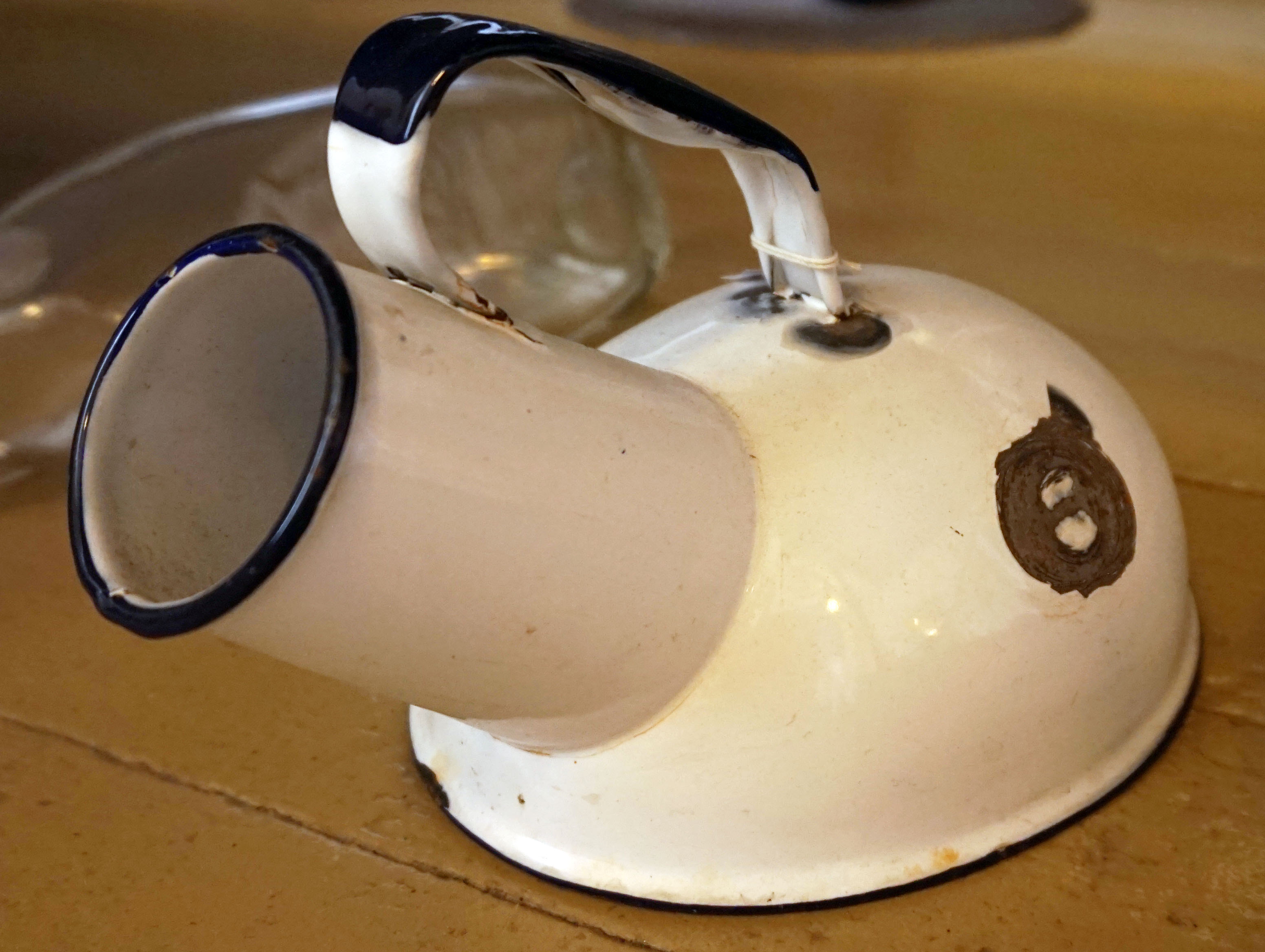
Vintage urine bottle

A urinal, urine bottle, or male urinal is a bottle for urination. It is most frequently used in health care for patients who find it impossible or difficult to get out of bed during sleep. Urinals allow the patient who has cognition and movement of their arms to urinate without the help of staff. A urinal bottle can also be used by travelers or transportation workers who are unable to immediately use a public restroom as part of an emergency kit, or in areas where restroom facilities are too distant.

Urinals are used as part of input and output measurement and feature embedded markings to measure the fluid.

Generally, patients who are able to are encouraged to walk to the toilet or use a bedside commode as opposed to a urinal. The prolonged use of a urinal has been shown to lead to constipation or difficulty urinating.

Urinals are most frequently used for male patients, since they are easier to use with a penis. While female urinals exist, they can be more difficult to use, and the more common practice for female patients is to use a bedpan. Female urinals require a wider opening and must be placed between the legs. For many women, female urinals are more practical in a wheelchair rather than in a bed. But the opening part of urinal may get infected by the germs and can be disinfected by various chemicals.
